= List of shipwrecks in January 1840 =

The list of shipwrecks in January 1840 includes ships sunk, foundered, wrecked, grounded, or otherwise lost during January 1840.

== 1 January ==
List of shipwrecks: 1 January 1840
Ship	State	Description
Active	United Kingdom	The ship struck The Mewstone and was damaged. She was on a voyage from Liverpool, Lancashire to Newcastle upon Tyne, Northumberland. Active was taken into Plymouth, Devon in a sinking condition.
Alcide	France	The ship was wrecked on Sandy Cay. Her crew were rescued. She was on a voyage from Havana, Cuba to Bordeaux, Gironde.
Atalanta	United Kingdom	The ship was abandoned off Campbeltown, Argyllshire. She was on a voyage from Ayr to Dundalk, County Louth.
Barusica or Borussia	Russia	The ship was driven ashore and wrecked on Unst, Shetland Islands or Uist, Outer Hebrides, United Kingdom with the loss of three of her crew. She was on a voyage from Arkhangelsk to Rotterdam, South Holland, Netherlands. Borussia was consequently condemned.
Catherine Louuisa	Norway	The ship sank off Bergen. She was on a voyage from Bergen to Memel, Prussia.
Elizabeth	Sweden	The ship was driven ashore and severely damaged near Molde, Norway with the loss of all but two of her crew. She was on a voyage from Hamburg to Gothenburg. Elizabeth was later refloated and taken into "Morsund".
Elliotts	United Kingdom	The ship was driven ashore at Hartlepool, County Durham. She was on a voyage from London to Hartlepool. She was later refloated.
Haidee	United Kingdom	The ship ran aground at Stromness, Orkney Islands. She was on a voyage from Leith, Lothian to Saint Vincent. Haidee was refloated on 4 January. She put into Liverpool on 22 January.
Marmeluke	United Kingdom	The brig was in collision with a brig off the Nore Lightship ( Trinity House) and was consequently beached near Shoeburyness, Essex. She was on a voyage from Gloucester to London. Marmeluke was later refloated.
Prince Regent	United Kingdom	The schooner ran aground and was damaged at Teignmouth, Devon. She was on a voyage from Newcastle upon Tyne to Teignmouth. Prince Regent was later refloated.

== 2 January ==
List of shipwrecks: 2 January 1840
Ship	State	Description
Leander	United Kingdom	The ship was driven ashore on Cape Sable Island, Nova Scotia, British North America. She was on a voyage from Antigua to Yarmouth, Nova Scotia.
Magnet	United Kingdom	The ship was wrecked on the Ower Sand. Her crew were rescued. she was on a voyage from Newport, Monmouthshire to Hull, Yorkshire.
Plough	United Kingdom	The ship struck the Carr Rock and sank. Her crew were rescued.
Spy	United States	The ship was wrecked on the Carysfort Reef. She was on a voyage from New York to New Orleans, Louisiana.
West Hendon	United Kingdom	The ship ran aground on the Haisborough Sands, in the North Sea off the coast of Norfolk and was abandoned by her crew. She was on a voyage from South Shields, County Durham to Malta.

== 3 January ==
List of shipwrecks: 3 January 1840
Ship	State	Description
Bragança	Portugal	The brig was wrecked at Porto. Her crew were rescued. She was on a voyage form Porto to Liverpool, Lancashire, United Kingdom.
Farmer	United Kingdom	The ship was wrecked at Cromarty. She was on a voyage from Liverpool to Portsoy, Aberdeenshire.

== 4 January ==
List of shipwrecks: 4 January 1840
Ship	State	Description
Frederik	Netherlands	The ship departed from Vlissingen, Zeeland for Genoa, Kingdom of Sardinia. No further trace, presumed foundered with the loss of all hands.
Minerva	Kingdom of Sardinia	The ship departed from Genoa for Amsterdam, North Holland, Netherlands. No further trace, presumed foundered with the loss of all hands.

== 5 January ==
List of shipwrecks: 5 January 1840
Ship	State	Description
Aurora	United Kingdom	The ship was driven ashore and damaged on Blockhouse Point, Hampshire. She was on a voyage from Portsmouth to Southampton. Aurora was refloated and put back to Portsmouth.
Brian Boro	United Kingdom	The ship ran aground off Holyhead, Anglesey. She was on a voyage from Liverpool, Lancashire to Dublin. Brian Boro was later refloated and resumed her voyage.
Caroline	United Kingdom	The ship ran aground on the Drumrod Bank, in the Irish Sea off the coast of County Waterford. She was on a voyage from Liverpool to Waterford. Caroline was later refloated.
Collyria	United States	The ship was in collision with the schooner Temperance ( (United Kingdom of Great Britain and Ireland) British North America) and sank at Salem, Massachusetts.
Hope	United Kingdom	The ship was abandoned off Slime Head, County Galway.

== 6 January ==
List of shipwrecks: 6 January 1840
Ship	State	Description
Ceres	Denmark	The ship sprang a leak and was beached at Grimsby, Lincolnshire, United Kingdom. She was on a voyage from Copenhagen to London, United Kingdom.
Eric	United Kingdom	The ship sprang a leak and foundered. she was on a voyage from Hull, Yorkshire to Gothenburg, Sweden.

== 7 January ==
List of shipwrecks: 7 January 1840
Ship	State	Description
Bowditch	United States	The ship collided with the tower at Havre de Grâce, Seine-Inférieure, France and was damaged. She was on a voyage from Havre de Grâce to New Orleans, Louisiana. Bowditch consequently put back to Havre de Grâce.
John Anderson	United Kingdom	The ship was driven ashore and damaged at Charleston, South Carolina, United States. She was on a voyage from Liverpool, Lancashire to Charleston. John Anderson was refloated on 19 January but consequently sank.
Providentia	Denmark	The ship was wrecked near "Starholm". She was on a voyage from Hull, Yorkshire, United Kingdom to Kolding.
Speedwell	United Kingdom	The ship was driven ashore by ice at Twielenfleth and was severely damaged. She was on a voyage from Hamburg to Hull.

== 8 January ==
List of shipwrecks: 8 January 1840
Ship	State	Description
Blixton	United States	The ship ran aground on the Lecateur Bank, in the Scheldt. She was on a voyage from New York to Antwerp, Belgium. Blixton was later refloated and taken into Antwerp.
Britannia	United Kingdom	The ship was driven ashore at Beadnell, Northumberland. She was on a voyage from Rotterdam, South Holland, Netherlands to Dundee, Forfarshire.
Hopewell	United Kingdom	The Humber Keel sank at King's Lynn, Norfolk.
Jessie	United Kingdom	The ship ran aground at Blyth, Northumberland. She was on a voyage from Anstruther, Fife to Newcastle upon Tyne, Northumberland. Jessie was later refloated and taken into Blyth.
Shannon	United Kingdom	The ship departed from Limerick for Glasgow, Renfrewshire. No further trace, presumed foundered with the loss of all hands.
William and Mary	United Kingdom	The ship collided with Rosebud (United Kingdom) and foundered in the North Sea off the coast of Suffolk. Her crew were rescued. She was on a voyage from Rochester, Kent to Sunderland, County Durham.

== 10 January ==
List of shipwrecks: 10 January 1840
Ship	State	Description
Blair	United Kingdom	The ship struck a sunken rock and was beached in Campbeltown Loch. She was on a voyage from Troon, Ayrshire to Dublin.
Elizabeth	United Kingdom	The ship was run into off The Skerries, Anglesey and was abandoned by her crew. She was on a voyage from Liverpool, Lancashire to Stettin.
Hannah	United Kingdom	The ship ran aground on the Blacktail Bank, in the North Sea off the coast of Essex.
Lady Emma	United Kingdom	The ship capsized in the Derwent River. She was on a voyage from South Australia to Launceston, Van Diemen's Land. Lady Emma was refloated on 12 January.
Tropique	France	The ship was abandoned off the Falkland Islands, having lost her rudder ten weeks previously. Five of her twelve crew had died. The survivors were rescued by Plumstead (United Kingdom). Tropique was on a voyage from Bordeaux, Gironde to Matanzas, Cuba.

== 11 January ==
List of shipwrecks: 11 January 1840
Ship	State	Description
Brailow	Hamburg	The ship was holed by ice and beached at Duhnen. She was on a voyage from Arkhangelsk, Russia to Hamburg. Brailow was later refloated and taken into Cuxhaven.
Despatch	United Kingdom	The ship ran aground on the Sprat Sand, in the English Channel off the coast of Devon. She was on a voyage from Teignmouth, Devon to London. Despatch was later refloated and resumed her voyage.
Euphemia	United Kingdom	The brig ran aground on the Gaa Bank, in the River Tay and was wrecked. Her crew were rescued. She was on a voyage from Newcastle upon Tyne, Northumberland to Dundee, Forfarshire.
Louise and Emilie	Hamburg	The ship was driven ashore at Cuxhaven.
Mary	United Kingdom	The ship ran aground at Seaton Sluice, County Durham. She was on a voyage from Faversham, Kent to Seaton Sluice.
Samuel Freeman	United Kingdom	The brig ran aground on the Blackwater Bank, in the Irish Sea. She floated off and foundered with the loss of either three of her nine crew. She was on a voyage from the Clyde to Charleston, South Carolina, United States.
Solanum	United Kingdom	The schooner ran aground at Killala, County Mayo. She was on a voyage from Killala to London. Solanum was refloated on 21 January.
Thyatirer	United Kingdom	The ship ran aground at South Shields, County Durham. She was on a voyage from Ipswich, Suffolk to South Shields.

== 12 January ==
List of shipwrecks: 12 January 1840
Ship	State	Description
Acorn	United Kingdom	The schooner drifted onto rocks when the wind dropped and became a wreck at Arbroath, Forfarshire. She was on a voyage from Newcastle upon Tyne to Arbroath with coal.
Blanche	United Kingdom	The ship was driven ashore at Ramsey, Isle of Man. She was on a voyage from Liverpool, Lancashire to Donegal. Blanche was refloated and taken into Ramsey.
Diligence	United Kingdom	The ship was driven ashore on Spike Island, County Cork. She was on a voyage from Llanelly, Glamorgan to Courtmacsherry, County Cork. Diligence was refloated on 18 January.
Eagle	United Kingdom	The schooner was wrecked in Dundrum Bay. Her crew were rescued. She was on a voyage from Liverpool to Newcastle upon Tyne.
Henry	United Kingdom	The sloop was driven ashore on Rathlin Island, County Down. Her crew were rescued. She was on a voyage from Londonderry to Glasgow, Renfrewshire.
Jack Tar	United Kingdom	The ship was driven ashore and wrecked in Algoa Bay. Her crew were rescued.
Jane	United Kingdom	The ship was driven ashore at Harrington, Cumberland.
Roe	United Kingdom	The ship was in collision with Agenoria and foundered in the North Sea off the coast of Yorkshire. Her crew were rescued by Agenoria.
Royal Adelaide	United Kingdom	The barque was driven ashore at Turnberry, Ayrshire. All on board were rescued. She was on a voyage from Greenock, Renfrewshire to Demerara, British Honduras.
Scylla	United Kingdom	The ship was driven ashore and severely damaged at Harrington. She was on a voyage from Dublin to Whitehaven, Cumberland. Scylla was refloated on 17 January.
William Huskisson	United Kingdom	The paddle steamer sprang a leak and foundered in the Irish Sea off Holyhead, Anglesey, or wreck reportedly found in 1920 on the Burbo Bank at the entrance to the River Mersey with the loss of at least 47 lives, or 95 of 120 were rescued. Ninety-four survivors were rescued by Huddersfield (United Kingdom). William Huskisson was on a voyage from Dublin to Liverpool, Lancashire.
Woodville	United Kingdom	The ship was driven ashore and severely damaged north of Harrington. She was refloated on 17 January.

== 13 January ==
List of shipwrecks: 13 January 1840
Ship	State	Description
Agnes	United Kingdom	The ship was driven ashore in Campbeltown Loch. She was on a voyage from Glasgow, Renfrewshire to Liverpool, Lancashire. Agnes was refloated and taken into Campbeltown, Argyllshire.
Clyde	United Kingdom	The ship was driven ashore at Saint John, New Brunswick, British North America. She was on a voyage from Saint John to London.
Lexington	United States	Lexington. During a voyage from New York City to Stonington, Connecticut, the 205-foot (62 m) 488-gross register ton sidewheel paddle steamer caught fire in Long Island Sound and sank in 70 to 150 feet (21 to 46 m) of water off Eatons Neck, Long Island, New York, with the loss of 139 of the 143 people on board.
Mars	United Kingdom	The ship was wrecked on The Prata Shoal. Her thirteen crew survived. Seven of them set out in the ship's longboat on 23 January and were rescued by Bombay Castle (United Kingdom) on 25 January. HMS Hyacinth (Royal Navy) subsequently rescued the other six. Mars was on a voyage from Manila, Spanish East Indies to China.
Mary	United Kingdom	The sloop was driven ashore at Margam, Glamorgan. She was refloated the next day and taken into Port Talbot, Glamorgan.
Ringdove	United Kingdom	The ship ran aground on the Gunfleet Sand, in the North Sea off the coast of Essex. She was on a voyage from Sunderland, County Durham to Algiers, Algeria. Ringdove was refloated on 15 January and taken into Harwich, Essex, where she was damaged by fire on 24 January.
St. Andrew	United Kingdom	The ship struck rocks off Port St Mary, Isle of Man and was holed. She was on a voyage from Liverpool, Lancashire to Carlingford, County Louth. St. Andrew put into Castletown, Isle of Man.

== 14 January ==
List of shipwrecks: 14 January 1840
Ship	State	Description
Johanna Wilhelmina	Hamburg	The ship was holed by ice and beached at Twielenfleth. She was on a voyage from Guernsey, Channel Islands to Hamburg. Johanna Wilhelmna was later refloated and taken into Altona.
Margaret Miller	(United Kingdom of Great Britain and Ireland) British North America	The barque was driven ashore and wrecked south of Lytham St. Annes, Lancashire, United Kingdom. All fifteen people on board were rescued. She was on a voyage from Halifax, Nova Scotia to Liverpool, Lancashire.
Nelly	United Kingdom	The ship was holed by ice and sank at Twielenfleth.
Prince de Bouillon	France	The ship struck the Oyster Bank, in the English Channel off Jersey, Channel Islands and sank. Her crew were rescued. She was on a voyage from Bristol, Gloucestershire, United Kingdom to Granville, Manche.
Providence	United Kingdom	The ship struck the pier and sank at Sunderland, County Durham. Her crew were rescued.
Providence	United Kingdom	The ship departed from Seville, Spain for Liverpool. No further trace, presumed foundered with the loss of all hands.

== 15 January ==
List of shipwrecks: 15 January 1840
Ship	State	Description
Active	United Kingdom	The sloop was driven ashore and wrecked at Whitburn, Northumberland. Her crew were rescued. She was on a voyage from Newcastle upon Tyne, Northumberland to Hartlepool, County Durham.
Jane	United Kingdom	The ship was driven ashore north of Maryport. She was refloated on 18 January.
Milo	United Kingdom	The ship was driven ashore in the Mississippi River downstream of New Orleans, Louisiana, United States.
Mona	United Kingdom	The ship was driven ashore north of Maryport, Cumberland. She was refloated on 16 January.
Salem	United Kingdom	The barque was driven ashore on "Irri-jowlan Island", in Clew Bay. Her crew were rescued. She was on a voyage from Saint John, New Brunswick to Liverpool. Salem was refloated on 23 January.
William	United Kingdom	The ship was driven ashore and wrecked at Lowestoft, Suffolk. She was on a voyage from Marans, Charente-Maritime, France to Lowestoft. William was refloated on 17 January and taken into Lowestoft in a severely leaky condition.

== 16 January ==
List of shipwrecks: 16 January 1840
Ship	State	Description
Ann and Dorothy	United Kingdom	The ship was wrecked near Boulogne, Pas-de-Calais, France. Her crew were rescued. She was on a voyage from Lymington, Hampshire to Sunderland, County Durham.

== 17 January ==
List of shipwrecks: 17 January 1840
Ship	State	Description
Hannah	India	The transport ship ran aground at the mouth of the Indus, where she was wrecked on 19 January with the loss of one life. Over 450 people were rescued. She was on a voyage from Kurachee to Bombay.
Jane	United Kingdom	The ship was driven ashore on Davaar Island, Argyllshire.
Pennsylvania	United States	The ship was driven ashore on "Salthorn". She was on a voyage from Baltimore, Maryland to Bremen.
Quebec Packet	United Kingdom	The ship was driven ashore at Kertch, Russia. She was later refloated.
Richard Bell	United Kingdom	The ship was driven ashore and wrecked in the Nicobar Islands. Her crew were rescued. She was on a voyage from North Shields, County Durham to Calcutta, India.
St. Lawrence	United Kingdom	The barque was driven ashore in the River Shannon. She was on a voyage from Nova Scotia, British North America to Caernarfon. St. Lawrence was refloated the next day and taken into Kilrush, County Clare.

== 18 January ==
List of shipwrecks: 18 January 1840
Ship	State	Description
Catherine	United Kingdom	The sloop was wrecked on the Heads of Ayr. Her crew were rescued. She was on a voyage from Lough Swilly to Glasgow, Renfrewshire.
Diana	United Kingdom	The ship was driven ashore and wrecked on Oronsay, Inner Hebrides. Her crew were rescued. She was on a voyage from Limerick to Glasgow.
Hope	United Kingdom	The ship was driven ashore at Curstown Point, County Louth. She was on a voyage from Lima, Peru to Glasgow. Hope was refloated on 24 January.
Isabella	United Kingdom	The ship departed from Newcastle upon Tyne, Northumberland. No further trace, presumed foundered with the loss of all hands.
Kilvington	United Kingdom	The schooner was wrecked on the Arklow Banks, in the Irish Sea off the coast of County Wicklow. Her crew were rescued. She was on a voyage from Liverpool, Lancashire to Waterford.
Lord Exmouth	United Kingdom	The ship ran aground at Southwold, Suffolk and was damaged. She was on a voyage from Southwold to Cardiff, Glamorgan. Lord Exmouth was refloated and put back to Southwold.
Rival	United Kingdom	The ship was driven ashore on Rathlin Island, County Antrim. Her crew were rescued. She was on a voyage from Saint John, New Brunswick, British North America to Liverpool. Rival broke up on 26 January.
Sagir-i-Kebir	Ottoman Navy	The paddle steamer ran aground in the Gulf of Mondaria.
Thomas	United Kingdom	The ship was driven ashore at Maryport, Cumberland. She was on a voyage from Bangor to Maryport.
Warrior	United Kingdom	The ship was driven ashore near Kinsale, County Cork. Her crew were rescued. She was on a voyage from Liverpool, Lancashire to Charleston, South Carolina, United States. Warrior was consequently condemned.

== 19 January ==
List of shipwrecks: 19 January 1840
Ship	State	Description
Active	United Kingdom	The ship was driven ashore at Troon, Ayrshire.
Agaphea	United Kingdom	The ship struck the pier and sank at Whitehaven, Cumberland.
Ariel	United Kingdom	The ship ran aground at Troon. She sank the next day. Ariel was on a voyage from Ardrossan, Ayrshire to Dublin.
Harriet	United Kingdom	The ship was driven ashore and wrecked at Maryport, Cumberland. She was on a voyage from Savannah, Georgia, United States to Liverpool, Lancashire.
Henry Volant	United Kingdom	The ship was driven ashore at Ballyshannon, County Donegal.
Kincardineshire	United Kingdom	The ship was driven ashore and wrecked near Dundrum, County Down. Her crew were rescued. She was on a voyage from Liverpool, Lancashire to Aberdeen.
Nancy	United Kingdom	The ship was driven ashore at Troon.
Newcastle	United Kingdom	The ship ran aground on the Scroby Sands, Norfolk and sank. Her crew were rescued. She was on a voyage from Newcastle upon Tyne, Northumberland to London.
Red Rover	United Kingdom	The schooner was driven ashore at Waterloo, Lancashire. She was on a voyage from Newfoundland to Liverpool. Red Rover was refloated on 20 February.
Renown	United Kingdom	The ship was driven ashore at Troon.
William	United Kingdom	The ship was abandoned in a sinking condition in the North Sea. Her crew were rescued by William and Mary (United Kingdom). William was on a voyage from London to Newcastle upon Tyne.
William and Betsey	United Kingdom	The schooner foundered off the Point of Ayre, Isle of Man.

== 20 January ==
List of shipwrecks: 20 January 1840
Ship	State	Description
Corrib	United Kingdom	The ship was driven onto a sandbank in the Middle Roads, off the coast of Glamorgan. She was on a voyage from Llanelly, Glamorgan to London. Corrib was later refloated.
Eliza	United Kingdom	The ship was driven ashore and wrecked at Boulmer, Northumberland. Her four crew were rescued. She was on a voyage from St. Andrews, Fife to Newcastle upon Tyne, Northumberland.
Eliza and Abbey	United Kingdom	The ship was driven ashore and wrecked at Ballyteague, County Kildare. Her crew were rescued. She was on a voyage from Wilmington, Delaware, United States to Liverpool, Lancashire.
Johnston	United Kingdom	The ship ran aground on the North Bank, in Liverpool Bay. She was refloated and put back to Liverpool.
Maid of Mostyn	United Kingdom	The ship foundered in the Irish Sea off the Howth Lighthouse with the loss of all on board. She was on a voyage from Dublin to Glasson Dock, Lancashire.
Margaret	United Kingdom	The barque was driven ashore at the mouth of the River Ribble. Her crew were rescued. She was on a voyage from Halifax, Nova Scotia, British North America to Liverpool, Lancashire.
Mary	United Kingdom	The ship was driven ashore and wrecked at Burry Port, Glamorgan with the loss of one of her three crew. She was on a voyage from Youghal, County Cork to Portsmouth, Hampshire.
Newcastle	United Kingdom	The ship ran aground on Scroby Sands, Norfolk and sank. Her crew were rescued by a yawl from Caister-on-Sea. She was on a voyage from Newcastle upon Tyne to London.
Orion	United Kingdom	The ship was wrecked on the coast of County Galway with the loss of all hands. She was on a voyage from Newfoundland, British North America to Liverpool.
Prince	United Kingdom	The ship struck the pier at Swansea, Glamorgan and was severely damaged. She was on a voyage from Newport, Monmouthshire to Southampton, Hampshire.
Sir Allan McNab	United Kingdom	The brig was driven ashore on the coast on New York, United States. She was on a voyage from Saint Kitts to Saint John, New Brunswick.
Traveller	United Kingdom	The ship foundered in the Bristol Channel off the English and Welsh Grounds Lightship ( Trinity House). Her crew were rescued. She was on a voyage from Cardiff, Glamorgan to Gloucester.
William	United Kingdom	The schooner foundered in the North Sea off Flamborough Head, Yorkshire. Her four crew were rescued by Rose (United Kingdom). William was on a voyage from Stockton-on-Tees, County Durham to Boston, Lincolnshire.

== 21 January ==
List of shipwrecks: 21 January 1840
Ship	State	Description
Alliance	United Kingdom	The ship was driven ashore at Bowmore, Islay. She was on a voyage from Liverpool, Lancashire to Sligo. Alliance was refloated on 23 January.
Clansman	United Kingdom	The ship was driven ashore at Gammel's Point in the Clyde. She was on a voyage from Demerara, British Honduras to the Clyde.
Cygnet	United Kingdom	The ship foundered in the North Sea off Lindisfarne, Northumberland.
Dauntless	United Kingdom	The ship was wrecked on the West Barrow Sand, in the North Sea off the coast of Essex. Her crew were rescued. She was on a voyage from London to São Miguel Island, Azores.
Despatch	United Kingdom	The ship was driven into Parrborough (United Kingdom) and was consequently beached at Belfast, County Antrim. She was on a voyage from Belfast to Ayr.
Dolphin	United Kingdom	The schooner was driven ashore and wrecked on Burry Holms, Glamorgan with the loss of all five crew.
Elizabeth	United Kingdom	The ship was driven ashore at Bowmore. She was on a voyage from Liverpool to Killybegs, County Donegal.
Emmeline	(United Kingdom of Great Britain and Ireland) British North America	The schooner was wrecked at Glengarrif, County Cork. Her crew were rescued. She was on a voyage from Saint John, New Brunswick to Dublin.
Frederick	Norway	The ship was driven ashore and wrecked on Listerlandet, Sweden with the loss of a crew member. She was on a voyage from Lisbon, Portugal to Stavanger.
Harriet	United Kingdom	The ship was driven ashore and wrecked at Maryport, Cumberland. She was on a voyage from Savannah, Georgia, United States to Liverpool.
Helen	United Kingdom	The smack was driven ashore and wrecked at Seaford, Sussex. Her five crew were rescued. She was on a voyage from São Miguel Island, Azores to London.
Henry and Elizabeth	United Kingdom	The ship struck the pier and sank at Ramsgate, Kent. She was on a voyage from Blakeney, Norfolk to Liverpool. Henry and Elizabeth was refloated on 21 January and taken into Ramsgate.
Inventus	United Kingdom	The ship was driven ashore at Bowmore. She was on a voyage from Sligo to Liverpool.
Laura	United Kingdom	The ship was sunk by ice at Memel, Prussia. Her crew were rescued.
Mayflower	United Kingdom	The schooner ran aground on the Platters, in Holyhead Bay. She was on a voyage from Dublin to Newcastle upon Tyne, Northumberland. Mayflower was refloated and taken into Holyhead, Anglesey.
Perseverance	United Kingdom	The ship was driven ashore at Bowmore. She was on a voyage from Liverpool to Westport, County Mayo. Perseverance was refloated on 8 February.
Shepherd	United Kingdom	The schooner was driven ashore and wrecked at Worms Head, Glamorgan with the loss of all hands. She was on a voyage from Swansea, Glamorgan to Dublin.
Silvain	United Kingdom	The ship was driven ashore near Audreselles, Pas-de-Calais, France. She was on a voyage from Southampton, Hampshire to Sunderland, County Durham.
Suir	United Kingdom	The barque was driven ashore and wrecked at Llanmadoc, Glamorgan. Her crew were rescued. She was on a voyage from Waterford to Llanelly, Glamorgan Suir was refloated on 3 April and taken into Llanelly.
Tulloch Castle	United Kingdom	The ship was driven ashore at Penzance, Cornwall. She was on a voyage from Saint John, New Brunswick to Penzance. Tulloch Castle was refloated and taken into Penzance.
Undaunted	United Kingdom	The ship was wrecked off Port Morant, Jamaica. Her crew were rescued. She was on a voyage from London to Port Morant.
Urania	(United Kingdom of Great Britain and Ireland) Guernsey	The ship capsized off Great Yarmouth, Norfolk with the loss of two of her crew. She was on a voyage from Newcastle upon Tyne, Northumberland to Guernsey, Channel Islands.

== 22 January ==
List of shipwrecks: 22 January 1840
Ship	State	Description
Alarm	United Kingdom	The ship foundered in the Irish Sea. Her crew were rescued. She was on a voyage from Lancaster to Liverpool, Lancashire.
Ann	United Kingdom	The brig was driven ashore and wrecked at Newgale, Pembrokeshire. Her crew survived. She was on a voyage from Gloucester to Livorno, Grand Duchy of Tuscany.
Avenger	United Kingdom	The ship was driven ashore in Fabian's Bay. She was on a voyage from Newport, Monmouthshire to Newhaven, Sussex.
Bramley	United Kingdom	The ship was driven ashore at Zandvoort, North Holland, Netherlands. She was on a voyage from London to Amsterdam, North Holland. Bramley was later refloated and resumed her voyage, arriving at Amsterdam on 6 March.
Concord	United States	The ship was driven ashore in the Clyde.
Cronstadt	Russia	The ship was driven ashore at Rammekins Castle, Zeeland, Netherlands. She was on a voyage from Antwerp, Belgium to Matanzas, Cuba. Cronstadt was refloated the next day.
Despatch	United Kingdom	The schooner was driven into the brig Parsboro' (United Kingdom) in Strangford Lough and was consequently beached on the Hollywood Bank. She was on a voyage from Belfast, County Antrim to Ayr.
Dolphin	United Kingdom	The schooner was wrecked on Burry Holms, Glamorgan.
George IV	United Kingdom	The ship was driven aground off Hakin Point, Pembrokeshire. She was on a voyage from Llanelly, Glamorgan to Waterford.
John	United Kingdom	The ship was driven ashore in Southampton Water. She was on a voyage from Dublin to Southampton, Hampshire.
Margaretha Johanna	Netherlands	The ship was driven ashore and wrecked at Kijkduin, South Holland with the loss of two of her crew. She was on a voyage from Java, Netherlands East Indies to Amsterdam, North Holland.
Mary Ann	United Kingdom	The ship was driven ashore in Bootle Bay. She was on a voyage from Dundalk, County Louth to Liverpool. Mary Ann was refloated the next day and taken into Liverpool.
Salisbury	United Kingdom	The ship was abandoned 60 nautical miles (110 km) south east of Flamborough Head, Yorkshire. Her crew were rescued.
Shepherd	United Kingdom	The ship was wrecked near Worms Head, Glamorgan.
Solon	United Kingdom	The snow struck a rock off the Saltee Islands, County Wexford and was abandoned by her crew. She was subsequently driven ashore and on Rathlin Island, County Antrim. Solon was on a voyage from Saint John, New Brunswick, British North America to Whitehaven, Cumberland. She later floated off, see the entry for 26 January for her subsequent fate.

== 23 January ==
List of shipwrecks: 23 January 1840
Ship	State	Description
Bellona	United Kingdom	The ship was wrecked on Grand Manan, New Brunswick, British North America. Her crew were rescued. She was on a voyage from Saint John, New Brunswick to Newry, County Antrim.
Brian Boru	United Kingdom	The ship departed from Glasgow, Renfrewshire for Limerick. No further trace, presumed foundered with the loss of all hands.
Courier de Bresil	France	The ship was wrecked on Pointe St. Quentin with the loss of all but one of her crew. She was on a voyage from Marseille, Bouches-du-Rhône to Saint-Valery-sur-Somme.
Indiana	United Kingdom	The ship was wrecked at Freshwater West, Pembrokeshire. Her crew were rescued. She was on a voyage from Calcutta, India to Liverpool, Lancashire.
Lord Althorp	United Kingdom	The ship sprang a leak and was abandoned in the North Sea. Her crew were rescued by Zeevaard (Netherlands). Lord Althorp was on a voyage from Sunderland, County Durham to Rotterdam, South Holland, Netherlands.
Stour	United Kingdom	The ship ran aground on the Pakefield Flats, in the North Sea off the coast of Suffolk and was damaged. She was refloated.

== 24 January ==
List of shipwrecks: 24 January 1840
Ship	State	Description
Albion	United Kingdom	The full-rigged ship was driven ashore at Great Yarmouth, Norfolk. She was on a voyage from Quebec City, Lower Canada, British North America to Great Yarmouth. Albion was refloated on 25 January and taken into Great Yarmouth.
Barlow	United Kingdom	The ship ran aground on the Mouse Sand, in the North Sea off the coast of Essex. She was refloated on 27 January.
British Queen	United Kingdom	The ship was driven ashore and wrecked on Jura, Inner Hebrides. She was on a voyage from Bangor to Hull, Yorkshire. British Queen was refloated on 4 February.
Charles	(United Kingdom of Great Britain and Ireland) British North America	The brigantine was wrecked at Cape St. Mary's, Nova Scotia, British North America with the loss of all hands. She was on a voyage from Saint John, New Brunswick to Liverpool, Lancashire.
Columbine	United Kingdom	The ship was wrecked on Flotta, Orkney Islands.
Comet	United Kingdom	The ship ran aground on the Cleaves, in the River Avon, and sank. She was on a voyage from Bristol, Gloucestershire to Bridgwater, Somerset. Comet was refloated on 2 February and taken into Bristol.
Deux Cousins	France	The ship foundered off Jersey. Her crew were rescued. She was on a voyage from Bréhal, Manche to Boulogne, Pas-de-Calais.
Etoile	France	The ship was driven ashore at "Muddicombe", Devon. Her crew were rescued. She was on a voyage from "Aloneria" to Rouen, Seine-Inférieure. Etoile was subsequently wrecked.
Felix	France	The ship was wrecked in a hurricane at Martinique. Nine of her crew were rescued.
Four Brothers	United Kingdom	The ship was driven ashore at Plymouth, Devon. She was on a voyage from Plymouth to Exeter. Four Brothers became a wreck on 4 February.
Hope	United Kingdom	The ship was driven ashore at Teignmouth, Devon. She was on a voyage from Miramichi, New Brunswick, British North America to Salcombe, Devon. She had become a wreck by 4 February.
New Hopewell	United Kingdom	The ship foundered in the North Sea off Saltburn-by-the-Sea, Yorkshire. Her six crew were rescued by a coble from Staithes. She was on a voyage from Wells-next-the-Sea, Norfolk to Newcastle upon Tyne, Northumberland.
Quebec Packet	United Kingdom	The ship ran aground in the Garavogue River. She was later refloated.
Romulus	United Kingdom	The ship ran aground in the Garavogue River. She was later refloated.
Saggitario	Austrian Empire	The polacca was wrecked near Chesil Beach. Dorset, United Kingdom. Her thirteen crew were rescued. She was on a voyage from Antwerp, Belgium to Constantinople, Ottoman Empire.
Sophie	France	The ship sank at Ramsgate, Kent, United Kingdom. Her crew were rescued. She was on a voyage from Martinique to Havre de Grâce, Seine-Inférieure.
Theodore	Bremen	The schooner was wrecked near Jacmel, Haiti. Her crew were rescued.
Thomas Dryden	United Kingdom	The brig ran aground in the Garavogue River. She was refloated on 5 February.
Trois Amis	France	The schooner capsized off Beachy Head, Sussex, United Kingdom. She came ashore at St. Leonards-on-Sea, Sussex the next day.

== 25 January ==
List of shipwrecks: 25 January 1840
Ship	State	Description
Adventure	United Kingdom	The ship was driven ashore near Stallingborough, Lincolnshire. She was on a voyage from Hull, Yorkshire to Newcastle upon Tyne, Northumberland.
Catherine	United Kingdom	The sloop was wrecked at the Heads of Ayr. Her crew survived. She was on a voyage from Lough Swilly to Glasgow, Renfrewshire.
Charlotte	United Kingdom	The ship was driven into Carl Gustav de Rosenorn (Denmark), struck a rock and sank at Bergen, Norway. She was on a voyage from Sunderland, County Durham to Gothenburg, Sweden.
Commodore	United Kingdom	The barque ran aground on the Maplin Sand, in the North Sea off the coast of Essex and was wrecked. She was on a voyage from Mauritius to a British port.
Duke of Sussex	United Kingdom	The barque was driven ashore and wrecked in the Sound of Hoy with the loss of nine of the sixteen people on board. She was on a voyage from Sunderland, County Durham to the Cape Colony. Duke of Sussex was on her maiden voyage, from Newcastle upon Tyne, Northumberland to the Cape of Good Hope.
Euphemia	United Kingdom	The ship foundered in the North Sea off Flamborough Head, Yorkshire. Her crew were rescued.
Gladiator	United States	The ship was driven ashore by ice at New York and was damaged. She was on a voyage from New York to London. Gladiator was refloated on 28 January and resumed her voyage.
Hebbles Lightship	Trinity House	The lightship was driven ashore at Marfleet, Lincolnshire.
Jacques	France	The ship was wrecked on the Île de Batz, Finistère. She was on a voyage from Fiume, Austrian Empire to Dunkirk, Nord.
Joanna Maria	Denmark	The ship ran aground on the Brambles, in the Solent. She was on a voyage from Copenhagen to Saint Croix, Virgin Islands. She was later refloated.
Josephine	Sweden	The ship was driven ashore and wrecked in "Oldersound", Norway. She was on a voyage from Hull to Gothenburg.
Liffey	United Kingdom	The ship ran aground on a reef off Long Island, Antigua. She was refloated but consequently sank. She was on a voyage from Liverpool, Lancashire to the Spanish Main.
Moslem	United Kingdom	The ship was driven ashore in Stangate Creek.
Swift	United Kingdom	The brigantine sank at Swansea, Glamorgan. She was on a voyage from Newport, Monmouthshire to Hull.
Trevor	United Kingdom	The ship was driven ashore and sank in Dundrum Bay. Her crew were rescued. She was on a voyage from Marseille, Bouches-du-Rhône, France to Belfast, County Antrim.

== 26 January ==
List of shipwrecks: 26 January 1840
Ship	State	Description
Cygnet	United Kingdom	The ship foundered in the North Sea off Lindisfarne, Northumberland. Her crew were rescued by Ann (United Kingdom).
Elizabeth Moore	United Kingdom	The barque ran aground on the Maplin Sand, in the North Sea off the coast of Essex. She was on a voyage from Sydney, New South Wales to London. Elizabeth Moor was refloated and beached in The Swale near Swalecliffe, Kent.
Fearon	United Kingdom	The ship sprang a leak and foundered in the North Sea 160 nautical miles (300 km) off Tynemouth Castle, Northumberland. Her crew were rescued by Emblem (United Kingdom). Fearon was on a voyage from Shoreham-by-Sea, Sussex to Sunderland, County Durham.
Friend's Adventure	United Kingdom	The brig was wrecked on the Gunfleet Sand, in the North Sea off the coast of Essex. Her crew were rescued. She was on a voyage from Stockton-on-Tees, County Durham to London.
Indiana	United Kingdom	The ship was wrecked at Milford Haven, Pembrokeshire. She was on a voyage from Calcutta, India to Liverpool, Lancashire.
Jean Marie	France	The ship was driven ashore in the Sèvre Niortaise.
Newcastle	United Kingdom	The ship was driven ashore and wrecked on Fanø, Denmark.
Recovery	United Kingdom	The brig was driven ashore near Brest, Finistère, France, where she was subsequently wrecked. Her crew were rescued. She was on a voyage from Odesa to London.
Samuel Brown	United Kingdom	The ship was wrecked on the Goodwin Sands, Kent with the loss of all hands. She was on a voyage from Mauritius to London.
Solon	United Kingdom	The crewless ship was driven ashore and wrecked near Holyhead, Anglesey.
Trevor	United Kingdom	The ship was driven ashore and sank in Dundrum Bay. Her crew were rescued. She was on a voyage from Marseille, Bouches-du-Rhône, France to Belfast, County Antrim.
Vivacious	United Kingdom	The ship was driven ashore in the River Thames downstream of Gravesend, Kent. She was on a voyage from São Miguel Island, Azores to London.

== 27 January ==
List of shipwrecks: 27 January 1840
Ship	State	Description
Bradley	United Kingdom	The ship was driven ashore at Blyth, Northumberland. She was later refloated.
Brothers	United Kingdom	The ship struck a rock and sank at Chepstow, Monmouthshire. She was on a voyage from Chepstow to Gloucester. Brothers was refloated on 17 February and taken into Chepstow.
Corsair	United Kingdom	The ship was wrecked on Jordan's Bank, in Liverpool Bay. All twenty people on board were rescued by the lifeboat Magazine (United Kingdom) and a steam tug. Corsair was on a voyage from Halifax, Nova Scotia, British North America to Liverpool, Lancashire.
Duc de Trevise	France	The ship was driven ashore at Dunkirk, Nord. She was on a voyage from Cette, Hérault to Dunkirk.
Eliza	United Kingdom	The sloop was driven ashore on Wangerooge, Grand Duchy of Oldenburg. Her crew were rescued. She was on a voyage from London to Plymouth, Devon.
George	United Kingdom	The ship sank in the River Nene near Wisbech, Cambridgeshire. She was later refloated and taken into Boston, Lincolnshire, where she arrived on 4 February.
Mary	United Kingdom	The ship was driven ashore at Maryport, Cumberland. She was on a voyage from Belfast, County Antrim to Maryport. Mary was later refloated and taken into Maryport.
Regent, and Quebec	United Kingdom	The schooner Regent collided with the brig Quebec off Pakefield, Suffolk. Both vessels foundered, their crews were rescued by Bon Accord (United Kingdom). Regent was on a voyage from Aberdeen to London. Quebec was on a voyage from Quebec City, Lower Canada, British North America to London.
Rose	United Kingdom	The ship was driven ashore 2 nautical miles (3.7 km) from King's Lynn, Norfolk.

== 28 January ==
List of shipwrecks: 28 January 1840
Ship	State	Description
Alert	United Kingdom	The ship departed from São Miguel Island, Azores for London. No further trace, presumed foundered with the loss of all hands.
Eliza and Jessie	United Kingdom	The ship was driven ashore and wrecked on Wangerooge, Grand Duchy of Oldenburg. Her crew were rescued. She was on a voyage from London to Plymouth, Devon.
Elizabeth Moore	United Kingdom	The ship was driven ashore at Swalecliffe, Kent.
Frau Johanne	Lübeck	The ship was wrecked near Marstrand, Sweden with the loss of all but two of her crew. She was on a voyage from Newcastle upon Tyne, Northumberland, United Kingdom to Lübeck.
Harriet	United States	The full-rigged ship was driven ashore and wrecked at Whitehaven, Cumberland, United Kingdom. Her crew were rescued. She was on a voyage from Savannah, Georgia to Liverpool, Lancashire, United Kingdom.
Hellespont	United Kingdom	The ship ran aground on the Newcombe Sand, in the North Sea off the coast of Norfolk. She was later refloated and taken into Lowestoft, Suffolk.
St. Ann	United Kingdom	The ship ran aground on the Hook Sand, in the Bristol Channel, and sank. She was on a voyage from Jersey, Channel Islands to Swansea, Glamorgan.

== 29 January ==
List of shipwrecks: 29 January 1840
Ship	State	Description
Mary	United Kingdom	The ship sprang a leak and was beached at Praia, Cape Verde Islands. She was on a voyage from Sierra Leone to Jamaica.
Neske Maria	Grand Duchy of Oldenburg	The ship was driven ashore and wrecked on Heligoland. She was on a voyage from Carolinensiel to Hull, Yorkshire, United Kingdom.

== 30 January ==
List of shipwrecks: 30 January 1840
Ship	State	Description
Aldborough	(United Kingdom of Great Britain and Ireland) Jersey	The cutter driven ashore and wrecked near the Salerie Battery, Saint Peter Port, Guernsey, Channel Islands. Her crew were rescued. She was on a voyage from Jersey, Channel Islands to London.
Angerona	United Kingdom	The ship ran aground at Oban, Argyllshire. She was on a voyage from Newcastle upon Tyne to Lisbon, Portugal. Angerona was refloated on 28 February and resumed her voyage.
Anna Agatha	Netherlands	The ship was driven ashore at Beaumaris, Anglesey, United Kingdom. She was on a voyage from Liverpool, Lancashire, United Kingdom to Rotterdam, South Holland. Anna Agatha was refloated the next day and resumed her voyage.
Betty and Jenny	United Kingdom	The smack was driven ashore and wrecked at Port-le-Murray, Isle of Man.
Cadiz	United Kingdom	The ship was driven ashore and severely damaged at Port-le-Murray. She was on a voyage from Dingle, County Kerry to Liverpool, Lancashire.
Caledonia	United Kingdom	The ship ran aground at Saint Sampson, Guernsey and was damaged. She was on a voyage from Rio de Janeiro, Brazil to Saint Sampson. She was further damaged the next day when Beverley (United Kingdom) ran into her.
Carryon	United Kingdom	The smack was driven ashore and wrecked north of Ramsey, Isle of Man with the loss of two of her crew.
Cestrian	United Kingdom	The ship was driven ashore at Beaumaris. She was refloated the next day.
Clyde, and Star	United Kingdom	The sloop Clyde was run into by Star in the River Thames and was holed by Star's anchor. Both vessels were beached.
Eagle	United Kingdom	The schooner ran aground on the Shoeburyness Knock Sand. She was on a voyage from Leith, Lothian to London. Eagle was refloated on 1 February and resumed her voyage.
Eight Gebroders	Netherlands	The ship ran aground at Amsterdam, North Holland. SHe was on a voyage from Amsterdam to Marseille, Bouches-du-Rhône, France.
Gipsy	United Kingdom	The ship was driven ashore and damaged at Beaumaris. She was on a voyage from Liverpool to Bordeaux, Gironde, France. Gipsy was refloated the next day.
Heemskirk	Netherlands	The ship was driven ashore on Eierland, North Holland. She was on a voyage from Amsterdam to Batavia, Netherlands East Indies.
Irishman	United Kingdom	The ship ran aground on the Gabawn Shoal. She was refloated.
Julius	Hamburg	The ship was driven ashore at Beaumaris. She was on a voyage from Bangor, Caernarfonshire to Altona. Julius was refloated the next day.
Mary	United Kingdom	The ship was driven ashore at Beaumaris. She was refloated the next day.
Robert Garden	United Kingdom	The ship was driven ashore at Dover, Kent. She was refloated on 2 February.
Sarah	United Kingdom	The ship was severely damaged at Guernsey.
Tarujo Secondo	Portugal	The ship was driven ashore at Beaumaris. She was on a voyage from Liverpool to Lisbon. Tarujo Secondo was refloated the next day.

== 31 January ==
List of shipwrecks: 31 January 1840
Ship	State	Description
Helen	United Kingdom	The ship was driven ashore at Pakefield, Suffolk. She was on a voyage from Hull, Yorkshire to London. Helen was refloated and taken into Lowestoft, Suffolk.
Jane Kelly	United Kingdom	The ship was driven ashore at Apple River, Nova Scotia, British North America. She was on a voyage from Yarmouth, Nova Scotia to Saint John, New Brunswick, British North America.
John Stuart	United Kingdom	The ship was driven ashore and wrecked at Viana do Castelo, Portugal.
Pomona	United Kingdom	The ship was driven ashore at Glückstadt. She was on a voyage from Hamburg to Liverpool, Lancashire. Pomona was refloated on 11 February and taken into Glückstadt.
Sarah	United Kingdom	The ship was driven ashore and wrecked near Peterhead, Aberdeenshire.
Trusty	United Kingdom	The ship departed from "Requejada" for Plymouth, Devon. No further trace, presumed foundered with the loss of all hands.

== Unknown date ==
List of shipwrecks: Unknown date in January 1840
Ship	State	Description
Amelie Celeste	France	The ship was abandoned in the Atlantic Ocean before 1 February.
Ann Crichton	United Kingdom	The ship was wrecked in the Cayman Islands before 20 January. She was on a voyage from Liverpool, Lancashire, to New Orleans, Louisiana, United States.
Apollo	United Kingdom	The ship was driven ashore and wrecked near Hamburg. She was on a voyage from Newcastle upon Tyne, Northumberland, to Leith, Lothian.
Bangor	United States	The ship ran aground at New York. Whilst aground, she was run into by Norway (United States) and severely damaged in the stern.
Barbara	(United Kingdom of Great Britain and Ireland) British North America	The ship was wrecked on Table Island. Her crew were rescued. She was on a voyage from Saint John's, Newfoundland, to Halifax, Nova Scotia.
Beiram	United Kingdom	The ship struck a rock off Çeşme, Ottoman Empire before 22 January and was damaged. She consequently put into Syra, Kingdom of Greece for repairs. Beiram was on a voyage from Çeşme to London.
Catherina Helena	Norway	The ship foundered off Bergen. She was on a voyage from Bergen to Memel, Prussia.
Concord	United Kingdom	The ship was driven ashore at Portsmouth, Hampshire. She was on a voyage from Portsmouth to Sunderland, County Durham. Portsmouth was refloated on 13 January.
Christina Margaretta	Duchy of Holstein	The ship sailed from an English port for a port in the Duchy of Holstein. No further trace, presumed foundered in the North Sea with the loss of all hands.
Delighter	United Kingdom	The ship was driven ashore on Spike Island, County Cork. She was on a voyage from Llanelly, Glamorgan, to Courtmacsherry, County Cork. Delighter was scuttled on 12 January.
Dunn	United Kingdom	The brig foundered in the Dogger Bank before 1 February. Her crew were rescued by Mary Ann (United Kingdom).
Eleanor	United Kingdom	The ship was driven ashore at Harrington, Cumberland. She was refloated on 17 January.
Formidable	France	The ship was lost at "Johanna", Madagascar. Her crew were rescued.
Frist	United Kingdom	The ship was driven ashore near "Port Jolly", Nova Scotia. She was on a voyage from Prince Edward Island, British North America to Cork. Frist was later refloated and taken into Liverpool, Nova Scotia for repairs.
Helen	United Kingdom	The ship was driven ashore and wrecked at Lowestoft, Suffolk, before 31 January.
Louise Auguste	Duchy of Holstein	The ship departed from an English port for a port in the Duchy of Holstein. No further trace, presumed foundered in the North Sea with the loss of all hands.
Lyndsays	(United Kingdom of Great Britain and Ireland) New South Wales	The ship was beached at Sydney. She was on a voyage from Twofold Bay to Sydney.
Miller	United Kingdom	The ship was driven ashore in Loch Indaal before 8 January. She was on a voyage from Glasgow, Renfrewshire, to Londonderry. Miller was later refloated.
Petrel	United Kingdom	The ship struck the Newton Rock and was damaged. She was on a voyage from Limerick to Greenock, Renfrewshire. Petrel was later refloated and put back to Limerick.
Prospect	United Kingdom	The brig foundered in the Dogger Bank before 1 February. Her crew were rescued by Mary Ann (United Kingdom). She was on a voyage from Sunderland, County Durham to Bordeaux, Gironde, France.
Roscius	United Kingdom	The ship foundered in the Irish Sea before 17 January.
Sarah	United Kingdom	The ship was driven ashore at Peterhead, Aberdeenshire, before 1 February.
Swift	United Kingdom	The ship foundered in the Irish Sea off County Waterford before 17 January.
Thomas	United Kingdom	The ship was driven ashore at Maryport, Cumberland. She was refloated on 18 January.
Veronica	Netherlands	The ship was driven ashore at Plymouth, Devon, United Kingdom. She was on a voyage form Amsterdam, North Holland to Batavia, Netherlands East Indies.
