= Firth of Clyde =

Inlet on the west coast of Scotland

Coordinates: 55°40′N 5°00′W

- Clyde Waters, Clyde Sea
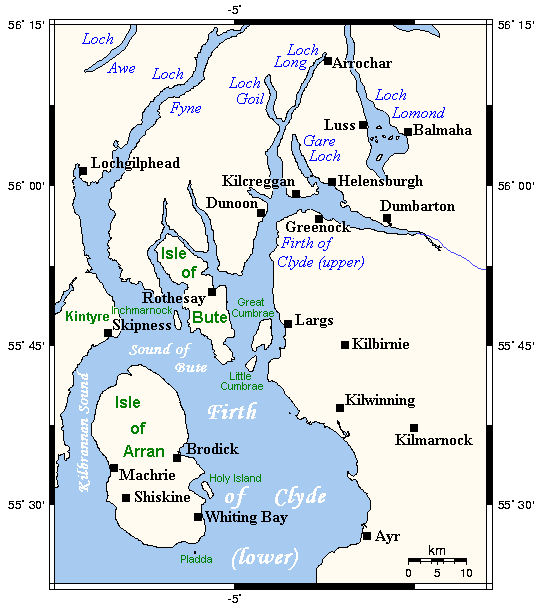
- Map of the Firth of Clyde.

- Location within Argyll and Bute Location within Scotland
- Location: Scotland
- Coordinates: grid reference NS153652
- Type: Firth
- Etymology: Scottish
- Part of: Irish Sea
- River sources: River Clyde
- Basin countries: Scotland
- Surface area: 4,279 km^{2} (1,652 sq mi)
- Average depth: 58 m (190 ft)
- Max. depth: 198 m (650 ft)
- Shore length^{1}: 1,256 km (780 mi)
- Surface elevation: 0 m (0 ft)
- Frozen: No
- Islands: Isle of Arran, Isle of Bute, Isle of Cumbrae

Ramsar Wetland
- Designated: 5 September 2000
- Reference no.: 1036
- ^{1} Shore length is not a well-defined measure.

The Firth of Clyde is the estuary of the River Clyde, on the west coast of Scotland. The Firth has some of the deepest coastal waters of the British Isles and is sheltered from the Atlantic Ocean by the Kintyre Peninsula. The Firth lies between West Dunbartonshire in the north, Argyll and Bute in the west, and Inverclyde, North Ayrshire and South Ayrshire in the east. Kilbrannan Sound is a large arm of the Firth, separating the Kintyre Peninsula from the Isle of Arran. The Kyles of Bute separates the Isle of Bute from the Cowal Peninsula. The Sound of Bute separates the islands of Bute and Arran.

The Highland Boundary Fault crosses the Firth. The Firth also played a vital military role during World War II.

The Firth is sometimes called the Clyde Waters or Clyde Sea. It is customarily considered to be part of the Irish Sea.

== Geography ==
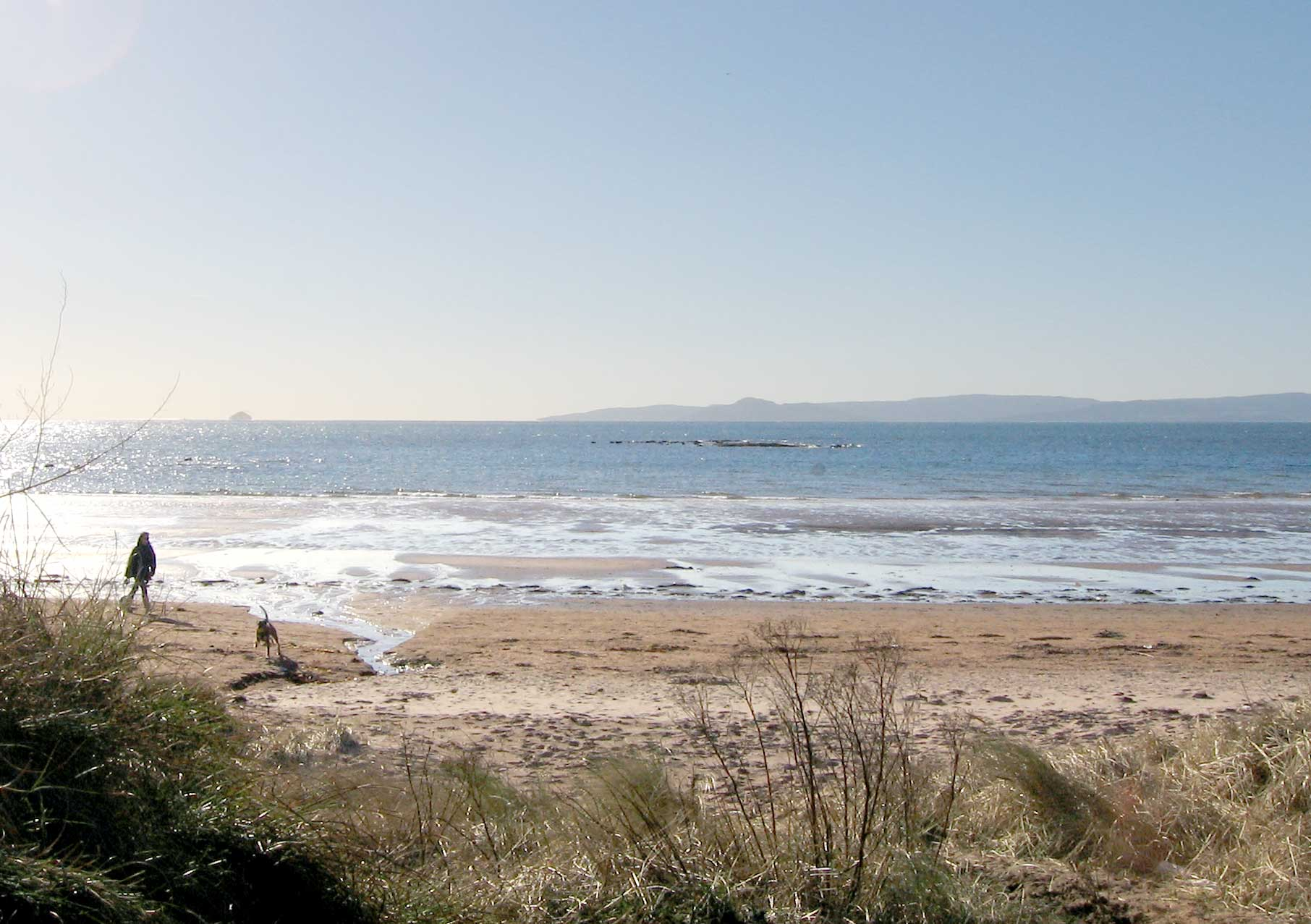
The Seamill beach looks south down the outer firth towards southern Arran and Ailsa Craig

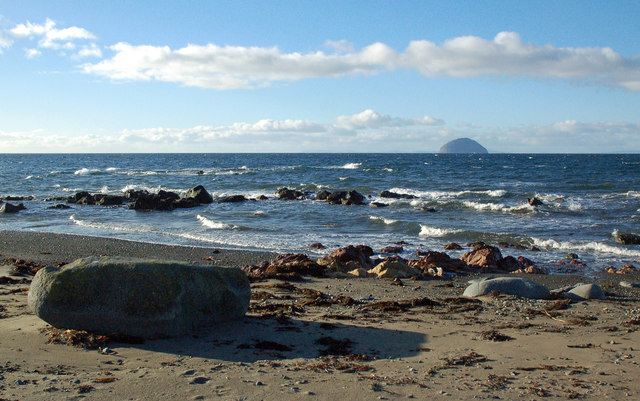
Firth of Clyde View

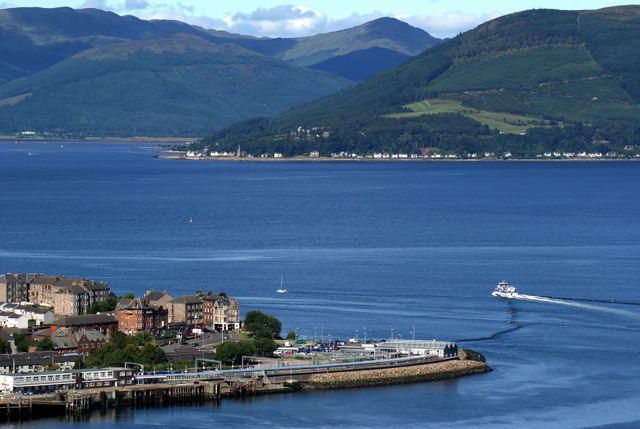
Gourock and the Firth of Clyde

At the north of the Firth, Loch Long and the Gare Loch join the Firth; these lochs are separated by the Rosneath Peninsula. Off Greenock, an anchorage known as the Tail of the Bank narrows the estuary of the River Clyde to two miles (three kilometres) wide. (The "Bank" is a reference to a sandbank and shoal) The River Clyde estuary has an upper tidal limit located at the tidal weir next to Glasgow Green.

The geographical (and popular) distinction between the Firth and the River Clyde is vague. Some refer to Dumbarton as being "on the Firth of Clyde"; while at the same time, the residents of Port Glasgow and Greenock often refer to the part of the Firth that lies to the north of those areas as "the river".

The Firth encompasses many islands and peninsulas. Twelve ferry routes connect them to each other and the mainland. The majority of the ferry services are run by Caledonian MacBrayne and one by Western Ferries, and many of the routes are lifeline services for communities living in remote areas. The Firth has no fixed link transport infrastructure connections (bridge or tunnel), linking the shores or islands. The lowest fixed crossing over the Clyde is the Erskine Bridge, opened on 2 July 1971.

There are two canal connections from the Firth. The Forth and Clyde Canal at Bowling, West Dunbartonshire and the Crinan Canal at Ardrishaig.

The Irish Sea and the Firth of Clyde's southerly boundary, as defined by the Scottish Government, is between the southern tip of the Kintyre Peninsula and Corsewall Point on the Rhins of Galloway.

The Firth joins the strait between Scotland and Northern Ireland, called the North Channel, at the north of the Irish Sea. The deepest part of the channel is the Beaufort's Dyke, at 312 metres (1,024 ft).

=== Highland Boundary Fault ===
The Highland Boundary Fault enters the Firth off the east coast of Kintyre Peninsula in the south. The fault crosses the south eastern tip of the Cowal Peninsula at Toward Point, where it can be seen on the surface by the presence of Old Red Sandstone. The fault continues to Helensburgh in the north, then continues past the east coast of Scotland. The fault can be followed across Scotland for at least 240 km (150 mi). The fault is of great age and its remains are broken by more recent geological movement of the earth's crust.

=== Sea Lochs ===
Fourteen sea lochs join the Firth, the largest being Loch Fyne.

- Campbeltown Loch
- Loch Fyne - East Loch Tarbert; Loch Gilp; Loch Gair and Loch Shira
- Gare Loch
- Holy Loch
- Loch Long - Loch Goil
- Loch Ranza
- Loch Riddon off the Kyles of Bute
- Loch Ryan
- Loch Striven

=== Peninsulas ===
- Cowal Peninsula

The Cowal Peninsula extends into the Firth of Clyde and forms the main western shoreline of the upper Firth. The main town on the Cowal Peninsula is Dunoon. Ardlamont Point on the Ardlamont Peninsula, which extends off the Cowal Peninsula, is the southern tip of the Ardlamont and Cowal Peninsulas.

The ferries across the Firth save time compared to traveling "round by road", via Loch Eck side (A815 road), the Rest and Be Thankful (A83 road) and Loch Lomond side (A82 road).The service between Dunoon and Gourock in Inverclyde is operated by Caledonian MacBrayne, the Public Service provider. This service carries only foot passengers and connects directly with the ScotRail service to Glasgow.Western Ferries is a Private Limited Company; it operates the service between Hunters Quay and McInroy's Point near to Gourock. This service carries all types of vehicular transport, as well as foot passengers.

- Kintyre Peninsula

The Kintyre peninsula forms the main west coastline of the lower Firth.

- Rosneath Peninsula

The Rosneath peninsula is formed by the Gare Loch in the east, and Loch Long in the west; both merge with the upper Firth of Clyde. There is a Caledonian MacBrayne passenger-only service across the Firth to Gourock from Kilcreggan.

=== Firth Islands ===
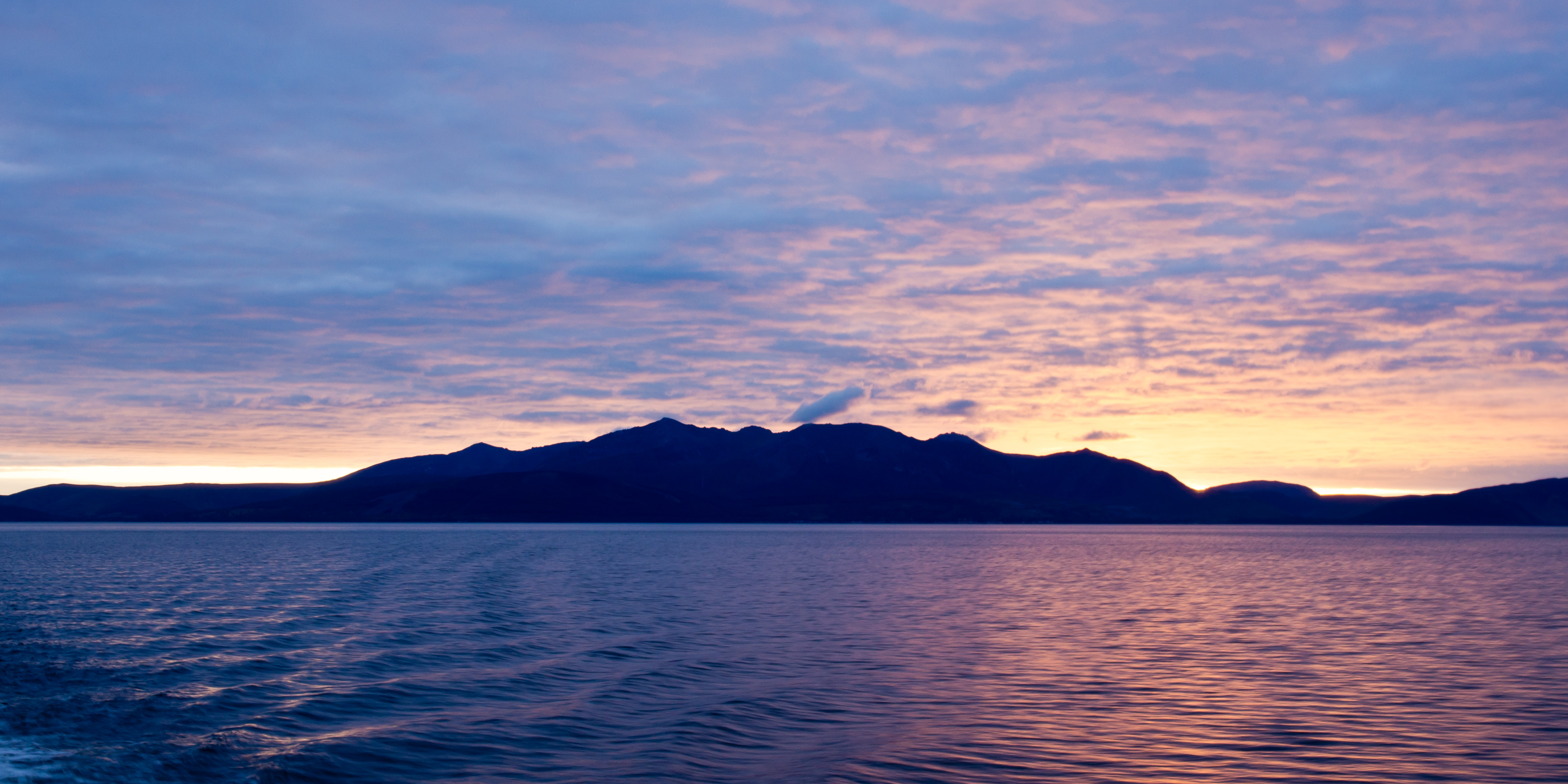
Arran sunset

There are around forty islands and skerries in the Firth. The largest three all have thriving communities and have ferry services connecting them to the mainland. They are:

- Arran
- Bute
- Great Cumbrae

Ailsa Craig is a small island, formed by the remains of a volcanic plug in the Firth. Ailsa Craig Common Green Granite and Ailsa Craig Blue Hone Granite are quarried there for the production of Curling Stones, manufactured by Kays of Scotland.

Holy Isle, a small island lying in Lamlash Bay, Isle of Arran. At the north of the Holy Isle, there is a religious resort.

Burnt Islands, are three small islands located in the Kyles of Bute, a National Senic Area.

Horse Isle, near Ardrossan. The island is a nature reserve run by the RSPB.

=== Firth Lighthouses ===
The Northern Lighthouse Board is responsible for some of the navigation aids around Scotland's coast. Others are the responsibility of the local Competent Harbour Authority.

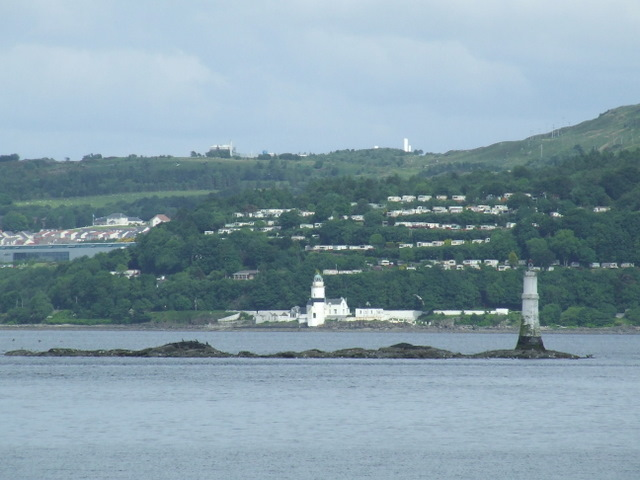
The Gantocks with Cloch Lighthouse behind

There are lighthouses at:

- Cloch Point on the Inverclyde coast.
- Toward Point Lighthouse on the Cowal Peninsula.
- Little Cumbrae Lighthouse
- Pladda, South of Arran
- Ailsa Craig Lighthouse, Ailsa Craig
- Pillar Rock Point lighthouse, also known as Holy Isle Outer Lighthouse, Arran
- Holy Isle, Inner lighthouse, also known as Holy Isle, Arran
- Corsewall Lighthouse, Corsewall Point, Kirkcolm
- Davaar Lighthouse, Davaar Island, Campbeltown Loch
- Sanda Lighthouse, Sanda Island, off the south of Kintyre
- Turnberry Lighthouse, Turnberry, South Ayrshire

There are navigation beacons at:

- The Gantocks Rocks and Navigation Beacon, off the coast at Dunoon, Cowal Peninsula.
- Horse Isle Beacon, Horse Isle, Ardrossan Built 1811.

=== Firth shoreline settlements ===
- Ardbeg, Ardrossan, Ascog, Ayr
- Barassie, Blackwaterfoot, Brodick
- Campbeltown, Cardross, Carradale, Corrie, Catacol
- Dumbarton, Dunoon, Dunure
- Fairlie
- Gourock, Greenock, Girvan, Grogport
- Helensburgh, Hunters Quay
- Innellan, Inverkip, Irvine
- Kilcreggan, Kilchattan Bay, Kildonan, Kilmory, Kilmun, Kingarth, Kirn
- Lagg, Lamlash, Largs, Lochranza
- Machrie, Maidens, Millport
- Peninver, Pirnmill, Port Bannatyne, Portencross, Port Glasgow, Portkil, Prestwick
- Rothesay
- Saddell, Sannox, Saltcoats, Seamill, Skipness, Skelmorlie, Sliddery, Southend, Stevenston, Strone
- Tarbert, Toward, Troon, Turnberry
- Wemyss Bay, West Kilbride, Whiting Bay

== Nature and conservation ==
Clyde Sill MPA(NC)
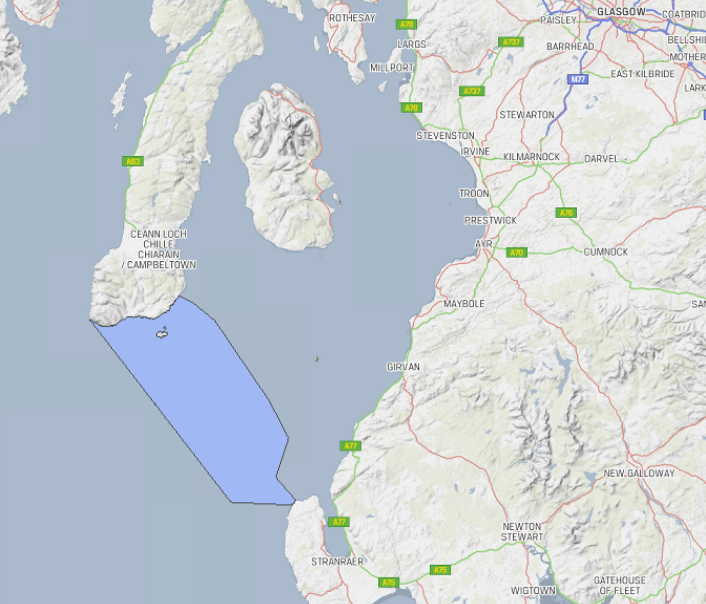
- Location and extent of the Clyde Sill MPA in the Firth of Clyde
- Location: Firth of Clyde, Scotland
- Area: 712 km^{2} (275 sq mi)
- Designation: Scottish Government
- Established: 2014
- Operator: Marine Scotland

The Field Studies Council has a marine research station, based in Millport, on the island of Great Cumbrae.

Common seals and grey seals abound in the Firth. Harbour porpoises are also common. While dolphins are much less common, some were spotted in the upper reaches of the Firth in the summer of 2005. Very uncommon are humpback whales, as are the minke whales. Even rarer are orcas.

Also, in 2005, the Firth had the second-highest number of basking shark sightings in Scotland (after the Minch). These huge sharks seem to particularly favour the warm, shallow waters surrounding Pladda, south of Arran.

However, although commercial fishing was at one time intensive in the Firth's many fishing towns, today the only catches of commercial interest remaining in the Clyde waters are prawns, lobsters, herring, mussels, and crayfish.

=== Conservation ===
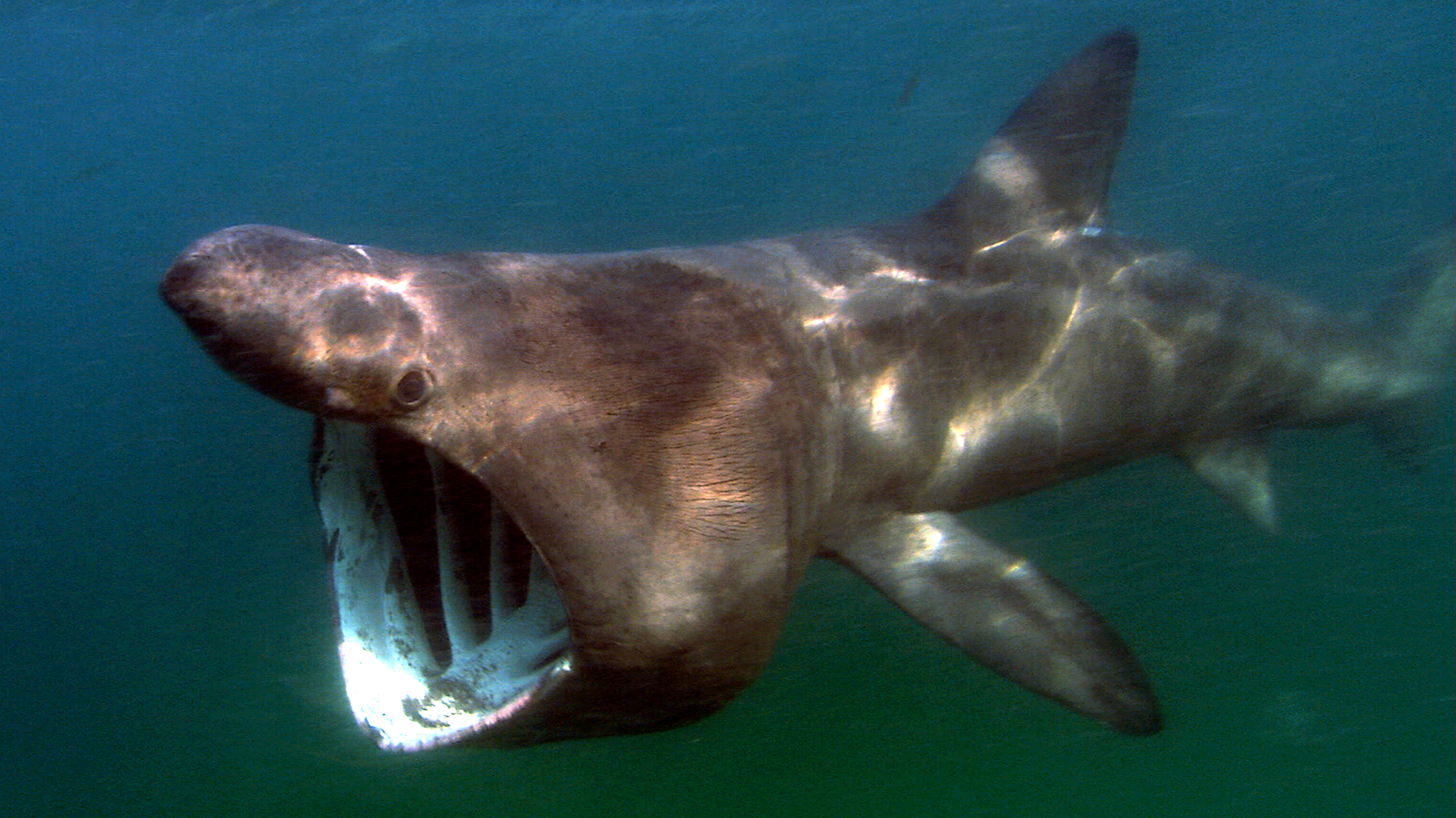
Basking shark (Cetorhinus maximus

On 5 September 2000, the Inner Clyde Estuary received a RAMSAR designation with ite number 1036; the area covered is 1,825 hectares (4,510 acres). (Coordinates: 55°56'32"N 04°36'32"W)

In September 2008, Scotland's first No Take Zone (NTZ) was introduced in Lamlash Bay, on the Isle of Arran. The result of a community effort, led by the Community of Arran Seabed Trust (C.O.A.S.T). The NTZ was introduced to protect delicate marine communities, such as Maerl. Maerl is a slow-growing coral-like calcareous red algae (it grows only 1 mm per year) and is an important Scottish species. Maerl beds are locations of high biodiversity and are crucial nursery grounds for both young scallops and young fish. Studies show that both scallop dredging and organic waste from fish farms, significantly impact Maerl. Scallop dredging on a Maerl bed has been found to kill over 70% of the Maerl. Monitoring the dredged bed over the next four years found no discernible recovery, suggesting that Maerl beds would require many years free of disturbance in order to recover.

In 2014, 71,200 hectares (712 km^{2}) at the south of the Firth between Kintyre Peninsula and the Rhins of Galloway, on the North Channel boundary. Designated a Marine Protected Area, the (Clyde Sill MPA), the NatureScot Site Code is 10414, the EU Site Code is 555560461. The MPA covers a distinctive sill where fresher water of the Firth mixes with the cooler, more saline water of the North Channel. This is a rich environment for plankton, which provide food for fish, that are in turn eaten by higher marine predators and seabirds.

On 16 December 2015, an area to the south of Arran received a Marine Protected Area designation.

=== Water quality ===
The water quality of the Firth is monitored by the Scottish Environment Protection Agency (SEPA). SEPA have had a monitoring buoy located off the coast of Dunoon since 2009, with data collected every 15 minutes.

There is also a monitoring buoy further up the Clyde at Govan.

Scottish Water has the responsibility for the collection, treatment and disposal of waste water in Scotland. Scottish Water has installed improved waste water treatment and disposal systems around the Firth in the last decades, consequently the Firth's environment has improved.

== Shipping ==
The Firth of Clyde has some of the deepest sea channels in Northern Europe. It can accommodate the largest Capesize vessels afloat today. As a result, the Clyde has one of the UK's leading ports, at Clydeport, part of The Peel Group. The facility handles cargo from container ships at the Greenock Ocean Terminal.

=== Shipyards ===
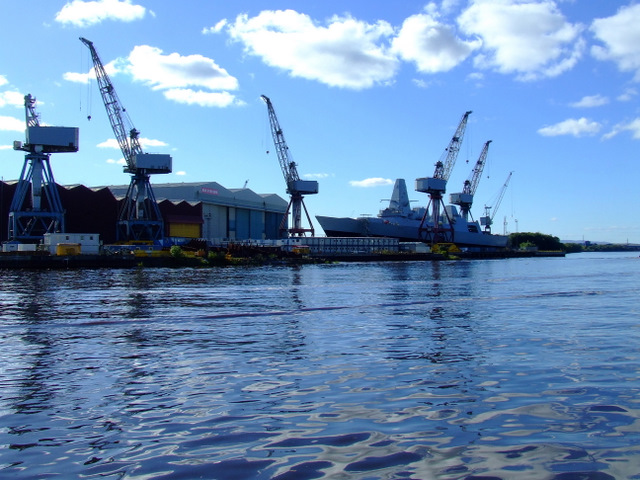
BAE Govan Shipyard - geograph.org.uk - 2088722

On the upper Clyde, at Govan and Scotstoun both in Glasgow, two major shipyards are still in operation. They are owned by BAE Systems, whose major client is the Royal Navy.

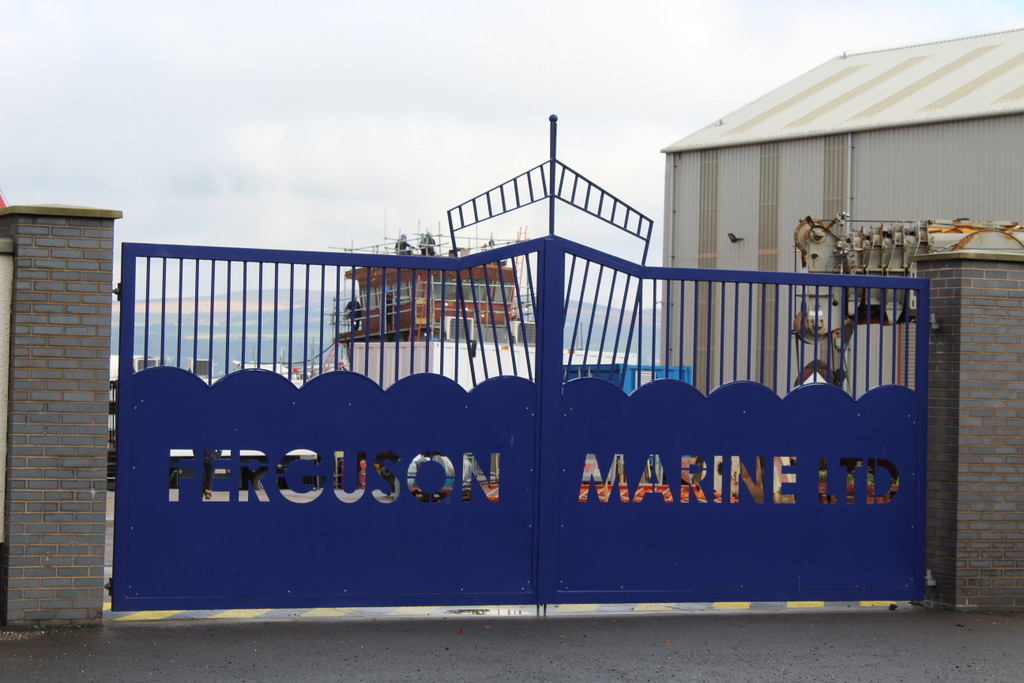
Ferguson Marine shipyard gate - geograph.org.uk - 6368530

On the lower Clyde, only one shipyard still operates, Ferguson Marine, which is located next to Newark Castle, Port Glasgow. The Scottish Government now own the yard.

The Garvel Dry Dock in Greenock continues in operation for ship repair. The large Inchgreen Dry Dock in Greenock is in occasional use.

The remains of former sites of shipyards on the Clyde are being redeveloped into areas that contain residential housing, leisure facilities, and commercial buildings.

On the Firth itself, Ardmaleish Boatbuilding are based at Ardmaleish, near to Port Bannatyne on the Isle of Bute.

=== Cruise terminal ===
The Greenock Cruise Terminal, operated by Clydeport part of The Peel Group. A new twin berth terminal was opened on 25 August 2023.

In March 2025 the Greenock Cruise Terminal was leased to Global Ports Holding Ltd with a fifty year contract.

==== Visiting liners ====
- Queen Anne
- Regal Princess
- Queen Mary 2
- Mein Schiff 2
- Mein Schiff 3
- Celebrity Eclipse
- Celebrity Silhouette
- Sirena
- Jewel of the Seas
- Carnival Legend
- Caribbean Princess
- Celebrity Apex
- Disney Dream
- AIDAluna
- L'Austral
- Arcadia
- Majestic Princess
- MS Nieuw Statendam

==== Historic liner visits ====
- Queen Elizabeth 2

=== Shipwrecks ===
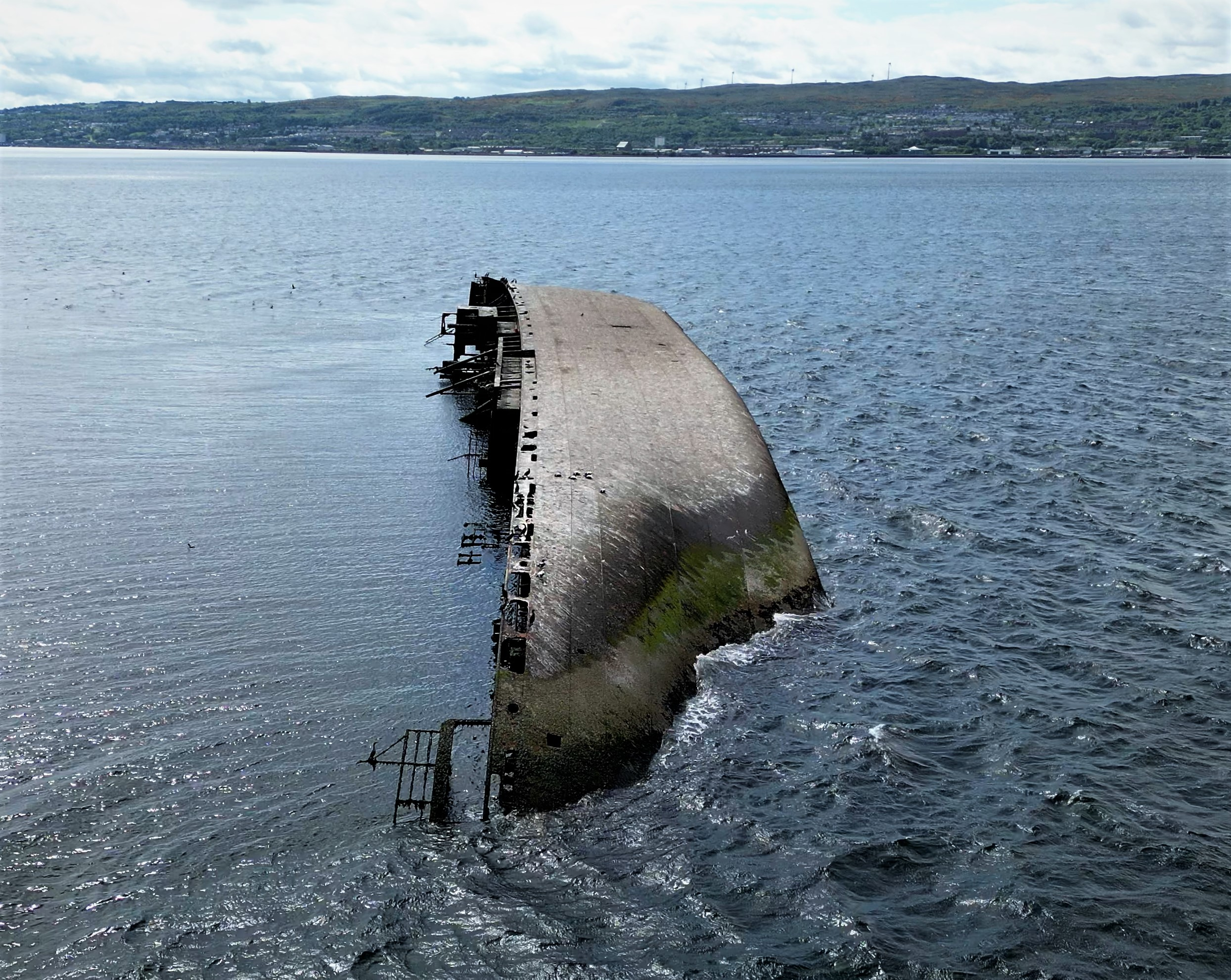
MV Captayannis

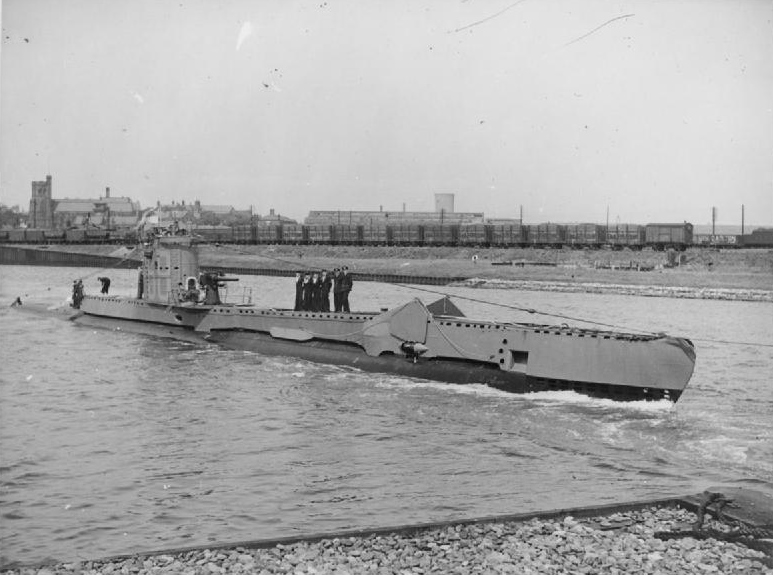
HMSM Vitality, re Untamed FL22809

Shipwreck diving is a popular activity on the Firth, with many wreck sites to explore. Military wrecks have protection under the Protection of Military Remains Act 1986.

- Enterprise, 19 November 1882, collision then sank.
- Mary Anning, 23 January 1885, cargo steamship, collision and sank Tail of the Bank.
- Louise, 3 February 1893, steam lighter, sank due to heavy seas Rothesay Bay.
- Valkyrie II, collision and sank, 5 July 1895. 1893 competed in the eighth America's Cup (lost).
- Wallachia, 29 September 1895, sank after grounding in fog.
- Champion, steam paddle tug, 12 December 1896, collision then sank.
- Greenock, steam dredger, launched 4 November 1876, sank after collision 18 November 1902.
- HMS Seagull, sank after collision 30 September 1918.
- U-33, German submarine, attacked and sunk, south of Pladda, Arran, 12 February 1940.
- Penola, collision and broke up 9 November 1940. Off Toward point.
- HMS Adept, tug, 17 March 1942, grounded and sank, Sanda Island.
- HMS Vandal, 24 February 1943, sunk in an accident.
- HMS Dasher, 27 March 1943, blew up and sank.
- HMS Breda, steam yacht, 18 February 1944, collision, then sank in Campbeltown Loch.
- HMS Sealion, 13 March 1946, used for target practice.
- MV Akka, 4 April 1956, sank after grounding on the Gantocks rocks.
- MV Captayannis, 27 January 1974, Tail of the Bank. Known locally as the Sugar Boat.

==== Salvaged wrecks ====
- Comet II, launched in 1821, collision and sank 21 October 1825, salvaged 21 July 1826.
- HMS K13, submarine, sank 29 January 1917, salvaged 15 March 1917.
- Varyag, grounded and sank 5 February 1920, salvaged (scrapped where beached 1924 - 1926).
- Maillé Brézé, 30 April 1931, Lost by accidental explosion. Salvaged summer of 1954.
- HMS Untamed, submarine, sank 30 May 1943, salvaged 5 July 1943.

== Watersports ==
=== Marinas ===
There are marinas located at the following locations around the Firth.

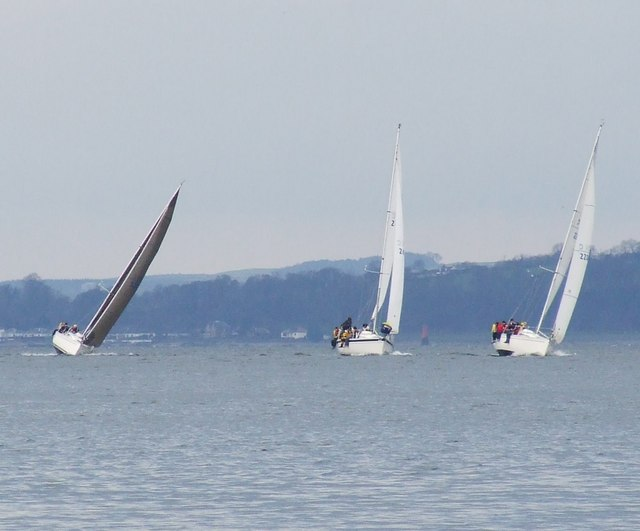
Yachts off Inverkip

- Inverkip, Kip Marina
- Sandbank, Holy Loch Marina
- Portavadie, Portavadie Marina
- Rothesay, Rothesay Harbour Marina
- Ardrossan, Clyde Marina
- Troon, Troon Yacht Haven
- Rhu, Rhu Marina
- Greenock, James Watt Dock Marina
- Largs, Largs Yacht Haven
- Port Bannatyne, Port Bannatyne Marina
- Campbeltown, Campbeltown Marina
- Stranraer, Stranraer Marina
- Tarbert, Tarbert Harbour Marina

=== Watersports Clubs ===
- Loch Goil Watersports Club
- Helensburgh Sailing Club
- Holy Loch Sailing Club
- Firth of Clyde Coastal Rowing Club, Largs
- Toward Seasports Club
- Mudhook Yacht Club, Helensburgh
- Royal Gourock Yacht Club
- Royal Northern and Clyde Yacht Club, Rhu
- Troon Cruising Club
- Ayr Sea Angling Club
- Kyles of Bute Sailing Club
- Ballantrae Yacht Club, Ballantrae
- Prestwick Sailing Club
- Kyles Coastal Rowing Club, Tighnabruaich
- Royal West of Scotland Amateur Boat Club, Greenock
- Kintyre Seasports, Campbeltown
- Arran Coastal Rowing Club, Lamlash
- Royal Western Yacht Club, Inverkip
- Clyde Cruising Club

== Armed Forces ==
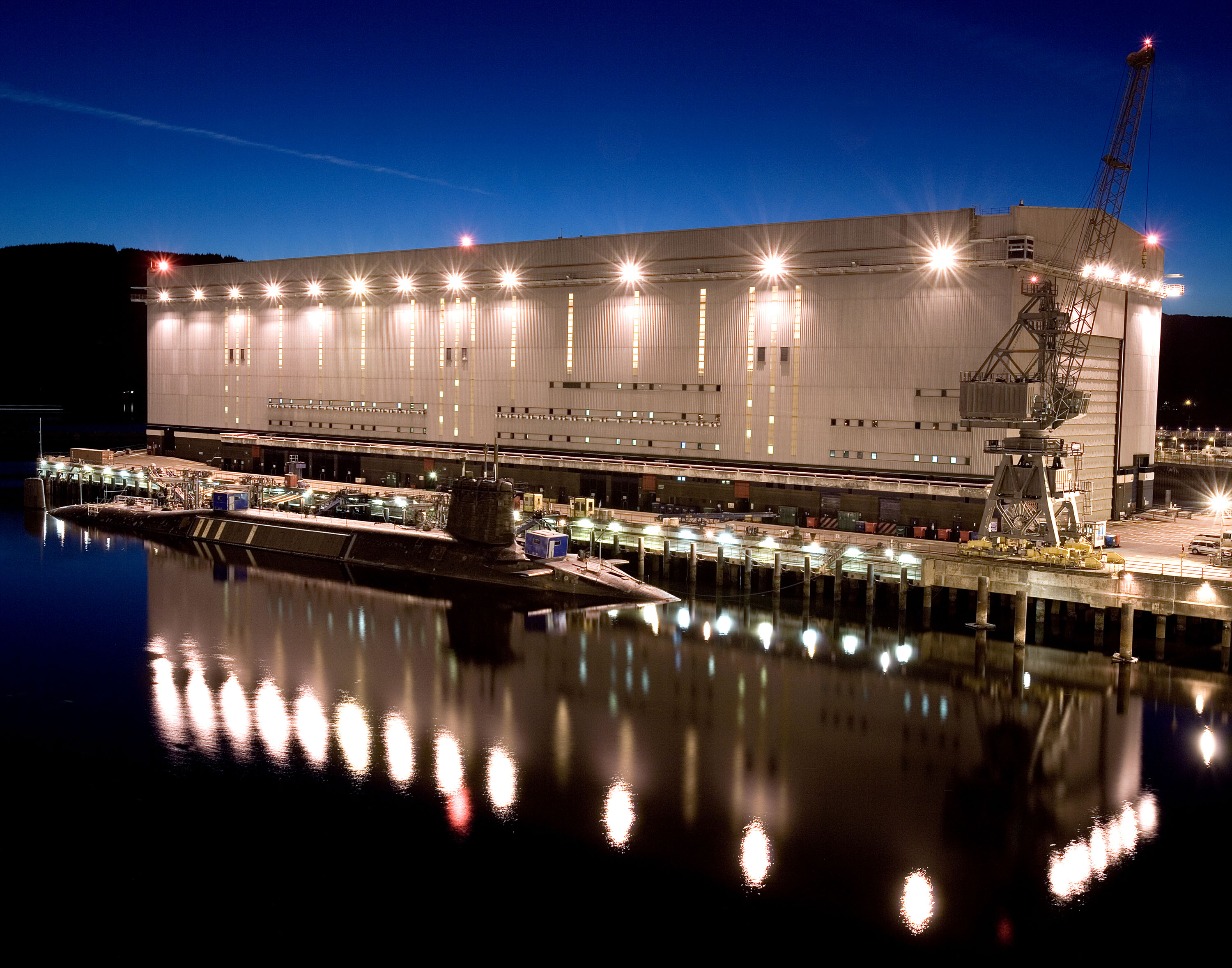
HMS Vigilant alongside Faslane Naval Base. MOD 45147682

The Royal Navy has a significant presence on the Firth of Clyde. HMNB Clyde is known as Faslane within the navy and is located on Loch Long. HMNB Clyde's role is with the servicing and maintenance of the UK submarine defence fleet. The base has other locations around the Firth.

Babcock International are involved in the engineering and operations at the base.

On Loch Long, at Glen Mallan, the Northern Ammunition Jetty was refurbished, to accommodate the navy’s new aircraft carriers, HMS Queen Elizabeth and HMS Prince of Wales, with work completed in January 2022. The jetty is part of the DM Glen Douglas military munitions depot. Plans have been announced in February 2024 to demolish an undisclosed part of the site.

== History ==
The Firth of Clyde has always been an important sea route from the earliest times. For example, the Battle of Largs, which was fought on the Firth, in 1263, was a geopolitical turning point: it marked the end of Norse ambitions in Britain. Beginning in the 16th century, the Firth increasingly became a conduit for commercial and industrial products, including: herring; timber; wine; sugar; tobacco; textiles; iron and steel; coal; oil; industrial chemicals; distillation and brewing; ships, locomotives, and other vehicles; and other manufactured products.

In the middle of the 19th century, the sport of yachting became popular on the Firth. The area became famous worldwide for its significant contribution to yachting and yachtbuilding with notable designers including: William Fife III; Alfred Mylne; G L Watson; David Boyd. It was also the location of many famous yacht yards. Clyde-built wooden yachts are still known for quality and style today. One yard of note was Alexander Robertson & Sons, the yard was located on the Holy Loch.

The "lower Clyde" shipyards of Greenock and Port Glasgow, most notably Scott Lithgow, played an important historical role in shipbuilding. The PS Comet was the first successful steamboat in Europe. Well into the 20th century, a large proportion of the world's ship construction took place around the upper Firth and River Clyde.

=== Tourism ===
With the advent of tourism in Victorian times, the Firth became popular with Glaswegians and residents of neighbouring towns and counties who travelled "doon the watter" (the Firth) on Clyde steamers to holiday in the picturesque seaside towns and villages that line the Firth, with the more wealthy building substantial holiday homes along its coasts. Many towns, such as Gourock, Largs, Ayr, Dunoon, Rothesay, flourished during this period and became fully fledged resorts with well-appointed hotels and attractions. Golf courses, including major championship courses, proliferated.

Today, tourism, sport and recreation, and heritage history continue to attract visitors from across the world. The steam-powered PS Waverley—in addition to its regular service—still makes cruising trips to the coastal towns that have been popular tourist destinations since the 19th century. The Firth is ringed by many castles and buildings of historical importance that are open to the public, including Inveraray Castle, Brodick Castle, the opulent Mount Stuart House on the Isle of Bute, and Culzean Castle, which is the most visited attraction owned by the National Trust for Scotland. Ocean liners frequently call at Greenock, and Glasgow International Airport and Glasgow Prestwick Airport are nearby. There is frequent rail service to and from the Clyde coast, including links to Oban and Fort William, with city terminals in Glasgow and Edinburgh. There is also daily ferry service between the area and Belfast.

=== Sport and recreation ===
==== 1908 Summer Olympic Games ====
The Firth hosted the 1908 summer olympics, with the 12-metre (39 ft) sailing yacht races.

=== Shipyards ===
The Firth of Clyde, like the River Clyde, has historically been an important centre of shipbuilding and shipping. Upriver, there have been shipbuilding and engineering centres at Glasgow, Govan, Clydebank, Dumbarton, and Renfrew. Downriver, there have been major yards at Greenock and Port Glasgow; smaller yards at Irvine, Ardrossan, Troon, and Campbeltown; and various other boatyards, including those at Hunters Quay, Port Bannatyne, and Fairlie. Today, the Ferguson Marine shipbuilding yard, adjacent to Newark Castle, Port Glasgow, is the last merchant shipbuilder on the Clyde, and it is owned by the Scottish Government. In Greenock, the large dry dock and ship-repair facilities at Inchgreen opened in 1964, and were subsequently taken over by Scott Lithgow. The dry dock there is 305 metres (1,001 ft) long and 44 metres (144 ft) wide. With the demise of Scott Lithgow and Cammell Laird, their facilities came under the management of Clydeport.

=== Ports ===
The Finnart Oil Terminal in Loch Long, was connected by pipeline to the former Grangemouth Refinery on the Firth of Forth. Both owned by Petroineos, a joint venture between Ineos and Petrochina. A second pipeline brougt back refined oil products to the Finart Oil Terminal for export (in smaller oil tankers) mainly to Northern Ireland. The Finnart Oil Terminal ceased operation around June 2025.

The Hunterston Ore Terminal was constructed to facilitate the transport of bulk ore, but later mainly dealt with coal imports, and closed in 2016.

The ExxonMobil (ESSO) Fuel Oil Terminal site at Bowling.

There was a jetty built as part of Inverkip Power Station, for oil deliveries by oil tanker.

=== Armed Forces ===
HMS Gannet, the Fleet Air Arm Search and Rescue site at Prestwick Airport. The helicopters (Sea King) that were based here were used in the rescue and airlift operations across the United Kingdom. Fleet Air Arm Search and Rescue operations closed on 1 January 2016, with Maritime and Coastguard Agency taking over the role.

==== Submarine Squadron 14 ====
Cold War; The United States of America maintained a US Navy base during the Cold War, in the Holy Loch, off the Firth. Submarine Squadron 14 or SUBRON14, also known as Site one, Holy Loch was in operation between 1 July 1958, up until the end of the Cold War. The last deployed Submarine Tender departed the Holy Loch and Firth on 3 March 1992.

World War II; During World War II, Glasgow and the Firth of Clyde became the main entry point into Britain for the Allied forces with the formation of The Clyde Emergency Port, officially opened on 12 September 1940. With merchant shipping, military personnel, and equipment moving through the port. The Firth was used as the assembly and despatch point for Atlantic convoys. The Firth hosted the United Kingdom's largest naval base for the duration of the war. In 1942, an underwater oil pipeline was laid across the Firth, Operation Pluto, the world's first deep-water test of this technology. This was only one of many innovations designed to support air, maritime, and territorial combat during World War II.

The Holy Loch was used as a base for Royal Navy Submarines, during World War II. Namely the 3rd Submarine Flotilla (United Kingdom). HMS Forth was for a time based in the loch as the submarine depot ship.

During both World wars, the Cloch Point To Dunoon Anti-submarine Boom was in place to protect the upper Firth.

=== Environment ===
Since the Industrial Revolution, the natural environment of the Firth has been compromised. Many locations have been affected by a succession of industrial and military developments along the shoreline. Including the former sites of shipyards; Hunterston B nuclear power station; Inverkip power station; ExxonMobil fuel oil terminal site at Bowling; Nobel explosives plant at Ardeer and the Hunterston Ore Terminal. Many of these locations are now dormant or being redeveloped.

== Climate ==
Greenock

Climate chart (precipitation, max. and min. temperature)
J	F	M	A	M	J	J	A	S	O	N	D
75 6 1	55 7 1	54 8 2	38 11 3	34 15 6	35 17 9	39 19 11	52 18 11	45 16 8	81 12 6	68 9 3	69 7 2
- █ Average max. and min. temperatures in °C
- █ Precipitation totals in mm
- Source: Precipitation
Imperial conversion
J	F	M	A	M	J	J	A	S	O	N	D
2.9 43 34	2.1 45 34	2.1 46 36	1.5 52 37	1.4 59 43	1.4 63 48	1.5 66 52	2.1 64 52	1.8 61 46	3.2 54 43	2.7 48 37	2.7 45 36
- █ Average max. and min. temperatures in °F
- █ Precipitation totals in inches

The Firth's maritime climate is considerably milder than continental locations at the same latitude. Whilst the reason for this mild climate is the subject of debate it is historically considered to be due to the moderating influence of the North Atlantic Drift, a warm oceanic current that is the eastern extension of the Gulf Stream which originates in the tropical waters of the Gulf of Mexico.

== Concerns ==
Worldwide, human-made causes including the over-exploitation and the pollution of water systems, are among the biggest threats and concerns which are damaging aquatic ecosystems and in extreme cases cause ecological death.

The durability of plastics in the natural environment, plastic pollution, imposes threats on aquatic life and the aquatic ecosystems. Plastic debris may result in entanglement and ingestion by aquatic life such as birds, fish and marine mammals, causing severe injury or death. Human livelihoods and life itself can also be impacted by plastic pollution. In severe cases, with effects on surrounding tourism or real estate value, the clogging of drains and other hydraulic infrastructure leading to increased flood risk and further pollution.

== See also ==
- River Clyde
- Islands of the Clyde
- Irish Sea
- Inner Seas off the West Coast of Scotland
- Seas west of Scotland
- European Atlas of the Seas
- List of seas
- Recreational diving
- Wreck diving
- Underwater diving environment
- Marine Protected Areas in Scotland

== Sources ==
- The Clyde: River and Firth, 1907 and reissued 2010, Neil Munro, with illustrations by Mary Y and Y Young Hunter
- The Firth of Clyde, 1952, George Blake
- Glasgow and the Clyde, 1965, Ward Lock Guide
- Clyde Coast Connections, 2010, Neil Grieves
- From Comet to Cal Mac : Two Centuries of Hebridean and Clyde Shipping, 2011, Donald E Meek and Bruce Peter
- Firth of Clyde: Sailing Directions and Anchorages, 2012, Clyde Cruising Club
- HM Naval Base: Clyde, 2012, Keith Hall
