= Toward Point Lighthouse =

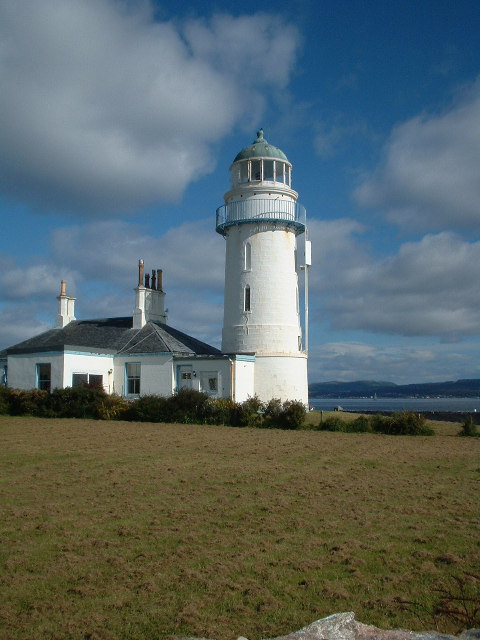
- Toward Point Lighthouse
- Location: Cowal Peninsula
- OS grid: NS1362367226
- Coordinates: 55°51′37″N 4°58′41″W

Tower
- Constructed: 1812
- Built by: Robert Stevenson
- Construction: White circular tower
- Height: 19 m (62 ft)
- Operator: Clyde Port Authority
- Heritage: category B listed building

Light
- First lit: 1812
- Focal height: 21 m (69 ft)
- Range: 22 nautical miles
- Characteristic: Fl. W 10sec

Toward Point Lighthouse is situated in the south of the Cowal Peninsula, near the village of Toward, Argyll and Bute, Scotland. It marks the point where Loch Striven meets the Firth of Clyde. There has been a lighthouse here since 1812.

Toward Point Lighthouse was completed in 1812. It was built by Robert Stevenson (1772–1850) for the Cumbrae Lighthouse Trust. Two lighthouse keepers' houses were added in the later 1800s. A white building on the foreshore housed the foghorn mechanism, originally a steam engine and then diesel engines. The foghorn was taken out of operation in the 1990s. The keeper's cottages were sold in 2012 and are now a private home.

Toward Point marks the extreme south-westerly point of the Highland Boundary Fault as it crosses the Scottish mainland. The Highland Boundary Fault does not run through Toward Point, but about one kilometre to the west it can be located on the Toward shore by the presence of Serpentinite and the sudden change from younger sedimentary rocks to much older metamorphic rocks, notably Psammite.

== Gallery ==
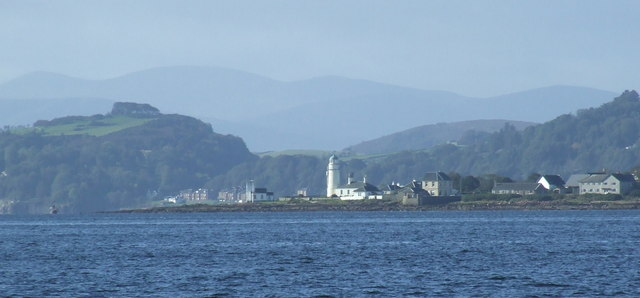
Toward Point lighthouse

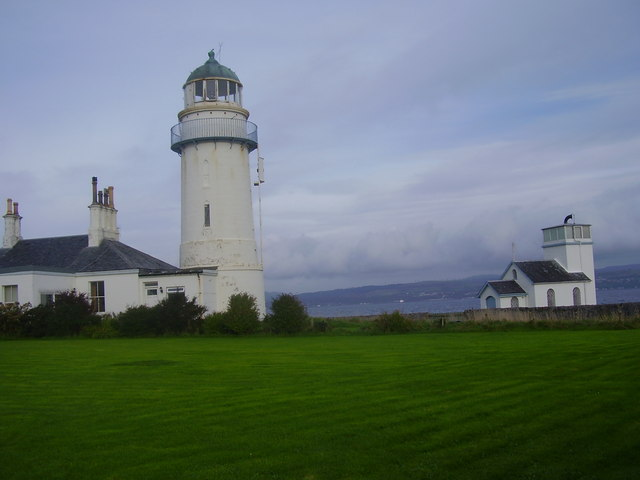
Lighthouse and foghorn building

== See also ==
- List of lighthouses in Scotland
- List of places in Argyll and Bute
- Castle Toward
