= Lighthouses on the Isle of Arran =

Three lighthouses can be found around the shores of the Isle of Arran in the Firth of Clyde. One is located on the island of Pladda in the south and the other two can be found on Holy Island in Lamlash Bay to the east of Arran. All three are still in service and maintained by the Northern Lighthouse Board. They are now fully automatic since the electrification of both lighthouses on Holy Isle in 1977.

== History ==
Until up to the appointment of the Commissioners of the Northern Lighthouses (later Northern Lighthouse Board) by royal act in 1786, just 4 lighthouses existed in the whole of Scotland. Over the course of the following 200 years, the NLB expanded greatly and is now responsible for 206 lighthouses, 163 buoys, 29 beacons, 2 supply and maintenance ships and a variety of other traditional and modern navigational aids. For a long time, lighthouses mostly burned wood, coal and candles before oil became predominant. Oil was mostly used in the form of whale oil and colza oil before the introduction of kerosene in the mid 19th century and eventually electricity. Mainland stations excepted, lights were mostly staffed by 3 lighthouse keepers with 3 colleagues on shore leave on a 4 weeks on 4 weeks off rotation. Keepers were expected to be on duty at night to supervise the proper function of the lights, keep a 24-hour watch for fog and maintain and service the station during daytime. A first programme of automation in the early 20th century reduced the numbers necessary to staff a station and many lighthouse keepers were made redundant. In the 1980s and 1990s, all Scottish lighthouses were eventually fully automated and the process was completed in 1998.

== Lighthouses ==
=== Pladda ===
Pladda lighthouse is a white tower with a height of 29 metres. It is the oldest of the Arran lighthouses and situated on the Isle of Pladda just off the Southern tip of the Isle of Arran. Pladda lighthouse is not only the oldest lighthouse around Arran but also one of the oldest lighthouses in Scotland. Pladda lighthouse was built in 1790 by Thomas Smith and showing a lower light from a small lantern 20 feet below the main light to allow seafareres to distinguish Pladda from other lighthouses close by, notably those on the Mull of Kintyre, Cumbrae and Copeland at the Irish coast. The lighthouse was rebuilt between 1821 and 1830. Pladda was one of Northern Lights' lighthouses where paraffin as a new fuel together with multiple wicks were tested successfully in 1870. This allowed substantial savings with a simultaneous increase in power between 10% and 100%. Fog signals were introduced in the 1870s as well. In 1901, the formerly fixed light was changed to a more powerful group-flashing which was Northern Light's plan for most Scottish lighthouses at the time. Pladda lighthouse operates fully automatic since 1990. Pladdas position is 55° 25.512'N, 005° 07.113'W. Its light flashes Fl.(3)30s40m23M.

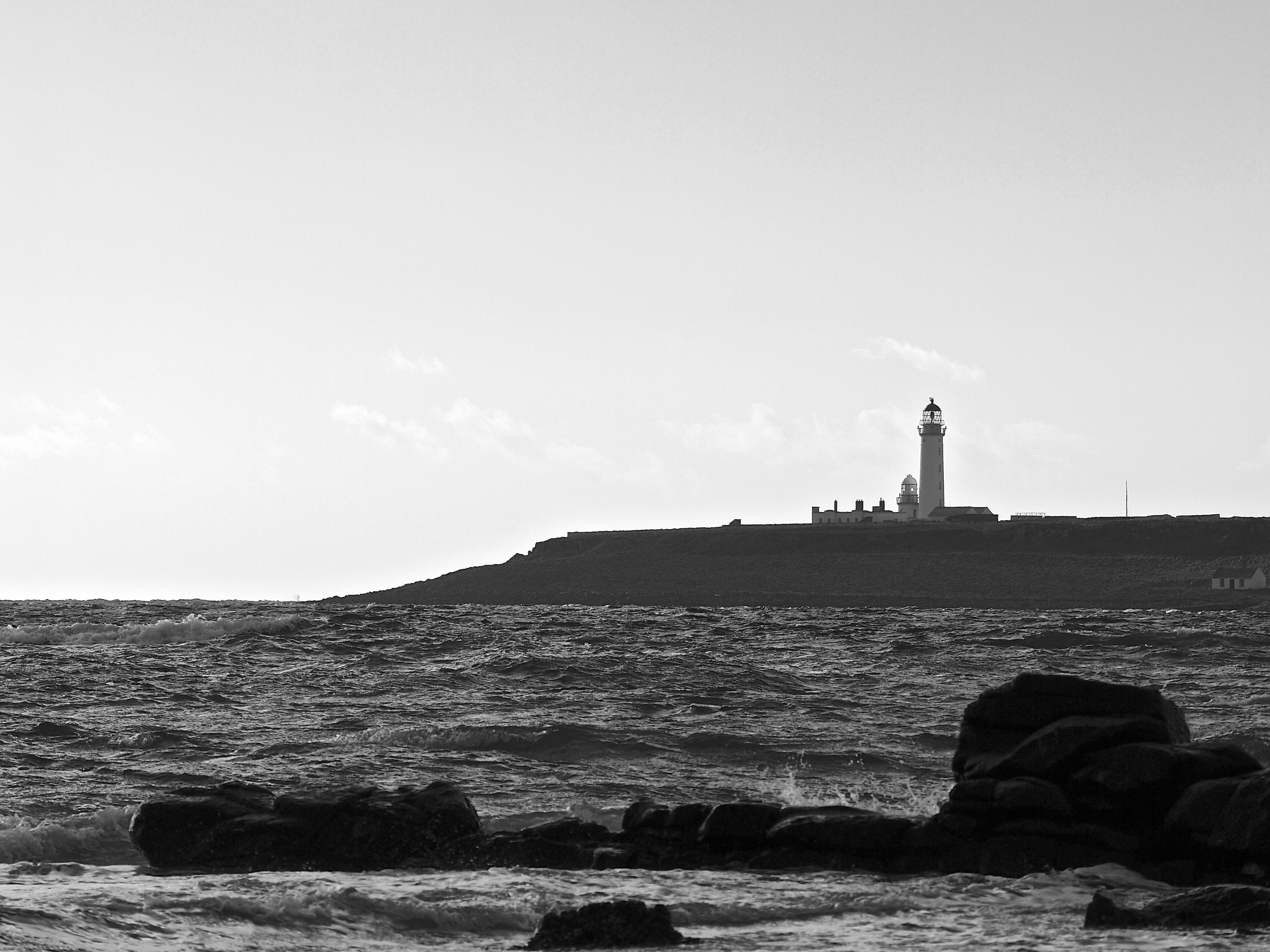
Pladda lighthouse

=== Holy Isle, Inner lighthouse ===
The Inner lighthouse on Holy Isle faces the east coast of the Isle of Arran at the south entrance of Lamlash Bay. The lighthouse was built in 1877. With automation at the beginning of the 20th century, one lightkeeper was made redundant. At the same time, an oil tank was set up on the pier at Holy Isle. The oil was then pumped to the light house by air pressure where before, oil barrels had to be landed and then rolled to the oil cellar and pumped by hand into the cisterns. In 1977, the Holy Island lighthouses were electrified, fully automated and classified as unattended at the same time. Holy Isle Inner lighthouse is 23 m high and white. In 1894, the lighthouse keepers saved the captain and crew of the "Ossian". The light Fl.G.3s14m10M and is obscured from east of 147 and north of 282.

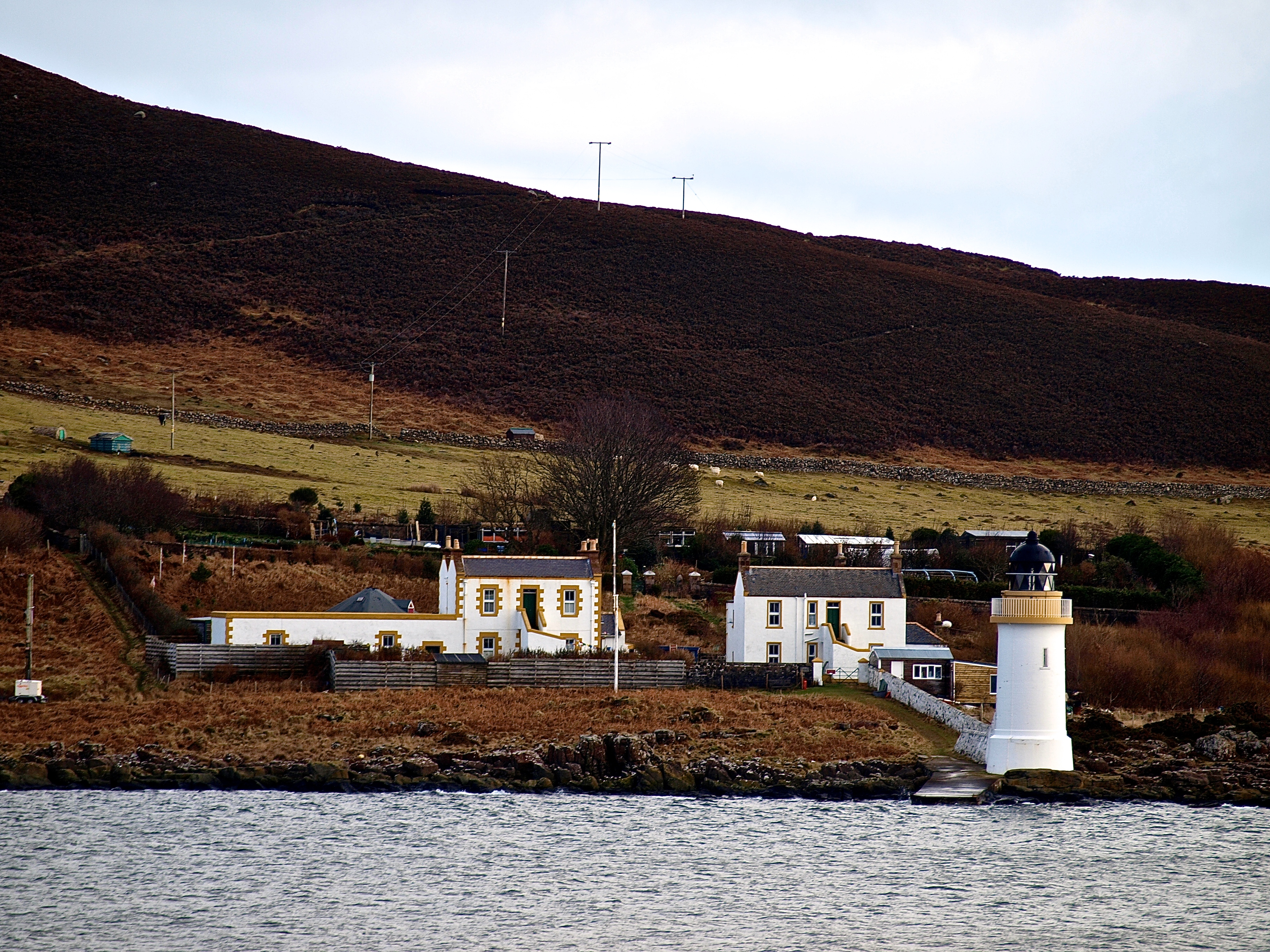
Inner lighthouse, Holy Isle

=== Holy Isle, Outer or Pillar Rock lighthouse ===
Pillar Rock lighthouse is the youngest of the three lighthouses around the Isle of Arran and was built in 1905 on the southwestern shore of Holy Isle to the east of Arran in Lamlash Bay. It was the Northern Lighthouse Board's first square lighthouse. Together with Holy Isle's Inner lighthouse, Pillar Rock was electrified in 1977 and operates fully automatic since. The light Fl(2)20s38m25M.

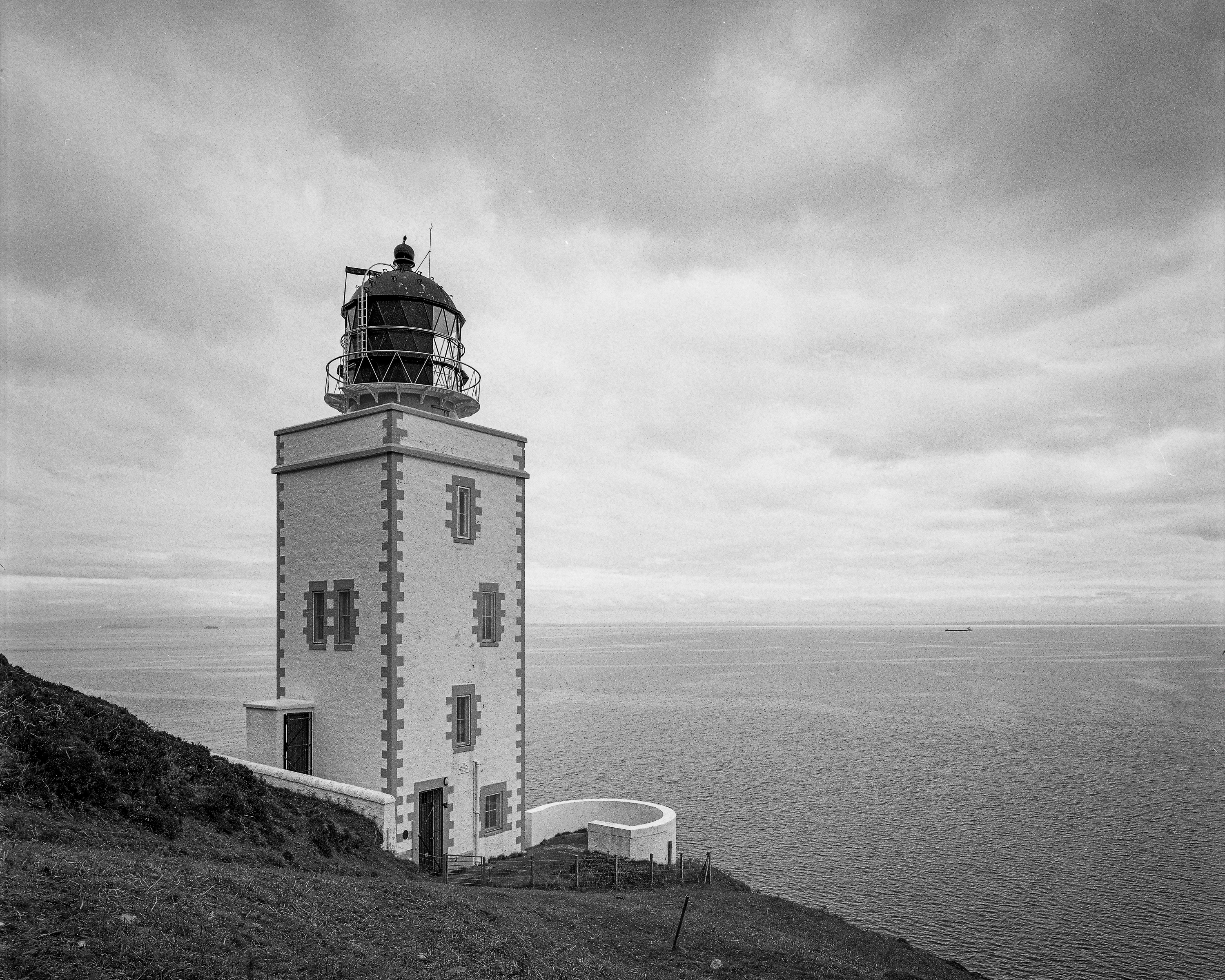
Holy Isle, Outer or Pillar Rock lighthouse, Holy Isle, Arran, Scotland

== See also ==
- List of lighthouses in Scotland
- List of Northern Lighthouse Board lighthouses
