= Campbeltown Loch =

Sea loch in Argyll and Bute, Scotland

- Ceann Loch Chille Chiarain (Scottish Gaelic)
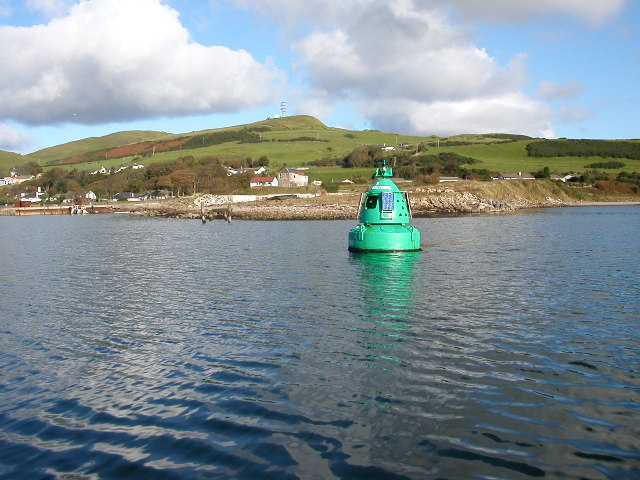
- Trench Point, Campbeltown Loch

- Location within Argyll and Bute
- Location: Kintyre peninsula, Argyll and Bute, Scotland.
- Coordinates: 55.426383°N 5.5650215°W, grid reference NR 74519 20503
- Type: Sea Loch
- Basin countries: Scotland, United Kingdom
- Surface elevation: Sea Level
- Frozen: No

Campbeltown Loch (Scottish Gaelic: Loch Chille Chiarain) is a small sea loch near the south of the Kintyre Peninsula facing eastwards towards the Firth of Clyde. The town of Campbeltown, from which it takes its name, is located at its head. The island of Davaar is located in the loch, and can be reach by foot along a natural shingle causeway at low tide. Oddly, while in English the Loch takes its name from Campbeltown, in Gaelic, Campbeltown takes its name from the loch - "Ceann Loch Chille Chiarain".

== English raid of 1558 ==
In October 1558, the English raided "Loch Kilkerran" because of the activities of the Clan MacDonald in Ireland. The Earl of Sussex sailed from Dublin in the Mary Willoughby with a small fleet. They burnt farms and houses including Saddell, a castle of James MacDonald of Dunyvaig and Glynnes (died 1565), and then marched south to burn Dunaverty and Machrimore. He then burnt farms on Arran, Bute, and Cumbrae.

== Campbeltown Shipbuilding Co ==
In 1877 Archibald MacEachern founded a shipyard at Trench Point, at the entrance to the Loch, on what had been 17th century earthworks. Campbeltown Shipbuilding Company Limited, with capital of £60,000, was formed in 1917. The yard closed in 1922, after building 115 ships. Campbeltown Shipyard Ltd, a subsidiary of Lithgows (1969) Ltd, opened on the same site in 1969 and built 101 fishing and other small boats until 1997. In 2009 a slipway, jetty and some buildings remained.

== The song ==
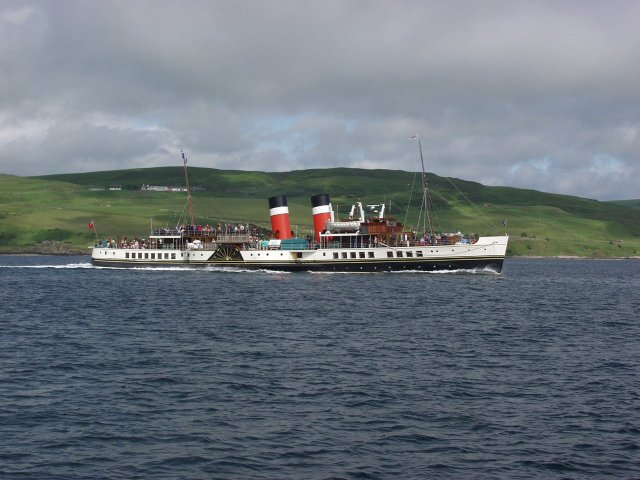
The Waverley leaving Campbeltown Loch.

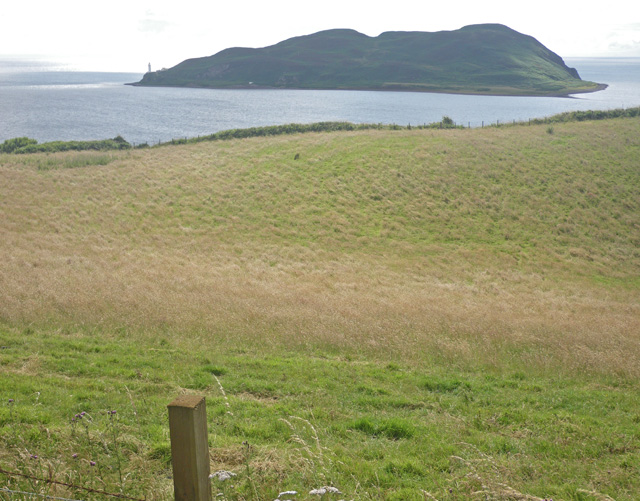
Campbeltown Loch with Davaar Island beyond and a grassy meadow in the foreground

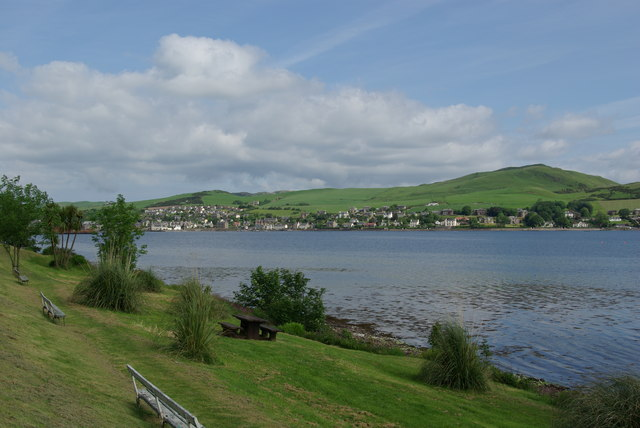
Campbeltown Loch - geograph.org.uk - 1434447

The loch is immortalised in the folk song of the same name, repopularized by Andy Stewart in the 1960s. In the song (see below) the writer Alan Cameron expresses his desire that the loch be full of whisky. The basis of that ballad is that Campbeltown was originally a centre of whisky distilling but that the price of whisky in Campbeltown itself was too high.

Chorus:
Oh! Campbeltown Loch, Ah wish ye were whisky!
Campbeltown Loch, Och Aye!
Campbeltown Loch, I wish ye were whisky!
Ah wid drink ye dry.

Now Campbeltown Loch is a beautiful place,
But the price of the whisky is grim.
How nice it would be if the whisky was free
And the Loch was filled up to the brim.

I'd buy a yacht with the money I've got
And I'd anchor it out in the bay.
If I wanted a nip I'd go in for a dip
I'd be swimmin' by night and by day.

We'd have a gathering of the clans
They'd come from near and far
I can see them grin as they're wading in
And shouting "Slàinte mhath!".

But what if the boat should overturn
And drowned in the whisky was I?
You'd hear me shout, you'd hear me call out
"What a wonderful way to die !"

But what's this I see, ochone for me
It's a vision to make your blood freeze.
It's the police afloat in a dirty great boat
And they're shouting: "Time, gentlemen, please!"

Campbeltown Loch is sung to a march written for the bagpipes, The Glendaruel Highlanders.
