= Island Davaar =

Tidal island off the east coast of Kintyre, Scotland

Eilean Dà Bhàrr (Gaelic)
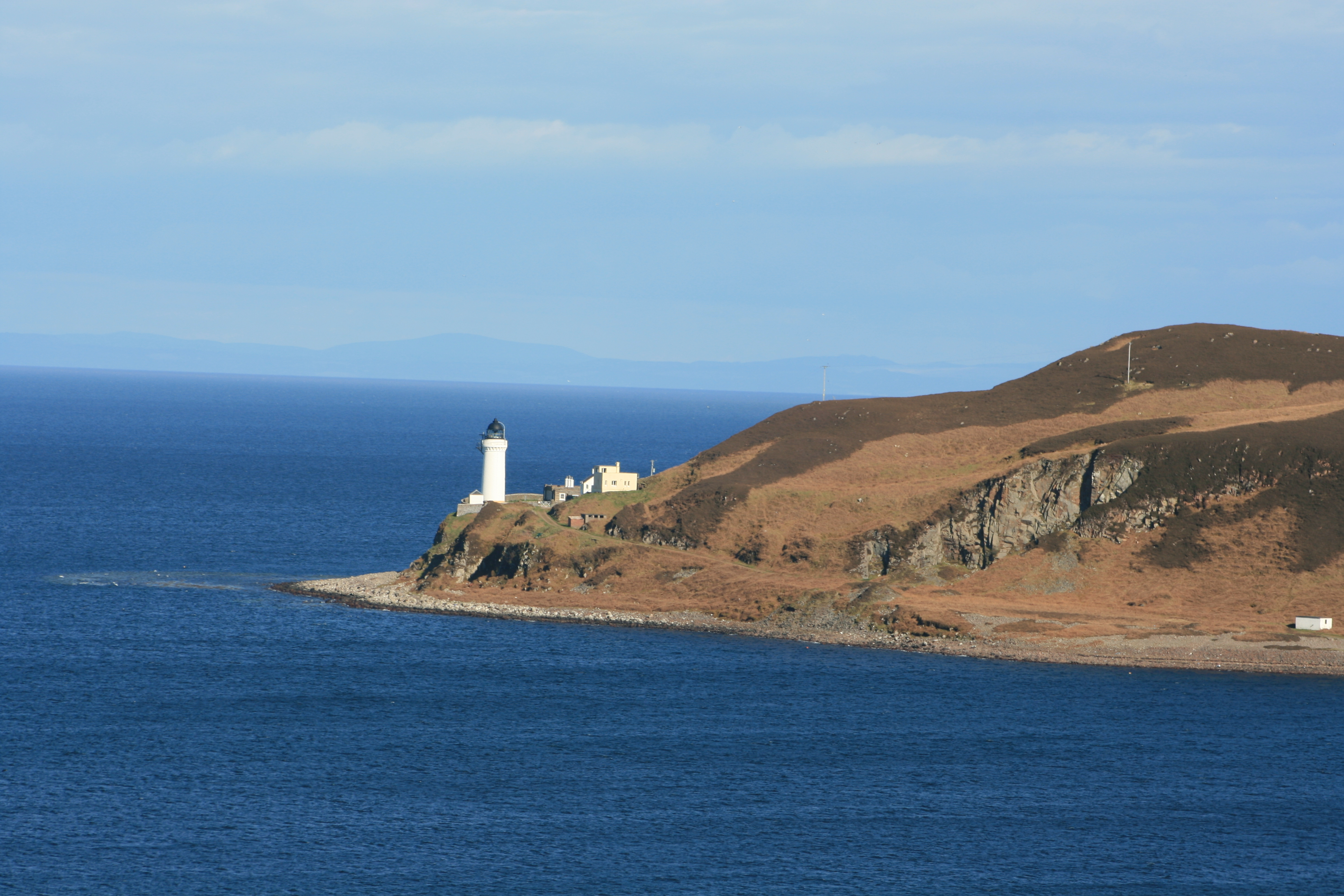
- Davaar Island and Lighthouse

Location
- Island Davaar shown within Argyll and Bute
- OS grid reference: NR760200
- Coordinates: 55.42°N 5.54°W

Name
- Name meaning: "Saint Barre's island"

Physical geography
- Island group: Firth of Clyde
- Area: 52 ha (130 acres)
- Area rank: 198
- Highest elevation: 115 m (377 ft)

Administration
- Council area: Argyll and Bute
- Country: Scotland
- Sovereign state: United Kingdom

Demographics
- Population: 0

Island Davaar or Davaar Island (Scottish Gaelic: Eilean Dà Bhàrr) is located at the mouth of Campbeltown Loch off the east coast of Kintyre Peninsula, in Argyll and Bute, west of Scotland. It is a tidal island, linked to the mainland at low tide by a natural shingle causeway called The Doirlinn. The crossing can be made in around 40 minutes.

== History ==
Davaar was known as the island of Sanct Barre between the years 1449 to 1508. The modern form Davaar is from the older Do Bharre – Gaelic for "thy St Barre". However Dr Gillies in his "Place Names of Argyll" appears to accept the popular derivation, Double-pointed (Da-Bharr) Island.

In 1854, Davaar Lighthouse was built on the island's north by the lighthouse engineers David and Thomas Stevenson. The lighthouse was automated in 1983, and today Davaar is inhabited by the caretakers of the island who run the holiday cottages and oversee the farming activities including rare breed sheep and Highland cattle. The island is also home to feral goats.

The Lookout, a square building standing on a small knoll close to the lighthouse, was built during World War II as one of the Royal Observer Corps' (ROC's) four Kintyre observation posts. While the men and women of the ROC watched for enemy activity around the loch, the anti-submarine net (positioned between Davaar and Trench Point) was maintained by the Wrens, officers, and ratings stationed in the Boom Defence Depot on the opposite shore. Davaar's observation post has been restored and tastefully converted into a unique place to stay.

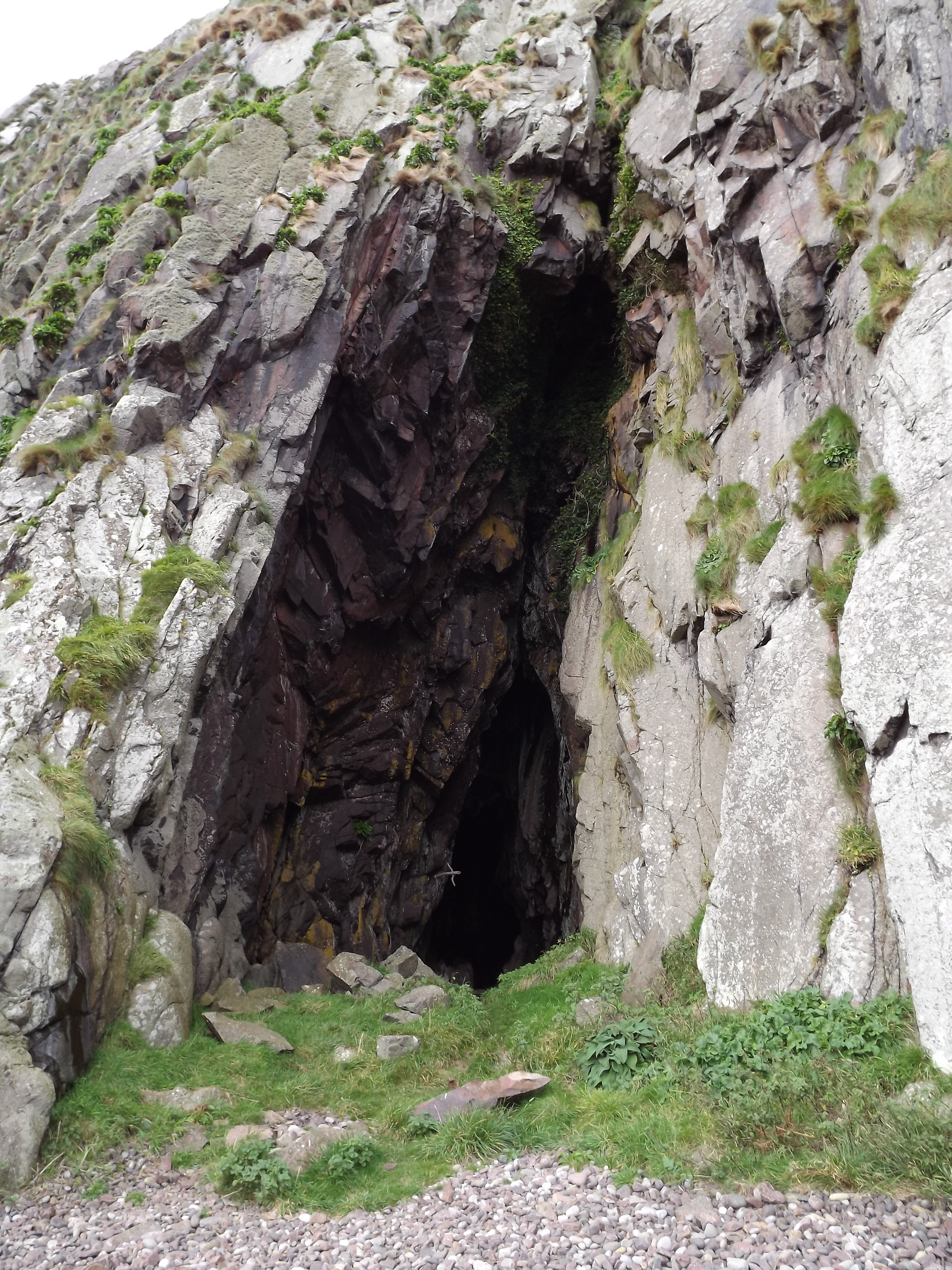
Entrance to the cave containing Archibald MacKinnon's painting

The island is also known for its seven caves, one of which contains a life-size cave painting depicting the Crucifixion, painted in 1887 by local artist Archibald MacKinnon after he had a vision in a dream suggesting that he do so. The painting caused uproar in the area as it was seen as a sign from God; it is said that when the townsfolk discovered it was MacKinnon, and not God, he was exiled from the town indefinitely. Restored several times since, including twice by the original artist, the painting was vandalised in July 2006, having a red and black depiction of Che Guevara painted over the original masterpiece. It has since been restored again.

Davaar Island is one of 43 tidal islands that can be walked to from the mainland of Great Britain and one of 17 that can be walked to from the Scottish mainland.

Davaar Island is owned by Kildalloig Estate, and forms part of the farming enterprise.

== Staying on Davaar Island ==
There are four holiday cottages and cabins available for visitors to stay on Davaar Island. The Lookout (WWII Observation Post) and The Principal Lighthouse Keeper's Cottage have been converted into holiday cottages, and in 2021 two glamping cabins were constructed on the east side of Davaar.

== Stamps ==
Local stamps were issued for Davaar in 1964. The stamps served the many visitors to the island who wished to have their mail posted there; the boatman carried the mail to the nearest GPO post box at Campbeltown on the mainland. The boatman service ended some time in the 2000s. Postage rates were double those of the UK.

== See also ==
- List of lighthouses in Scotland
- List of Northern Lighthouse Board lighthouses
