= List of islands by name (E) =

This article features a list of islands sorted by their name beginning with the letter E.

== E ==
Island's Name	Island group(s)	Country/Countries
E	Charles River, Massachusetts	United States
Eagle	Disambiguation	
Eagle	Washington	United States
Eagle	Apostle Islands, Wisconsin	United States
Eagle Nest	Alabama	United States
Earnheart	Arkansas	United States
Easdale	Slate Islands	Scotland
East Brother	The Brothers, Hong Kong	China
East Brother	Islands of San Francisco Bay, California	United States
East Caicos	Bahamas, Turks and Caicos Islands	United Kingdom
East Cay	Leeward Islands in the Lesser Antilles, Anguilla	United Kingdom
East Cay	Leeward Islands in the Lesser Antilles	Saint Kitts and Nevis
East Cay	Bahamas, Turks and Caicos Islands	United Kingdom
East Falkland	Falkland Islands	United Kingdom
East Hardwood	Lake Nipissing, Ontario	Canada
East	Western Australia	Australia
East	Western Australia	Australia
East		Australia
East		New Zealand
East	Rhode Island	United States
East Linga	Shetland Islands	Scotland
East Okak	Newfoundland and Labrador	Canada
East Seal Dog	British Virgin Islands	United Kingdom
East Sister	Lake Erie, Ontario	Canada
East Redonda	Strait of Georgia, British Columbia	Canada
East Rous	North Channel, Ontario	Canada
East Ship	Mississippi	United States
East Timbalier	Timbalier Bay,Louisiana	United States
Easter (Easter Island)	called Rapa Nui in Rapa Nui	Chile
Eastern	North Channel, Ontario	Canada
Ilet A Eau	Lesser Antilles, Martinique	France
Ebeye	Ralik Chain	Marshall Islands
Ebon Atoll	Ralik Chain	Marshall Islands
Echo	Georgian Bay, Ontario	Canada
Eclipse	Great Palm Island group, Queensland	Australia
Eday	Orkney Islands	Scotland
Eden	Arkansas	United States
Egdell	Nunavut	Canada
Edgeøya	Svalbard	Norway
Estido	South Carolina	United States
Edith Hammock	Alabama	United States
Éfaté	Pacific Ocean	Vanuatu
Egg Island	Great Salt Lake	United States
Egg	Bahamas	Bahamas
Egg	North Channel, Ontario	Canada
Egholm	Limfjord	Denmark
Egilsay	The North Isles, Orkney Islands	Scotland
Eglington	Queen Elizabeth Islands, Northwest Territories	Canada
Eigg	Inner Hebrides	Scotland
Eighteen Mile	French River, Ontario	Canada
Eightmile	West Virginia	United States
Eilean Buidhe	Burnt Islands	Scotland
Eilean Dubh	Kyles of Bute	Scotland
Eilean Dubh	Summer Isles	Scotland
Eilean Dubh	Sound of Jura	Scotland
Eilean Dubh	Loch Craignish	Scotland
Eilean Dubh	Balnakeil Bay	Scotland
Eilean Dubh	Loch Shiel	Scotland
Eilean Dubh a' Chumhainn Mhòir	Loch Tarbert	Scotland
Eilean Dubh Mòr	Inner Hebrides	Scotland
Eilean Dearg	Islands of the Clyde	Scotland
Eilean Fraoich	Burnt Islands	Scotland
Eilean Gowan	Lake Muskoka, Ontario	Canada
Eilean Mòr	Burnt Islands	Scotland
Ekerö och Munsö		Sweden
Ekinlik	Sea of Marmara	Turkey
El Hierro	Canary Islands	Spain
Elafonissos		Greece
Elba	Tuscan Archipelago	Italy
Elbow Cay	Bahamas	Bahamas
Elephant	Jason Islands of the Falkland Islands	British Overseas Territory of the United Kingdom
Elephant	South Shetland Islands	Claimed by Argentine Antarctica, Argentina, Antártica Chilena Province of Chile, and British Antarctic Territory of the United Kingdom
Elephanta	Maharashtra	India
Eleuthera	Bahamas	Bahamas
Eliot	Alabama	United States
Eliza	San Juan Islands, Washington	United States
Elizabeth	Bahamas	Bahamas
Elizabeth	Bermuda	United Kingdom
Elizabeth	Georgian Bay (Parry Sound), Ontario	Canada
Elizabeth	Lake Superior, Michigan	United States
Elizabeth	Western Port Bay, Victoria	Australia
Elk	Wyoming	United States
Ellef Ringnes	Sverdrup Islands, Nunavut	Canada
Ellesmere	Nunavut	Canada
Ellis	New York Harbor,New York	United States
Elm	Maryland/Virginia	United States
Elm	North Channel, Ontario	Canada
Elm	Montgomery County, Maryland near Blockhouse Point	United States
Elmtree	Georgian Bay, Ontario	Canada
Eloaua	St. Matthias Islands	Papua New Guinea
Elobey Grande	Río Muni	Equatorial Guinea
Elobey Chico	Río Muni	Equatorial Guinea
Eluvai Theevu		Sri Lanka
Émaé	Shepherd Islands	Vanuatu
Émao	Shepherd Islands	Vanuatu
Emerald	Greater Antilles	Jamaica
Emerald	Queen Elizabeth Islands, Northwest Territories	Canada
Emerald	Buckhorn Lake, Ontario	Canada
Emirau	St. Matthias Islands	Papua New Guinea
Enchanted	Mississippi River, Iowa	United States
Endelave	Kattegat	Denmark
Endicott	Beaufort Sea, Alaska	United States
Endymion	St. Lawrence River, Ontario	Canada
Enewetak	Ralik chain	Marshall Islands
Cayo Enrique	Greater Antilles, Puerto Rico	United States
Enterprise Island	Mississippi River, Illinois	United States
Epi	Pacific Ocean	Vanuatu
Epsilon	Bermuda	United Kingdom
Ereikoussa		Greece
Erikub Atoll	Ralik Chain	Marshall Islands
Isla del Erio	Greater Antilles, Puerto Rico	United States
Ermal	Minho Islands	Portugal
Erraid	Inner Hebrides	Scotland
Erromango	Pacific Ocean	Vanuatu
Ertholmene	also known as Christiansø	Denmark
Ertvågøy		Norway
Erwa	Dahlak Archipelago	Eritrea
Esk	Great Palm Island group, Queensland	Australia
Isla del Espiritu Santo	Baja California Sur	Mexico
Espiritu Santo	Pacific Ocean	Vanuatu
Cayo Esquivel	Greater Antilles	Cuba
Esslinger	Alabama	United States
Estrada	Beira Baixa Islands	Portugal
Eta	Bermuda	United Kingdom
Etolin	Alexander Archipelago, Alaska	United States
Euboea	Greek archipelago	Greece
Eustatia	British Virgin Islands	United Kingdom
Eureka	Ohio River, West Virginia	United States
Evans	Prince William Sound, Alaska	United States
Evans	Nevada	United States
Evelyn	Western Australia	Australia
Evelyn	Lake Huron, Ontario	Canada
Evergreen	Lake Winnipesaukee, New Hampshire	United States
Exchange	Leeward Islands in the Lesser Antilles	Antigua and Barbuda
Exuma	Bahamas	Bahamas
Eynhallow	The North Isles, Orkney Islands	Scotland
Eysturoy	Faroe Islands	Denmark

== See also ==
- List of islands (by country)
- List of islands by area
- List of islands by population
- List of islands by highest point
