= Islands of the Clyde =

Scottish island group

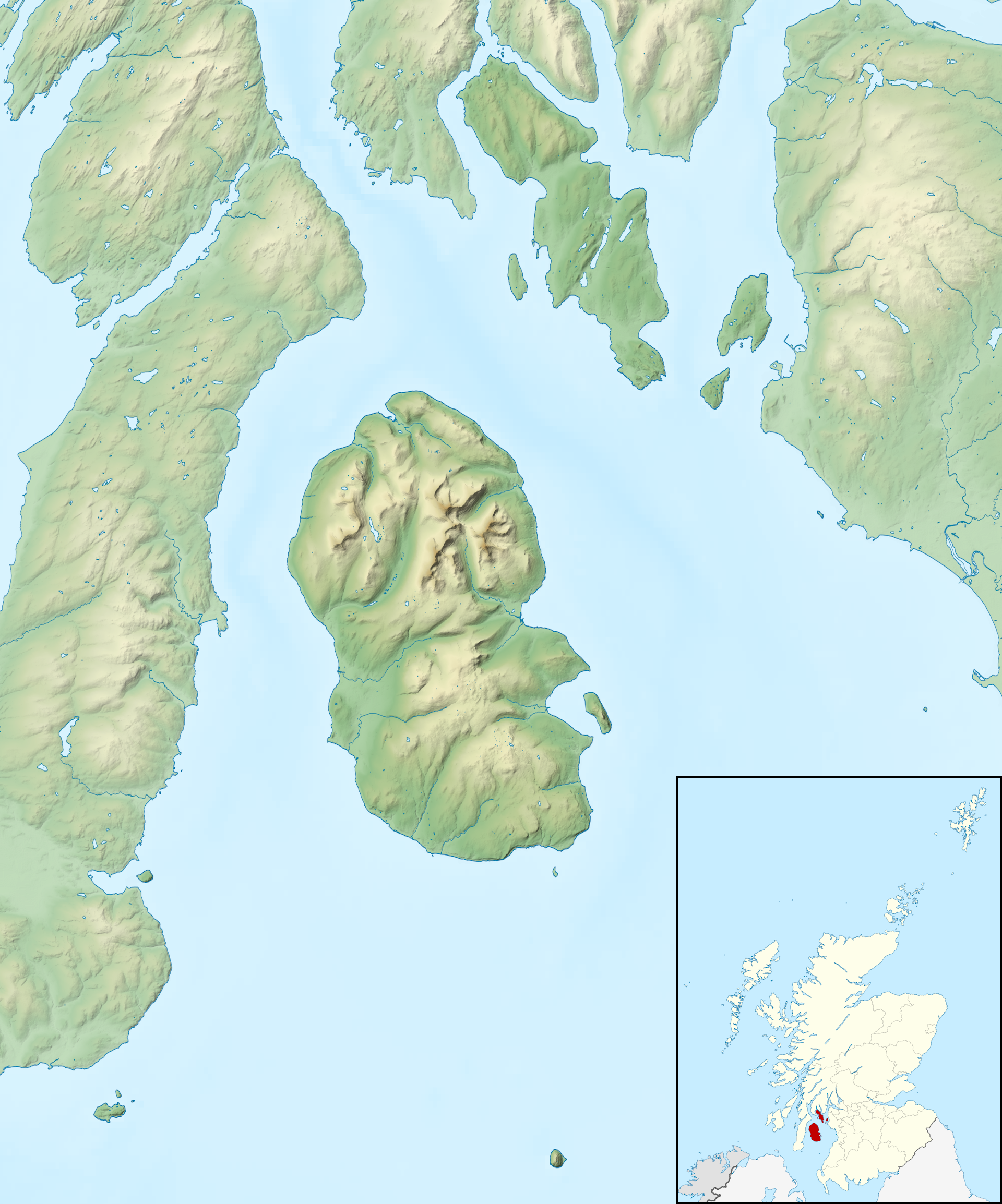
The islands within the Firth of Clyde

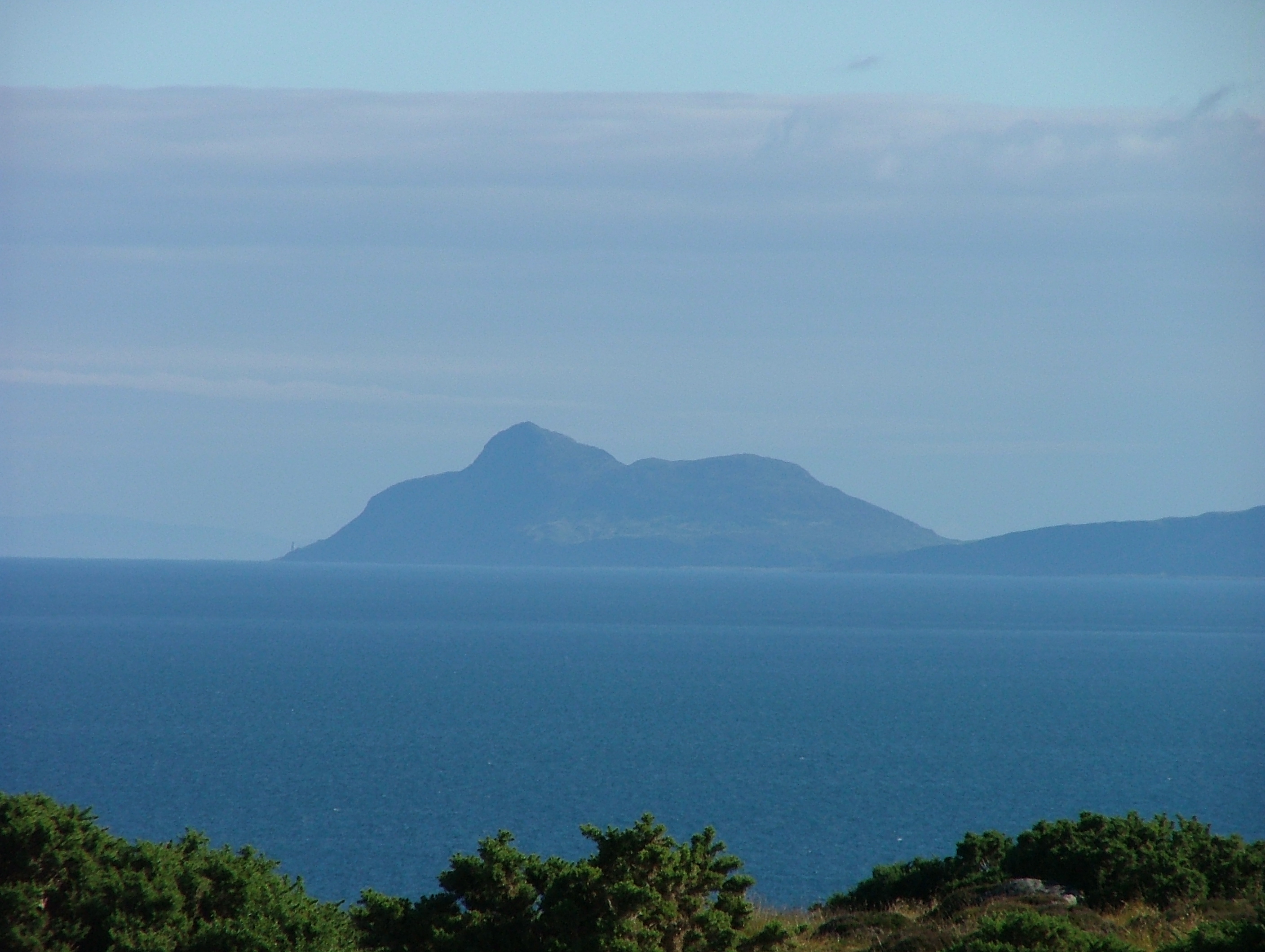
Holy Isle seen from Bute

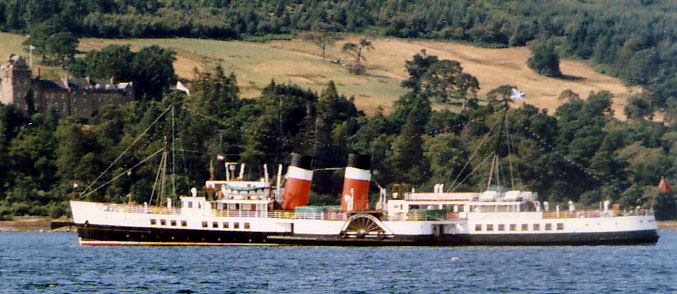
The PS Waverley lying in Brodick Bay in front of Brodick Castle. Paddle steamers like this were formerly extremely common on the Clyde.

The Islands of the Firth of Clyde are the fifth largest of the major Scottish island groups after the Inner and Outer Hebrides, Orkney and Shetland. They are situated in the Firth of Clyde between Argyll and Bute in the west and Inverclyde, North Ayrshire and South Ayrshire in the east. There are about forty islands and skerries. Only four are inhabited, and only nine are larger than 40 hectares (99 acres). (Note: The definition of an island used is that it is land that is surrounded by seawater on a daily basis, but not necessarily at all stages of the tide, excluding human devices such as bridges and causeways. Various other definitions are used in the Scottish context. For example, the General Register Office for Scotland define an island as "a mass of land surrounded by water, separate from the Scottish mainland" but although they include islands linked by bridges etc., this is not clear from this definition. Haswell-Smith (2004) uses "an Island is a piece of land or group of pieces of land which is entirely surrounded by water at Lowest Astronomical Tide and to which there is no permanent means of dry access". This consciously excludes bridged islands, which most other sources include.) The largest and most populous are Arran and Bute. They are served by dedicated ferry routes, as are Great Cumbrae and Holy Island. Unlike the isles in the four larger Scottish archipelagos, none of the isles in this group are connected to one another or to the mainland by bridges.

The geology and geomorphology of the area is complex, and the islands and the surrounding sea lochs each have distinctive features. The influence of the Atlantic Ocean and the North Atlantic Drift create a mild, damp oceanic climate. There is a diversity of wildlife, including three species of rare endemic trees.

The larger islands have been continuously inhabited since Neolithic times. The cultures of their inhabitants were influenced by the emergence of the kingdom of Dál Riata, beginning in 500 AD. The islands were then politically absorbed into the emerging kingdom of Alba, led by Kenneth MacAlpin. During the early Middle Ages, the islands experienced Viking incursions. In the 13th century, they became part of the Kingdom of Scotland.

== Geology and geography ==
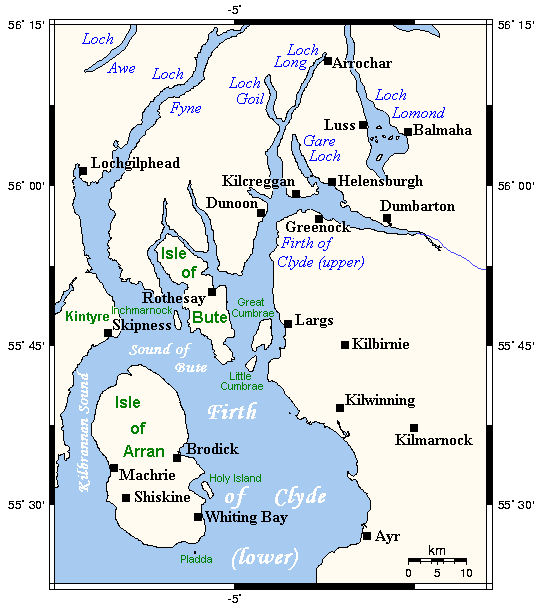
The Firth of Clyde

The Highland Boundary Fault runs past Bute and through the northern part of Arran. Therefore, from a geological perspective, some of the islands are in the Highlands and some in the Central Lowlands. As a result of Arran's geological similarity to Scotland, it is sometimes referred to as "Scotland in miniature"; and, the island is a popular destination for geologists. They come to Arran to study its intrusive igneous landforms, such as sills and dykes, as well as its sedimentary and metasedimentary rocks, which range widely in age. Visiting in 1787, the geologist James Hutton found his first example of an unconformity there. The spot where he discovered it is one of the most famous places in the history of the study of geology. The group of weakly metamorphosed rocks that form the Highland Border Complex lie discontinuously along the Highland Boundary Fault. One of the most prominent exposures is along Loch Fad on Bute. Ailsa Craig, which lies some 25 kilometres (16 mi) south of Arran, has been quarried for a rare type of micro-granite containing riebeckite, known as "Ailsite". It is used by Kays of Scotland to make curling stones. As recently as 2004, 60 to 70% of all curling stones in use globally were made from granite quarried on the island. As of the February 2026 Winter Olympics, it was stated in their News pages that every Olympic Curling Stone comes from Ailsa Craig.

Like the rest of Scotland, the Firth of Clyde was covered by ice sheets during the Pleistocene ice ages, and the landscape has been much affected by glaciation. Back then, Arran's highest peaks may have been nunataks. Sea-level changes and the isostatic rise of land after the last retreat of the ice created clifflines behind raised beaches, which are a prominent feature of the entire coastline. The action of these forces has made charting the post glacial coastlines a complex task.

The various soil types on the islands reflect their diverse geology. Bute has the most productive land, and it has a pattern of deposits that is typical of the southwest of Scotland. In the eroded valleys, there is a mixture of boulder clay and other glacial deposits. Elsewhere, especially to the south and west, there are raised beach- and marine deposits, which in some places, such as Stravanan, result in a machair landscape inland from the sandy bays.

The Firth of Clyde, in which these islands lie, is north of the Irish Sea and has numerous branching inlets. Some of those inlets, including Loch Goil, Loch Long, Gare Loch, Loch Fyne, and the estuary of the River Clyde, have their own substantial features. In places, the effect of glaciation on the seabed is pronounced. For example, the Firth is 320 metres (1,050 ft) deep between Arran and Bute, even though they are only 8 kilometres (5.0 mi) apart. The islands all stand exposed to wind and tide. Various lighthouses, such as those on Ailsa Craig, Pladda, and Davaar, act as an aid to navigation.

== Climate ==
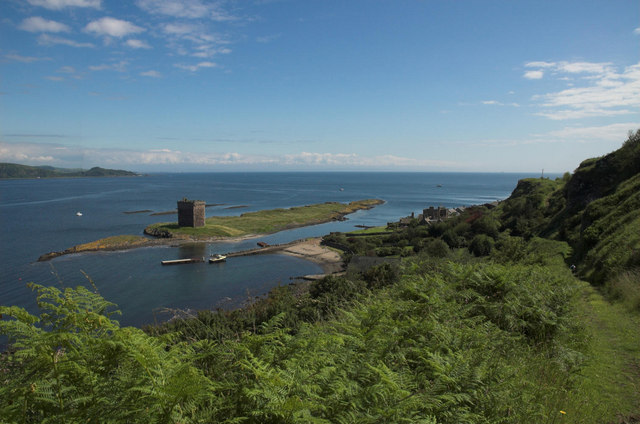
Castle Island from Little Cumbrae

The Firth of Clyde lies between 55 and 56 degrees north latitude. This is the same latitude as Labrador in Canada and north of the Aleutian Islands. However, the influence of the North Atlantic Drift—the northern extension of the Gulf Stream—moderates the winter weather. As a result, the area enjoys a mild, damp oceanic climate. Temperatures are generally cool, averaging about 6 °C (43 °F) in January and 14 °C (57 °F) in July at sea level. Snow seldom lies at sea level, and frosts are generally less frequent than they are on the mainland. In common with most islands off the west coast of Scotland, the average annual rainfall is generally high: between 1,300 mm (51 in) on Bute, in the Cumbraes, and in the south of Arran, and 1,900 mm (75 in) in the north of Arran. The Arran mountains are even wetter: Their summits receive over 2,550 mm (100 in) of rain annually. May, June and July are the sunniest months: on average, there is a total of 200 hours of bright sunshine during that 3-month period each year. Southern Bute benefits from a particularly large number of sunny days.

== History ==
=== Prehistory ===
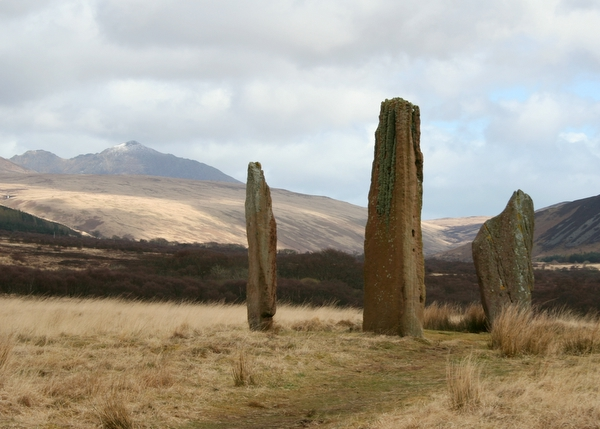
Machrie Moor standing stones, Arran

Mesolithic humans arrived in the area of the Firth of Clyde during the 4th millennium BC, probably from Ireland. This initial arrival was followed by another wave of Neolithic peoples using the same route. In fact, there is some evidence that the Firth of Clyde was a significant route through which mainland Scotland was colonised during the Neolithic period. The inhabitants of Argyll, the Clyde estuary, and elsewhere in western Scotland at that time developed a distinctive style of megalithic structure that is known today as the Clyde cairns. About 100 of these structures have been found. They were used for interment of the dead. They are rectangular or trapezoidal, with a small enclosing chamber into which the person's body was placed. They are faced with large slabs of stone set on end (sometimes subdivided into smaller compartments). They also feature a forecourt area, which may have been used for displays or rituals associated with interment. They are mostly found in Arran, Bute, and Kintyre. It is thought likely that the Clyde cairns were the earliest forms of Neolithic monument constructed by incoming settlers. However, only a few of the cairns have been radiocarbon dated. A cairn at Monamore on Arran has been dated to 3160 BC, although other evidence suggests that it was almost certainly built earlier than that, possibly around 4000 BC. The area also features numerous standing stones dating from prehistoric times, including six stone circles on Machrie Moor in Arran, and other examples on Great Cumbrae and Bute.

Later, Bronze Age settlers also constructed megaliths at various sites. Many of them date from the 2nd millennium BC. However, instead of chambered cairns, these peoples constructed burial cists, which can be found, for example, on Inchmarnock. Evidence of settlement during this period, especially the early part of it, is scant. However, one notable artifact has been found on Bute that dates from around 2000 BC. Known today as the “Queen of the Inch necklace,” it is an article of jewellery made of lignite (commonly called “Jet.

During the early Iron Age, the Brythonic culture held sway. There is no evidence that the Roman occupation of southern Scotland extended into these islands.

=== Early Scots rule ===
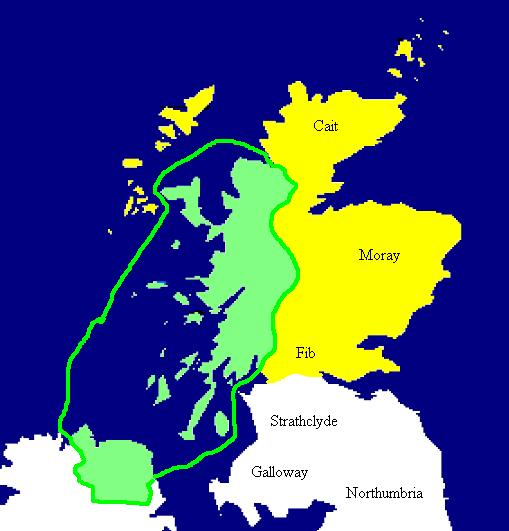
Map of Dál Riata at its height, c. 580–600. Pictish regions are marked in yellow

Beginning in the 2nd century AD, Irish influence was at work in the region, and by the 6th century, Gaels had established the kingdom of Dál Riata there. Unlike earlier inhabitants, such as the P-Celtic speaking Brythons, these Gaels spoke a form of Gaelic (a modern version of which is still spoken today in the Hebrides). During this period, through the efforts of Saint Ninian and others, Christianity slowly supplanted Druidism. The kingdom of Dál Riata flourished from the rule of Fergus Mór in the late 5th century until the Viking incursions beginning in the late 8th century.

Dál Riata was to later lose the isle of Arran to the Vikings, but it would be re-captured by Somerled in 1156.

=== Viking influence ===
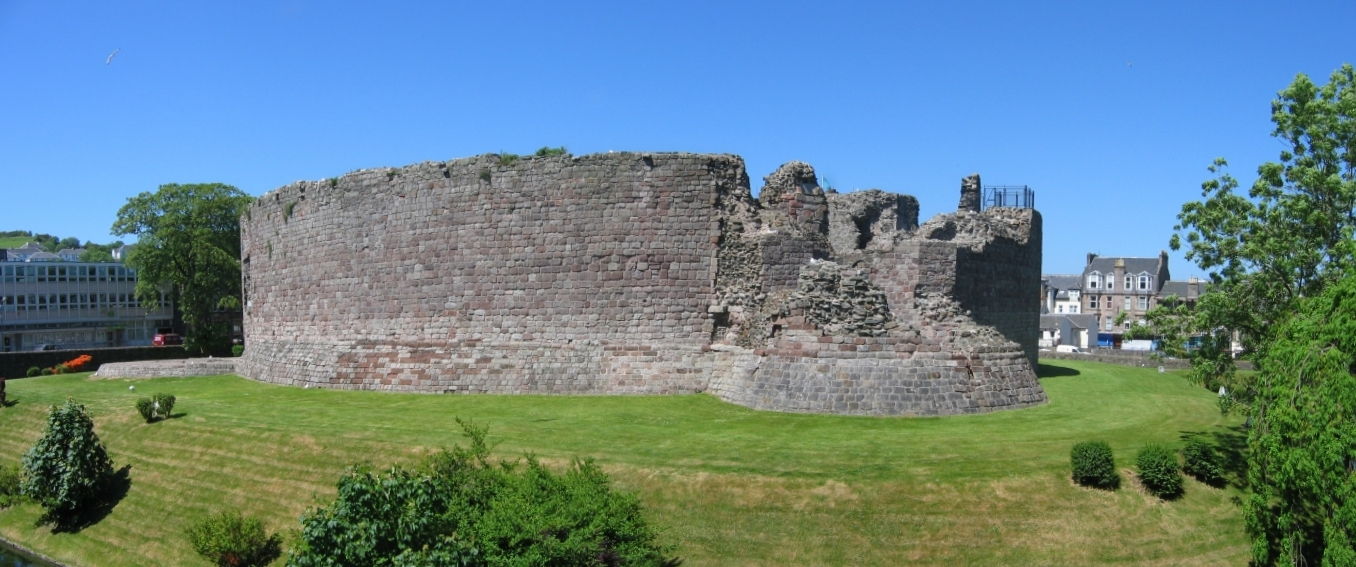
The 13th century curtain wall of Rothesay Castle, Bute

Beginning in the 9th century and into the 13th century, the Islands of the Clyde constituted a border zone between the Norse Suðreyjar and Scotland, and many of them were under Norse hegemony. (Note: The Vikings were a seafaring nation, so the Irish Sea would provide their route of entry to the Islands of the Clyde. To sail to them would be a minor deviation on the long journey between Scandinavia the Isle of Man, or Ireland.)

Beginning in the last half of the 12th century, and then into the early 1200s, the islands may well have served as the power base of Somhairle mac Giolla Brighde and his descendants. During this time, the islands seem to have come under the sway of the Steward of Scotland’s authority and to have been taken over by the expanding Stewart lordship.

This western extension of Scottish authority appears to have been one of the factors motivating the Norwegian invasion of the region in 1230, during which the invaders seized Rothesay Castle. In 1263, Norwegian troops commanded by Haakon Haakonarson repeated the feat, but the ensuing Battle of Largs between Scots and Norwegian forces, which took place on the shores of the Firth of Clyde, was inconclusive as a military contest.

This battle marked an ultimately fatal weakening of Norwegian power in Scotland. Haakon retreated to Orkney, where he died in December 1263, consoled on his death bed by recitations of the old sagas. Following his death, under the 1266 Treaty of Perth, all rights that the Norwegian Crown "had of old therein" in relation to the Hebrides were yielded to the Kingdom of Scotland.

=== Modern Scotland ===
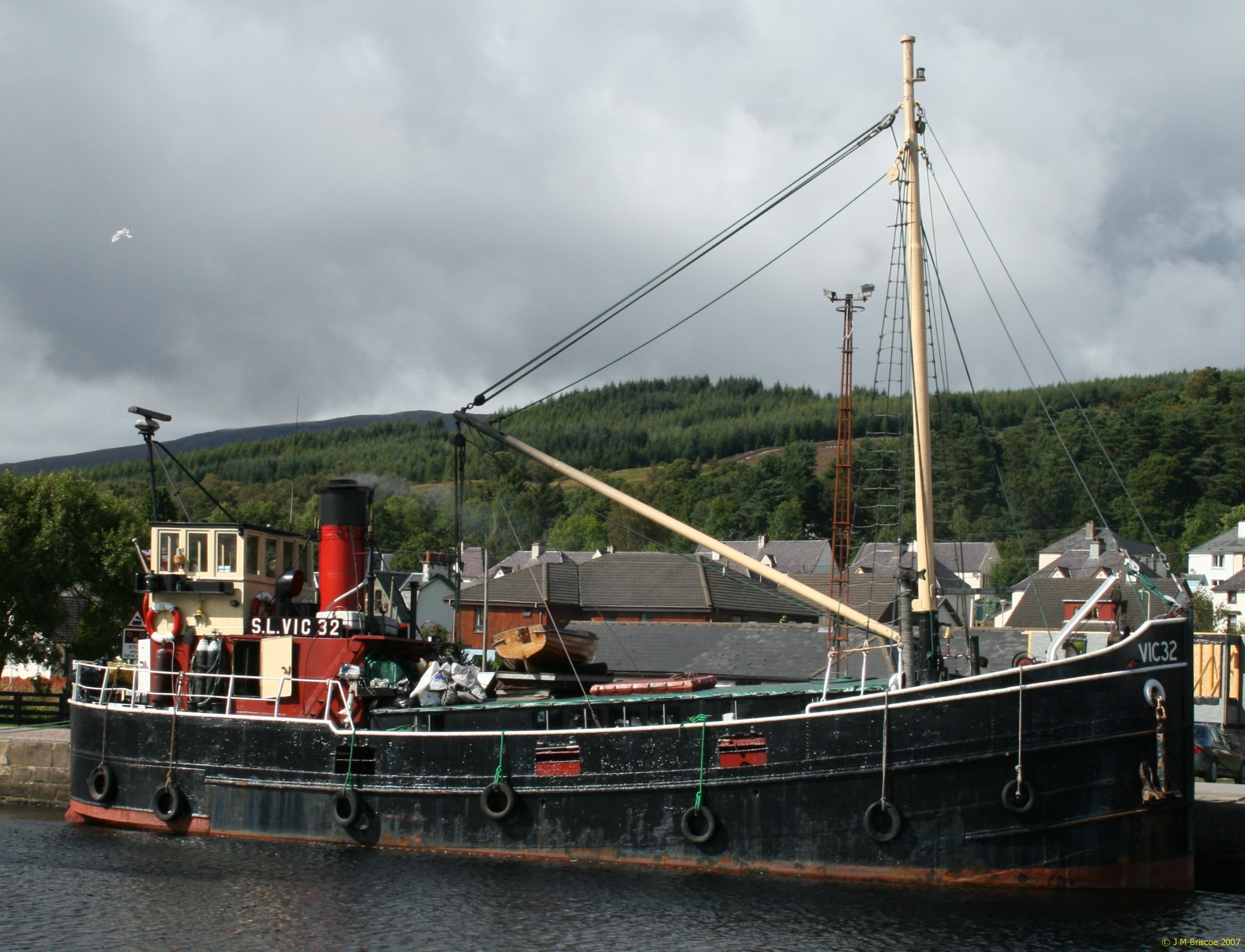
Steam Lighter VIC32, the last seagoing coal fired steam Clyde Puffer

Politically, after the Battle of Largs in October 1263, Haakon's subsequent withdrawal to Orkney, and his death there near the end of 1263, all of the islands of the Clyde became part of Scotland.

Ecclesiastically, beginning in the early medieval period, all of these isles were part of the Diocese of Sodor and Man, based at Peel, on the Isle of Man. After 1387, the seat of the Bishopric of the Isles was relocated to the north, first to Snizort on Skye and then to Iona. This arrangement continued until the Scottish Reformation in the 16th century, when Scotland broke with the Catholic Church. (Note: The Church of Scotland is the National church of Scotland. It is presbyterian, so it has no Diocese or Bishoprics. The Scottish Episcopal Church, in contrast, does have a system of Dioceses and the Isle of Arran comes within the Diocese of Argyll and The Isles (Episcopal).)

The mid-1700s marked the beginning of a century of significant change. New forms of transport, industry, and agriculture brought an end to ways of life that had endured for centuries. The Battle of Culloden in 1746 foreshadowed the end of the clan system. These changes improved living standards for some, but came at a cost for others.

In the late 18th and early 19th centuries, Alexander, the 10th Duke of Hamilton (1767–1852), and others implemented a controversial agricultural-reform programme called the Highland Clearances that had a devastating effect on many of Arran's inhabitants. Whole villages were emptied, and the Gaelic culture of the island was dealt a terminal blow. (A memorial to the tenant farmers evicted from the island by this programme was later erected on the shore at Lamlash, funded by a Canadian descendant of some of those evicted.)

From the 1850s to the late 20th century, cargo ships known as “Clyde Puffers” (made famous by an early-20th-century story collection called the Vital Spark), were the workhorses of the islands, carrying a great deal of produce and a great variety of products to and from the islands. In May 1889, the Caledonian Steam Packet Company (CSP) was founded and began operating steamer services to and from Gourock for the Caledonian Railway. The company soon expanded by taking over rival steamer operators. David MacBrayne operated the Glasgow-to-Ardrishaig steamer service, as part of the so-called "Royal Route" to Oban. During the 20th century, many of the islands were developed as tourist resorts along the lines of mainland resorts such as Largs and Troon, but catering for Glaswegians who preferred to holiday "Doon the Watter".

In 1973, CSP and MacBraynes combined their Clyde and West Highland operations under the new name of Caledonian MacBrayne. A government-owned corporation, they serve Great Cumbrae, Arran, and Bute, and also run mainland-to-mainland ferries across the firth. Private companies operate services from Arran to Holy Isle, and from McInroy's Point (Gourock) to Hunter's Quay on the Cowal peninsula.

From 1890 to 1975, the traditional County of Bute, consisted of the four main Islands of the Clyde: Bute, Arran, Great and Little Cumbraes, plus Holy Isle, Pladda and Inchmarnock; and its inhabitants were represented by the county council of Bute. The 1973 reorganisation Act, implemented as the 1975 Local Government reorganization, abolished both Scotland's traditional counties and local councils. It divided Scotland into Regions; and, within them, Districts. From 1975, the Islands of the Clyde all came within the Region of Strathclyde, but spread between several Districts. Then in 1996, the Local Government etc. (Scotland) Act 1994 abolished the two-tier system of Regions and Districts in Scotland, so Strathclyde and the other regions were abolished. Since then, the islands of the Clyde have been split more or less equally between two modern council authorities: Argyll and Bute, and North Ayrshire. The two now un-inhabited isles Ailsa Craig and Lady Isle, however, lie in the modern council authority of South Ayrshire. (Note: The County of Argyll and County of Bute were separate Scottish counties prior to the 1975 Reorganisation. The present Argyll and Bute unitary authority contains the former county of Argyll and parts of the former county of Bute.) (Note: As a result of the 1975 and 1994 Acts, the traditional Scottish County of Ayr was split into two. The modern council area of South Ayrshire now covers the area of the former county town of Ayr; while North Ayrshire council covers the rest of the former County of Ayr and the islands of Arran and The Cumbraes, which were previously in the County of Bute.) (Note: The now uninhabited Lady Isle, which once contained a chapel, is in the parish of Dundonald, South Ayrshire.)

== Islands ==
Below is a table listing the nine islands of the Firth of Clyde that have an area greater than 40 hectares (approximately 100 acres), showing their population and listing the smaller uninhabited islets adjacent to them (including tidal islets separated only when the tide is higher, and skerries exposed only when the tide is lower).

As of 2001, six of the islands were inhabited, but that included one with only two residents (Davaar), and one with only one resident (Sanda). At the 2011 census, there was no one usually resident on either of these islands.

Island	Gaelic Name	Location	Area (ha)	Population	Last inhabited	Highest point	Height (m) (Note: Note that the Ordnance Survey maps mark the height above sea level of a high point on most islands, but in a small number of cases, this may not be the highest point.)	Surrounding islets
Ailsa Craig	Creag Ealasaid	South Ayrshire	99	0	1990	The Cairn	338	None
Arran	Arainn	Arran	43201	4618	–	Goat Fell	874	Eilean na h-Àirde Bàine, Hamilton Isle, Pladda
Bute	Bòid	Bute	12217	6047	–	Windy Hill	278	The Burnt Islands: Eilean Mòr, Eilean Fraoich and Eilean Buidhe, Eilean Dearg, Eilean Dubh, Sgat Beag and Sgat Mòr
Davaar	Eilean Dà Bhàrr	Kintyre	52	0	Early 2000s		115	None
Great Cumbrae	Cumaradh Mòr	Bute	1168	1293	–	The Glaidstane	127	The Clach, The Eileans, The Leug, The Spoig
Holy Island	Eilean Mo Laise	Arran	253	17	–	Mullach Mòr	314	None
Inchmarnock	Innis Mheàrnaig	Bute	253	0	1980s		60	None
Little Cumbrae	Cumaradh Beag	Bute	313	0	1990s	Lighthouse Hill	123	The Broad Islands, Castle Island, Trail Isle
Sanda	Àbhainn	Kintyre	127	0	Early 2000s		123	Glunimore Island, Henrietta Reef, Scart Rocks, Paterson's Rock, Sheep Island

=== Outlying islands ===
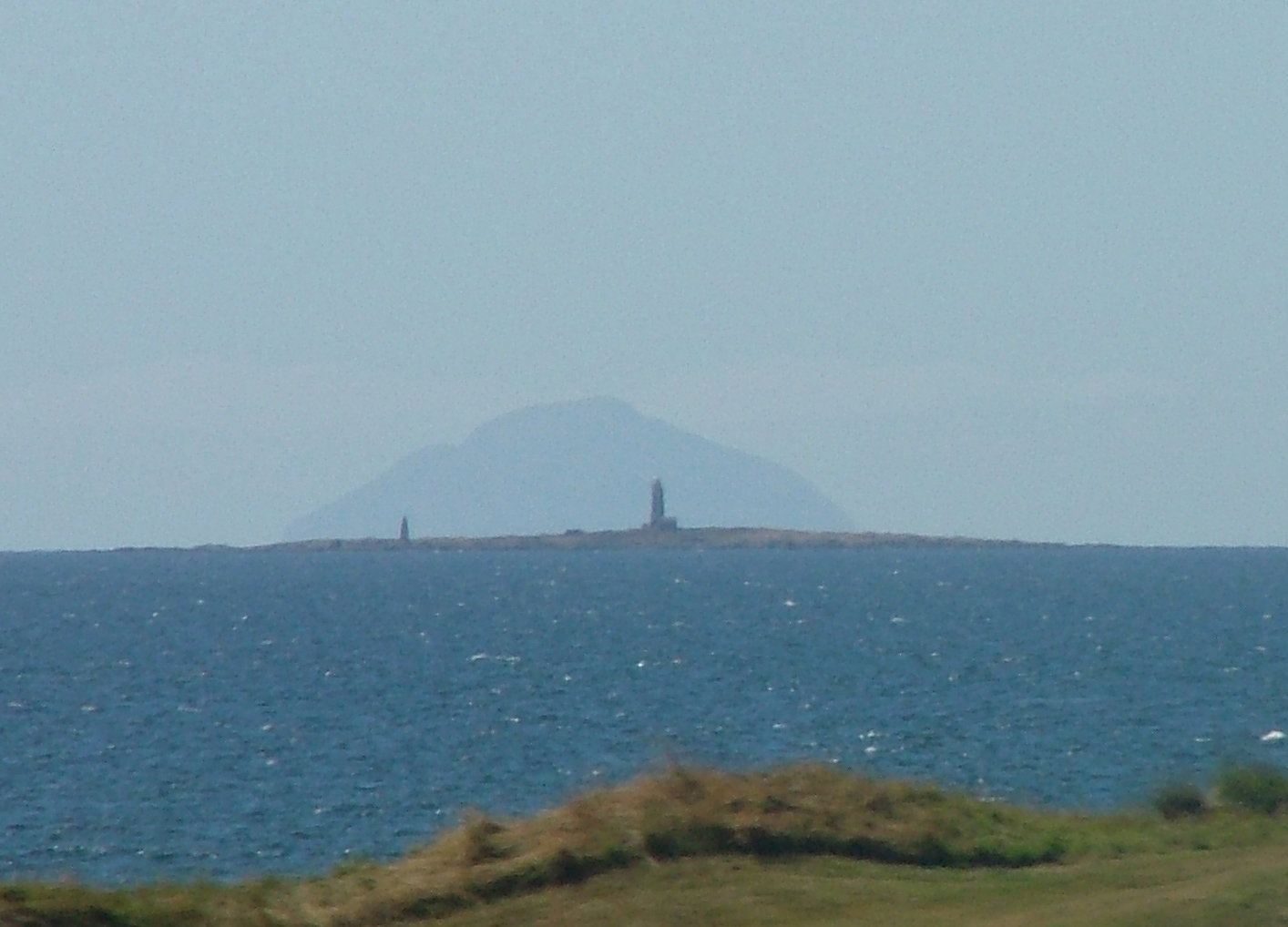
Lady Isle with Ailsa Craig beyond

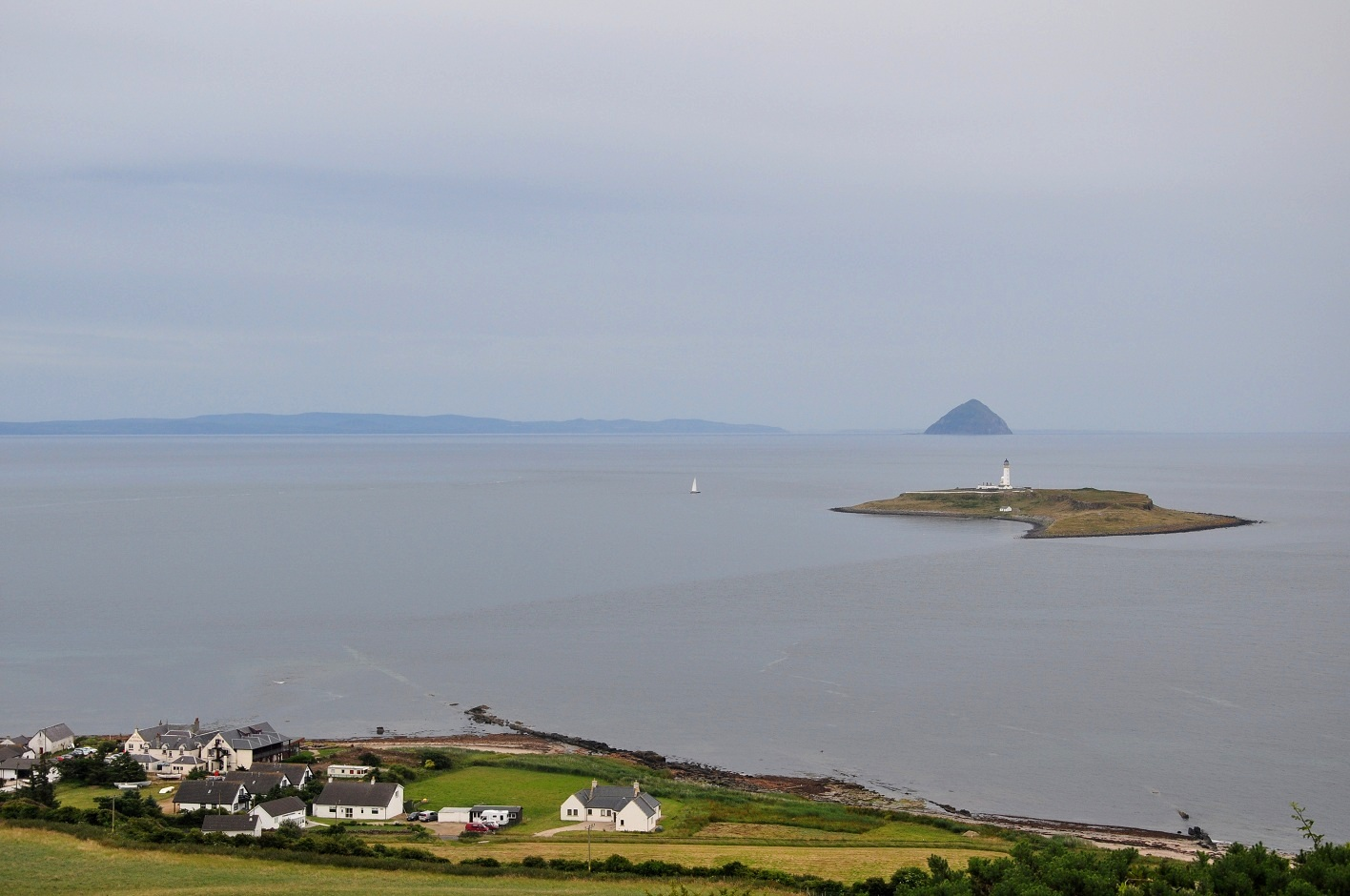
Three islands of the Clyde: The village of Kildonan on Arran, Pladda and Ailsa Craig

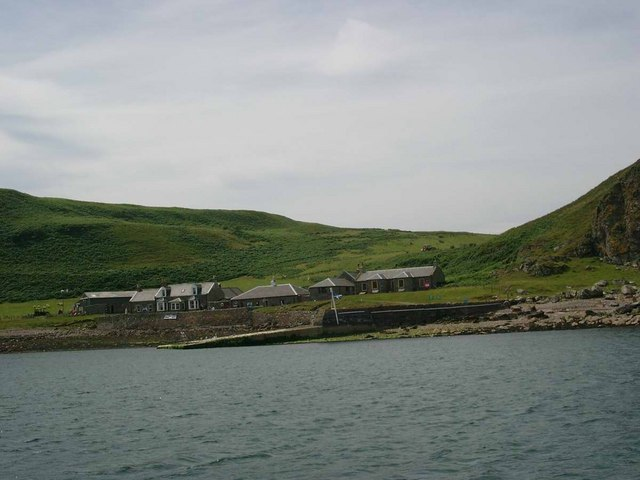
The Byron Darnton tavern and holiday cottages on Sanda. The inn is named after a 1946 shipwreck on the island.

The islets that lie remote from the larger islands are described separately below.

There are two islets in Gare Loch: Green Island and Perch Rock. Gare Loch is small, but it hosts the Faslane Naval Base, where the UK's Trident nuclear submarines are located. At its southern end, the loch opens into the Firth of Clyde via the Rhu narrows.

There are also several islets in the Kilbrannan Sound, which lies between Arran and the Kintyre peninsula. They are: An Struthlag, Cour Island, Eilean Carrach (Carradale), Eilean Carrach (Skipness), Eilean Grianain, Eilean Sunadale, Gull Isle, Island Ross and Thorn Isle.

(The Norse sagas tell a story about the Kintyre peninsula. In the late 11th century, a king of Norway (Magnus Barefoot) devised a plan to increase his territorial possessions. He persuaded a king of Scotland (Malcolm III or Edgar) to agree that he could take possession of an area of land on the west coast of Scotland if a ship could sail around it. Magnus then arranged for one of his longships to be dragged across the 1.5 kilometres (0.93 mi)-long isthmus at the northern tip of the Kintyre peninsula, which connects Kintyre to the mainland. (The isthmus lies between East Loch Tarbert and West Loch Tarbert). He took command of the ship's tiller himself. Then, declaring that Kintyre had "better land than the best of the Hebrides", he claimed that dragging his ship across the isthmus had been equivalent to “sailing around” the peninsula, and thus that the peninsula counted as “land around which a ship could sail.” As a result of this maneuver, he was able to claim possession of the peninsula, which remained under Norse rule for more than a dozen years. (Note: This tale is related in the Norse sagas, but the context is confused. They assert that the arrangement was made with King Malcolm, but in fact it was Edgar who was King of Scots at the time.))

There are also several islets and skerries in Loch Fyne, which extends 65 kilometres (40 mi) inland from the Sound of Bute, and is the longest of Scotland's sea lochs. They are: Duncuan Island, Eilean Ardgaddan, Eilean a' Bhuic, Eilean Aoghainn, Eilean a' Chomhraig, Eilean an Dúnain, Eilean Buidhe (Ardmarnock), Eilean Buidhe (Portavadie), Eilean Fraoch, Eilean Math-ghamhna, Eilean Mór, Glas Eilean, Heather Island, Inverneil Island, Kilbride Island, and Liath Eilean.

There are several islets surrounding Horse Isle in North Ayrshire: Broad Rock, East Islet, Halftide Rock, High Rock and North Islet.

Lady Isle lies off the South Ayrshire coast near Troon. At one time it housed "ane old chapell with an excellent spring of water". However, in June 1821, someone set fire to the "turf and pasture". Once the pasture had burned away, gales blew much of the island's soil into the sea. This permanently destroyed the island's ability to support grazing.

There are no islands in Loch Goil or Loch Long, which are fjord-like arms in the northern part of the firth.

=== Non-island areas with “island” in their name ===
Here is a list of places along that shores of the Firth of Clyde that are not islands, but have names that misleadingly suggest they are islands (eilean being Gaelic for "island"): Eilean na Beithe, Portavadie; Eilean Beag, Cove; Eilean Dubh, Dalchenna, Loch Fyne; Eilean nan Gabhar, Melldalloch, Kyles of Bute; Barmore Island, just north of Tarbert, Kintyre; Eilean Aoidh, south of Portavadie; Eilean Leathan, Kilbrannan Sound just south of Torrisdale Bay; Island Muller, Kilbrannan Sound north of Campbeltown.

== Natural history ==
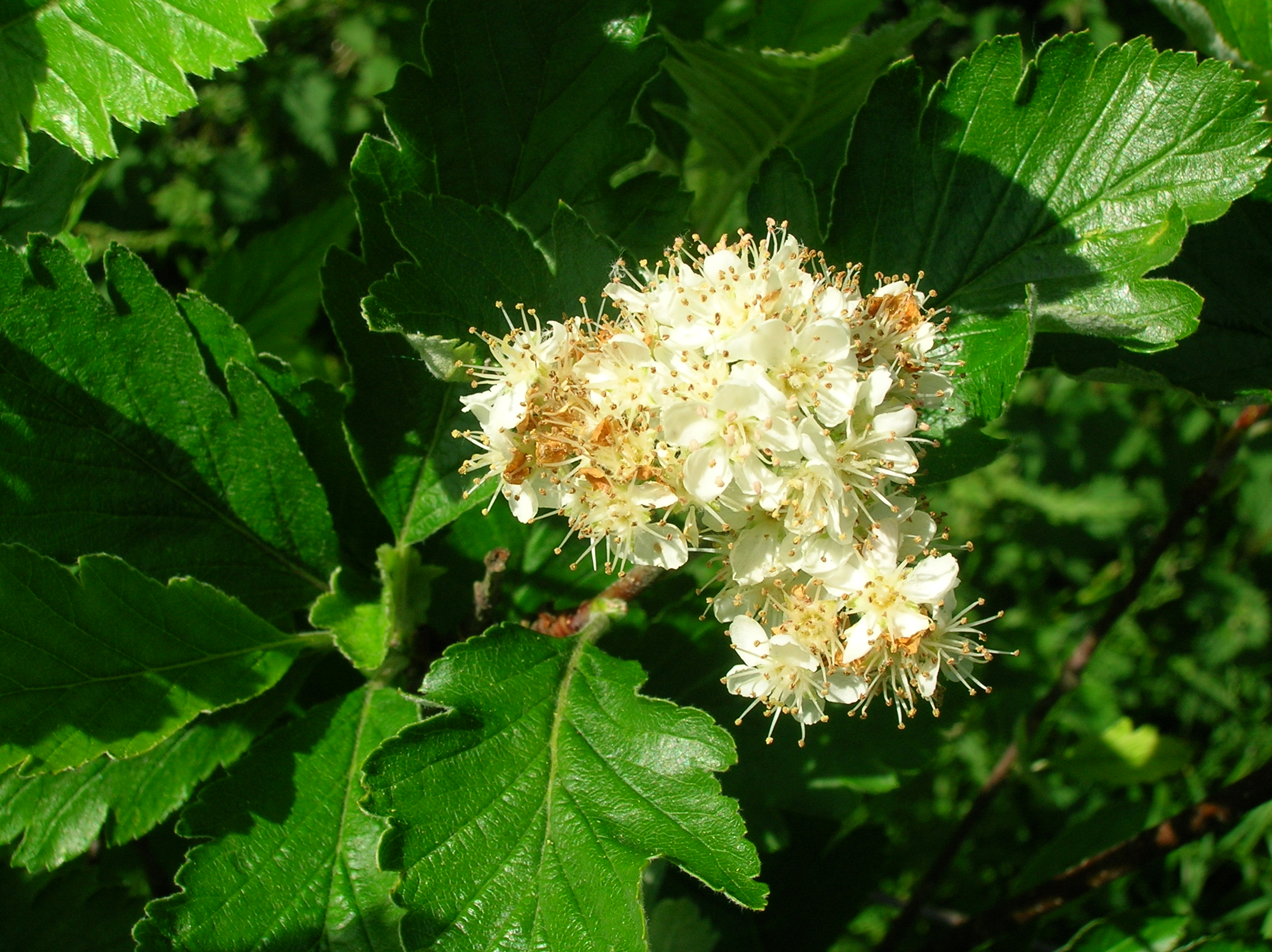
The Arran whitebeam in flower at Eglinton Country Park, Irvine

Around the Firth of Clyde, there are populations of red deer, red squirrel, badger, otter, adder, and common lizard. In the Firth itself, there are harbour porpoises, basking sharks and various species of dolphin. Davaar is home to a population of wild goats.

Over 200 bird species have been recorded as sighted in the area, including the black guillemot, the eider, the peregrine falcon, and the golden eagle. In 1981, there were 28 ptarmigans sighted on Arran, but in 2009 it was reported that extensive surveys had been unable to find any recorded ptarmigans sightings. Similarly, the red-billed chough no longer breeds on the island.

Arran has three species of the rare endemic trees known as Arran Whitebeams: the Scottish or Arran whitebeam; the cut-leaved whitebeam; and the Catacol whitebeam. All of them are found only in Gleann Diomhan, and they are amongst the most endangered tree species in the world. (Gleann Diomhan was formerly part of a designated national nature reserve—the designation was removed in 2011)- and it continues to be part of an area designated as a Site of Special Scientific Interest.) Only 283 Arran whitebeam and 236 cut-leaved whitebeam were recorded as mature trees in 1980, and it is thought that grazing pressures and insect damage are preventing regeneration of the woodland. The Catacol whitebeam was discovered in 2007, but only two specimens have been found, so steps have been taken to protect them.

== Etymology ==
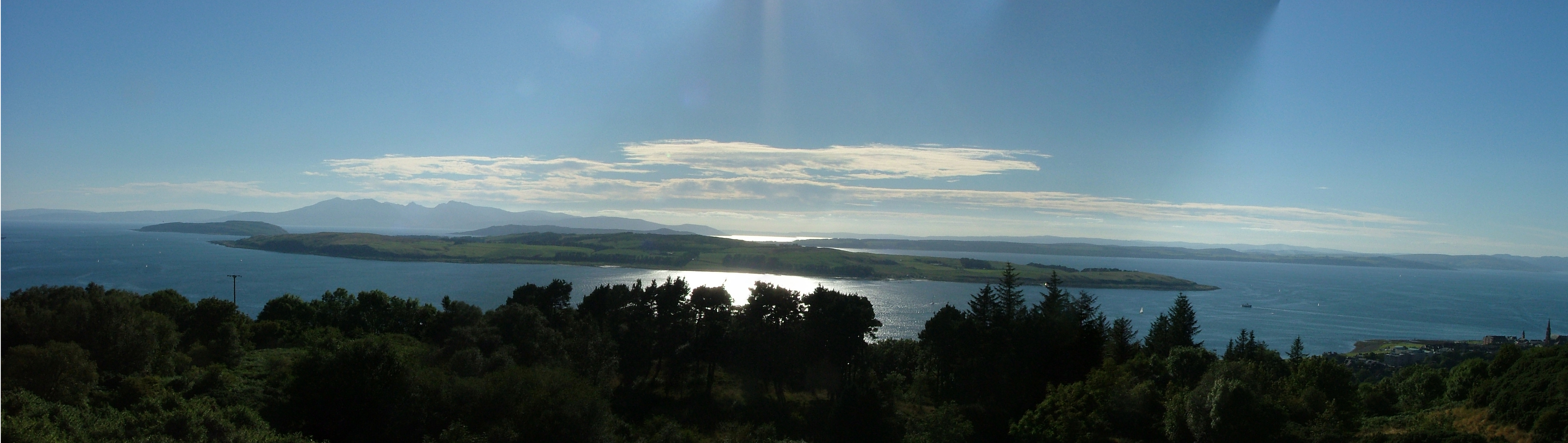
The Cumbraes with Arran and Bute beyond

The Roman historian Tacitus refers to the Clota, meaning the Clyde. The derivation is not certain but is probably from the Brythonic Clouta, which became Clut in Old Welsh. The name literally means "wash", probably referring to a river goddess who is seen as "the washer" or "the strongly flowing one". The derivation of the word “Bute” is also uncertain. The Norse name for it is Bót an Old Irish word for "fire", which might be a reference to signal fires. The etymology of “Arran” is no clearer. Haswell-Smith (2004) suggests that it derive from a Brythonic word meaning "high place", although Watson (1926) suggests it may be pre-Celtic. (Note: In support of the controversial Vasconic substratum hypothesis, Theo Vennemann notes the recurrence of the element aran, (Unified Basque haran) meaning"valley", in names like Val d'Aran, Arundel, or Arendal.)

Island	Derivation	Language	Meaning	Modern Gaelic name	Alternative Derivations
Arran	Possibly Aran	Brythonic	high place	Arainn	Possibly pre-Celtic
Bute	Bót (see above)	Norse or Gaelic	Possibly "fire isle"	Eilean Bhòid or Bód	Possibly from Brythonic budh for "corn" and previously known as Rothesay meaning "Roderick's island"
Davaar	Eilean Dà Bhàrr	Gaelic	Barr's island	Eilean Dà Bhàrr	
Great Cumbrae	Cymri	English/Brythonic	place of the Brythonic people	Cumaradh Mòr	Gaelic literally means "place of the Cymric people". Previously known in English as Great or Greater Cumray.
Holy Island	–	English	Refers to Molaise of Leighlin	Eilean Mo Laise	Previously known as "Lamlash", the English name was adopted in 1830 when the Arran village took this name. In Gaelic, the island is also known as "An t-Eilean Àrd" (the high island).
Sanda	Sandtange or Havin	Old Norse or Danish	sandspit or anchorage	Àbhainn	Also known as "Sanda Island"

== See also ==
- Scottish island names
- Rathlin Island
- Sleeping Warrior
- Arran Single Malt
- Mount Stuart House
- Cathedral of the Isles
- Earl of Arran (Scotland)
- Marquess of Bute
- Mull of Kintyre test
