= Kilchattan Bay =

Coordinates: 55.751°N 5.024°W

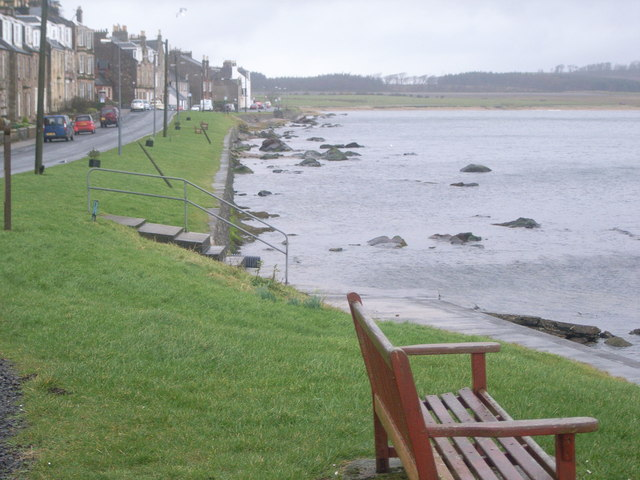
- Kilchattan Bay

- Location within Argyll and Bute
- OS grid reference: NS102549
- Civil parish: Kingarth
- Council area: Argyll and Bute
- Lieutenancy area: Argyll and Bute
- Country: Scotland
- Sovereign state: United Kingdom
- Post town: ISLE OF BUTE
- Postcode district: PA20
- Dialling code: 01700
- Police: Scotland
- Fire: Scottish
- Ambulance: Scottish
- UK Parliament: Argyll, Bute and South Lochaber
- Scottish Parliament: Argyll and Bute

Kilchattan Bay is a village on the Isle of Bute, Scotland. It lies on the island's southern end, along the coast road at the foot of a steep hill called the Suidhe Chattan which shields the village from the prevailing westerly wind. The village faces the mainland to the east across the Firth of Clyde. A sandy bay known locally as the Wee Bay sweeps around to the north.

To the south along the coast is the start of the West Island Way which leads along the rocky shore and past the lighthouse which marks the southern end of the island.

== History ==
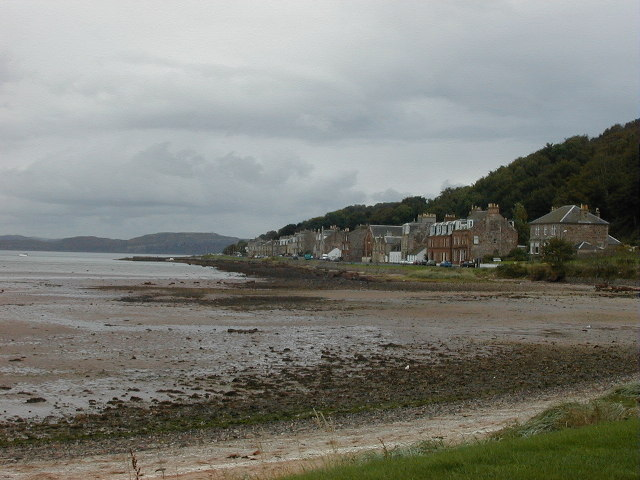
The village, looking south along the shore

The village is named after the sixth century bishop, Saint Cathan, who established a hermitage at this location in AD 539. His nephew was Saint Blane and a chapel was established in his honour in the 12th century. St. Blane's Chapel still exists as a ruin, one mile to the south of Kilchattan village.

The village developed as a row of fisherman's houses. Further developments included a quarry, stone pier and a lime kiln which can still be seen behind St. Blane's Villa. The limestone used in the kiln was mined on the hillside behind the village. Some of the old mine workings are now used as the reservoir for the village. Overlooking the reservoir are the ruined remains of Kelspoke Castle.

A new wooden pier was constructed in 1880 when the village became a regular port-of-call for steamers which carried trippers from the great city of Glasgow and local traffic such as the output of the tile factory at Kingarth. St. Blane's Hotel was constructed between the two piers and still services the tourist trade today as a holiday home. Since that heyday, the steamer traffic has disappeared with the new pier closing in 1955 to scheduled steamers. The pier was then used on an occasional basis before the wooden structure deteriorated and was demolished in 1976. Queen Elizabeth II and her consort landed on the pier from the Royal Yacht Britannia in 1957 on a visit to the island before driving through the village. The old stone pier, being more durable, has been renovated and now serves as the main landing point.

The village at one stage had a post office, drapers, bakery, grocers, greengrocers, cafe (owned by the family of Lena Zavaroni) and a tearoom at the pier. It was also one of the last places in Scotland (until the early 1970s) where milk was delivered from a churn with residents collecting their milk in jugs from a churn on the back of a van.

A landslide in 2011 removed a section of the path from the village to the top of Suidhe Chattan.

== Famous residents and visitors ==
- Clive Anderson
- Graeme Lamb - holidayed here regularly.
- Ken W. MacDonald - owns a home in the village.
- Ian McCalman singer songwriter has a flat in the bay.

== See also ==
- Isle of Bute
