= River Ruel =

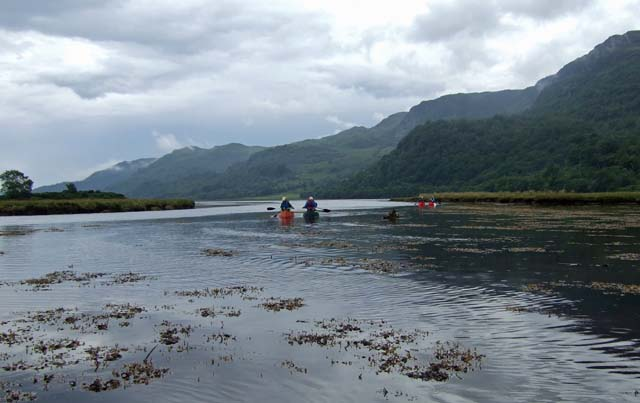
- The river's outflow at Loch Ruel, looking south

Physical characteristics
- Source
  - location: Cowal
  - coordinates: 56.09090800°N 5.078364971°W
- Mouth: Loch Ruel
  - location: Cowal
  - coordinates: 55.96331773°N 5.19057047°W

River Ruel is a watercourse in Argyll and Bute, Scotland. Around 9 miles (14 km) long, it flows into Loch Ruel (also known as Loch Riddon).

The river passes settlements such as Clachan of Glendaruel and Ormsdale.
