= Sgat Mòr and Sgat Beag =

Scottish islands

Coordinates: 55.84805°N 5.30821°W

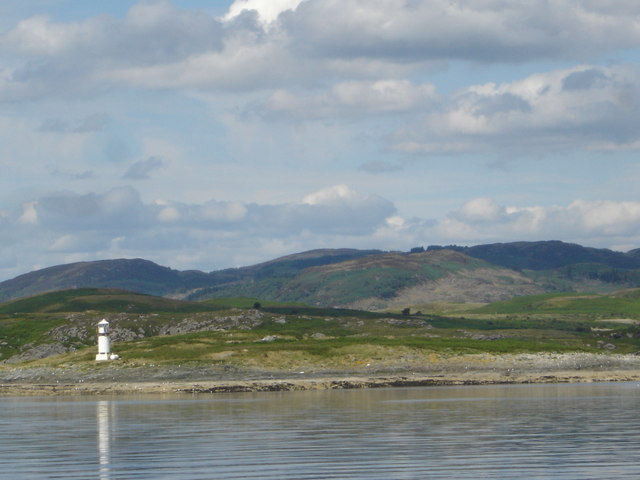
Sgat Mòr with Cowal behind.

Sgat Mòr and Sgat Beag (Scottish Gaelic pronunciation: [s̪kat̪ moːrˠ ɪs̪ s̪kat̪ pɛk]; English: The Skate Islands or, less commonly, Skate Island and Wee Skate Island) are two small islands that lie at the mouth of Loch Fyne by the shore of the Cowal peninsula on the west coast of Scotland.

Sgat Mòr lies at grid reference NR930666 directly south of Eilean Aoidhe and rises just 11 metres (36 ft) above sea level. Sgat Beag is a similar but slightly smaller island that lies approximately 1 kilometre to the east, across the mouth of Asgog Bay.

The islands appear to have been named after the Skate fish however there is a Skate Point and Skate Bay on nearby Great Cumbrae so it is not impossible that skate is a local toponym with a different derivation.

The channel between Sgat Mòr and the Cowal shoreline at Eilean Aoidhe is navigable and local sailing regattas, paddle steamer Waverley and MV Balmoral regularly pass inside this narrow channel. The waters to the south of the islands are the deepest in the Clyde area.

A beacon resembling a small lighthouse is situated on the southwestern shore of Sgat Mòr.

== Wildlife ==
Sgat Mòr was traditionally a habitat for the Common eider, however predation from invasive mink caused breeding to collapse in the mid 2000s.

== Shipwrecks ==
Sgat Mòr and Sgat Beag have historically presented a considerable hazard to shipping and in excess of nine ships have foundered on or near the islands.

- Peggy, a sloop, dragged its anchor ashore and was lost, 4 March 1806;
- The Brandon, a lighter was blown out of Tarbert Harbour, and wrecked at Sgat Mòr with the crew saved, 12 February 1856;
- The Banshee, a Wherry carrying 35 tonnes of coal from Glasgow to Inveraray was stranded on the rocks and was a complete loss, 31 May 1882;
- Euphemia, a wooden lugger out of Lochranza collided with steamship St Kilda resulting in the death of two of the three crew members, 17 July 1888;
- Mary, a wooden lugger out of Port Bannatyne collided with steamship Battle Isle, 23 September 1898;
- The Warlock, an iron steamship, with cargo of crushed granite foundered three miles south of the Sgat Mòr, 19 November 1905;
- Hilda, a cutter stranded on rocks on the East side of Sgat Mòr, 4 August 1906;
- Moonlight (formerly the SS Ormsa), a steam-powered barge, on route from Furnace to Ormidale at the head of Loch Riddon, foundered in heavy seas south of Sgat Beag while making for shelter at Sgat Mòr with the loss of four of the five people on board, 25 August 1948;
- The Tynesider a tug on route from Troon to Ardcastle, Lochgair that became grounded on Sgat Mòr and sank following several attempts to pull her from the island, 5 April 1994.

== See also ==
- List of islands of Scotland
