= West Island Way =

Footpath in Argyll and Bute, Scotland

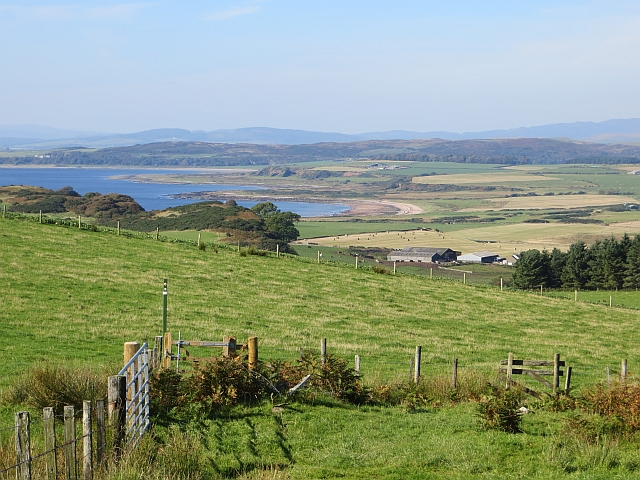
- The West Island Way near Kilchattan Bay.
- Length: 48 km (30 mi)
- Location: Isle of Bute, Scotland
- Established: 2000
- Designation: Scotland's Great Trails
- Trailheads: Kilchattan Bay (55.751°N 5.024°W); Port Bannatyne (55.860°N 5.082°W)
- Use: Walking
- Elevation gain/loss: 690 metres (2,260 ft) gain
- Lowest point: Sea level
- Waymark: Yes
- Website: http://www.westislandway.co.uk/

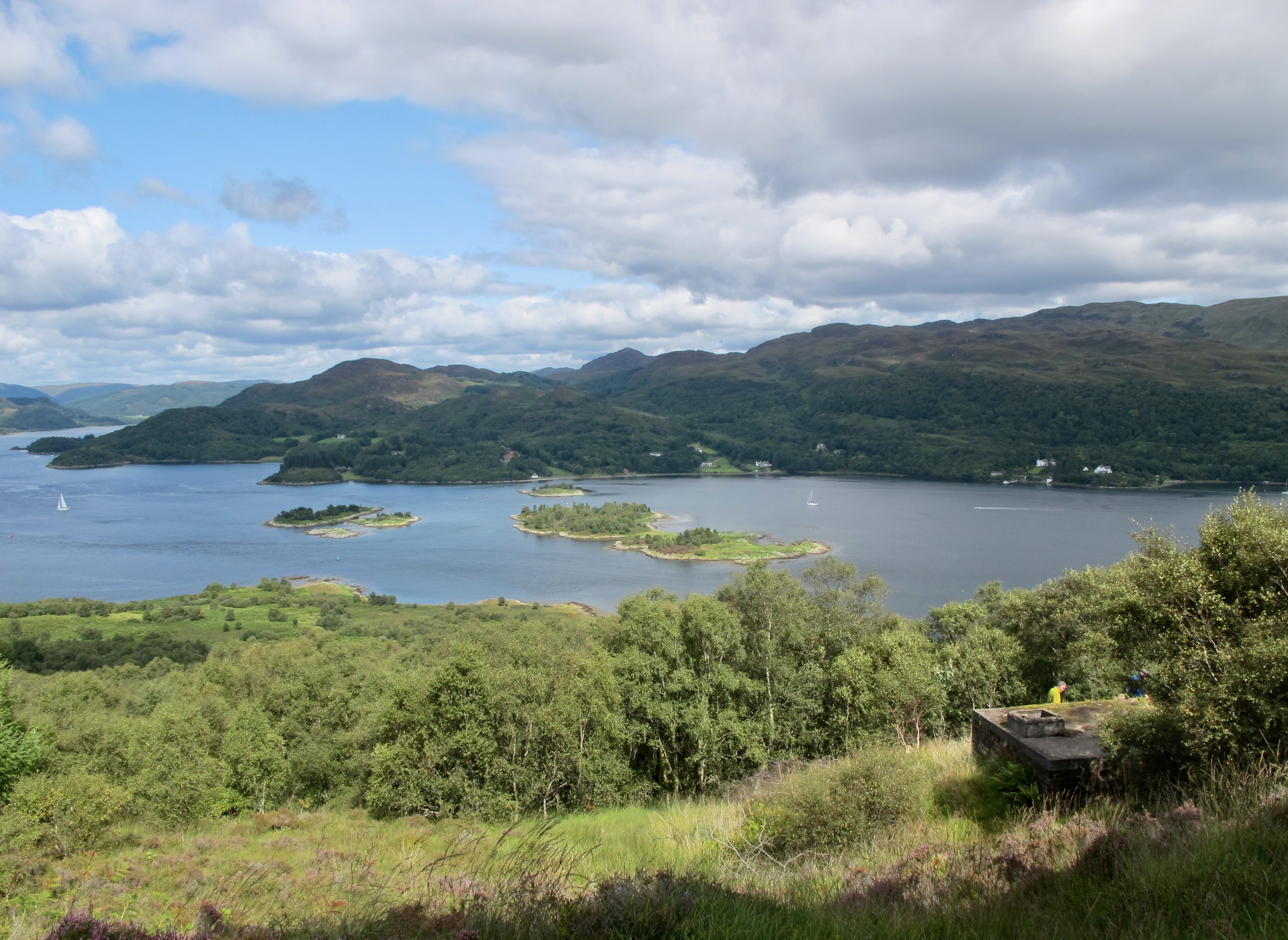
A north branch of the way leads to the Balnakailly Starfish bunker scenic viewpoint looking over the Kyles of Bute and the Burnt Islands.

The West Island Way is a waymarked long distance footpath on the Isle of Bute. The route opened in September 2000 as part of Bute's millennium celebrations, and was the first waymarked long distance route on a Scottish island. As of 2018 it was estimated that between six and seven thousand people were using the trail each year. The route is designated as one of Scotland's Great Trails by NatureScot.

== Description ==
It is a fairly easy walk of approximately 48 kilometres (30 mi), passing through seashore, moorland, farmland and forest. The route begins at Kilchattan Bay in the south of the island, and finishes at Port Bannatyne in the north, with Rothesay, the main town on Bute, as a central point. The hike can be completed over two fairly lengthy walking days, or four shorter days. The official map and guide of the route is available from the Bute Discovery Centre in Rothesay.
