= Burnt Islands =

Coordinates: 55.928°N 5.175°W

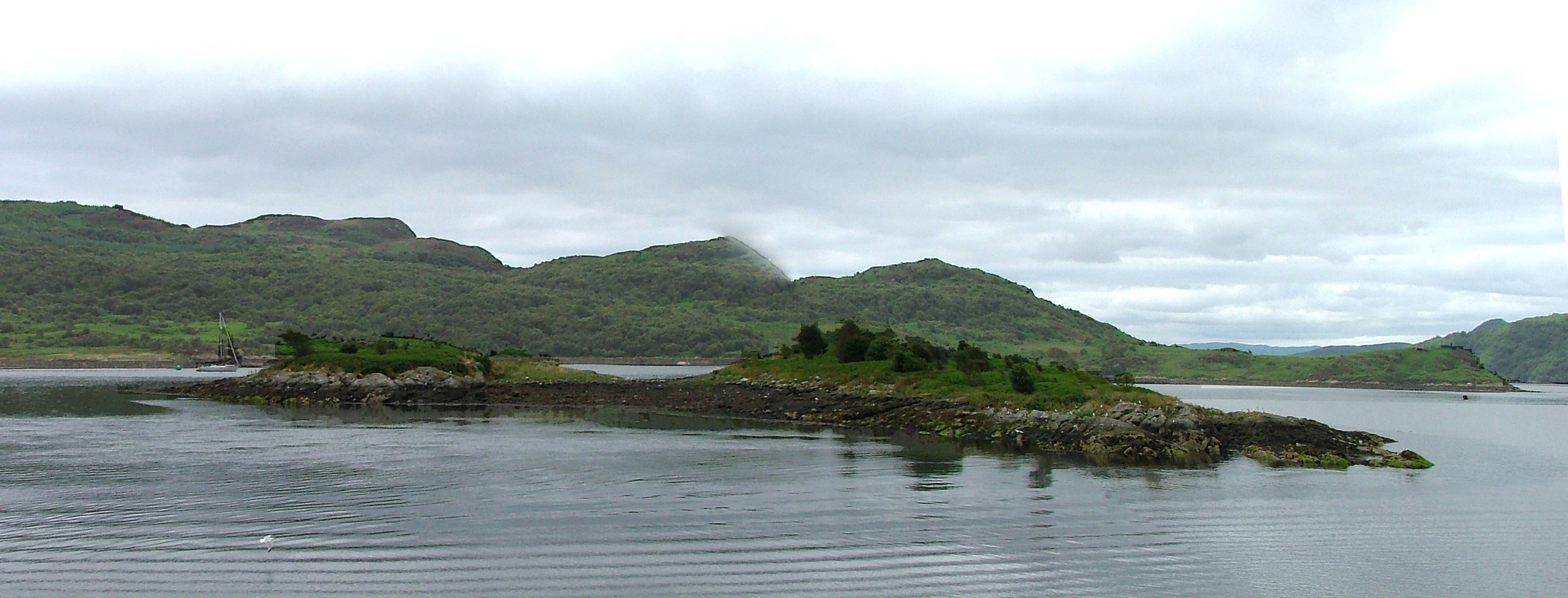
- Eilean Fraoich photographed from the PS Waverley.

Location
- Location within Scotland

Physical geography
- Island group: Burnt Islands

Administration
- Council area: Argyll and Bute
- Country: Scotland
- Sovereign state: United Kingdom

Demographics
- Population: 0

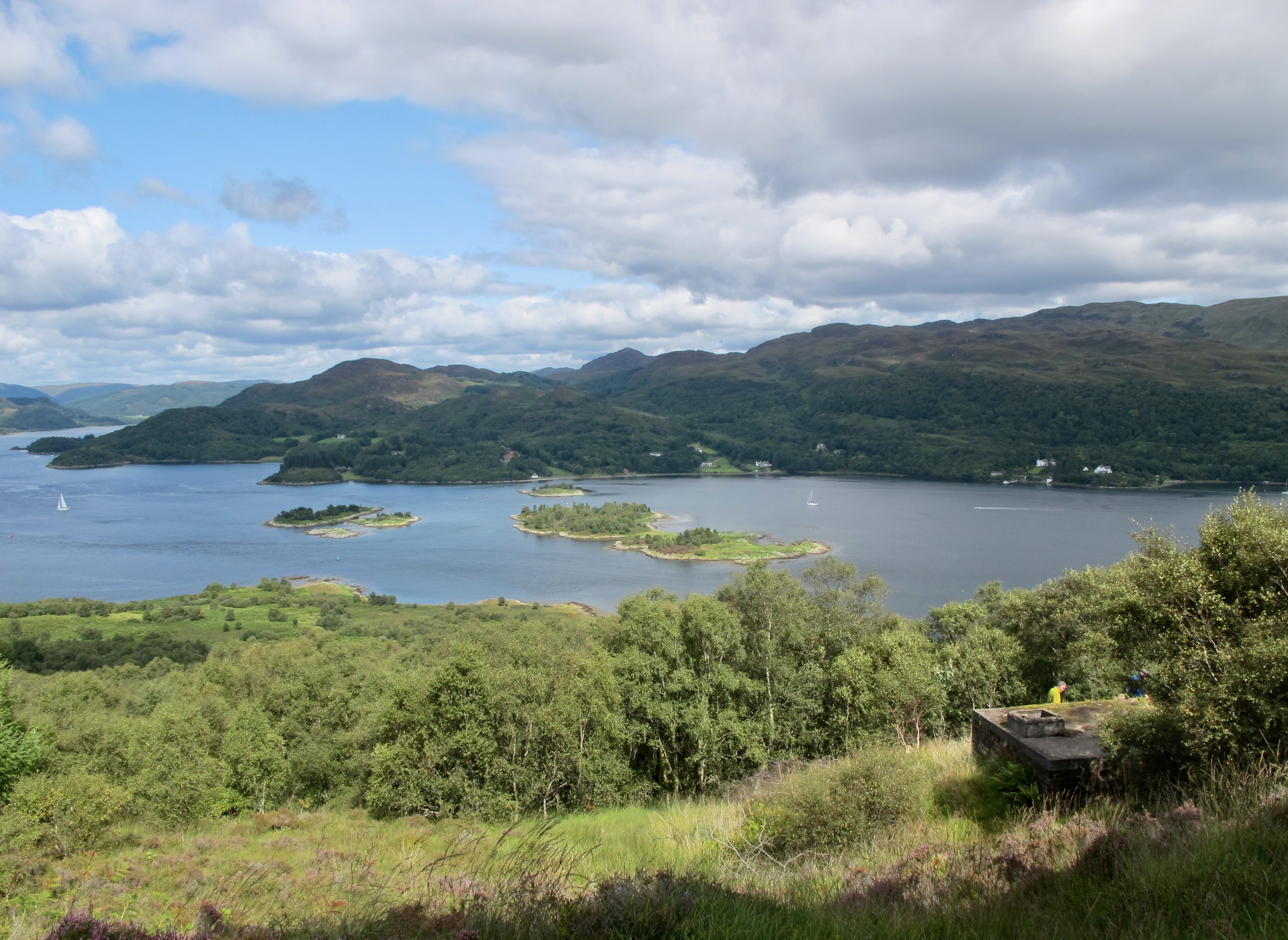
The Kyles of Bute and the Burnt Islands, seen from the Balnakailly Starfish bunker on the West Island Way

The Burnt Islands (Scottish Gaelic: Na h-Eileanan Loisgte) are three small islands that lie in the Kyles of Bute, on the Cowal Peninsula, Argyll and Bute, on the West coast of the Scottish mainland. The islands are located at grid reference NS017752.

Individually the Islands are known by their Gaelic names. From the largest to the smallest they are Eilean Mòr (Large Island), Eilean Fraoich (Heather Island) and Eilean Buidhe (Yellow Island). Oddly only the smallest of these tiny islets, Eilean Buidhe, shows any sign of ever having been permanently inhabited having the remains of a vitrified fort on it. Eilean Mòr, huge in comparison, supports only a stunted woodland at its northern end.

All water going traffic that travels through the kyles has to negotiate either the narrow sound that separates Eilean Buidhe from Eilean Mòr and Eilean Fraoich or pass south of the islands, via the Wood Farm buoy. The narrows, which are the principal route for commercial traffic, are marked by four light buoys, two on each side.

A little to the west Eilean Dubh (Black Island) lies at the entrance to Loch Riddon and to the north Eilean Dearg lies within the loch.
