= Kelspoke Castle =

Ruined castle overlooking Kilchattan Bay, Isle of Bute, Scotland

Coordinates: 55.7432°N 5.0183°W

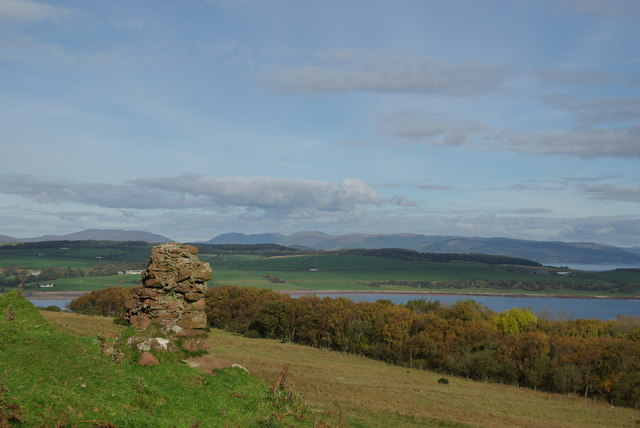
The small fragment that, along with the outline of foundations, constitutes the only visible remains of Kelspoke Castle

Kelspoke Castle is a ruined castle overlooking Kilchattan Bay, Isle of Bute, Scotland. Only a small amount of the ruins are above ground.
