= Eilean Dubh, Kyles of Bute =

Scottish island

Coordinates: 55.93289°N 5.19373°W

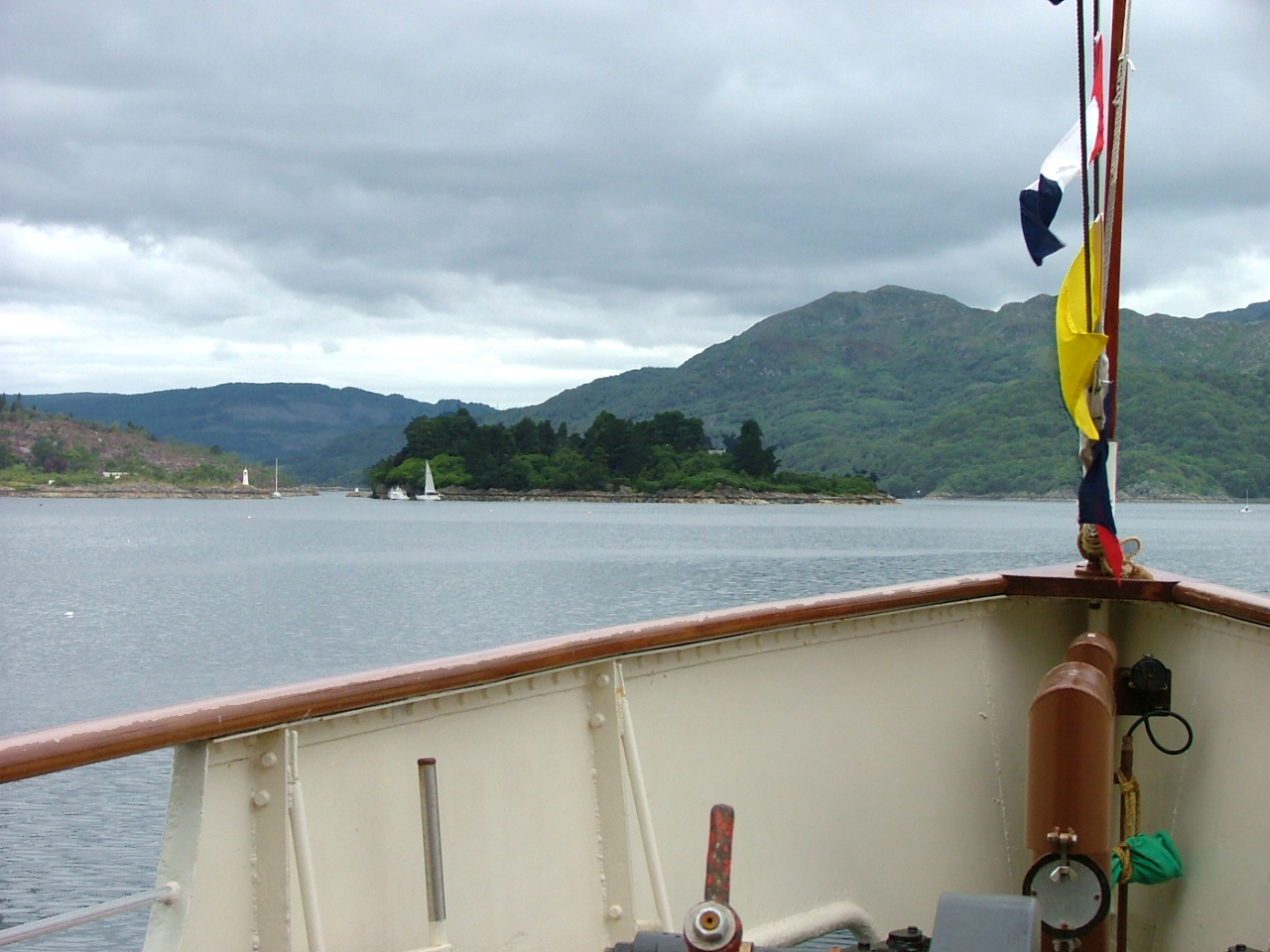
Eilean Dubh seen from the PS Waverley

This particular Eilean Dubh (Scottish Gaelic: Black Island) is sometimes known as Glen Caladh Island and lies just off the Cowal peninsula in the Kyles of Bute. The island is around 0.3 kilometres at its longest length and rises to a height of 19 metres above sea level. It is almost entirely covered by woodland.

Although Eilean Dubh is uninhabited, the island's owners, the Ingham Clarks, have their family graveyard here. There is a light to aid navigation at the northern tip of the island.

The island forms the idyllic "An Caladh/An Cala" (Scottish Gaelic for "harbour") on the Cowal coast line that was used as a location in BBC television's dramatisation of the Para Handy tales.

Eilean Dearg lies to the north and the Burnt Islands lie just to the east.

== See also ==
- List of islands of Scotland
