= Kyles of Bute =

Channel in Argyll and Bute, Scotland

Kyles of Bute National Scenic Area
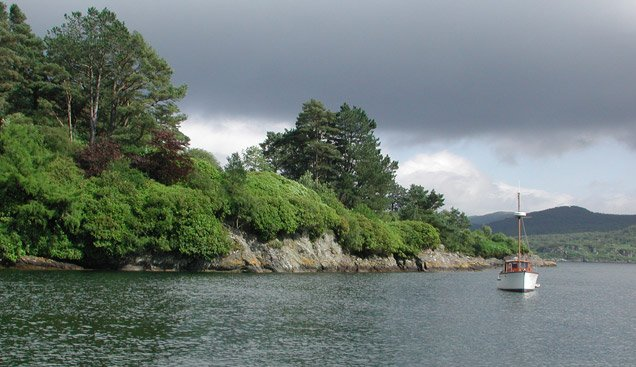
- Caladh Harbour, Kyles of Bute. Taken in the anchorage behind Eilean Dubh. The Isle of Bute can be seen in the distance.

- Location within Argyll and Bute
- Location: Argyll and Bute, Scotland
- Coordinates: 55.930°N 5.187°W
- Area: 57.4 km^{2} (22.2 sq mi)
- Established: 1981
- Governing body: NatureScot

The Kyles of Bute (Scottish Gaelic: Na Caoil Bhòdach) form a narrow sea channel that separates the northern end of the Isle of Bute from the Cowal Peninsula in Argyll and Bute, on the Scottish mainland. The surrounding hillsides are roughly wooded, and overlooked by rocky tops and areas of moorland. The Kyles are split into the East and West Kyles.

The East Kyle (Scottish Gaelic: An Caol an Ear) runs from Rothesay Bay north west up to the entrance to Loch Riddon. At the south-eastern end of the East Kyle, the Kyle meets the Firth of Clyde and Loch Striven in a stretch of water overlooked by Ardyne Point and Strone Point on Cowal. At the north-western end of the East Kyle are the Burnt Islands and the island of Eilean Dubh.

The West Kyle (Scottish Gaelic: An Caol an Iar/An Caol Ceathrach) runs from the northern end of the East Kyle southwest, past the village of Tighnabruaich out to the Sound of Bute. The area is a designated National Scenic Area.

The Kyles are reflected in the name of Tighnabruaich-based shinty team Kyles Athletic.

== Transport ==
The narrowest strait is only some 300 m (980 ft) across and is spanned by the Calmac ferry from Rhubodach to Colintraive. The crossing takes only five minutes, and runs every half hour throughout the day, seven days a week. Since 1999, the service has been operated by MV Loch Dunvegan, which formerly served on the route from Kyle of Lochalsh to the Isle of Skye. Due to her size relative to the short crossing, the ferry normally sails with both ramps unfolded. As the crossing is so short, the issue of whether the ferry should be replaced by a bridge has been discussed a number of times, for example by Highlands and Islands Enterprise in 1995.

The A8003 road runs above the West Kyle, reaching a height of 130 m (430 ft) just north of Tighnabruaich. On the mainland shore of the East Kyle, the A886 road also takes a route above the shoreline, however the B866 road runs closer to the shore of Loch Riddon. The A and B roads meet just north of Colintraive, from where the route of the A886 continues over the ferry to run along the east shore of Bute to Rothesay.

== Tourism ==
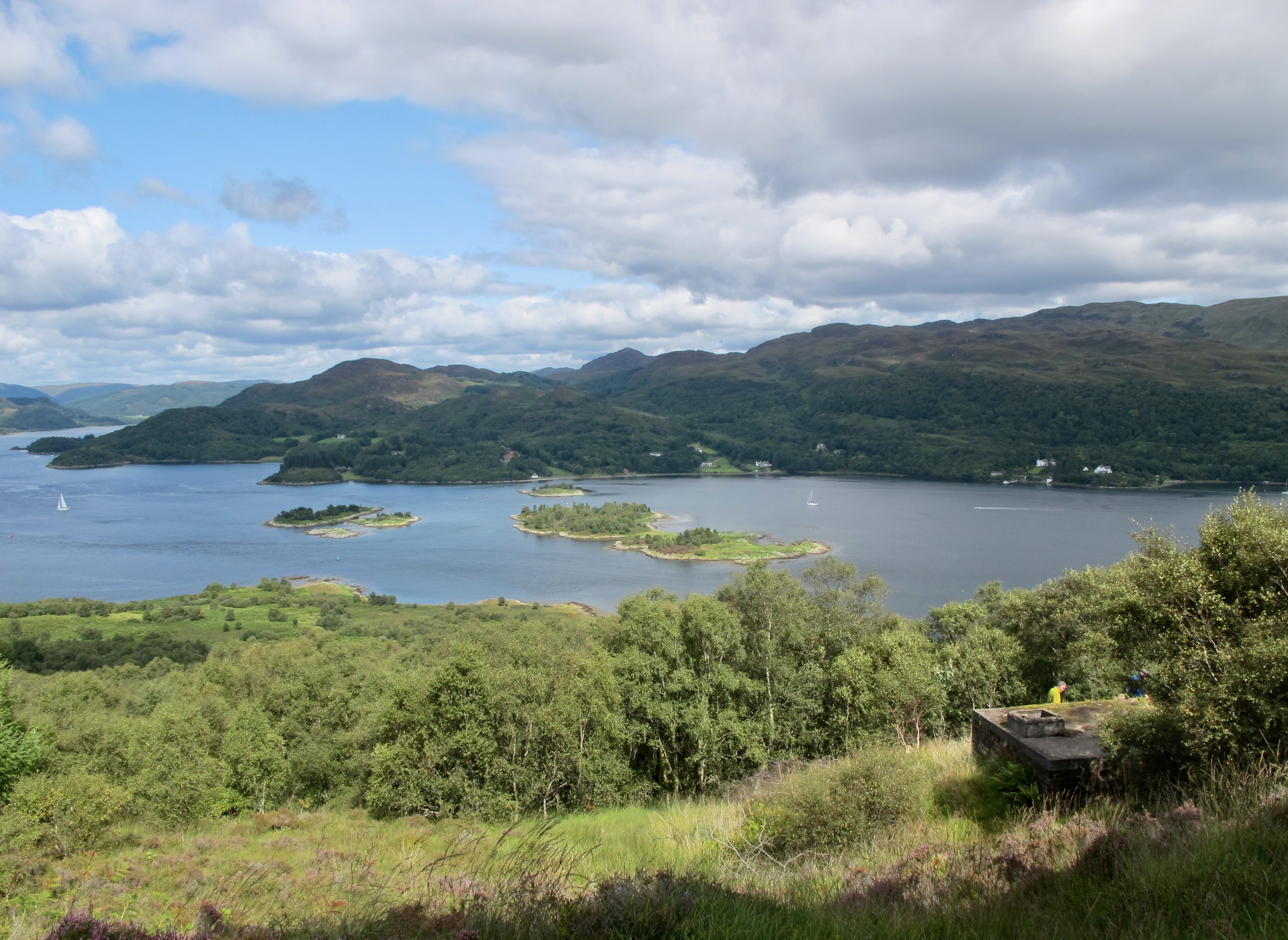
Kyles of Bute and the Burnt Islands, north of the Balnakailly Starfish bunker, a scenic viewpoint on the West Island Way.

A trip through the Kyles of Bute was a common feature of a trip "doon the watter" on a Clyde steamer during the late nineteenth and early twentieth centuries. As of 2025, the PS Waverley, the last sea-going paddle steamer in the world, still operates on the Clyde and continues to offer sailings through the Kyles in spring, summer and autumn. The Kyles are also very popular for yachting, and there are many sheltered anchorages.

The Cowal Way, a waymarked footpath between Tighnabruaich and Tarbet, follows the shoreline of the West Kyle, below the A8003. The West Island Way, a waymarked footpath on the Isle of Bute, follows the western shore of the East Kyle for a section of its northern loop: this section is along the A886. Both routes are officially designated as being among Scotland's Great Trails.

The Kyles form part of an area marketed for tourism purposes as "Argyll's Secret Coast".

== Conservation ==
The area is designated as the Kyles of Bute National Scenic Area, one of the forty such areas in Scotland, which are defined so as to identify areas of exceptional scenery and to ensure its protection from inappropriate development. The designated area covers 5,739 ha (14,180 acres) in total, of which 4,723 ha (11,670 acres) is on land, with a further 1,016 ha (2,510 acres) being marine (i.e. below low tide level), and includes land on Bute and the Cowal peninsula, extending to take in the surroundings of Loch Riddon.

Bird species that can regularly be seen in the Kyles include eider ducks, oystercatchers and herons.

One of the Burnt Islands, Eilean Buidhe, is the site of the remains of a circular vitrified fort about 19.5 m (64 ft) in diameter. The remaining walls stand up to 1.5 m (5 ft) on the eastern side of the site. Further north, Eilean Dearg in Loch Riddon is the site of a Medieval castle that was destroyed by naval action during Argyll's Rising in 1685.

== Ownership ==
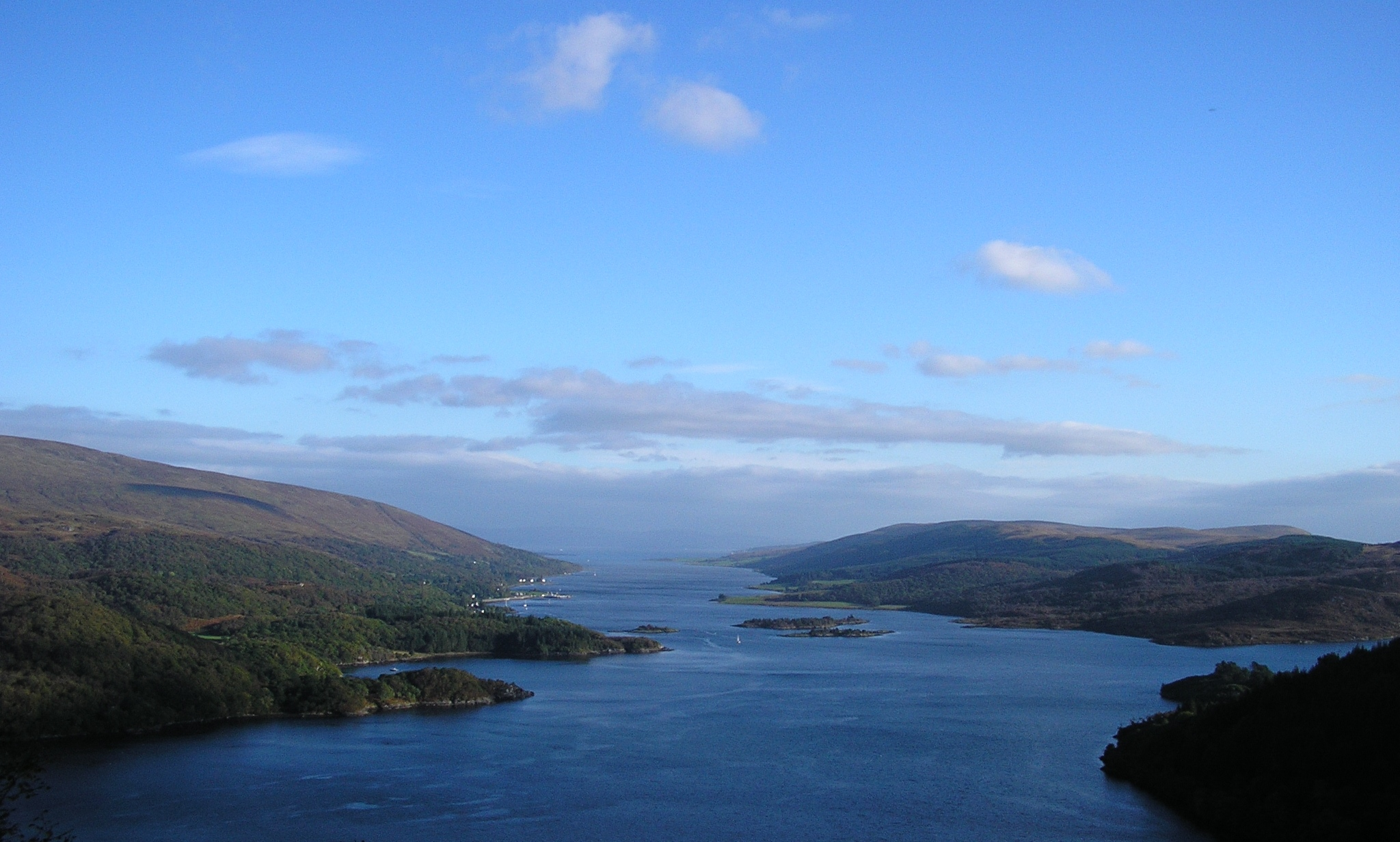
View from near the National Trust for Scotland viewpoint.

The eastern shores of the East Kyle forms the Ardentraive Estate, which is owned by the Mount Stuart Trust, which also owns Mount Stuart House, and most of the Isle of Bute (including the eastern shoreline of the West Kyle). The Mount Stuart Trust is still largely controlled by the family of the Marquess of Bute, the Crichton-Stuarts. The Rhubodach estate on Bute, which includes the western shoreline of the East Kyle was formerly owner by actor and director Lord Attenborough. In August 2009 he placed 2,012 acres (8.14 km^{2}) estate up for sale, and a referendum carried out on 12 February 2010 showed 93% of islanders supported a plan land to buy the land for the community. In January 2011 he sold the estate, which consists mostly of forest for the reduced fee of £1.48 million. The Rhubodach estate is now owned by the Bute Community Land Company, a charitable company formed by residents living on the island. The main landowner on the western shoreline of the West Kyle is the Ardlamont Forest, which as of 2002 was owned by Loch Lomond Distillery. A viewpoint and indicator on the A8003 road overlooking the Kyles belongs to the National Trust for Scotland.

== Fishing ==
The Annual Reports of the Fishery Board for Scotland provide an insight into the abrupt increase of the catch in Kyles of Bute in 1902: "The large increase in the quantity and value of fish accounted for in this station is the result of the fine herring fishing in this area during the last three months of this year.. The decrease was equally dramatic:"Unfortunately the successful herring fishings of the previous two years were not repeated this year in Kyles of Bute. There were indications in September of a shoal of herrings having entered this area, buth they only remained for a short period."

Fishery Statistics

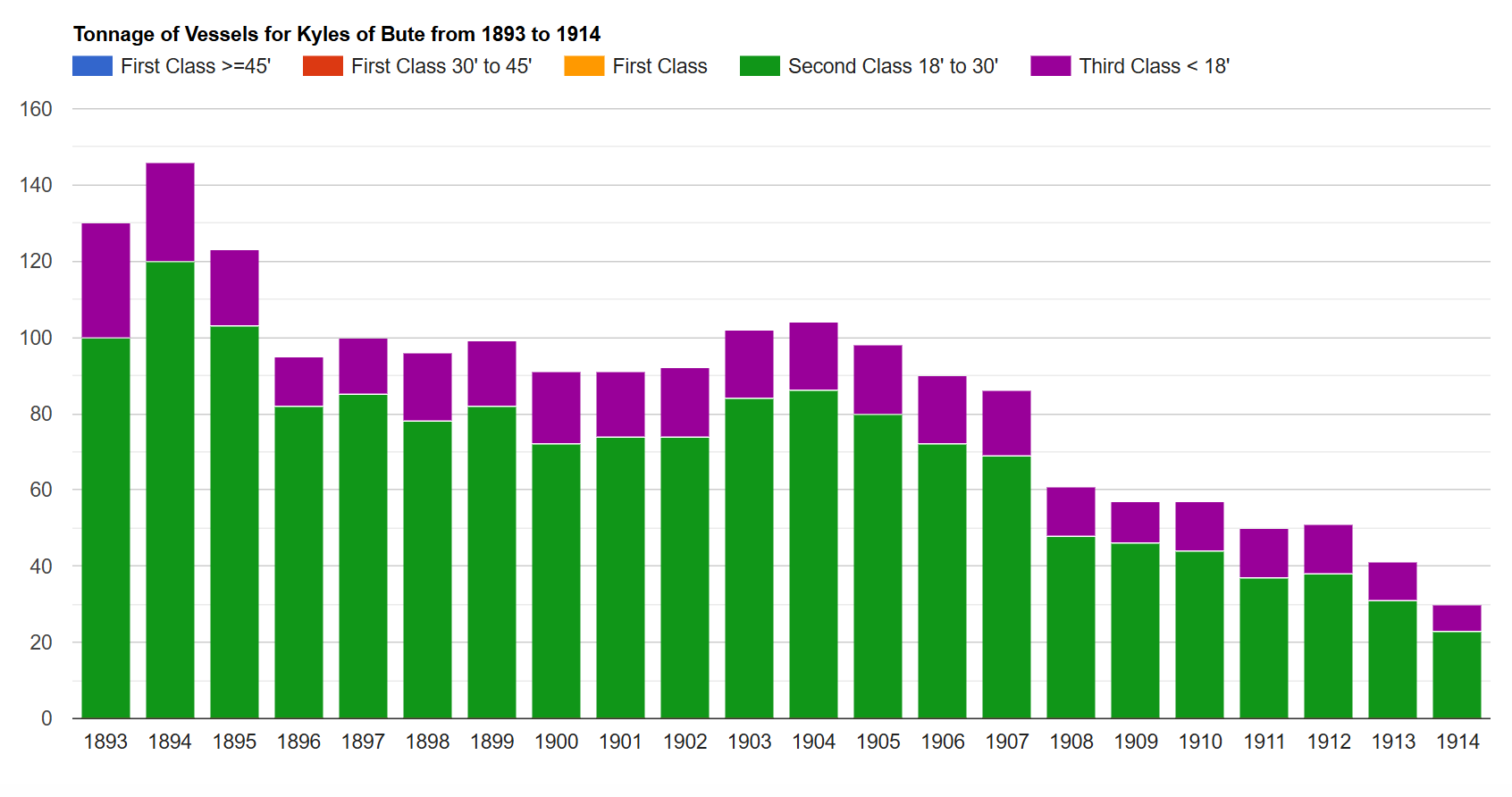
Tonnage of vessels

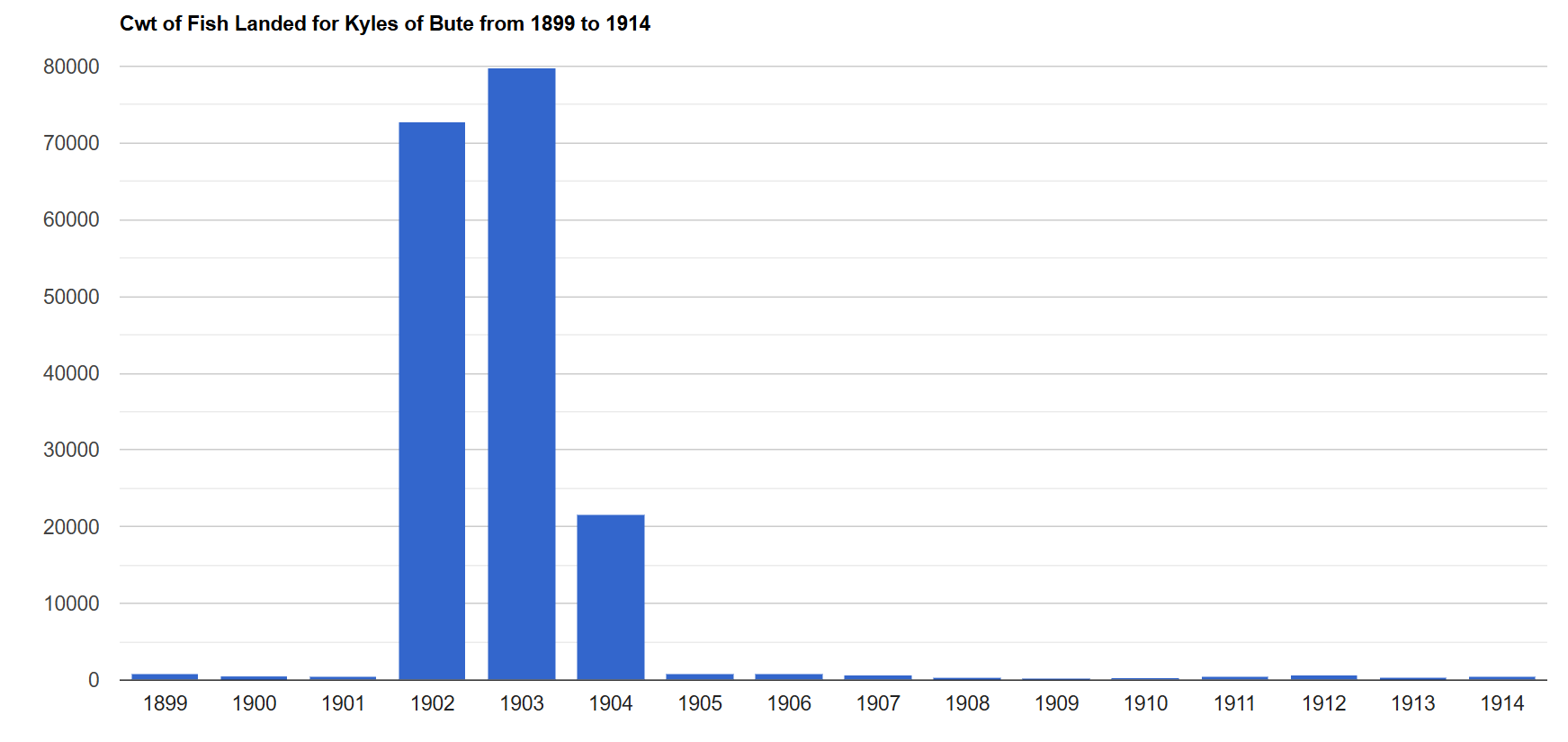
Cwt of fish landed

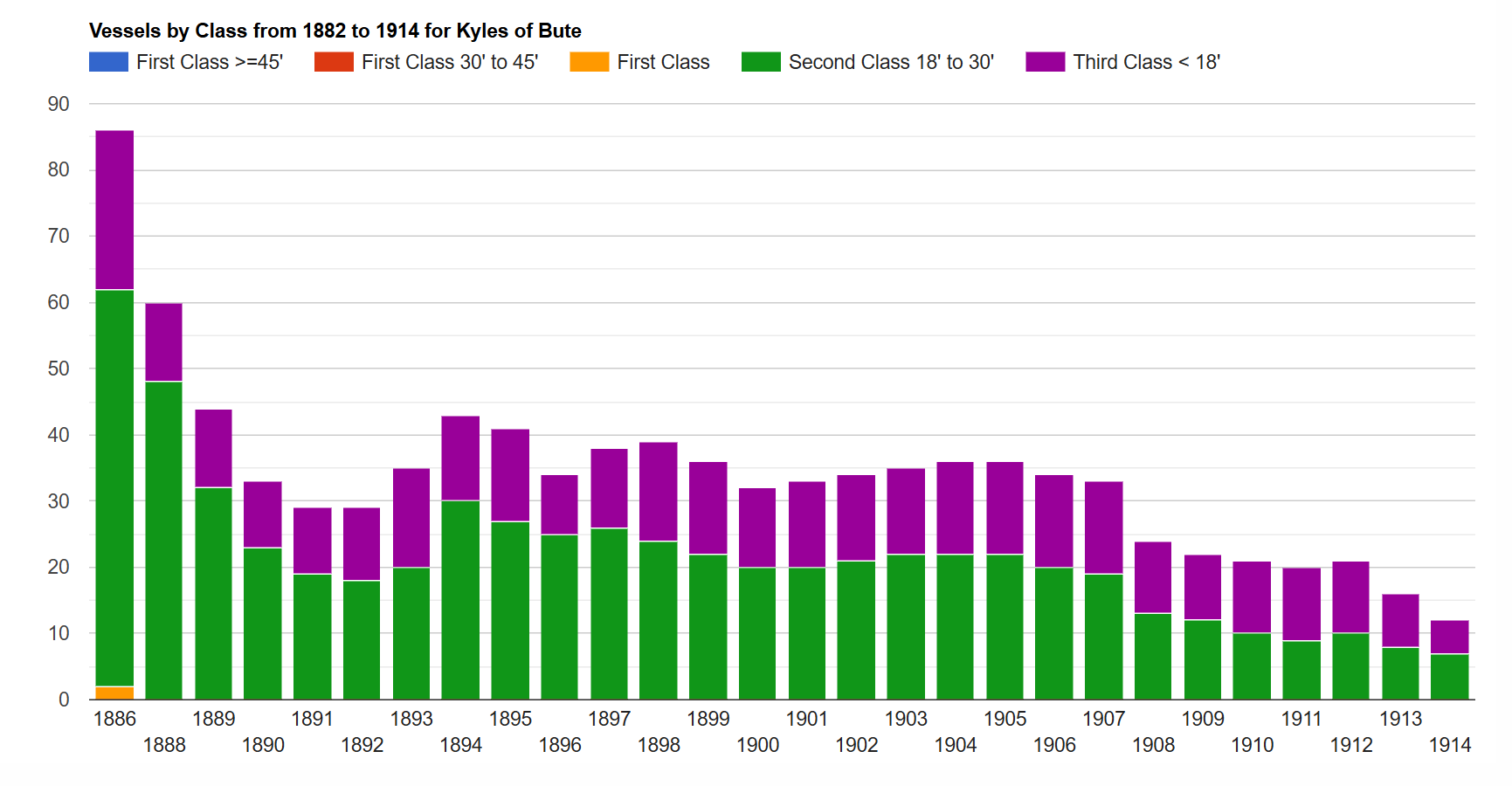
Vessels by class

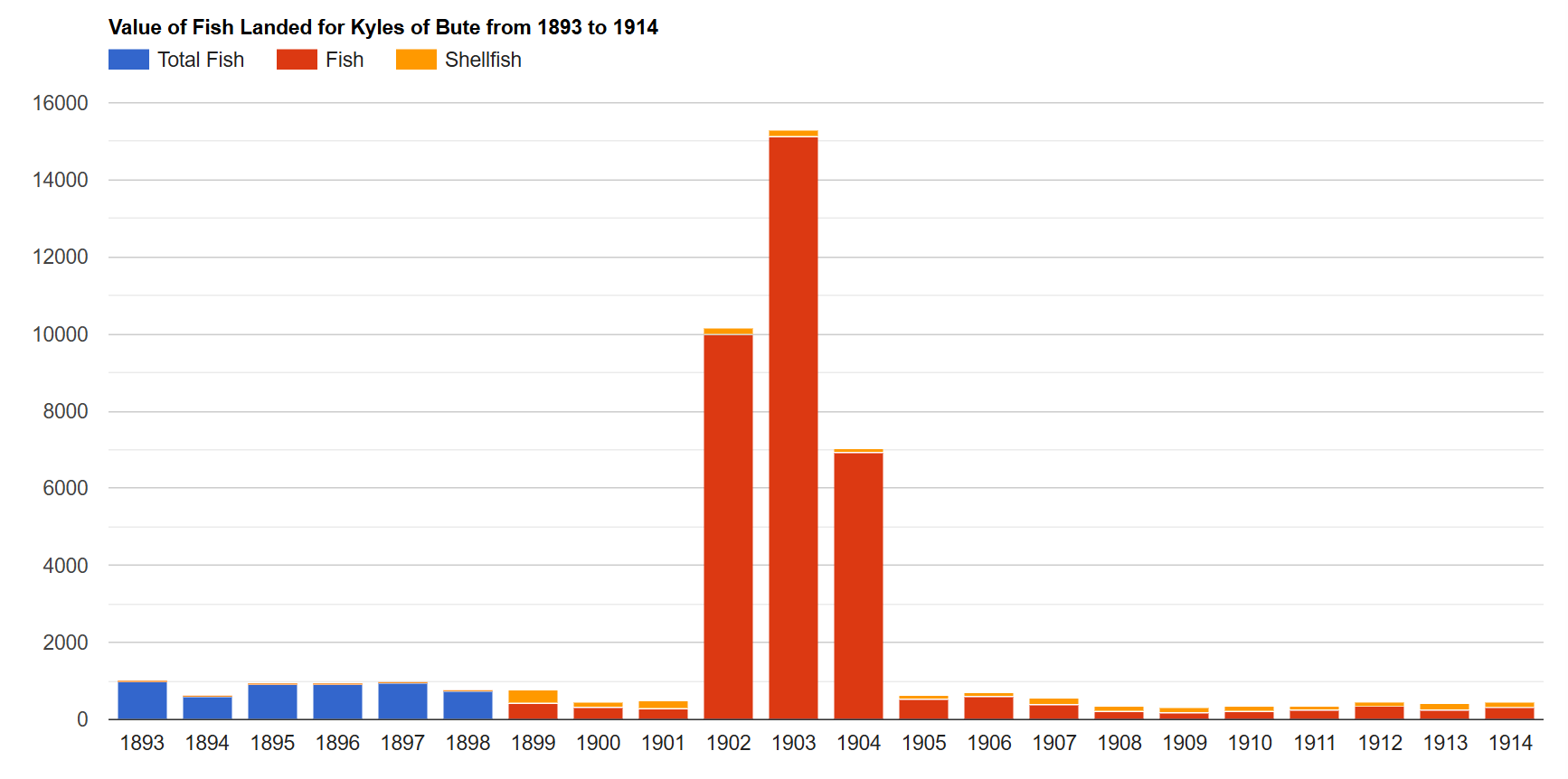
Value (£) of fish landed

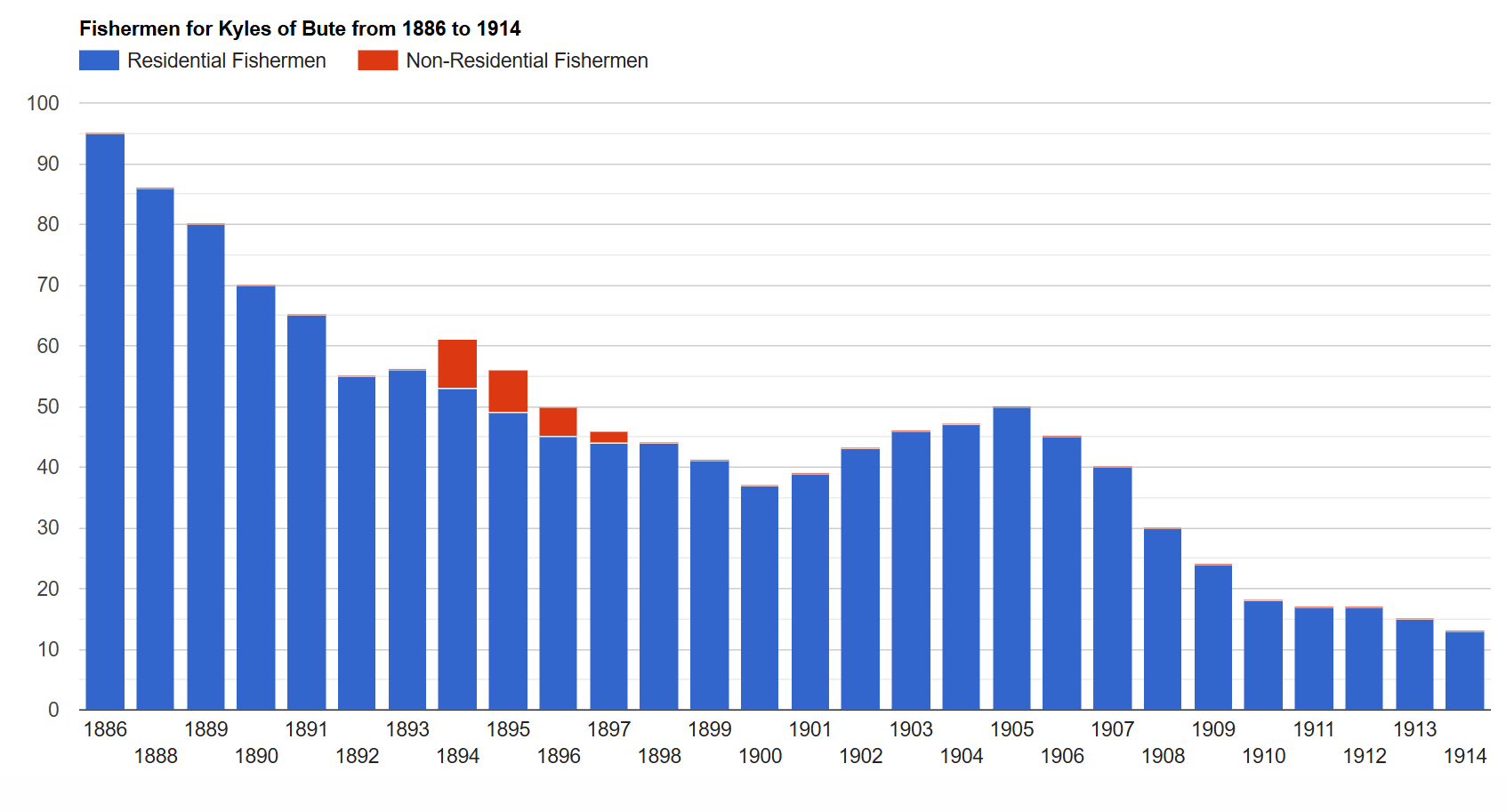
Fishermen

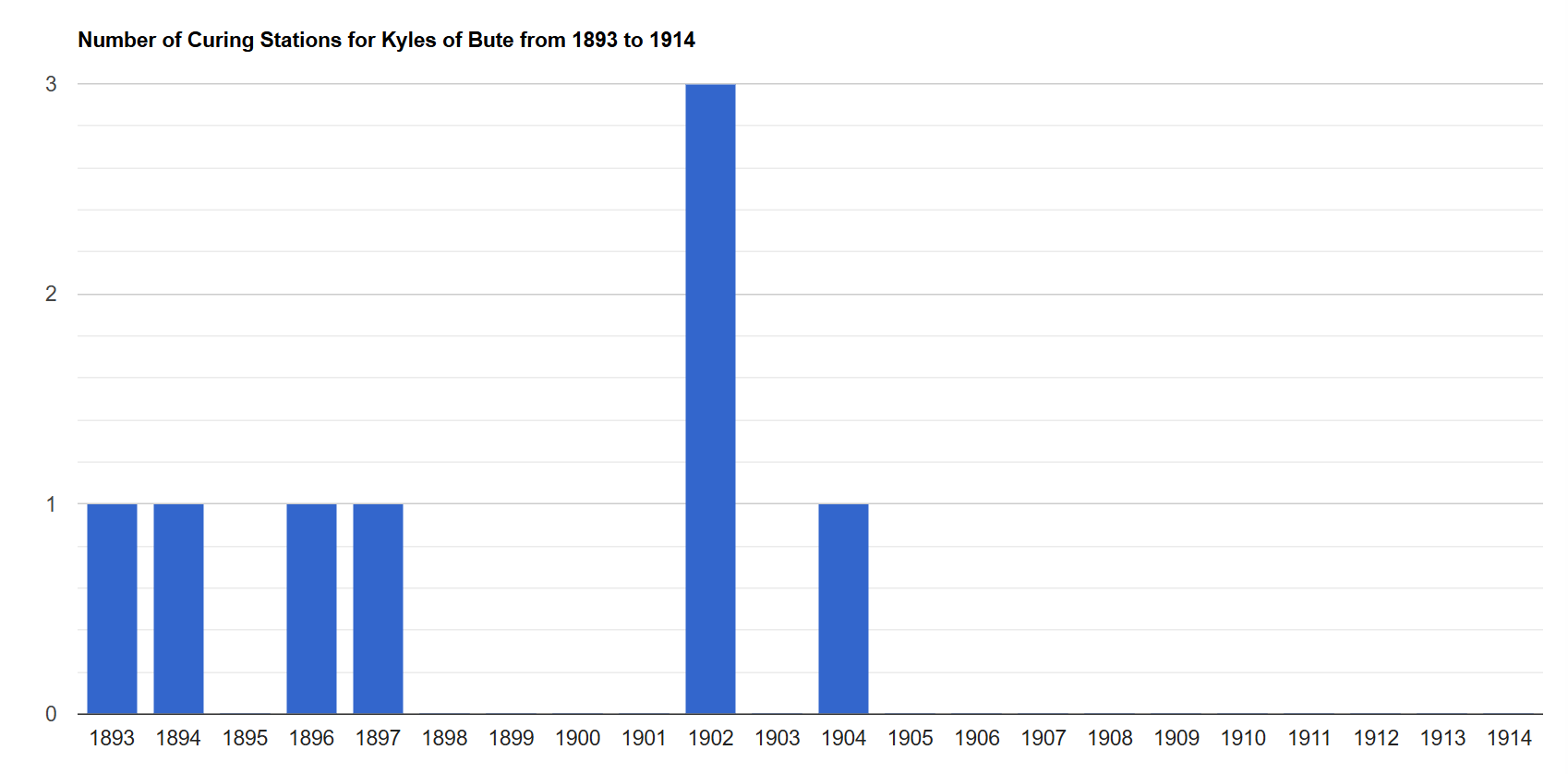
Number of curing stations

== Gallery ==
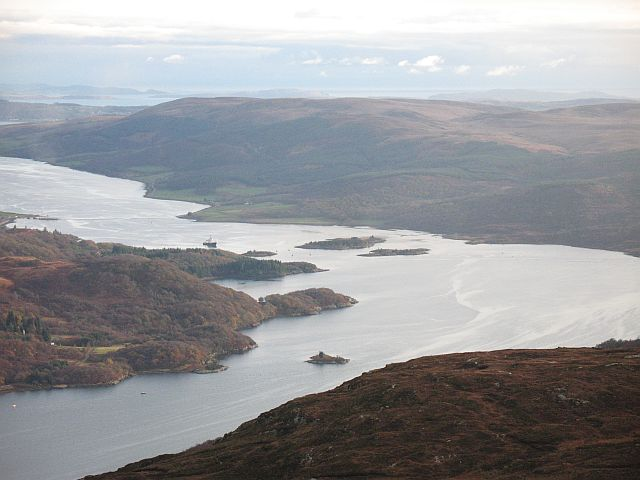
Kyles of Bute

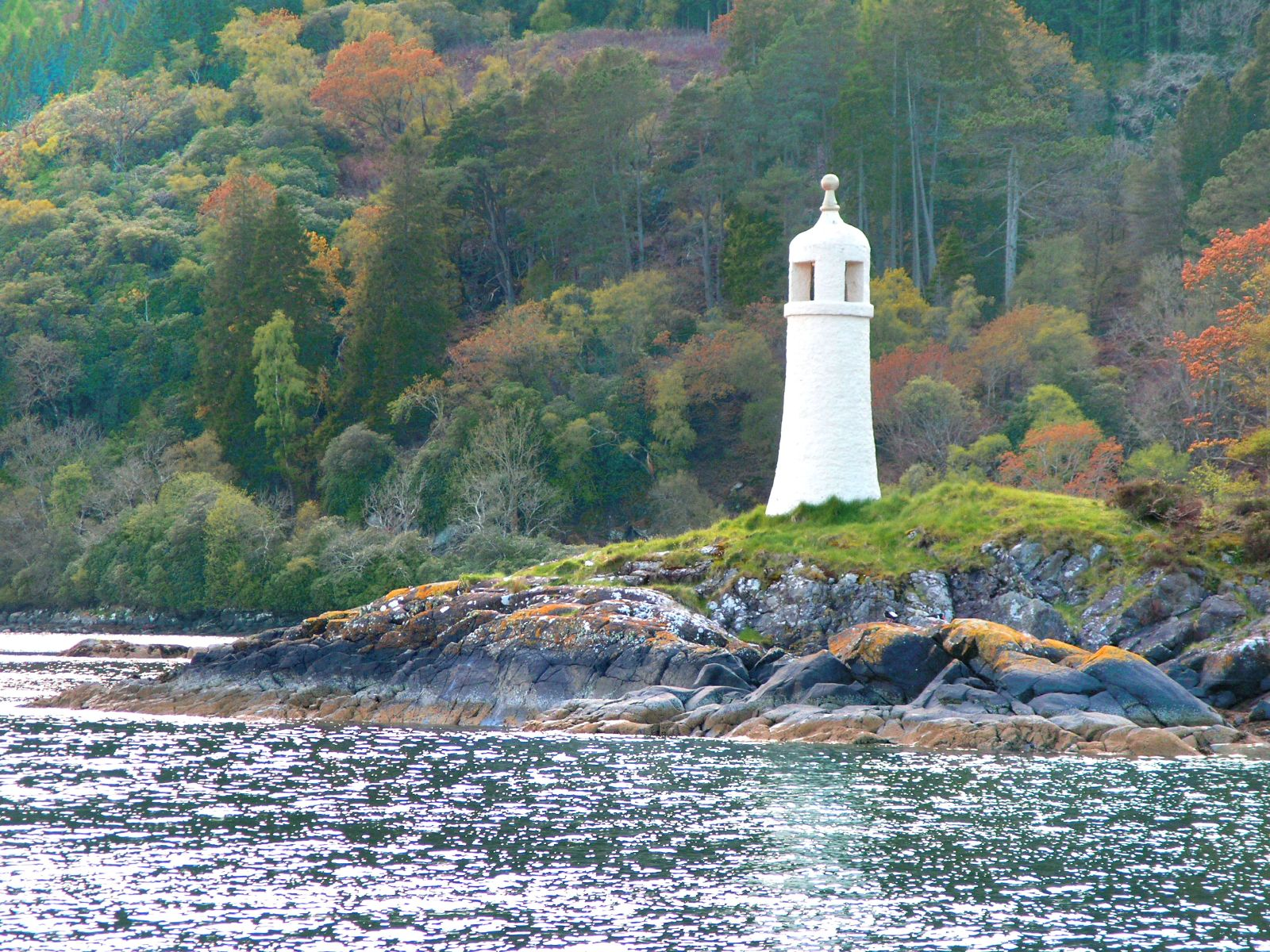
Caladh harbour light

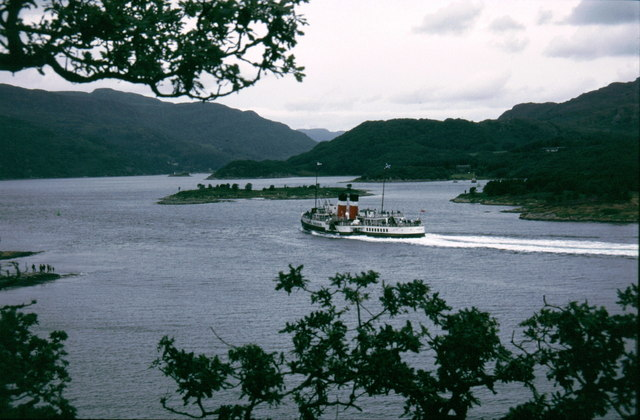
Burnt Islands Kyles of Bute

Admiralty Chart No 1906 Kyles of Bute and Inchmarnock Water
