= Loch Ruel =

Sea loch in Scotland

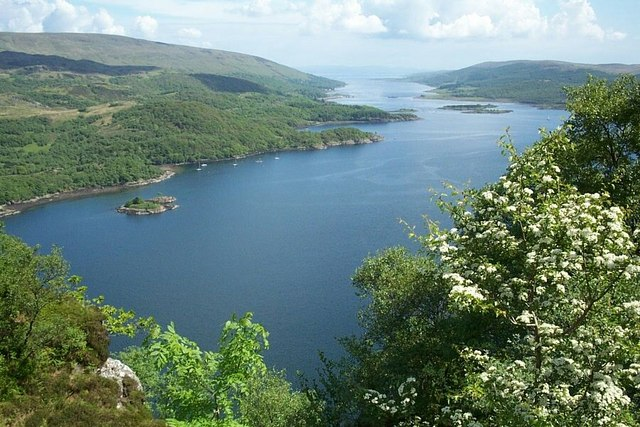
- The Loch and the Kyles of Bute

- Location within Argyll and Bute
- Location: Cowal, Argyll and Bute, Scotland.
- Coordinates: 55.947740°N 5.1947292°W, grid reference NS0061477355
- Type: Sea loch
- Basin countries: Scotland, United Kingdom
- Surface elevation: Sea Level
- Frozen: No

Loch Ruel or Loch Riddon; extends north from the Kyles of Bute and is a sea loch in Argyll and Bute, Scotland.

== See also ==
- River Ruel
- MV Loch Riddon - ferry operated by Caledonian MacBrayne
