= Eilean Dearg, Loch Ruel =

Island in Loch Ruel, Scotland

Coordinates: 55°56′42″N 5°11′28″W

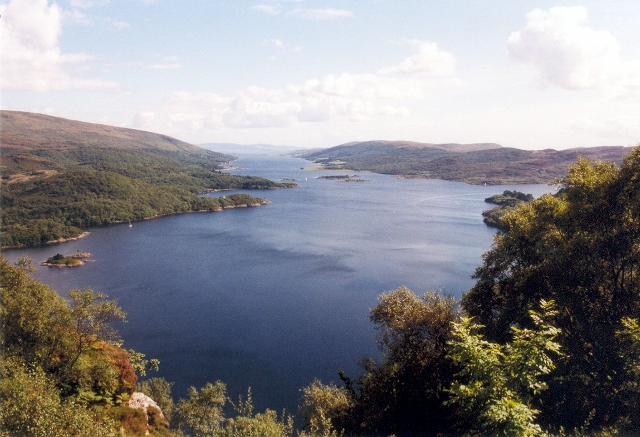
Loch Riddon (or Loch Ruel), with Eilean Dearg on the left hand side

Eilean Dearg is a small island in Loch Ruel (or Loch Riddon) in Argyll, Scotland. The island was once home to a castle, which was destroyed by naval action in Argyll's Rising in 1685. No visible remains of the castle are to be found, but archaeologists excavated the site between 1964 and 1967, finding the castle's hall, chapel, a tower and the foundations of the wall, along with a gate. The excavations also found vitrified rock, possibly indicating the island was once occupied by a vitrified fort.
