= Saddell Bay =

- Location: eastern side of the Kintyre Peninsula of Scotland
- Coordinates: 55°31.72′N 5°29.98′W
- Type: embayment

Saddell Bay is an embayment along the eastern side of the Kintyre Peninsula of Scotland. Saddell Bay is an element of Kilbrannan Sound that separates the Kintyre Peninsula from the Isle of Arran. Other bays along the east side of the Kintyre Peninsula include Kildonald Bay and Dippen Bay.

== Physical Description ==
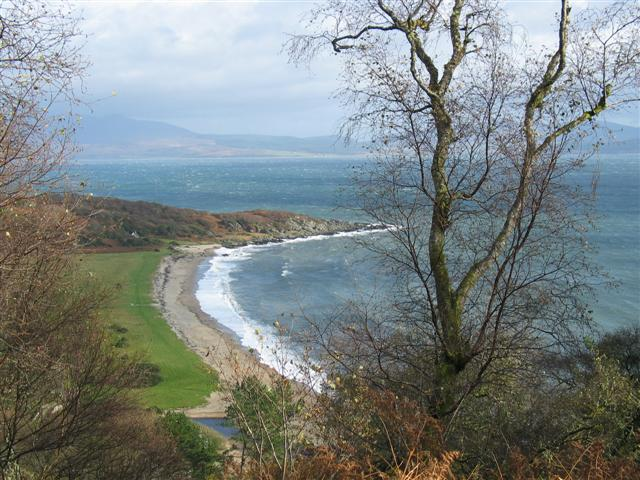
Saddell Bay, view from the SW

The bay is about 1 km in length, from Pluck Point in the NE to Port na Cuthaig in the SW. Saddell Water flows into the sea at the SW end of the bay. Between the mouth of the Saddell Water and Pluck Point is a sandy beach, backed by a storm beach, where boulders were thrown up over the beach by the waves, and which now appears as a grass-covered ridge that is higher than the glen behind.

== Buildings ==
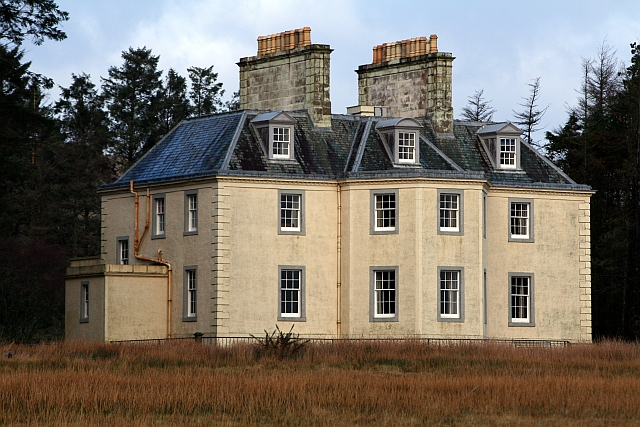
Saddell House

Saddell Castle is situated close to the beach on the west side of Saddell Water. Saddell House, dating from about 1774 is to the East of Saddell Water behind the storm beach ridge described above. Three smaller buildings are close to the shore to the SW of the castle, Shore Cottage, Ferryman's Cottage, and Cul na Shee. Saddell Lodge is by the gate where the drive leads from the B842 road down to the shore.

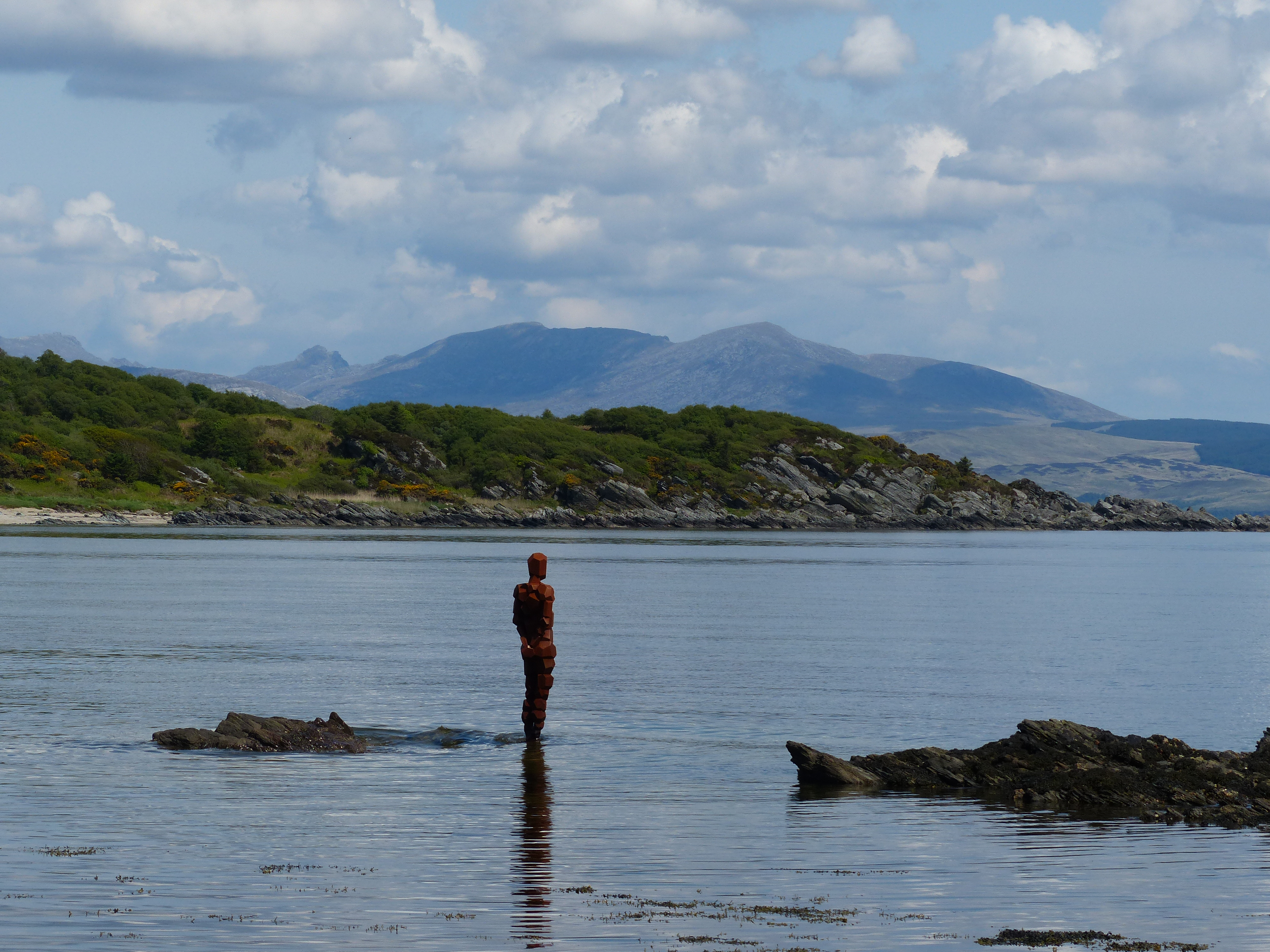
Gormley Land looking across the bay and Pluck Point to Arran

All of these buildings are owned by the Landmark Trust, which runs them as self-catering accommodation. In 2015, to commemorate the Trust's 50th anniversary, Antony Gormley was commissioned to provide five sculptures, four at cardinal points in Great Britain, and one central one. The northerly sculpture is at Saddell Bay, close to Shore Cottage, looking across the Kilbrannan Sound toward Arran. This sculpture is the only one of the five to be retained as a permanent fixture.

== In popular culture ==
Saddell bay was the location for the video of Paul McCartney and Wings' Mull of Kintyre with the Campbeltown Pipe Band.

== See also ==
- Saddell Abbey
