= Saddell =

Village in Argyll and Bute, Scotland

Coordinates: 55°31′53″N 5°30′40″W

Saddell: Scottish Gaelic: Saghadal
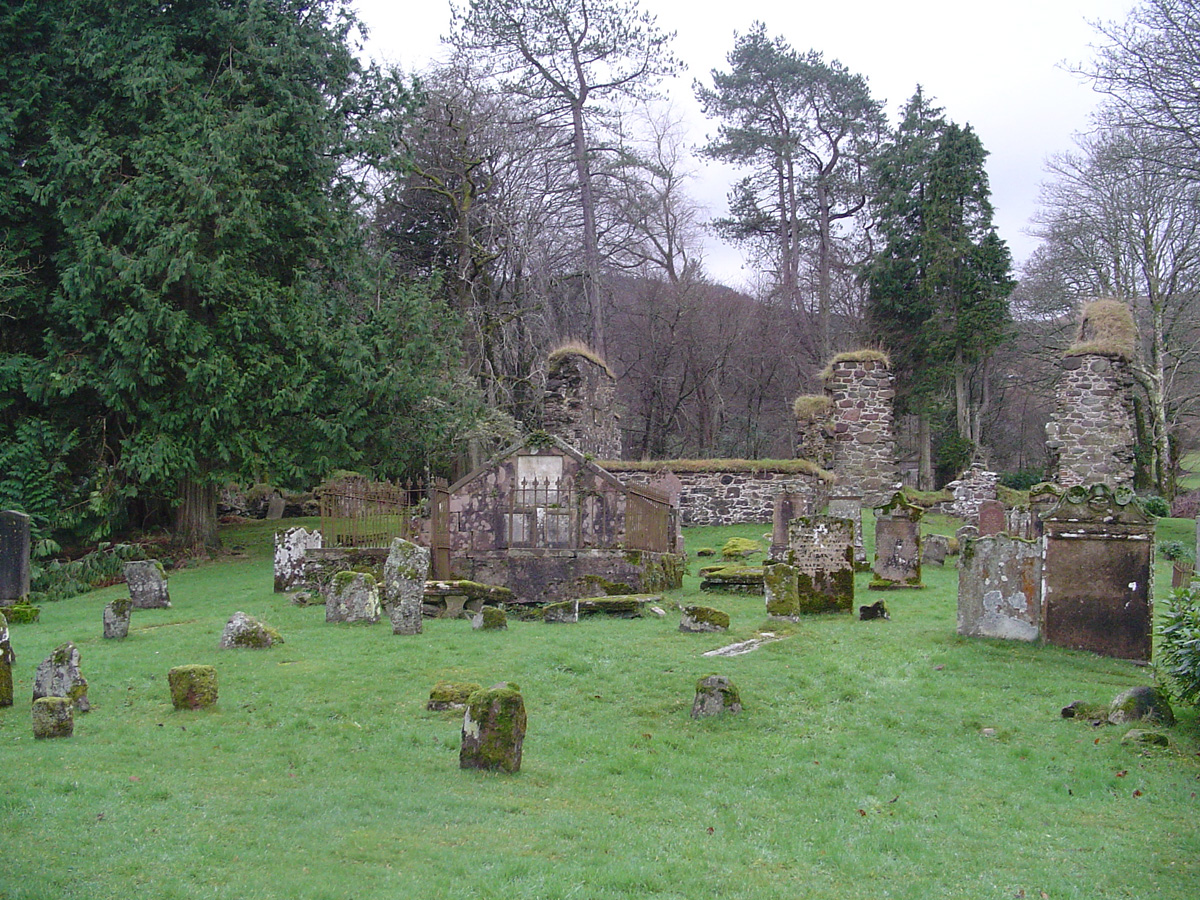
- Saddell Abbey

- Location within Argyll and Bute
- OS grid reference: NR785321
- Council area: Argyll and Bute
- Lieutenancy area: Argyll and Bute
- Country: Scotland
- Sovereign state: United Kingdom
- Post town: CAMPBELTOWN
- Postcode district: PA28
- Police: Scotland
- Fire: Scottish
- Ambulance: Scottish
- UK Parliament: Argyll, Bute and South Lochaber
- Scottish Parliament: Argyll and Bute

Designations

Scheduled monument
- Official name: Kildonan Dun
- Type: Prehistoric domestic and defensive: dun
- Designated: 11 October 1960
- Reference no.: SM243

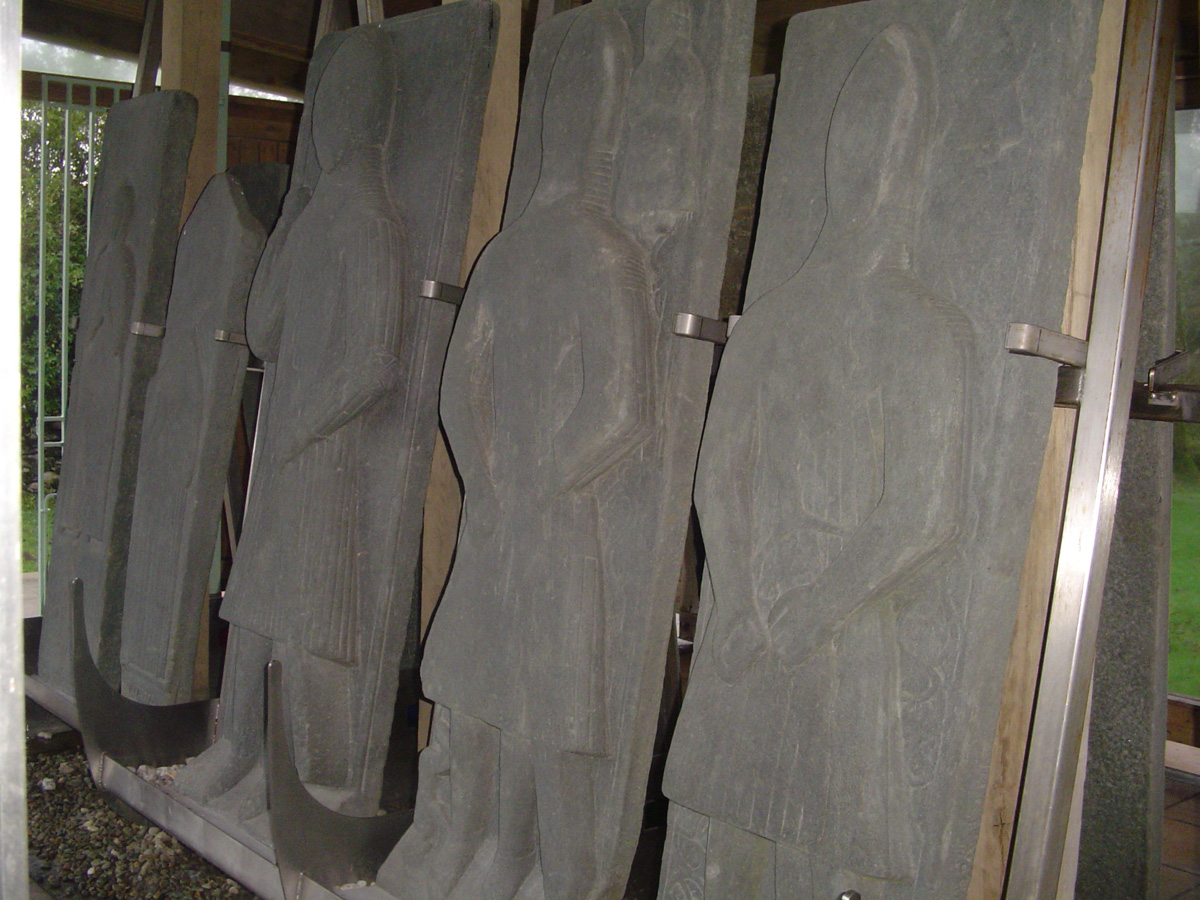
The Lords of the Isles stone figures at Saddell

Saddell (Scottish Gaelic: Saghadal, pronounced [ˈs̪a.ət̪əl̪ˠ]) is a small Scottish village situated on the east side of the Kintyre Peninsula of Argyll and Bute, overlooking the Kilbrannan Sound and the Isle of Arran, 8 miles (13 km) from Campbeltown on the B842 road to Carradale. The name Saddell is derived from the Norse for sandy dale.

== Saddell Abbey ==
Saddell is home to the ruins of a Cistercian Abbey. This was founded around 1160 by Somerled and completed by his son, whose descendants became the Clan MacDonald and eventual Lords of the Isles. Stone carving was a speciality at Saddell, and fine examples of carved medieval grave slabs are displayed under cover in the grounds of the abbey, now a cemetery. Relief carvings on the stones show warriors in their armour, clerics, ships, huntsmen with stags, large swords, and Celtic knotwork designs. Most were carved at Saddell Abbey, but some are more typical of the Iona school of stone-carving.

== Saddell Castle ==
Saddell Castle, a tower house 1/4 mile (400 m) to the southeast and nearer the shore, was built for the Bishop of Argyll in the early 16th century. When the Campbells took it over in the late 17th century, stone from the abbey was used to add farm buildings to the castle. The family moved into a new house nearby around 1774, and the castle deteriorated over the years before being bought by the Landmark Trust. In 1976, the Landmark Trust contracted Mr Robert R Mauchline to restore the castle to its former glory. Soon after its completion, the castle appeared in Paul McCartney's "Mull of Kintyre" music video. Mr Mauchline's daughters Joanna and Hazel were also featured in the video.

The Trust now owns both Saddell Castle and the newer Saddell House, allowing pedestrian access to the beach below Saddell Bay.

== Kildonan Dun ==
At the end of Saddell Bay is Pluck Wood and the remains of Kildonan Dun, a late Iron Age hillfort dating from 200BC and made from Stone.

In contrast to the mostly round Duns, it has a D-shaped ground plan, like Barsalloch Fort and Castle Haven in Galloway. The Dun measures about 19 m × 13 m (62 ft × 43 ft) within the outer two, one-meter high and two-meter thick ring wall. The impressive entrance, with its well-recognizable door construction, is in the southwest. The double staircase on the rampart, located within the wall on the west side, and a round wall niche in the northeast are intact. In form and design, some novelties are shown, as occurred with Brochs in the same period.

The excavation of Dun Kildonan between 1936 and 1938 resulted in a precise chronology. Objects from the 1st and 2nd centuries demonstrate the time of construction of the dun, while objects from the 6th and 9th to 12th centuries or later times show that the central square also remained an important focus. The finds are located in the Campbeltown Museum.

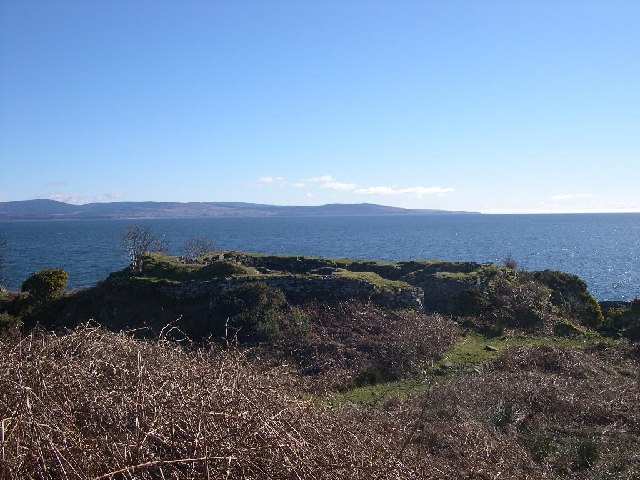
Kildonan Dun

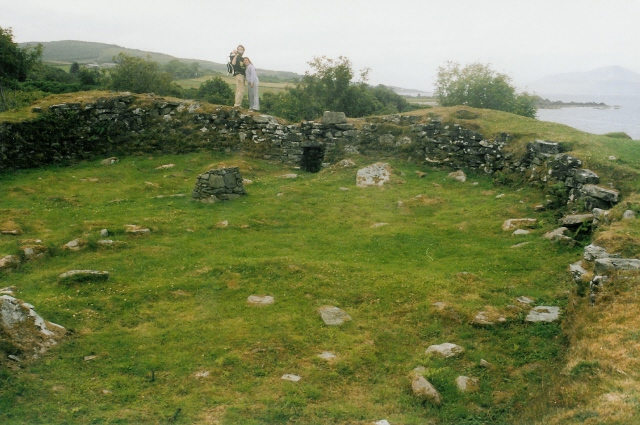
Interior of Kildonan Dun

== See also ==
- Dippen Bay
- Kildonald Bay
- Saddell Bay
