= Carradale =

Village in Argyll and Bute, Scotland

Coordinates: 55.591°N 5.470°W

Carradale: Scottish Gaelic: Càradal
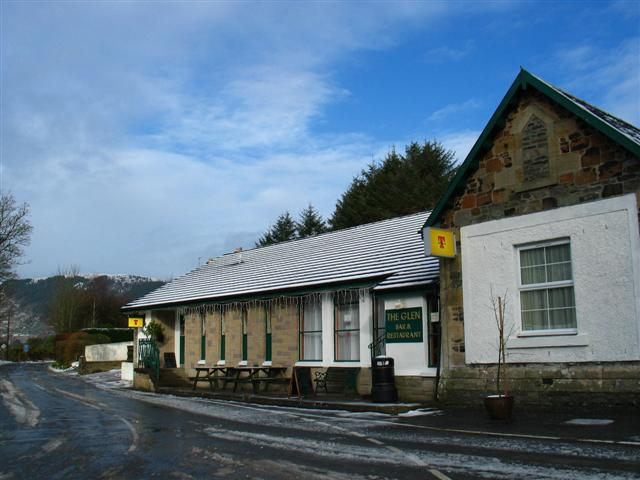
- Glen Bar and Restaurant

- Location within Argyll and Bute
- Population: 578 (2021)
- OS grid reference: NR814383
- Council area: Argyll and Bute
- Country: Scotland
- Sovereign state: United Kingdom
- Post town: CAMPBELTOWN
- Postcode district: PA28
- Police: Scotland
- Fire: Scottish
- Ambulance: Scottish
- UK Parliament: Argyll, Bute and South Lochaber
- Scottish Parliament: Argyll and Bute

Carradale (Scottish Gaelic: Càradal, pronounced [ˈkʰaːrˠət̪əl̪ˠ]) is a village on the east side of the Kintyre Peninsula, overlooking the Kilbrannan Sound and the west coast of the Isle of Arran in the Firth of Clyde, approximately 16 miles (26 kilometres) from Campbeltown. To the north of Carradale is the coastal peak known as Torr Mor; nearby are the hamlet of Dippen and Dippen Bay. Population: 577 ~ 2024

== History ==
There is a vitrified Iron Age fort at Carradale Point.

In the 17th and 18th centuries there were small communities of crofters and fishermen working in and around Carradale. The introduction of steam ships transformed Kintyre and from the 1830s until the Second World War daily steamers went from Campbeltown to Glasgow, calling at Carradale.

With the herring industry thriving, Carradale's first pier was built in 1858, developing and encouraging the holiday trade. This situation persisted until the Second World War, with hotels developing and a tradition of families returning year after year. Now this situation is reversing again. Carradale still has a fishing fleet, largely dealing in shellfish. Since the 1950s, forestry has also played an important part in the village with large scale afforestation taking place.

The Free Church was opened on 2 December 1887.

The novelist and poet Naomi Mitchison lived in Carradale House from 1938 until her death in 1999.

Suffragette Flora Drummond, who was raised on Arran, lived in Carradale from 1944 until her death in 1949.

== Segments of the village ==
The village has five main areas:

- Carradale Village, situated at a crossroads formed by the junction of the B842 and B879 roads.
- Carradale Bay, site of a large caravan park overlooking an expanse of white sand.
- Carradale Harbour (and the surrounding area), situated at the end of the B879.
- Port Righ Bay, overlooking a small sheltered beach.
- Waterfoot, at the mouth of the Carradale River.

== Transport ==
The only public transport available to Carradale is a bus service operated by West Coast Motors, to and from Campbeltown via Peninver, and Saddell.

== Pictures ==
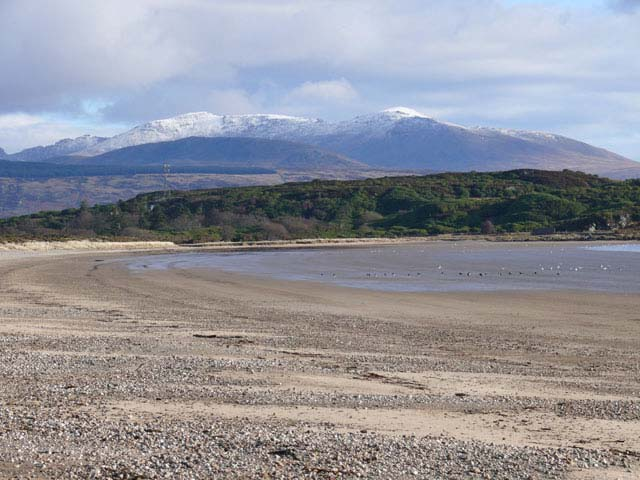
Carradale Beach with the snow-capped hills of the Isle of Arran in the distance.

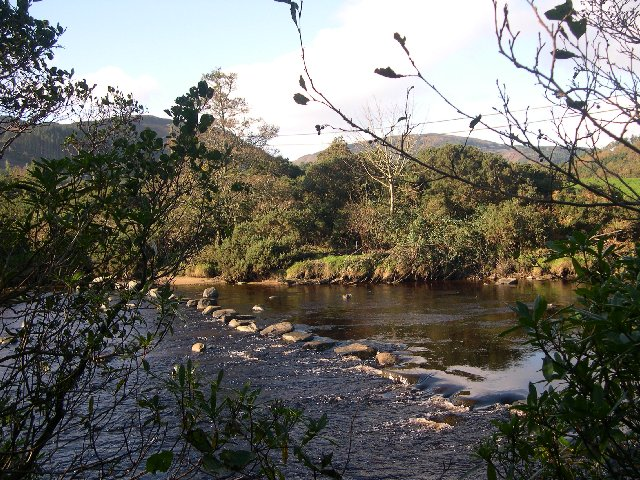
Stepping stones across the River Carra.

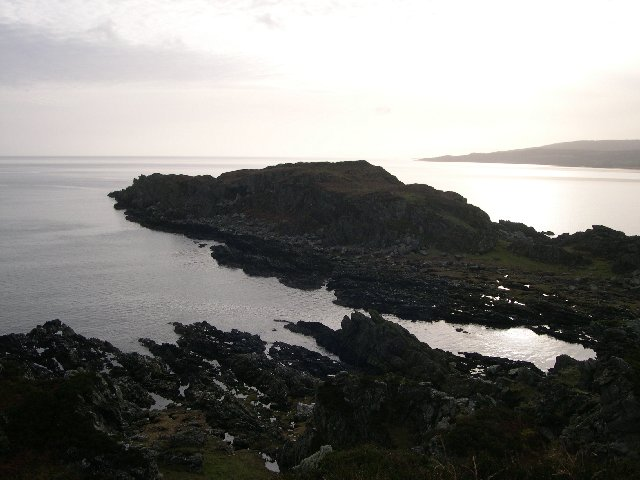
Carradale Point.

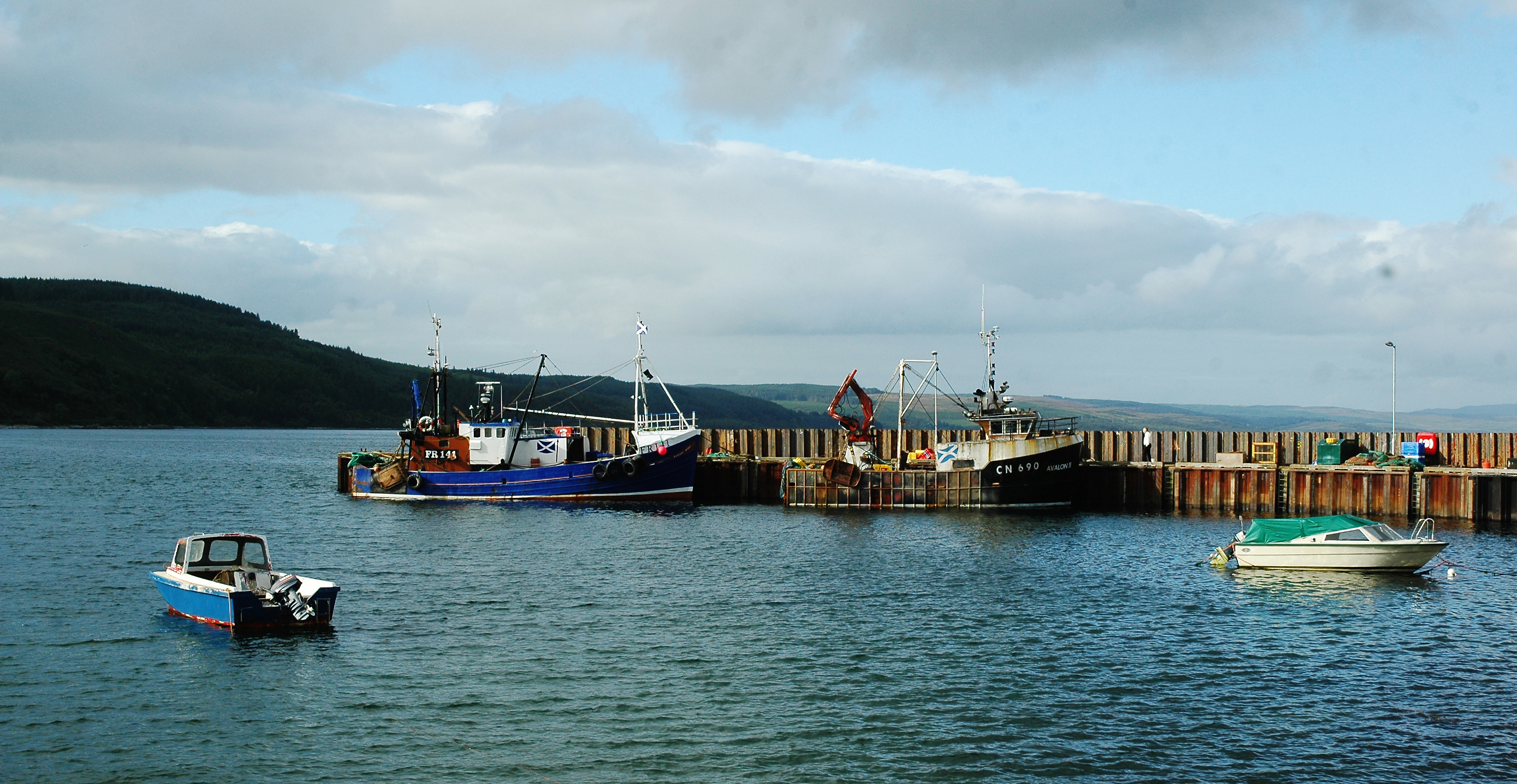
Carradale Harbour
