= Dippen =

Dippen may refer to the following places in Scotland:

- Dippen, Argyll, a village on the Kintyre Peninsula
  - Dippen Bay, a coastal water feature on the east of the Kintyre Peninsula
- Dippen, Arran, a village on the Isle of Arran, North Ayrshire
