= Torr Mor =

Coordinates: 55.601884°N 5.478184°W

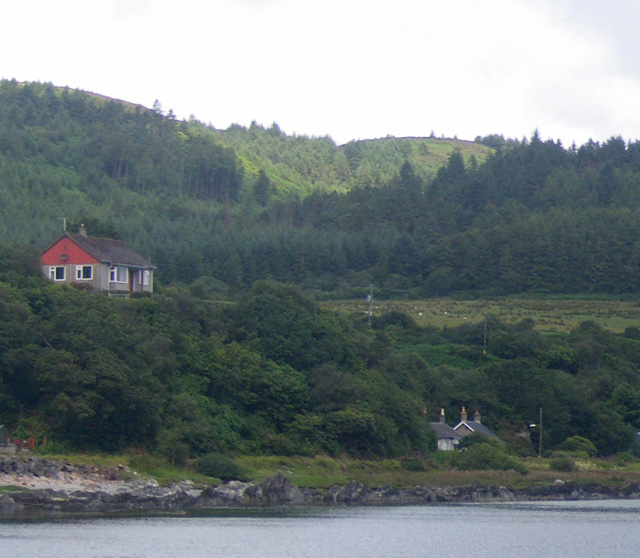
Western slopes of Torr Mor

Torr Mor is a hill peak landform on the coastal east side of the Kintyre Peninsula in Scotland. The peak offers views over the Kilbrannan Sound. The Forestry Commission maintain a footpath over the hill.

== See also ==
- Kildonald Bay
