= Saddell Abbey =

Abbey in Argyll and Bute, Scotland

Coordinates: 55°31′53″N 5°30′40″W

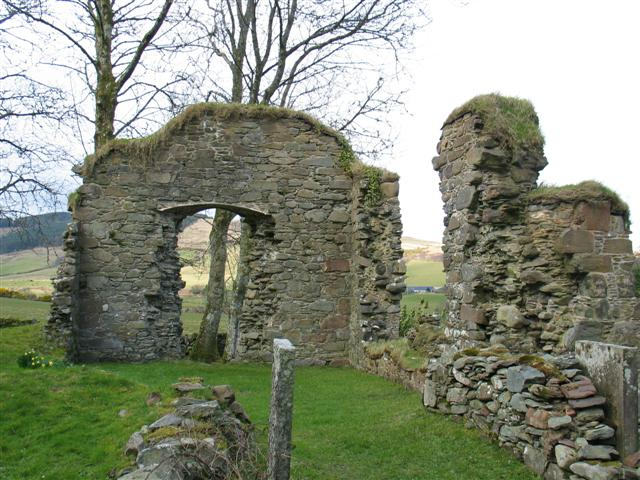

Monastery information
- Order: Cistercian
- Established: 12th century
- Disestablished: 1507
- Mother house: Mellifont Abbey
- Diocese: Diocese of Argyll
- Controlled churches: Inchmarnock; Kilchattan; Kilkivan

People
- Founders: Somerled, Ragnall mac Somairle

Saddell Abbey is a ruined Cistercian monastery located in western Scotland. The abbey was established in 1160 by Somerled, Lord of Kintyre, who was killed in 1164. The abbey was completed by his son, Ragnall, a few years later. The original layout of the abbey included a church and three adjoining buildings grouped around a cloister. Saddell Abbey is widely known for its important collection of life-sized stone carvings and burial slabs that were constructed from the 14th to the 16th centuries. Historic Environment Scotland established the site as a scheduled monument in 1975.

== Location ==
Saddell Abbey is located eight miles north of Campbeltown, on the east coast of Kintyre, Scotland. The building ruins sit on a bluff overlooking "the confluence of Saddell Water and Allt nam Manach", (Water of the Monks). To get to the site, take the B842 up the coast from Campbeltown toward Carradale to the small village of Saddell. A signpost gives directions to the car park for Saddell Abbey.

== Description ==
Saddell Abbey originally consisted of a church and three adjoining buildings grouped around a cloister. The church consisted of an aisleless nave and choir and north and south transepts laid out in the cruciform style. The northern transept of the church is thought to have been reconstructed in the 13th century and the chancel was probably remodeled at a later date. The abbey was abandoned by the late 15th century. Most of the buildings survived until the 16th century when they were dismantled and used elsewhere on the Saddell Castle estate.

Little remains of the original abbey structures. An assemblage of stone walls surrounded by a burial ground represent the north transept and nave of the original church. Still standing is a section of low stone walls which originally was part of the refectory and undercroft. The masonry that survives was constructed out of random rubble laid in lime mortar. There is a holy well at the site with an early 19th century stone drinking basin embellished with a Latin cross.

Saddell Abbey is widely known for its important collection of life-sized stone carvings and burial slabs. Several of the 14th to 16th century stone carvings, including a cross, six grave slabs and five effigies, are on display under a special shelter at the entrance to the abbey site. Other slabs are located outside the ruined walls of the church, and include several late 17th century recumbent stones. It is believed that the effigies were constructed on the island of Iona and brought to the abbey, while the remaining carvings were made by skilled stone craftsmen on site.

== History ==
The abbey was established as a House of Cistercian Monks by Norse nobleman, Somerled, Lord of Kintyre. The abbey was dedicated to the Virgin Mary. Somerled established the abbey in 1160, but was killed in 1164 in the Battle of Renfrew. Somerled's son, Ragnall, succeeded his father as Lordy of Kintyre and completed the construction of the abbey. He is also referred to as the abbey's founder. The abbey was abandoned around 1470 when James IV of Scotland forfeited the Lordship of the Isles and its lands to the Bishopric of Argyll. Somerled's descendants, the MacDonalds, Lords of the Isles, continued to be patrons of Saddell abbey for many years.

Historic Environment Scotland established the site as a scheduled monument in 1975.

== See also ==
- Abbot of Saddell
- Kildonald Bay
- Saddell Castle

== Bibliography ==
- Ian B. Cowan and David E. Easson, Medieval Religious Houses: Scotland With an Appendix on the Houses in the Isle of Man, Second Edition, (London, 1976), pp. 77–8
- D.E.R. Watt and N.F. Shead, (eds.), The Heads of Religious Houses in Scotland from the 12th to the 16th Centuries, The Scottish Records Society, New Series, Volume 24, (Edinburgh, 2001), pp. 186–7
