= Eastbury Park, Northwood =

Coordinates: 51.6204°N 0.4116°W

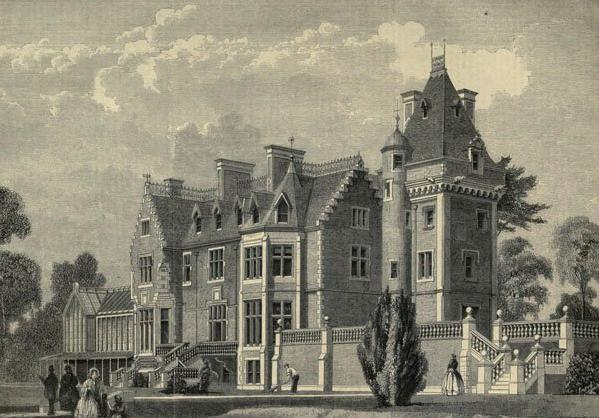
Eastbury Park, Northwood

Eastbury Park was an estate in Eastbury near Northwood, London.

== History ==
The house was designed by David Bryce and built by a Mr Harding in the Scottish Baronial style for David Carnegie. Completed in 1857, the house was sold to Frank Carew in 1887 and then sold on to the Royal Air Force for use as an officers' mess for RAF Coastal Command in 1938. It burnt down in 1969.
