= Carradale House, Argyll and Bute =

Carradale House
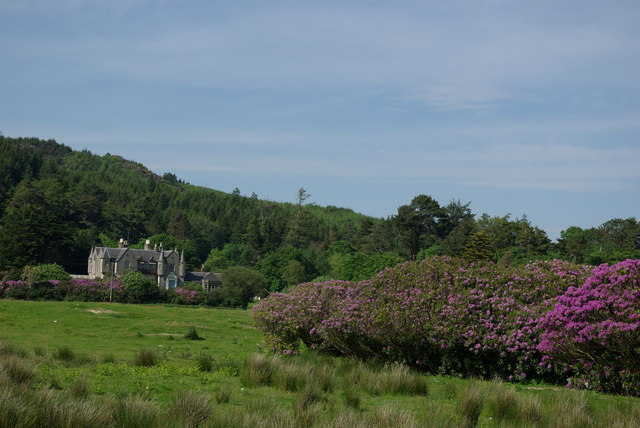
- Carradale House

General information
- Architectural style: Scottish baronial architecture
- Location: Carradale, Argyll and Bute, Scotland
- Coordinates: 55°35′03″N 5°28′53″W
- Construction started: 1844
- Client: Richard Campbell

Design and construction
- Architects: David Bryce and William Burn

Listed Building – Category B
- Designated: 20 July 1971
- Reference no.: LB18394

Carradale House is a Grade B listed mansion house near Carradale, Argyll and Bute, Scotland. Constructed in the 17th century, the house was extended in 1844 for Richard Campbell and designed by David Bryce and William Burn.

In 1861 Colonel David Carrick Robert Carrick-Buchanan JP DL KCB (1825–1904) of the Buchanans of Drumpellier, Lanarkshire acquired the estate.

On 18 November 1869 the Edinburgh Evening Courant reported that:

An Eye-Witness writes:- About forty years ago, a whale came on shore on the coast of Kintyre, at a small bay near Carradale, measuring 94 feet long. The jawbones now form a gateway at Carradale House, so high that I think a moderately-heaped hay-cart could easily pass through, though the bones are stuck in the ground sufficiently far to support them. Carradale then belonged, oddly enough, to Mr Campbell, a cousin to the Earl of Wemyss.

The estate came up for sale in 1935 when it was described as follows:

Carradale is situated in Kintyre, on the shores of the Kilbrannan Sound, 15 miles from Campbeltown. The lands are among the most important in the county extending to 15,000 acres and including ten farms, the village of Carradale, pier, 63 small houses and shops and yacht anchorage, &c. Carradale House is a comfortable moderate-sized residence. The gardens are noted for their display of rhodedendrons. Both banks of the whole of the Carradale River are included in the translation. There are salmon and sea trout, netting rights, and excellent pheasant, grouse, black game, woodcock and snipe shooting. In addition there are large rabbit warrens…. Estate feu-duties of over £256 per annum secured on modern cottage property, and there are also valuable feuing sites available without interfering with the amenity of the estate. The annual rental is £2,517 [(equivalent to £154,800 in 2025),] with small burdens.

Dick Mitchison, Baron Mitchison and his wife Naomi Mitchison bought the house in 1938 and she lived there until her death in 1999.

A fire in October 1947 at the house destroyed the electricity generating plant which supplied the house, estate cottages, and the village hall. A second fire in 1969 destroyed the courtyard to the north of the house. This was later rebuilt.
