= Abbot of Saddell =

The Abbot of Saddell was the head of the Cistercian monastic community of Saddell Abbey, in Argyll, Scotland. Few abbots are known by name, and although the abbey was founded in 1207, it is not until his death on 12 July 1393 that Abbot Patrick becomes the first abbot known by name. The following is a list of known abbots:

- Patrick, fl. x 1393
- Macratius, fl. 1393
- Alexander Angussi Goffredi, fl. 1433
- Cristin MacOlchallum, fl. 1456
- Nigel Machayn, fl. 1456
- Alexander Macalexander, fl. 1499

== See also ==
- Saddell Abbey

== Bibliography ==
- Watt, D.E.R. & Shead, N.F. (eds.), The Heads of Religious Houses in Scotland from the 12th to the 16th Centuries, The Scottish Records Society, New Series, Volume 24, (Edinburgh, 2001), pp. 186–7
