= David Bryce =

Scottish architect (1803 - 1876)

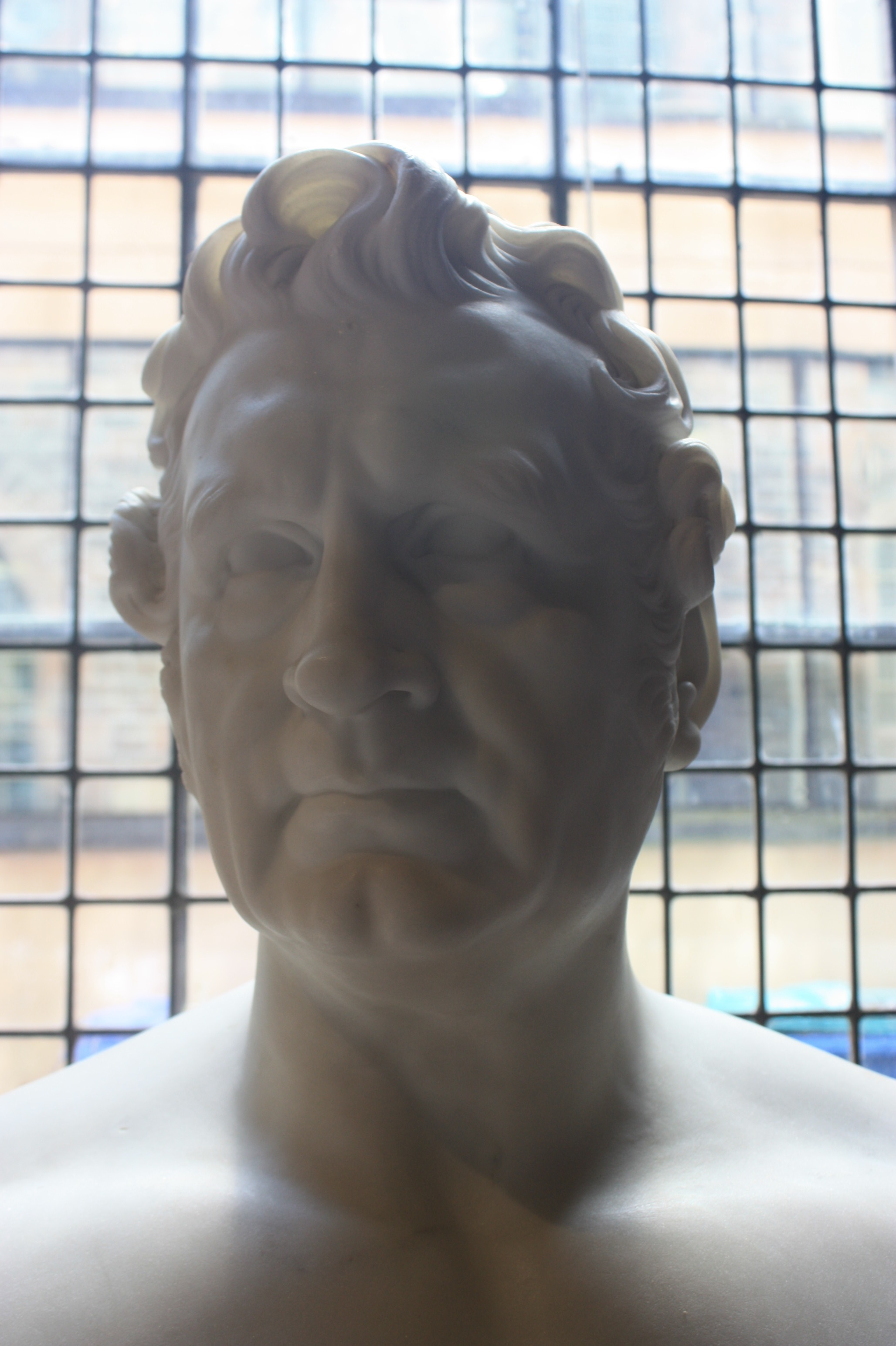
David Bryce by George MacCallum 1868 Scottish National Portrait Gallery

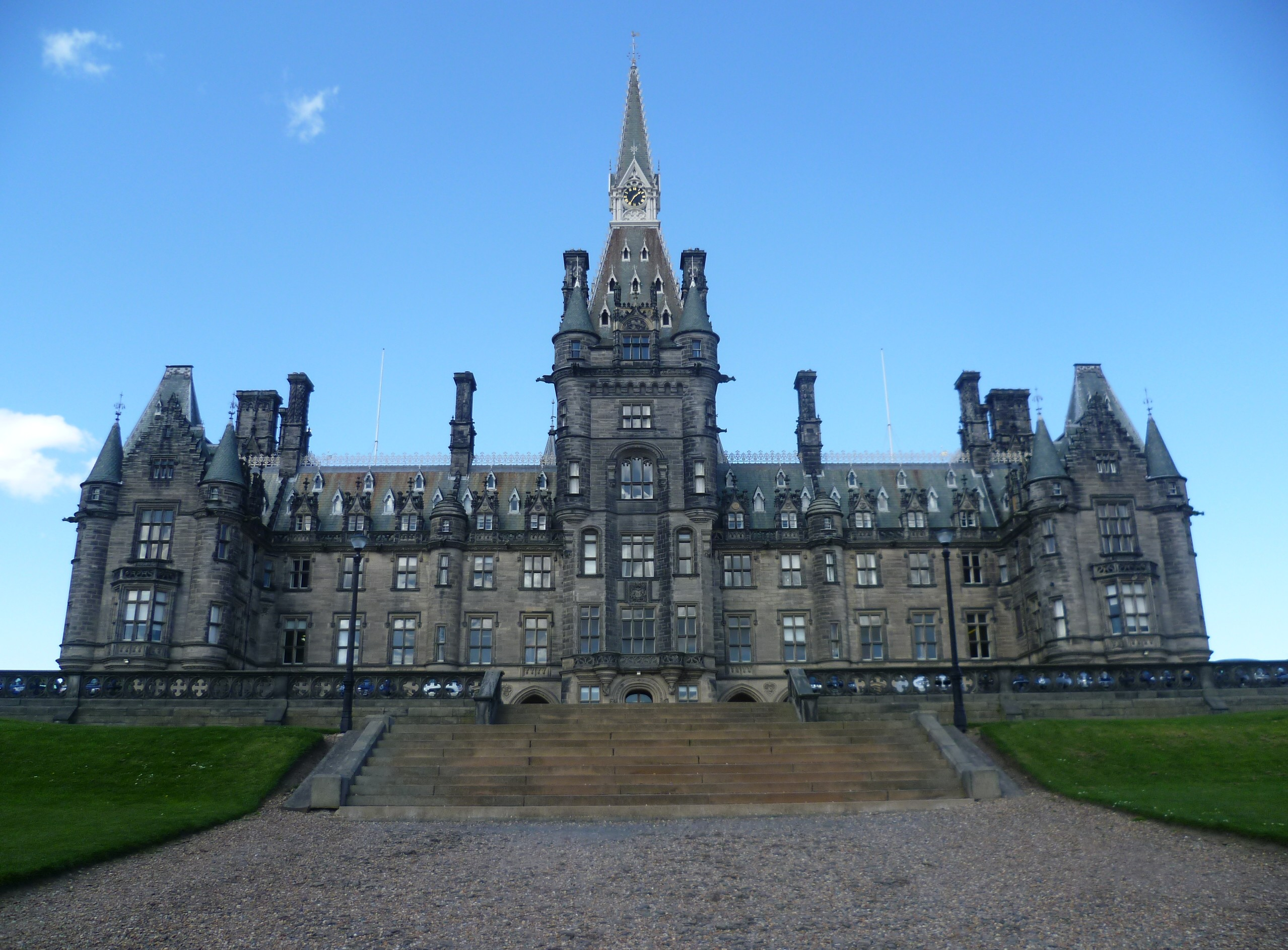
Fettes College main building

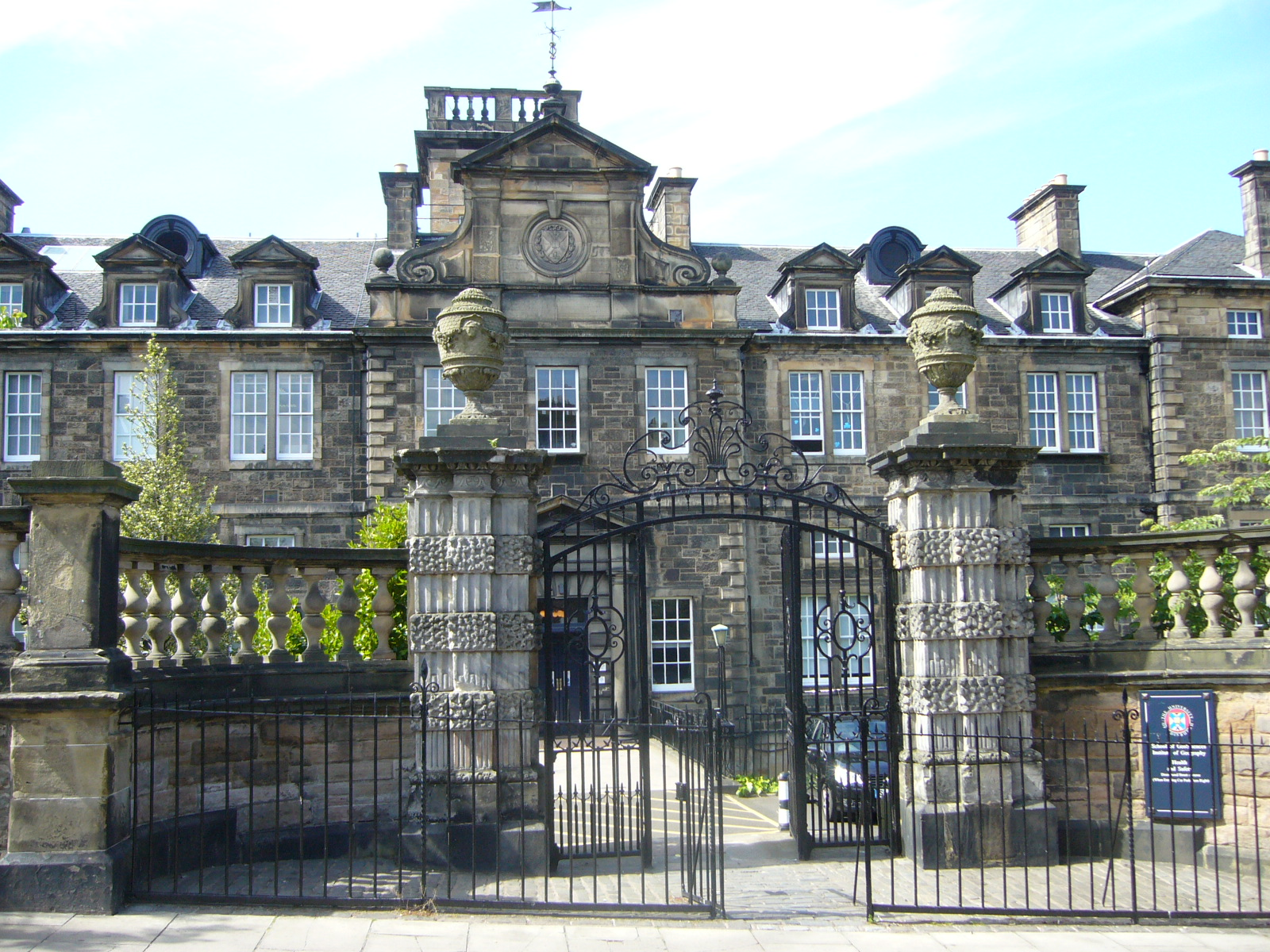
Surgical Hospital, Edinburgh 1853

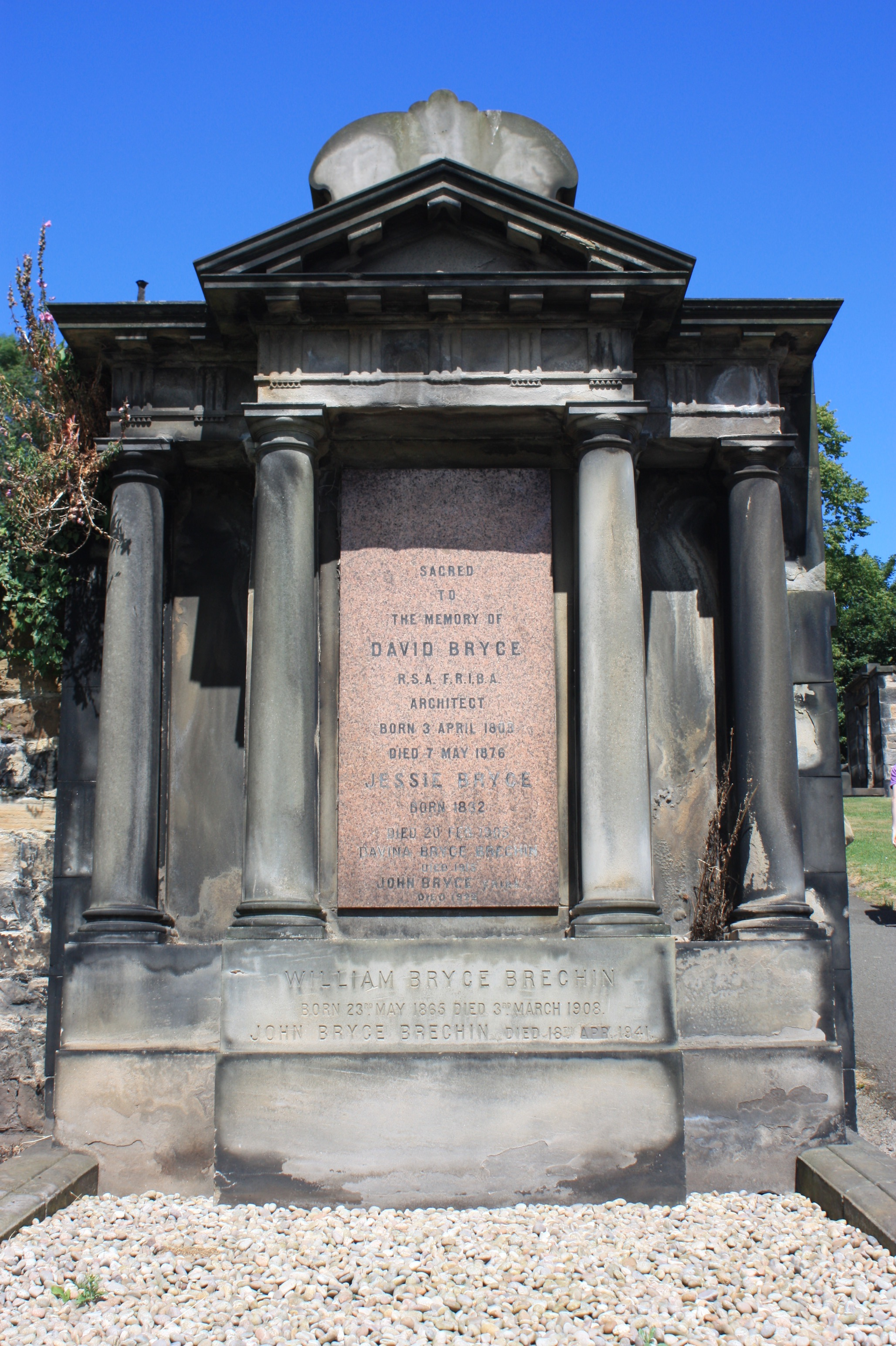
David Bryce's grave

David Bryce FRSE FRIBA RSA (3 April 1803 – 7 May 1876) was a Scottish architect.

== Life ==
Bryce was born at 5 South College Street in Edinburgh, the son of David Bryce (1763–1816), a grocer with a successful side interest in building. He was educated at the Royal High School and joined the office of the architect William Burn in 1825, at the age of 22. By 1841, Bryce had risen to be Burn's partner. Burn and Bryce formally dissolved their partnership in 1845, with disputes over the building of St Mary's Church, Dalkeith, Midlothian, for the Duke of Buccleuch.

Burn moved to London, and Bryce succeeded to a very large and increasing practice, to which he devoted himself. In the course of his career, which was actively continued almost down to his death, he attained the foremost place in his profession in Scotland, and designed important works in most of the principal towns of the country.

In the 1830s Bryce was living at 8 Great Stuart Street on the Moray Estate in Edinburgh's West End.

In 1835 he was elected an associate of the Royal Scottish Academy, and in the following year became an academician. He was also a fellow of the Royal Institute of British Architects, of the Architectural Institute of Scotland, of the Royal Society of Edinburgh, and officiated for several years as grand architect to the Grand Lodge of Masons in Scotland. He died on 7 May 1876, after a short illness from bronchitis, leaving many important works in progress, which were completed under the superintendence of his nephew, who had been his partner for some years, and who succeeded to his business. He died unmarried, but had one son with his common law wife, Janet Tod (1797-1884), David Bryce Tod, whom he recognised in later life, and in his will.

He is buried in the New Calton Cemetery in Edinburgh just west of the main north-south path, beside his nephew, John Bryce, also an architect, who worked with him in later life.

== Freemasonry ==
Bryce was Initiated into Scottish Freemasonry in Lodge Roman Eagle, No. 160, (Edinburgh). He later became an Affiliate Member of Lodge St James Operative, No.97, also in Edinburgh. He served, jointly, as Grand Architect of the Grand Lodge of Antient Free and Accepted Masons of Scotland, with his mentor, William Burn, from 1845 to 1850 and alone from 1851 until his death. He also took an interest in another branch of Freemasonry known as the Royal Arch. He was Exalted (initiated) in Edinburgh St Andrew Chapter, No.83.

== Assessment ==
Bryce worked in all styles, and at first chiefly in the so-called Palladian and Italian Renaissance, but he soon devoted himself more exclusively to the Gothic, particularly that variety of it known as Scottish Baronial, of which he became the most distinguished and the ablest exponent. It was in this style that his greatest successes were achieved, particularly in the erection and alteration of mansion houses throughout the country, of which at least fifty testify to his sound judgement in planning, and to his appreciation of its opportunities for picturesque effects.

The best of his public buildings in this style are probably Fettes College and the Royal Infirmary in Edinburgh; while the buildings of the Bank of Scotland, which so largely contribute to the beauty of the outline of the Old Town of Edinburgh, exhibit him at his best in the Italian style. The North perspective view for the Bank of Scotland was drawn in 1863, in which the front would be refurbished in a Baroque style, adorned with Corinthian columns and allegorical statues, wings with lanterns would be added, and the central dome would be made taller in Florentine style, topped with a golden statue of Fame.

His fame is, however, mainly due to his ability in reviving the picturesque French Gothic, now naturalised in Scotland under the name of Baronial; the annual report of the Royal Scottish Academy in the year of his death said "there is no doubt that his name will long be honourably associated with much that is best and most characteristic in the domestic architecture of later times".

With commissions for over 230 buildings during his career, Bryce is best known for perfecting the Scottish Baronial style, with which he pioneered the development of large and loosely planned country houses, for example Craigends House in Renfrewshire. His designs drew inspiration from 16th century Scottish architecture, including crow-stepped gables, turrets and carved doorways.

In his banks and public buildings, he preferred to use Italianate classical styles similar to those of Charles Barry - his design for Fettes College, Edinburgh was one of the first to revive the French château style. Several other architects trained under Bryce including Charles Kinnear, John Starforth, James M. Wardrop, James McLaren, John Milne, J. J. Stevenson, Sir James Gowans, William Hamilton Beattie and James Campbell Walker.

== List of architectural works ==
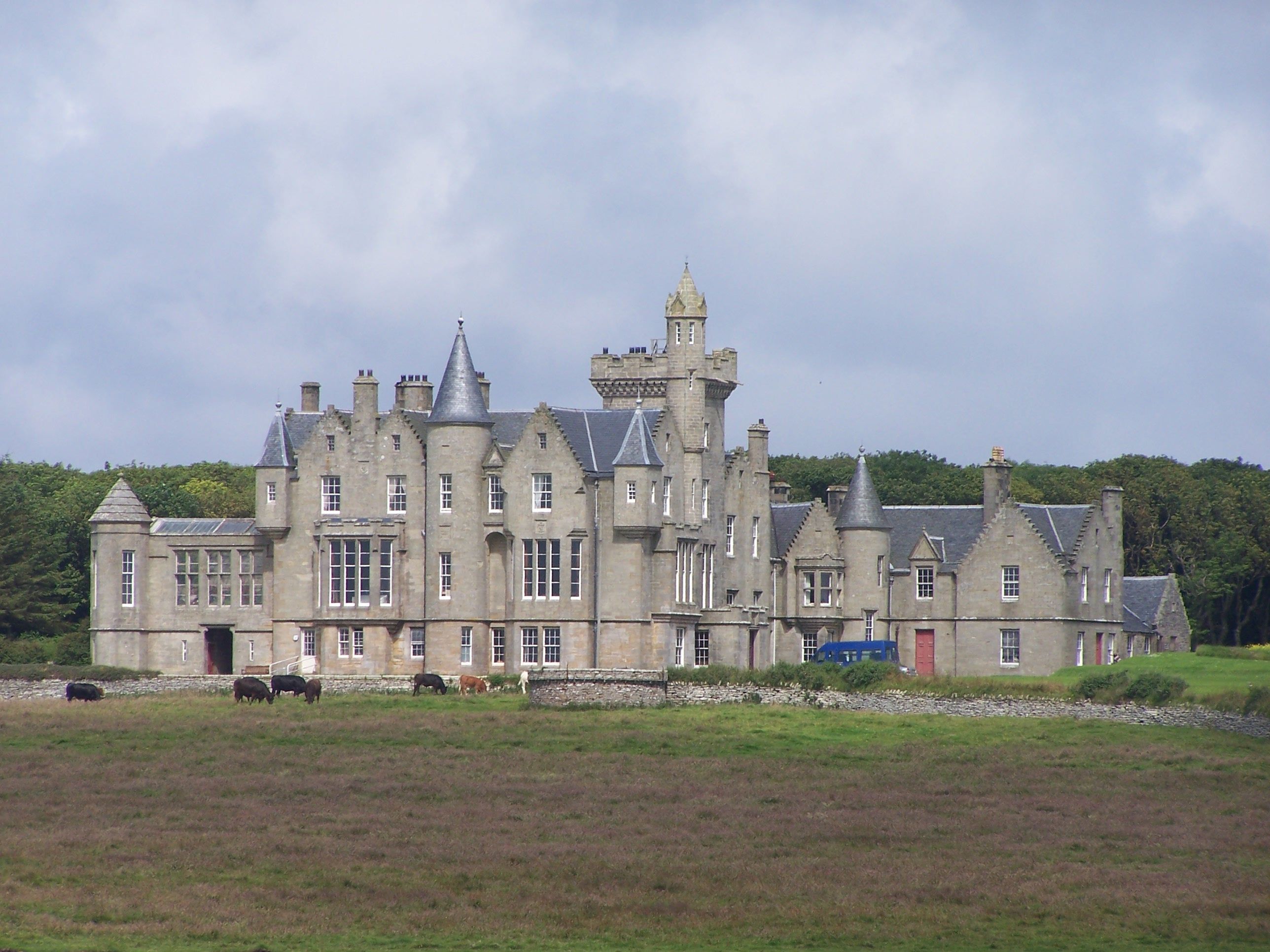
Balfour Castle

- Langlee Mansion House, Jedburgh, Scottish Borders (1868)
- Newton Hall, by Kennoway, Fife, (1829). Bryce's first known independent commission.
- St. Mark's Unitarian Church, Castle Terrace, Edinburgh (1834)
- Caledonian Insurance Company, 19 George Street, Edinburgh (1840)
- Luscar House, Gowkhall, Fife (1842) House demolished Aug 2003 - Stables remain, Elizabethan-Jacobean
- Life Association of Scotland building, Princes Street, Edinburgh (demolished) (1843)
- Extensions to Carradale House, Argyll and Bute (1844)
- Contributed to St Mary's Church, Dalkeith Palace, Midlothian (1844–54)
- Refit of interior to west end of Greyfriars Kirk (New Greyfriars) following a severe fire (1845).
- Headquarters of the British Linen Bank in St Andrew Square, Edinburgh (1846)
- Completion of Hamilton Mausoleum (1848)
- Supervision of the dismantling stone by stone of Trinity College Church to make way for the building of Waverley Station in Edinburgh (1848)
- Clifton Hall School, Edinburgh (1850) Scottish Baronial
- Falkland Parish Church, 1849
- Kimmerghame House, Berwickshire (1851–53) Scottish Baronial
- Panmure House, Angus (1852–55)
- Balfour Castle, Orkney (1853) Scottish Baronial
- Surgical Hospital, High School Yards, Edinburgh (1853)
- The Royal Exchange, Dundee (1854-1855)
- The Glen, Peeblesshire (1854–1855) Scottish Baronial
- Torosay Castle, Isle of Mull (1856) Scottish Baronial
- Shambellie House, New Abbey, Kirkcudbrightshire (1856)
- Pittendreich House, Lasswade (1857)
- Craigends House, Houston, Renfrewshire (1857) Scottish Baronial (demolished)
- Eastbury Park, Northwood (1857) Scottish Baronial (demolished)
- Freemasons' Hall, George Street, Edinburgh (demolished and replaced) (1858)
- Eaglesham House 1859-
- Craigflower House, Torryburn, Dunfermline (1860)
- Life Association of Scotland, 40-41 Dame Street, Dublin, Ireland (1861-64)
- Dalmore House, Stair, East Ayrshire (1864–70) French Renaissance
- Redesign of the headquarters of the Bank of Scotland, The Mound, Edinburgh (1864–71)
- Carnwath Parish Church (1869)
- Remodelling of Meikleour House (1869-1870)
- Glenapp Castle, Ballantrae, Ayrshire (1870)
- Fettes College, Edinburgh (1870–73) designed 1864.
- Edinburgh Royal Infirmary's former building by the Meadows (1870–79)
- Trumland House, Orkney (1876)
- Lockhart Hospital, Lanark (later William Smellie Memorial Hospital) (1874-1877)
- Edinburgh branch of the Union Bank of Scotland (now pub restaurant The Standing Order), George Street (1876)
- Langton House, Berwickshire (demolished) (1886)
- Newliston, Lothian (Neoclassical wings added to main house built by Robert Adam) and Scottish Baronial gatehouse (dates unknown).

== Gallery of architectural work ==
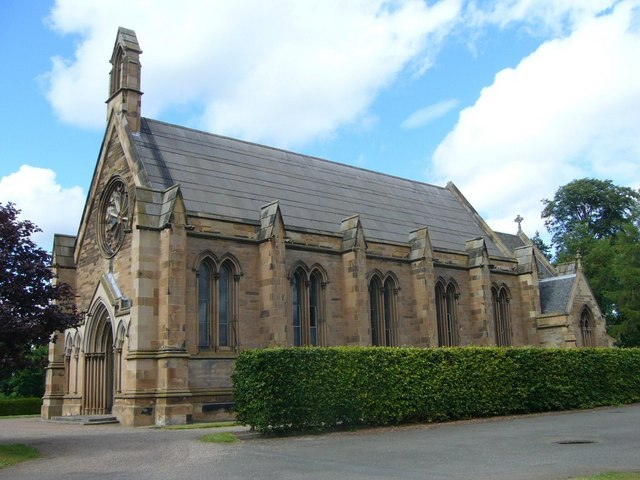
St. Mary's Church, Dalkeith Park

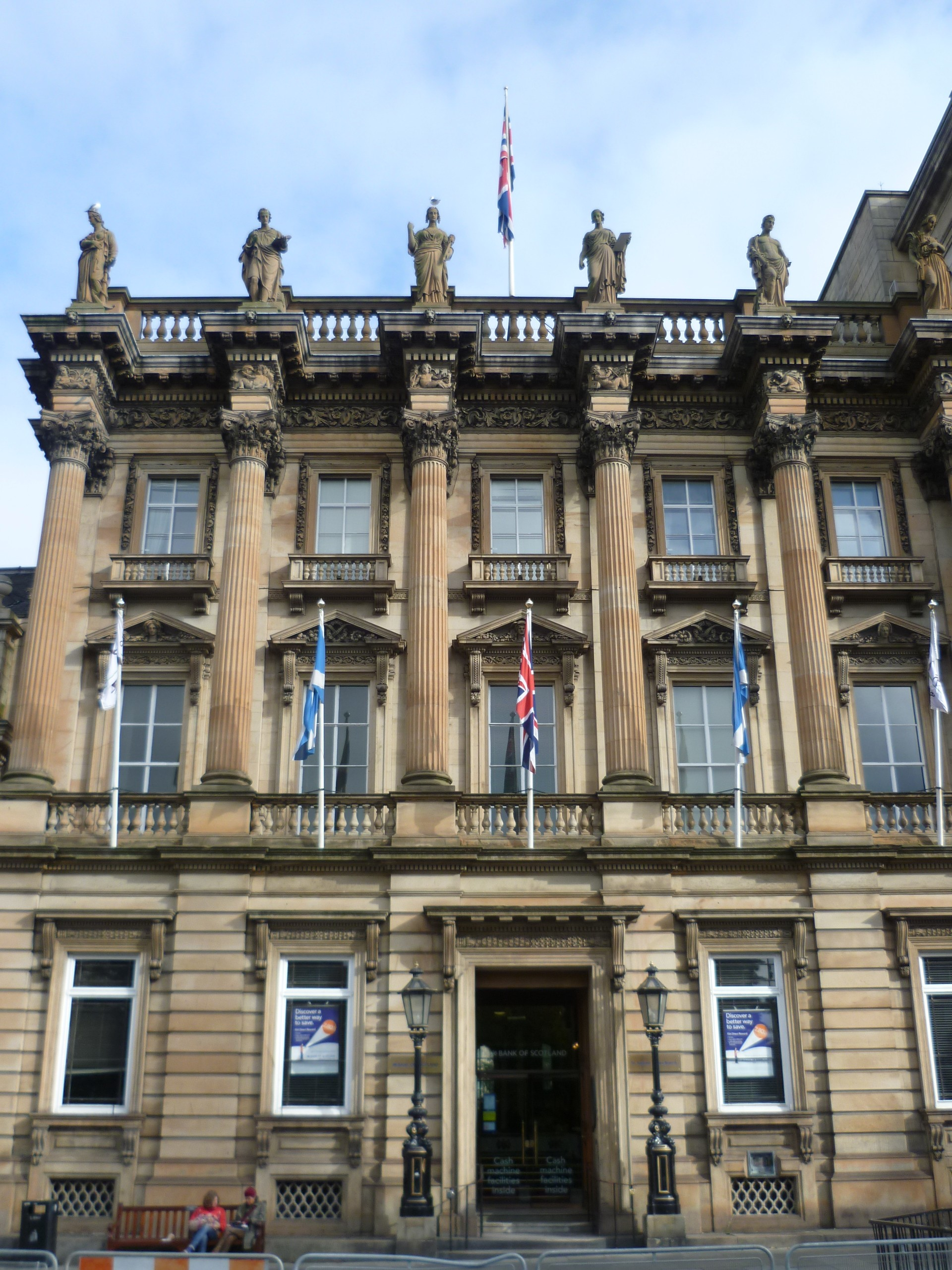
Former British Linen Bank, St. Andrew Square

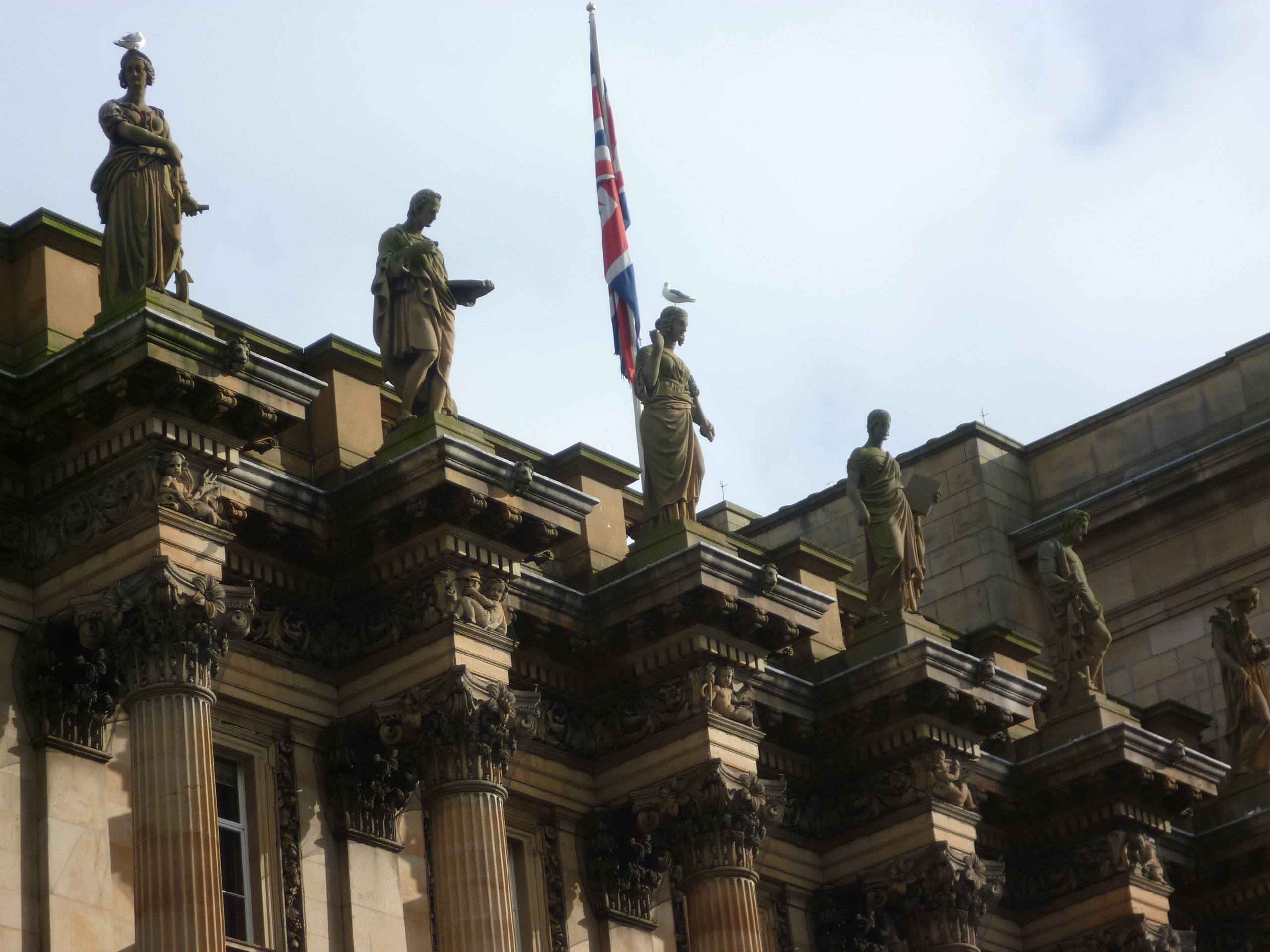
Statues on the British Linen Bank building

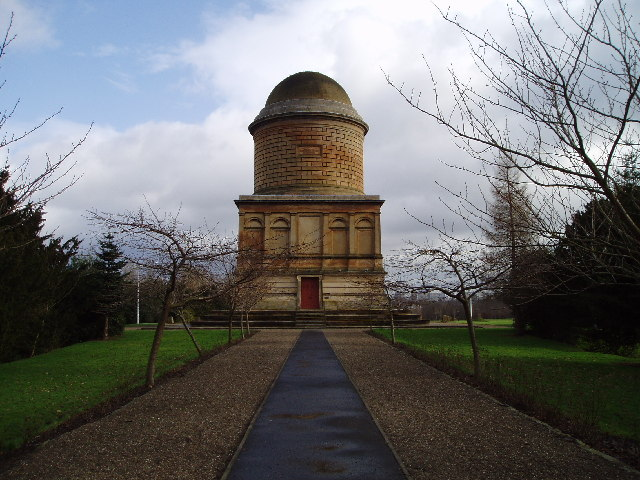
Hamilton Mausoleum, exterior

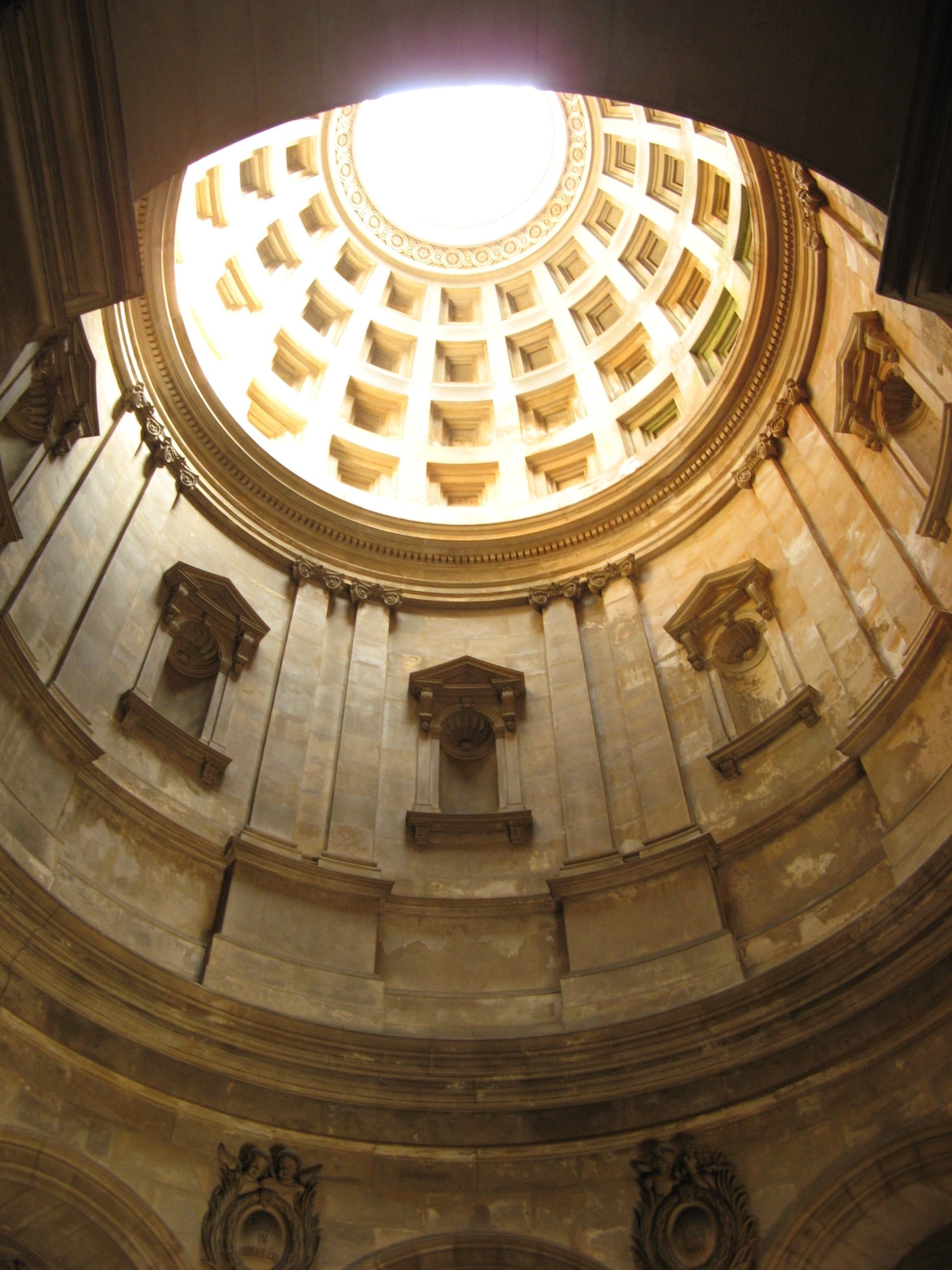
Hamilton Mausoleum, interior

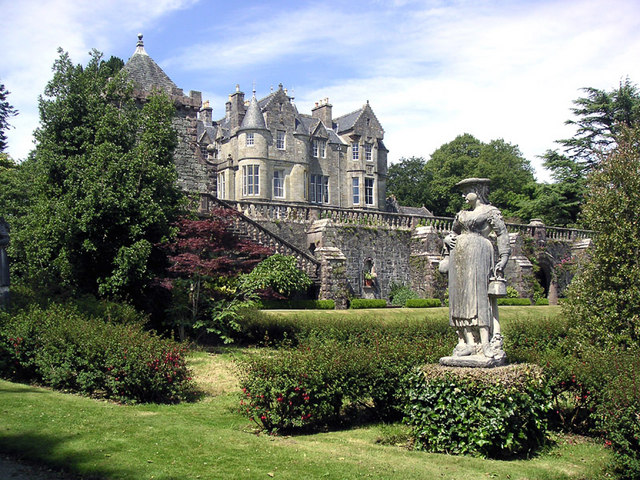
Torosay Castle, Isle of Mull

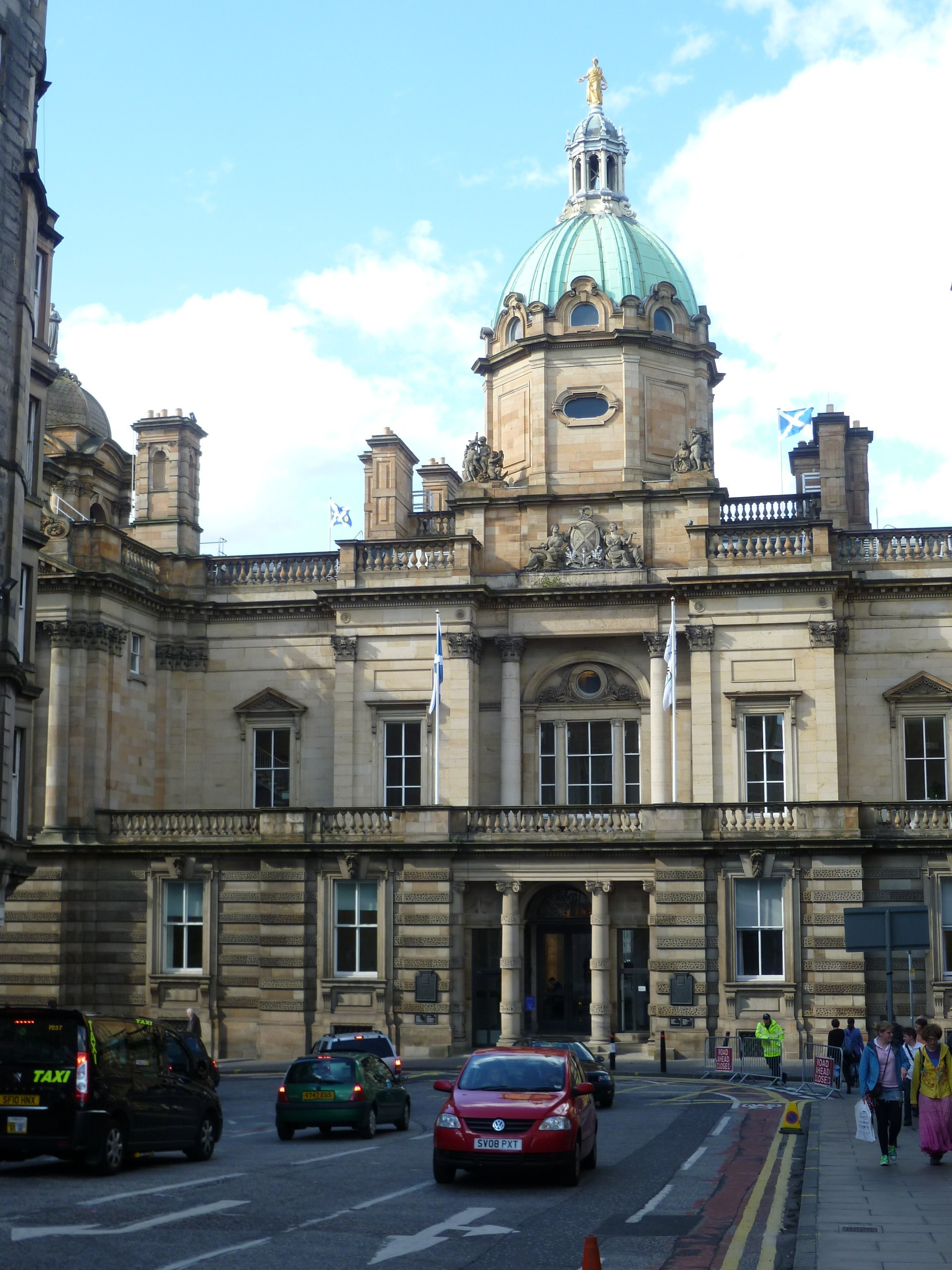
Bank of Scotland Head Office

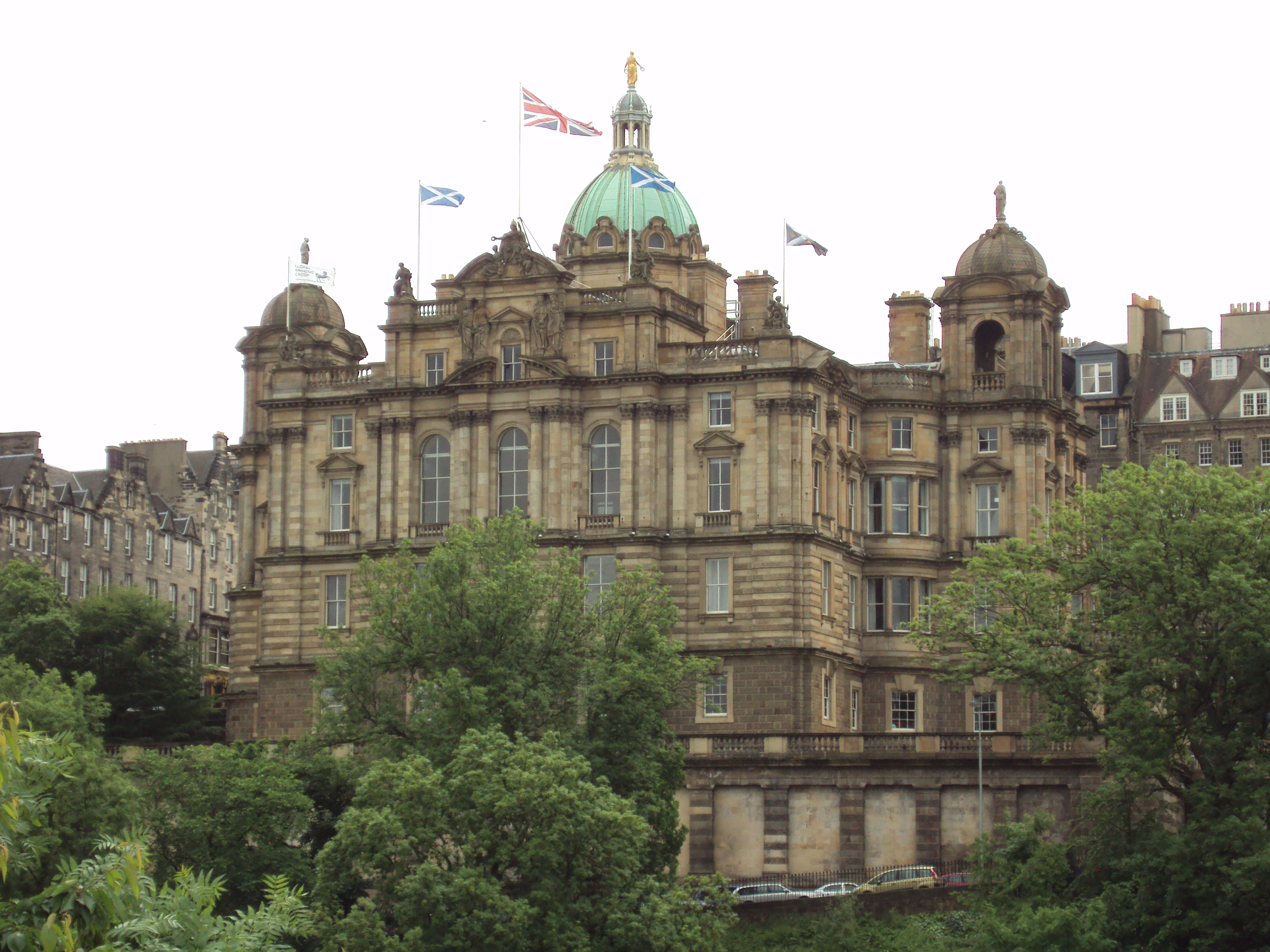
Bank of Scotland Head Office on the Mound

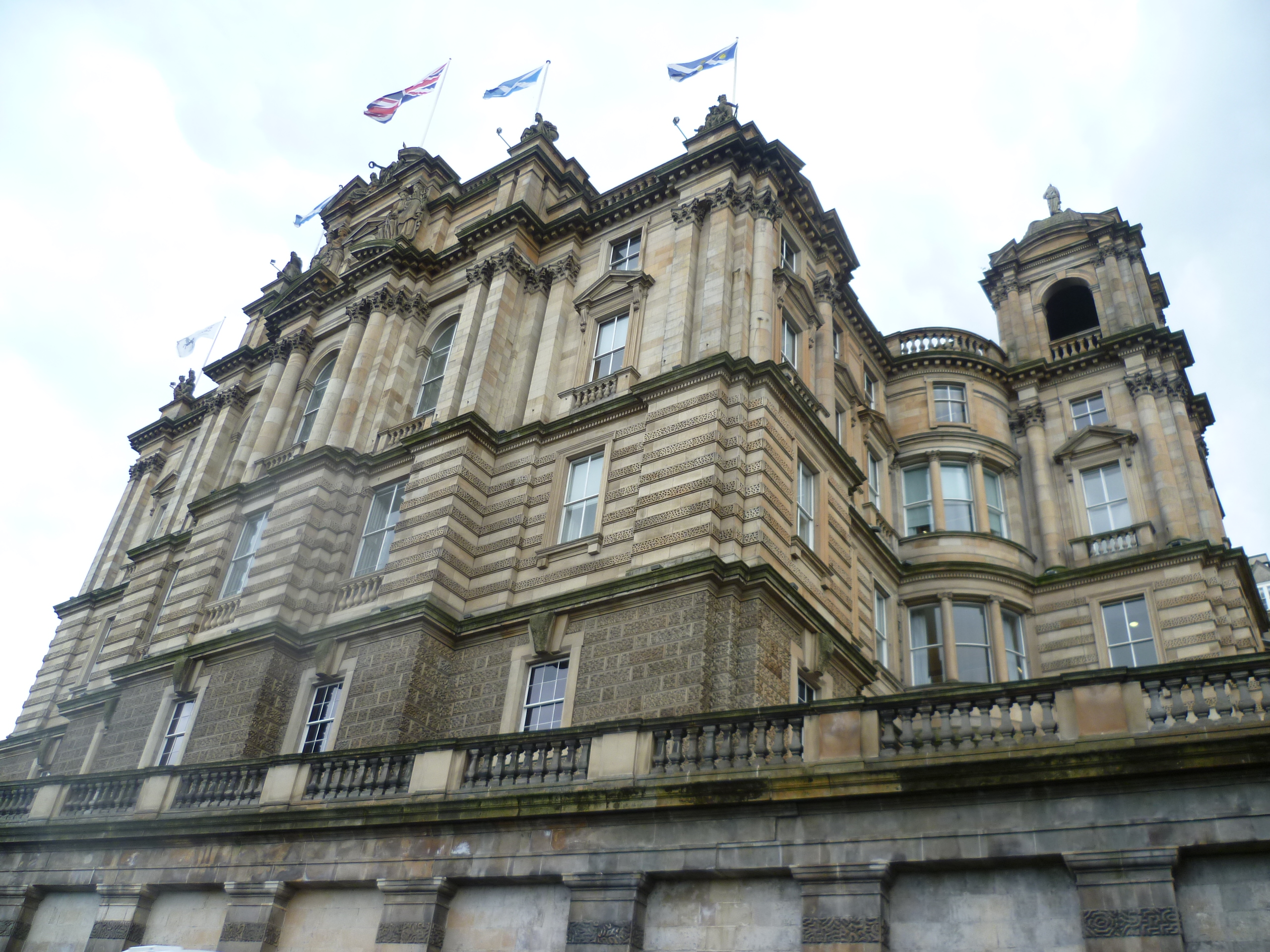
Bank of Scotland Head Office, seen from Market Street

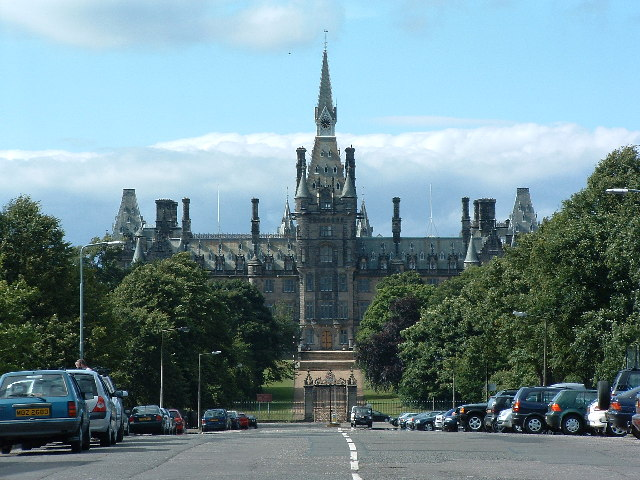
Fettes College, Edinburgh

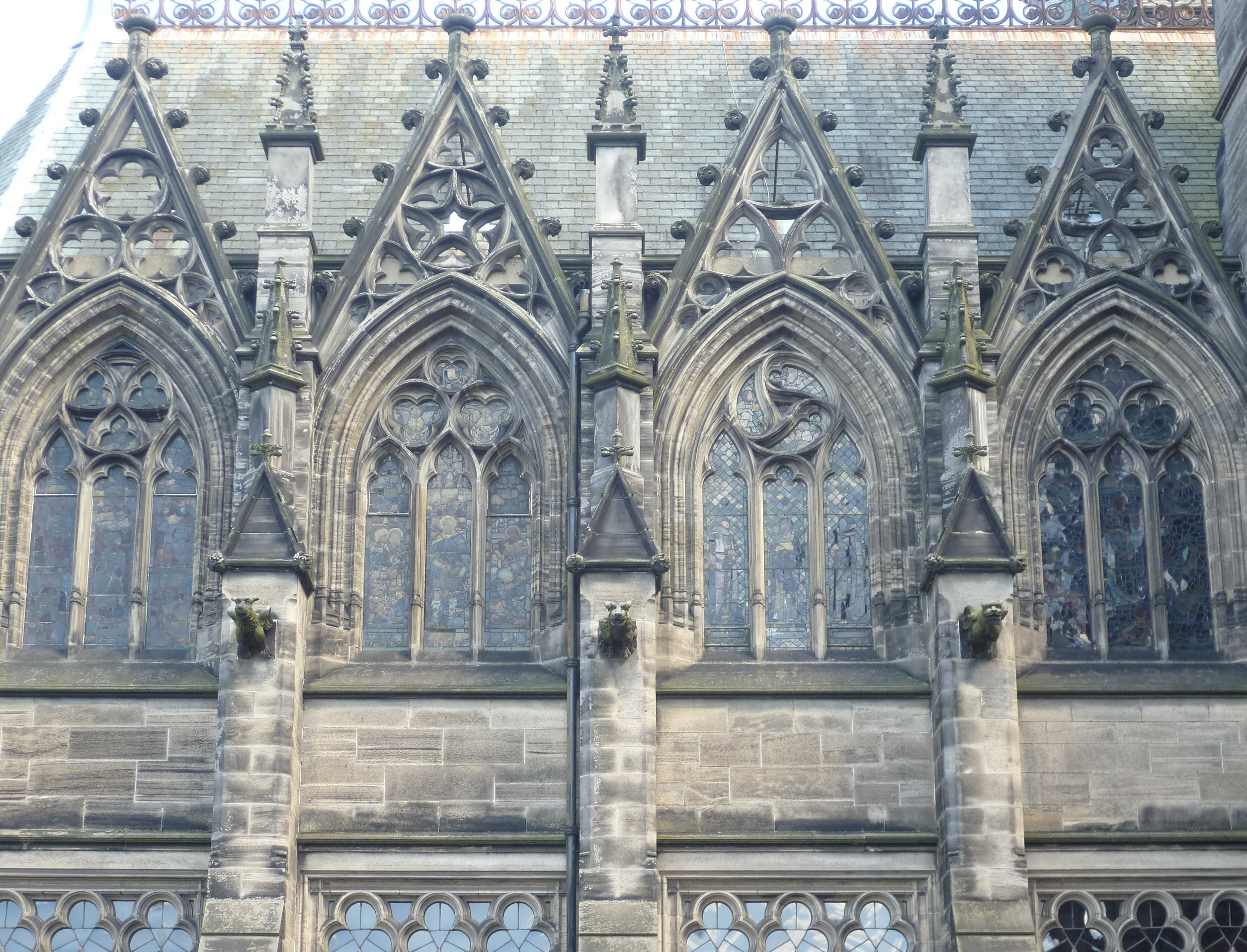
Fettes College Chapel detail

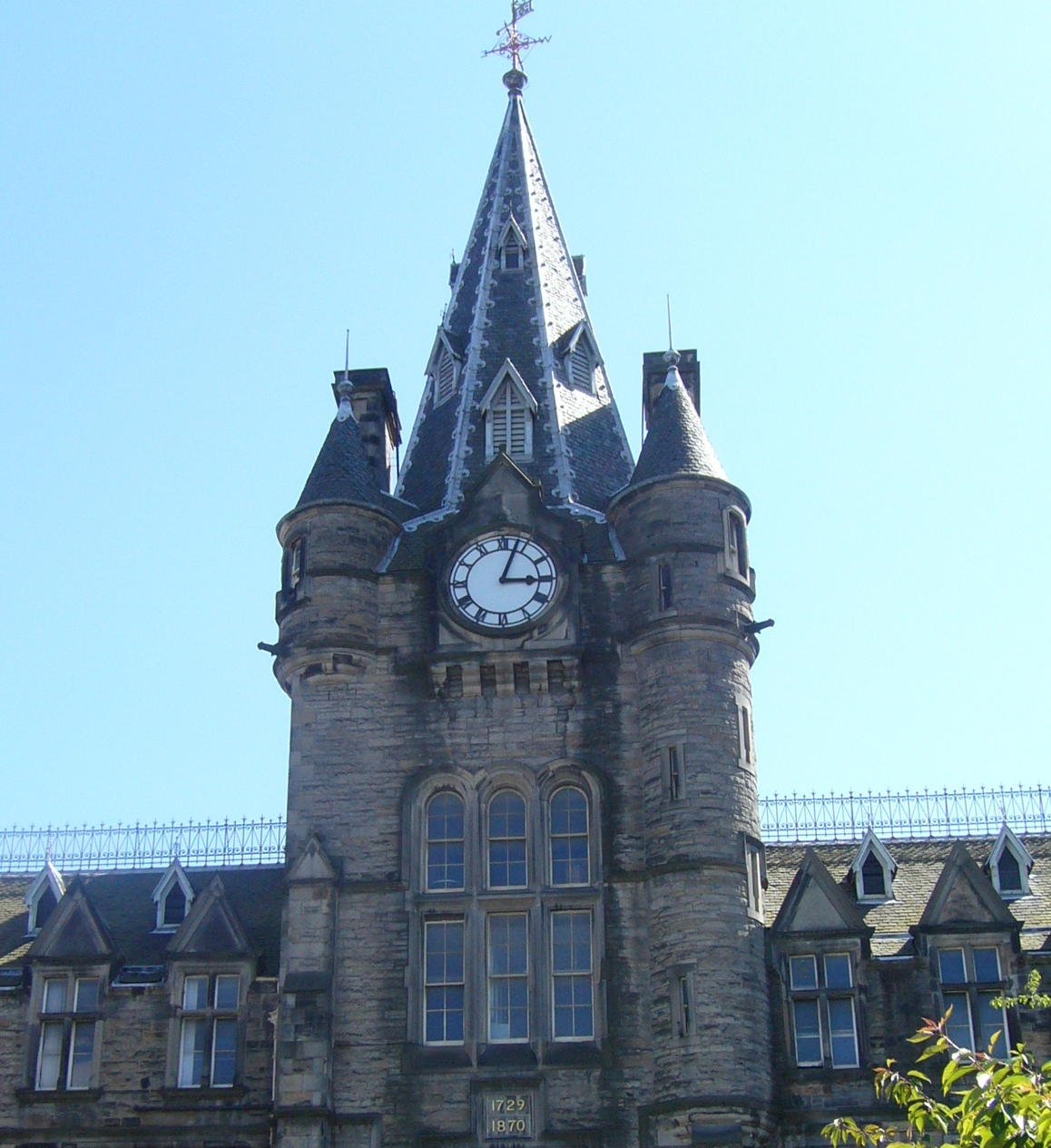
Clocktower of the Royal Infirmary, Edinburgh

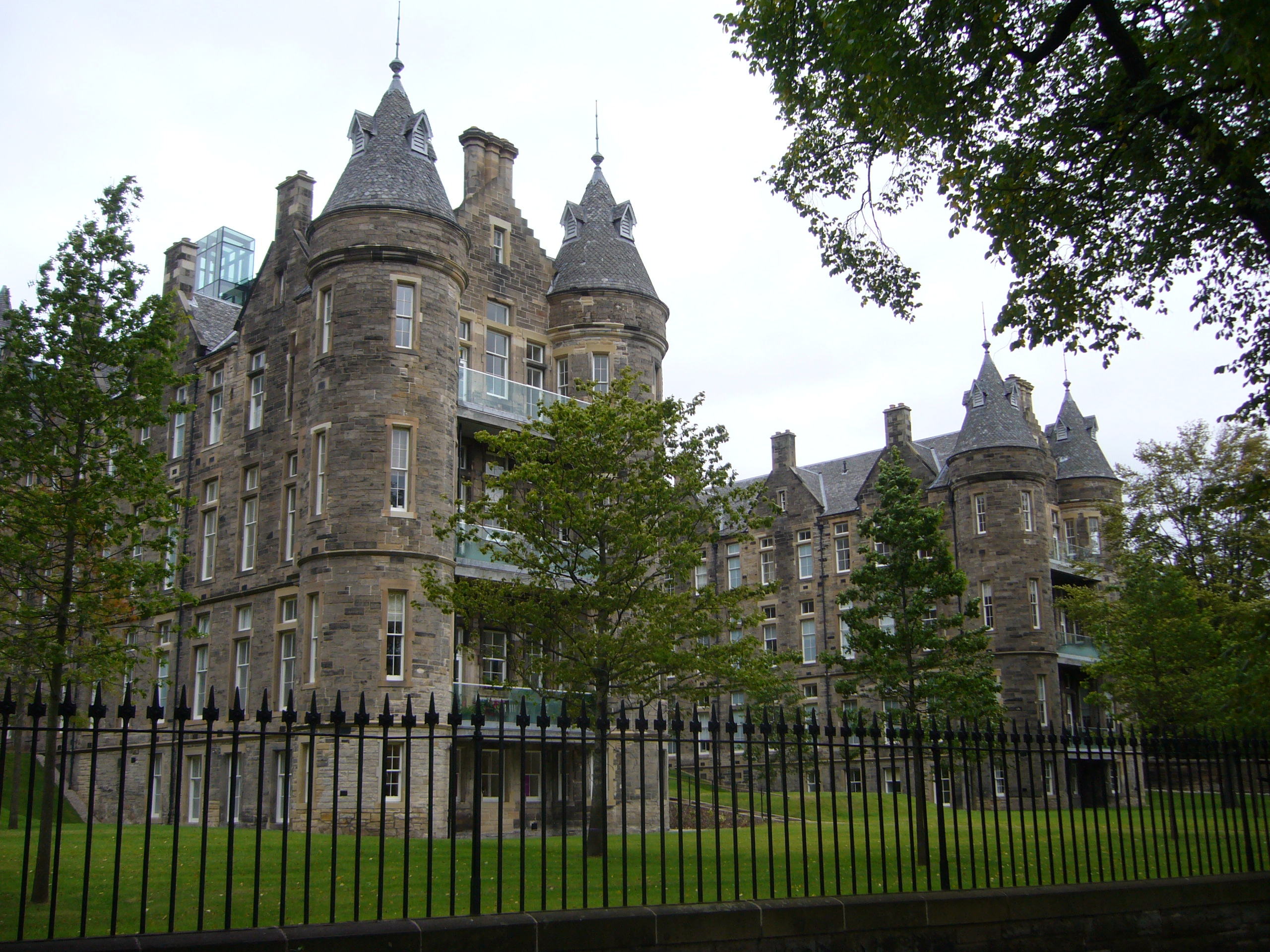
Hospital wards of the Royal Infirmary

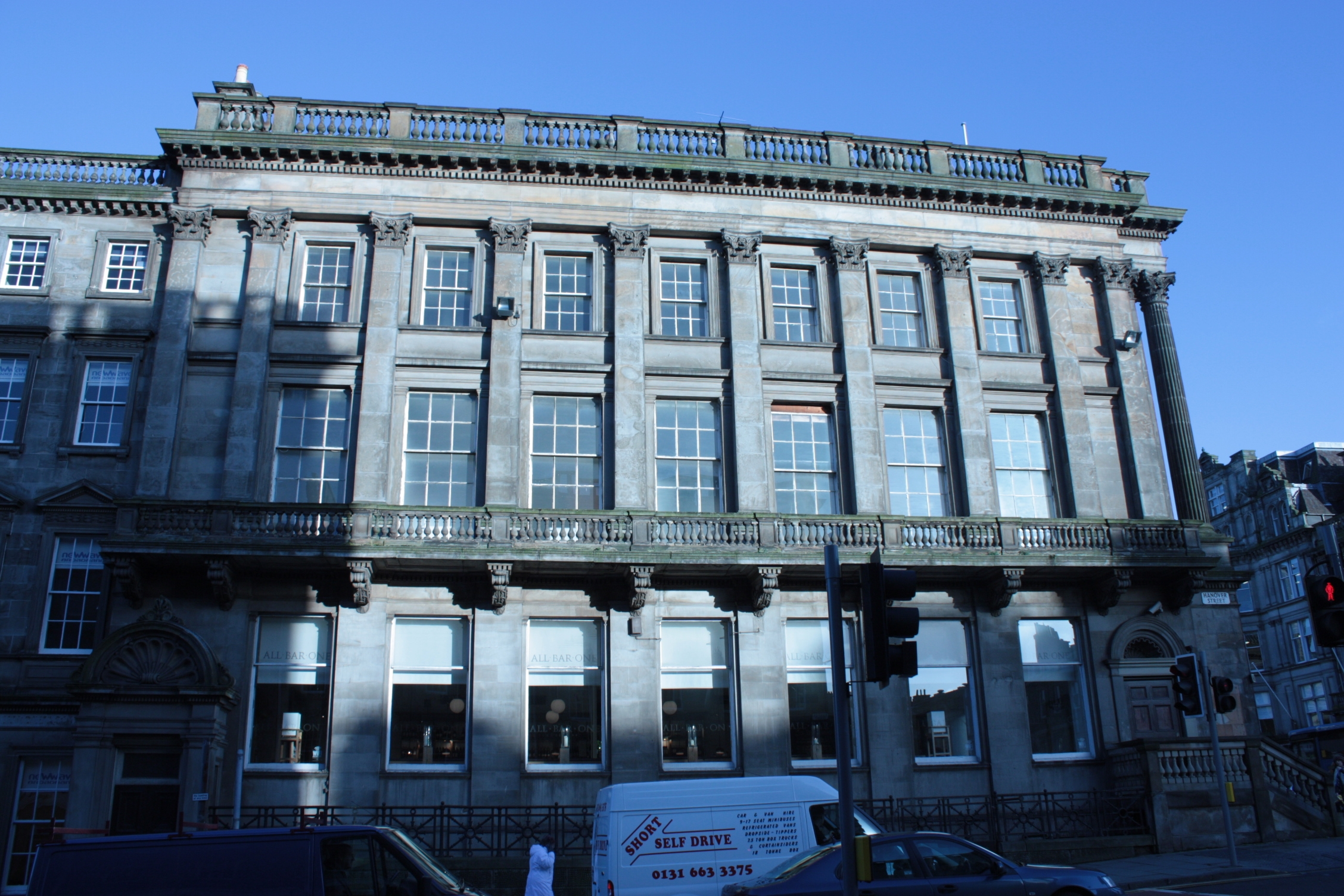
Bryce's bank on the corner of George St and Hanover St Edinburgh

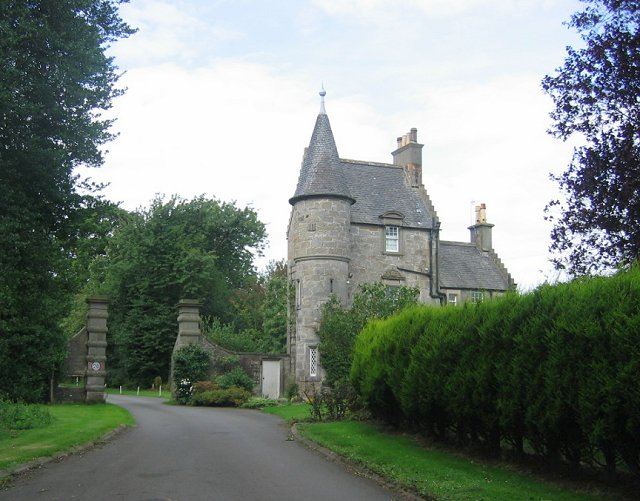
Bryce's gatehouse at Newliston

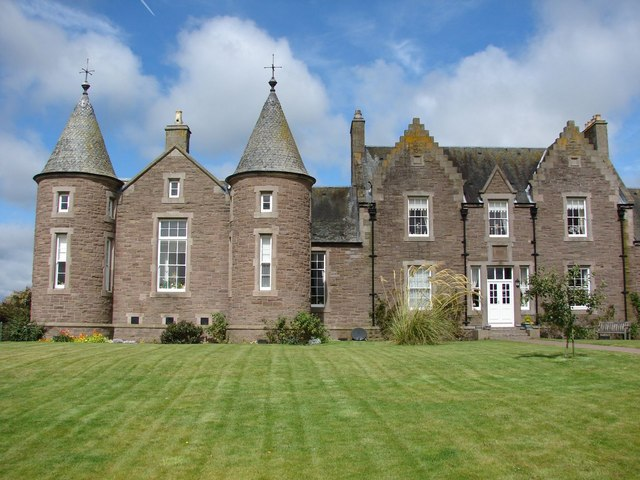
Lockhart Hospital, Lanark
