= Carradale Point Fort =

Vitrified fort in Argyll and Bute, Scotland

Coordinates: 55.5730°N 5.4673°W

Carradale Point Fort is a promontory vitrified fort on Carradale Point near Carradale, Argyll and Bute, Scotland. The fort measures 56.5 metres (185 ft) by 23 metres (75 ft) internally.
