= Dippen, Argyll =

Hamlet on the east coast of the Kintyre Peninsula in Scotland

Coordinates: 55°34′16″N 5°29′25″W

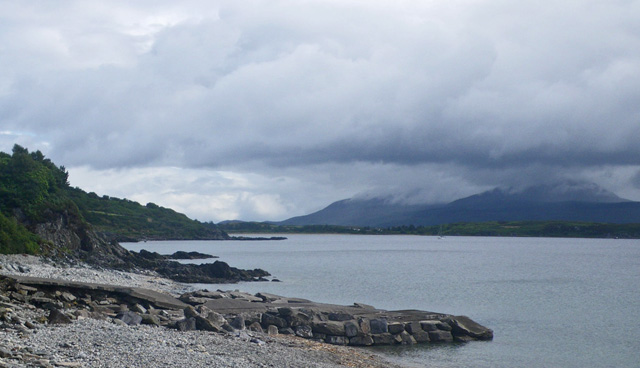
Shoreline at the south of Dippen Bay

Dippen (Scottish Gaelic: Duipinn) is a hamlet on the east coast of the Kintyre Peninsula in Scotland. The community of Dippen is near Dippen Bay. Roads on the east coast of Kintyre were greatly improved in the era circa 1776, when the settlement was known as Duppin.

== See also ==
- Torrisdale Bay
