= Kildonald Bay =

Bay in Scotland

Coordinates: 55°29′26″N 5°30′40″W

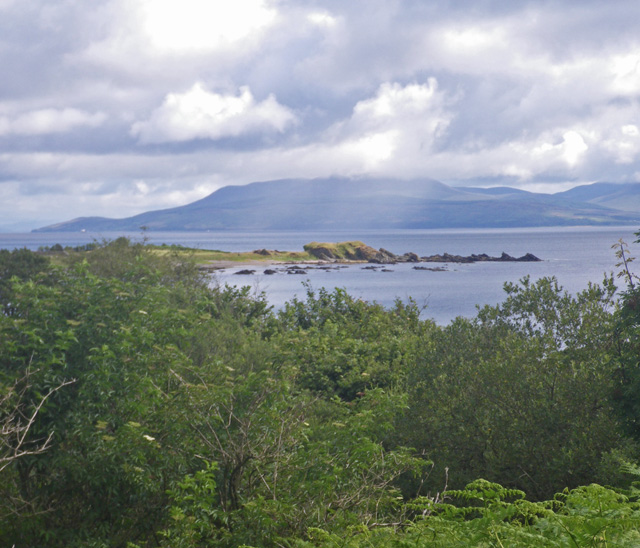
Kildonald Bay.

Kildonald Bay is a bay on the eastern side of the Kintyre Peninsula of Scotland. Kildonald Bay is an element of Kilbrannan Sound that separates the Kintyre Peninsula from the Isle of Arran. Other bays along the east side of the Kintyre Peninsula include Dippen Bay.

== See also ==
- Saddell Abbey
