= Dippen Bay =

Embayment along Kilbrannan Sound in Scotland

Coordinates: 55°34′16″N 5°29′25″W

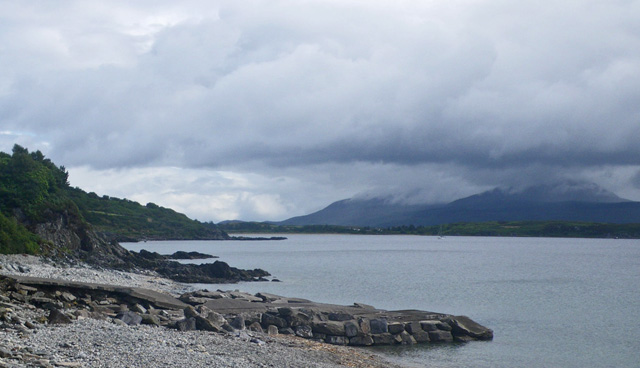
Shoreline at the south of Dippen Bay.

Dippen Bay is an embayment along Kilbrannan Sound on the east coast of the Kintyre Peninsula in Scotland. Coastal erosion has been documented at Dippen Bay as well as nearby Torrisdale Bay. The bay is located along the coast near the hamlet of Dippen.

== See also ==
- Kildonald Bay
