= Kilbrannan Sound =

Body of water in the Firth of Clyde, Scotland

- An Caolas Branndanach (Scottish Gaelic)
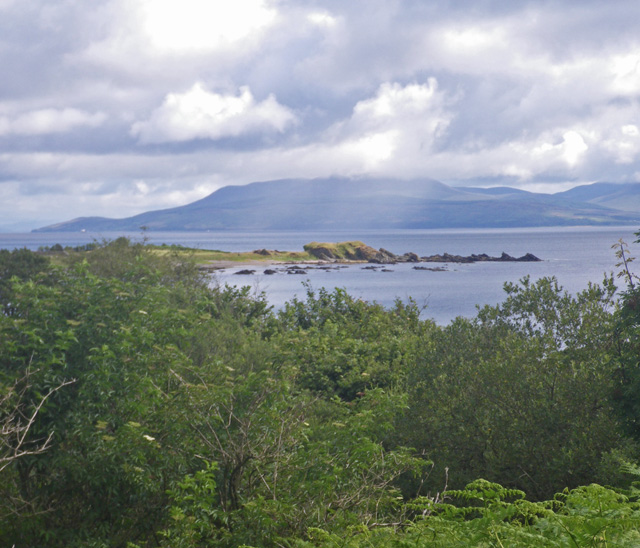
- Scrubby coastal area at the north of Kildonald Bay

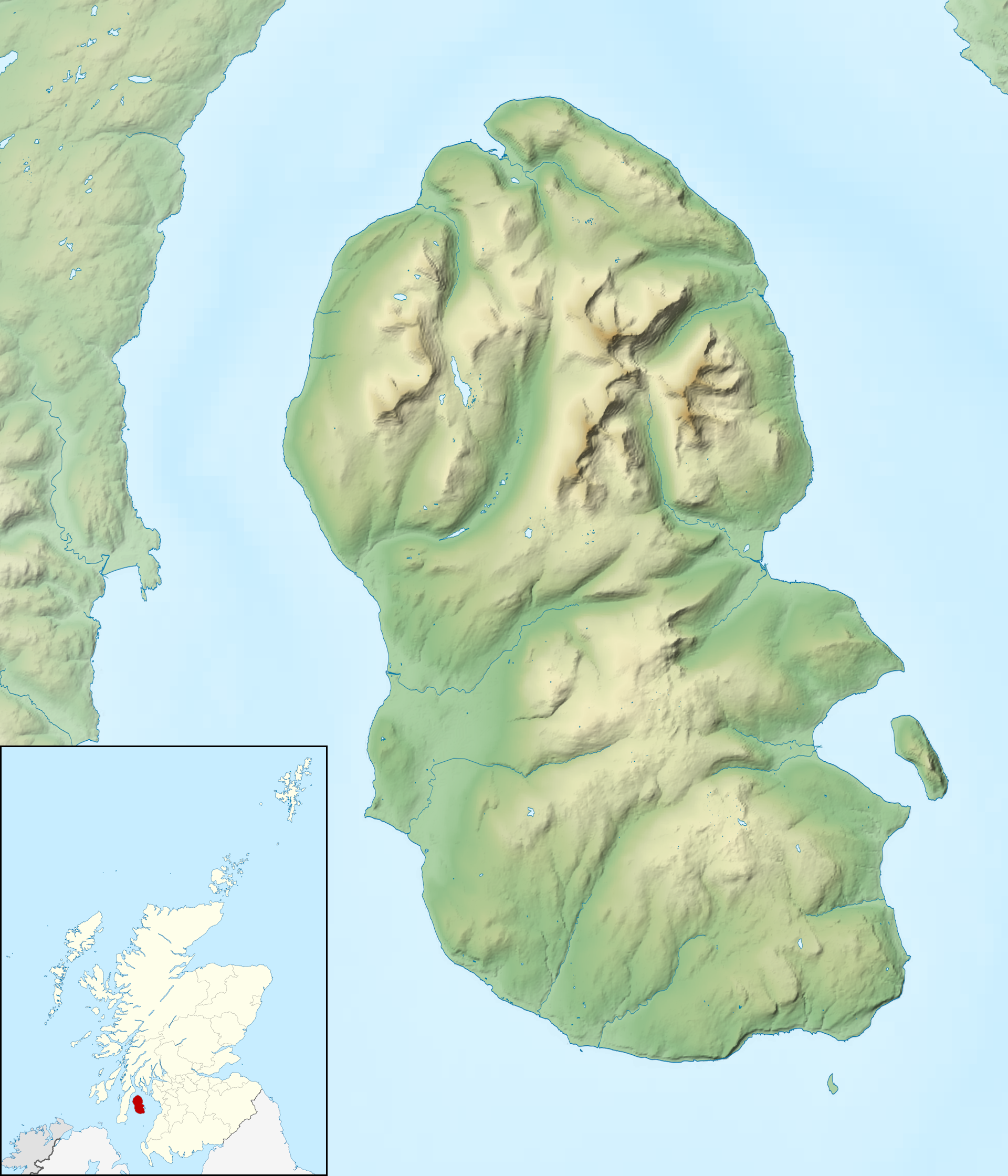
- Location within Arran
- Location: Firth of Clyde
- Coordinates: 55°36′34″N 5°26′00″W
- Type: Sound
- Basin countries: Scotland
- Surface elevation: 0 metres (0 ft)
- Frozen: No
- Islands: Isle of Arran

Kilbrannan Sound (Scottish Gaelic: An Caolas Branndanach) is a marine water body in the west of Scotland. It separates the Kintyre Peninsula from the island of Arran. Kilbrannan Sound is the western arm of the lower Firth of Clyde.

== See also ==
- Dippen Bay
- Kildonald Bay
