= Isle of Bute =

Island in the Firth of Clyde in Scotland

Eilean Bhòid or An t-Eilean Bòdach (Gaelic); Buit (Scots)
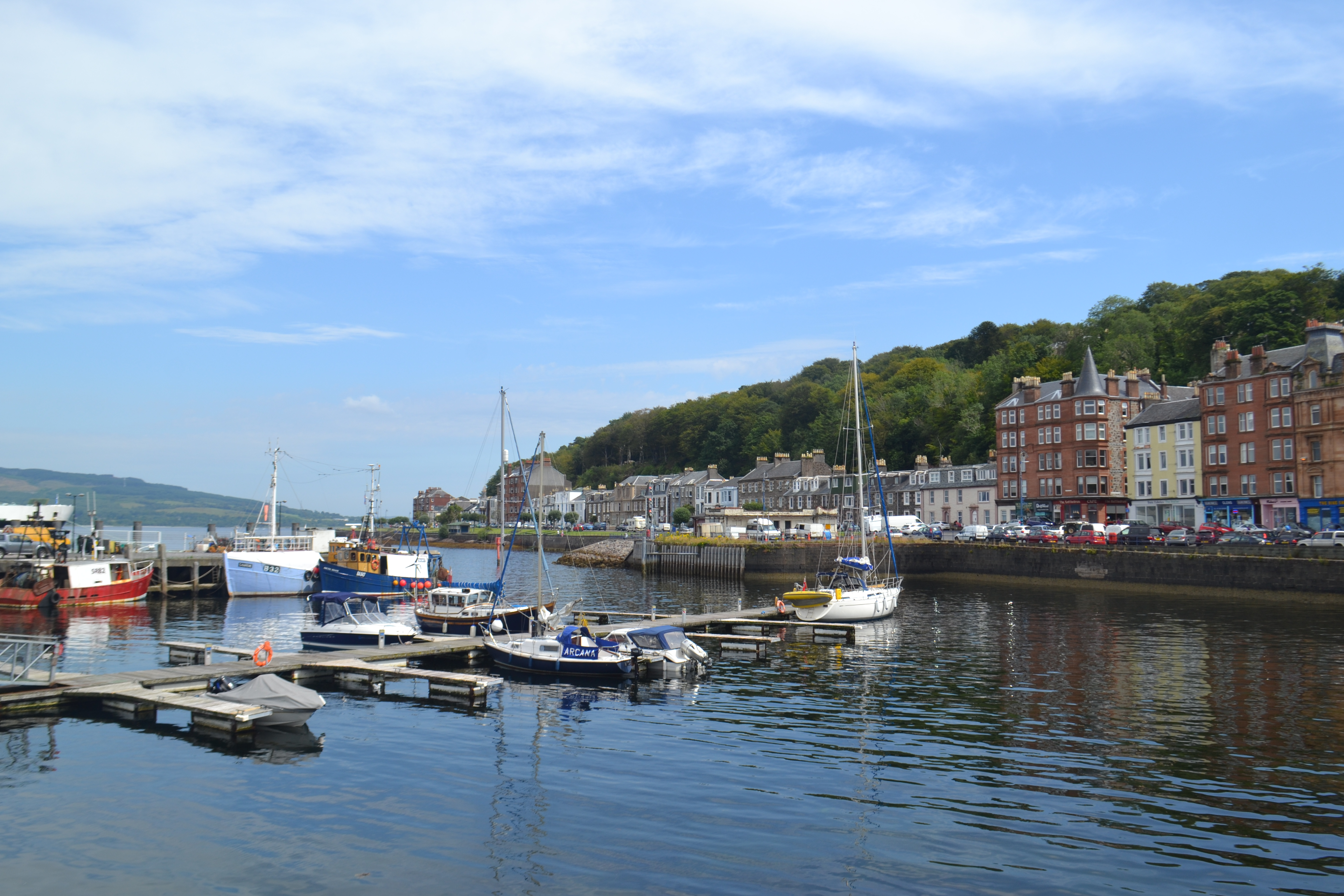
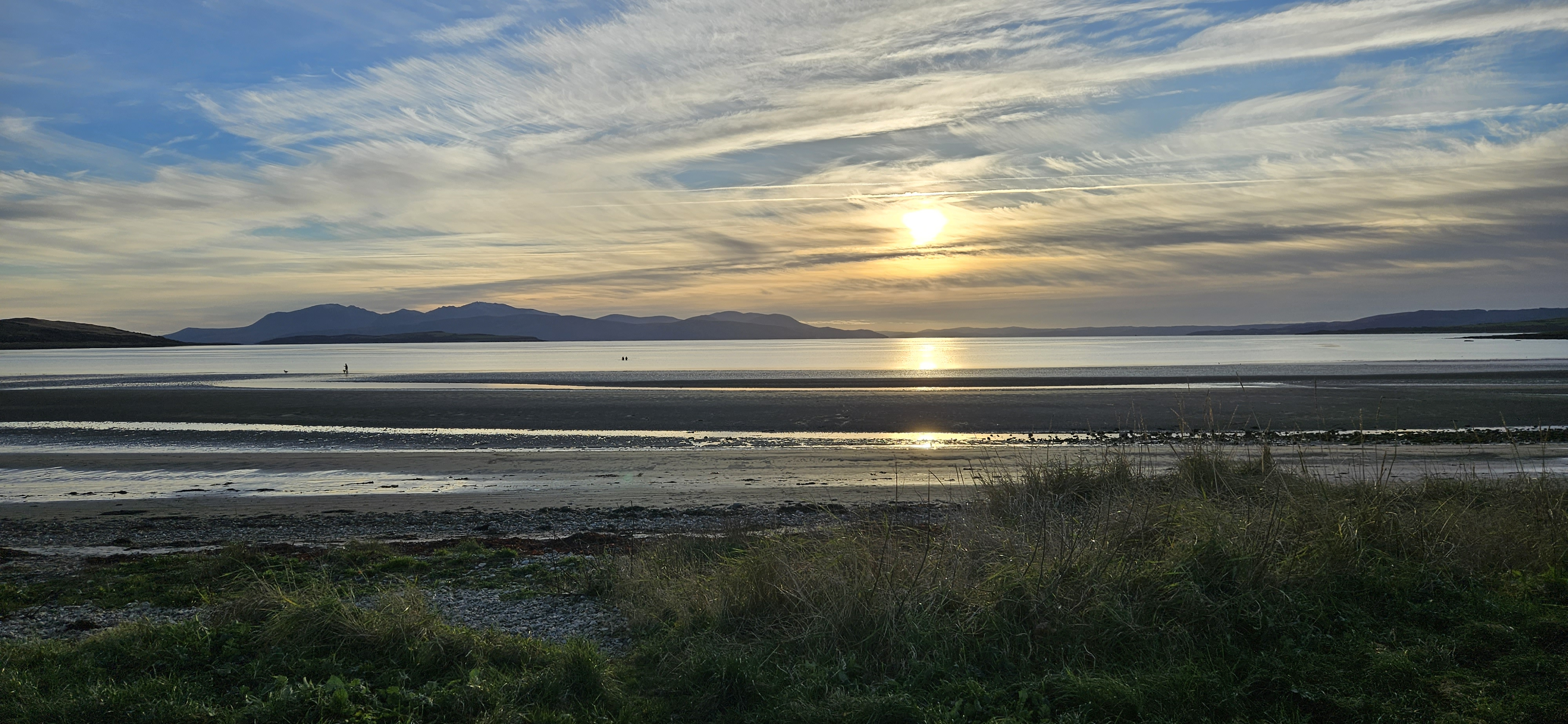
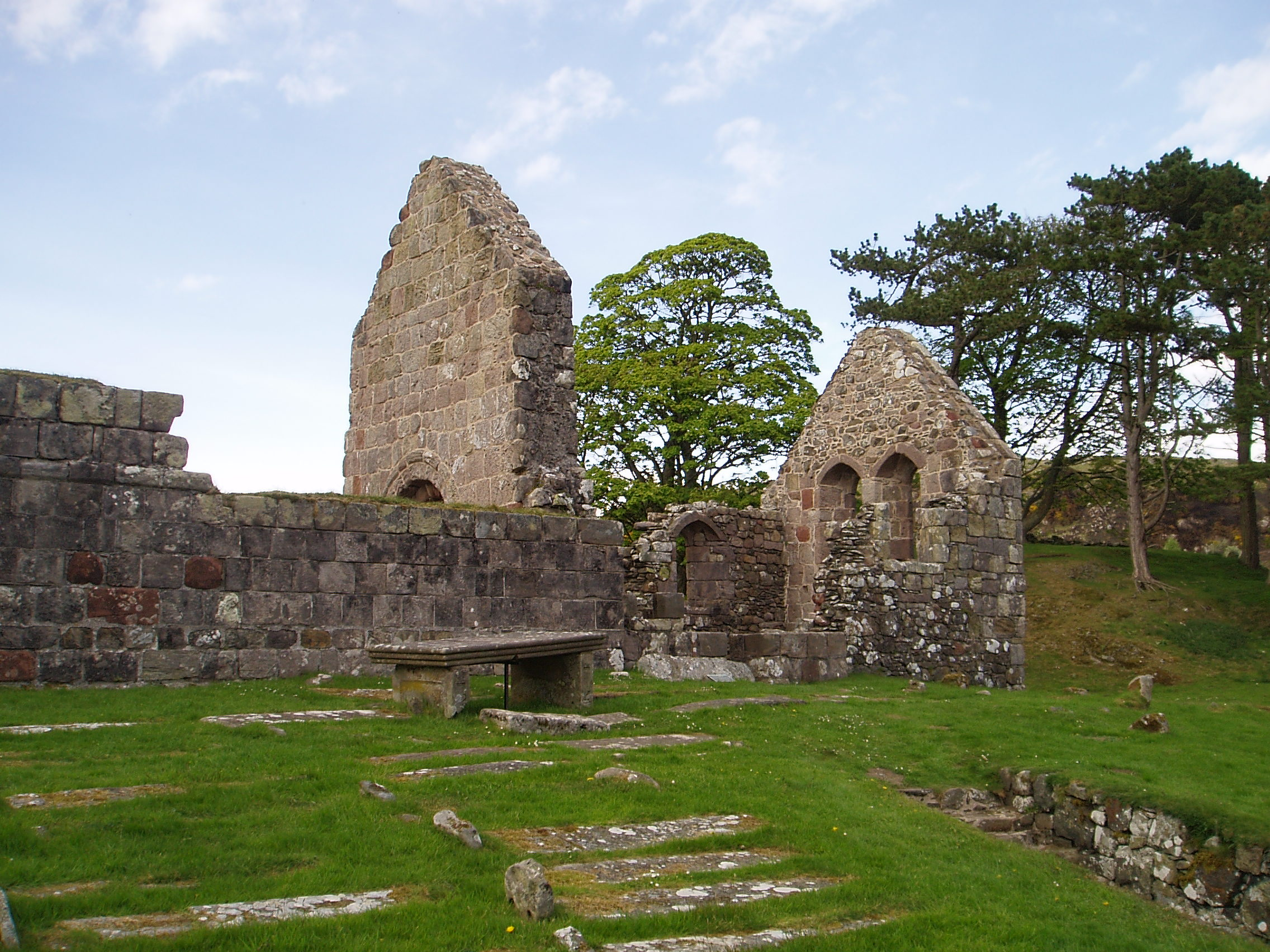
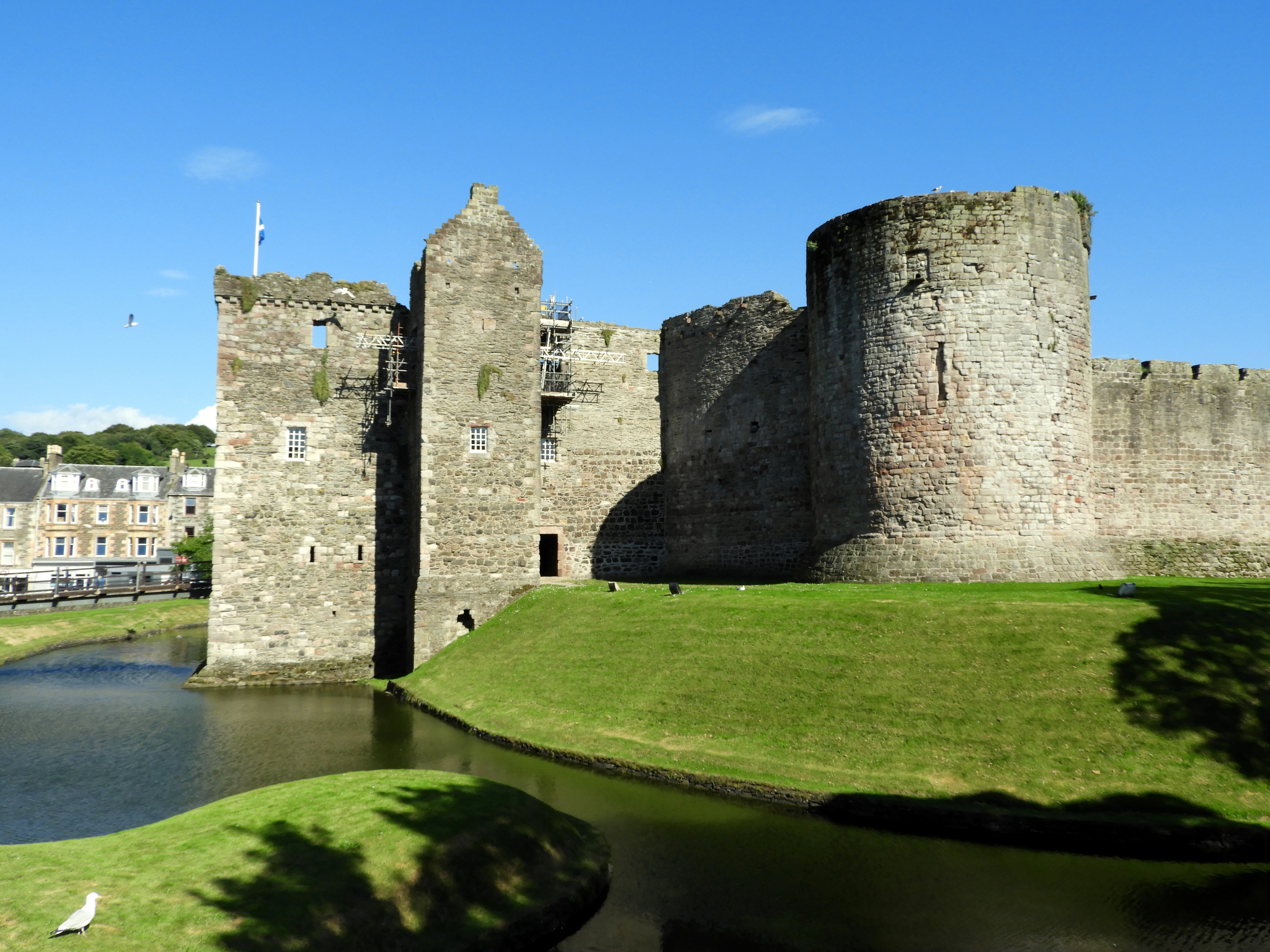
- Rothesay waterfront Ettrick Bay St. Blane's Church Rothesay Castle Mount Stuart House

Location
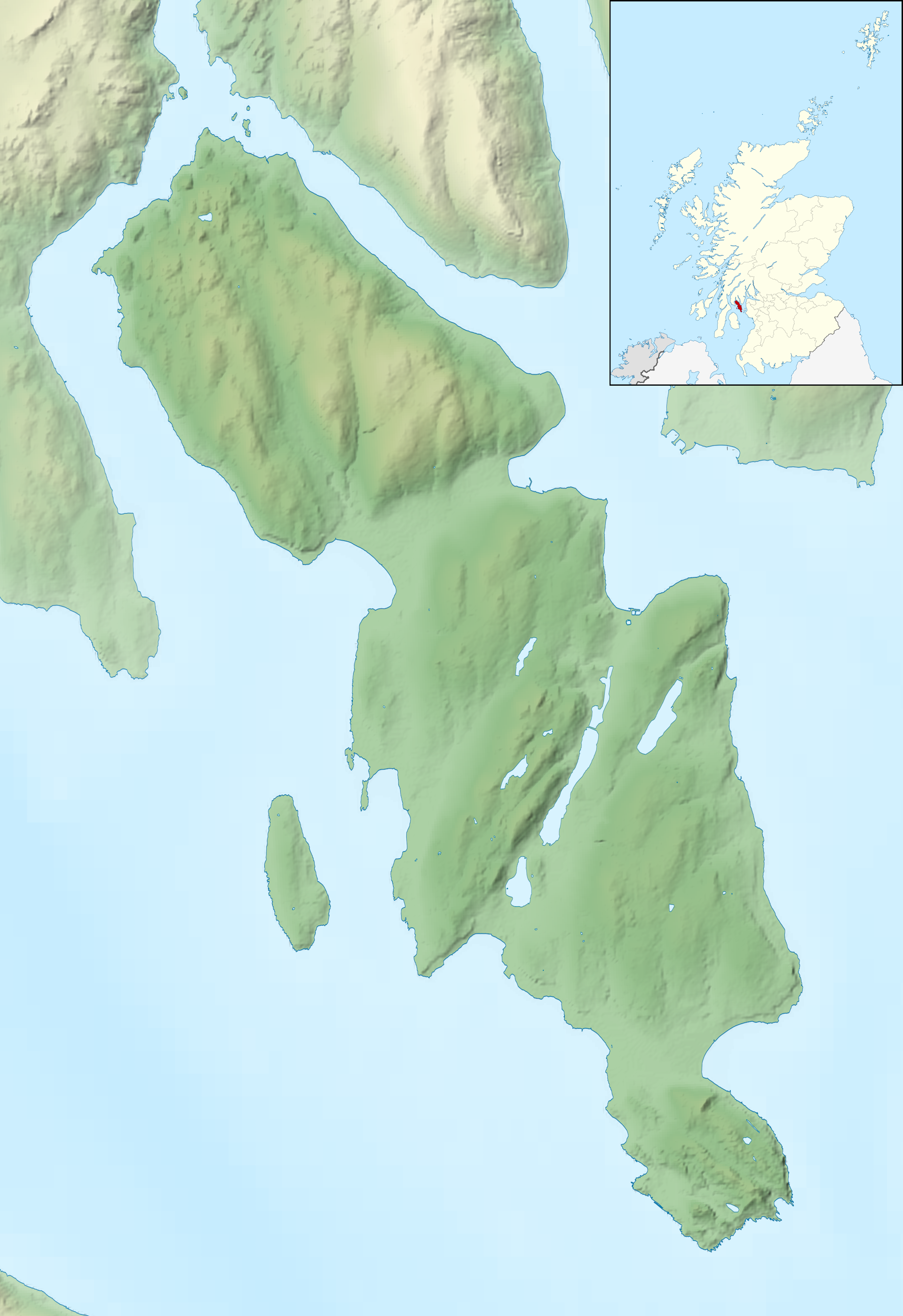
- Map of Bute & surrounding islands Bute shown within Argyll and Bute
- OS grid reference: NS065651
- Coordinates: 55°49′26″N 05°06′39″W

Name
- Name meaning: Uncertain
- Old Norse name: Bót

Physical geography
- Island group: Firth of Clyde
- Area: 12,217 ha (47 1/8 sq mi)
- Area rank: 13
- Highest elevation: Windy Hill, 278 m (912 ft)

Administration
- Council area: Argyll and Bute
- Country: Scotland
- Sovereign state: United Kingdom

Demographics
- Population: 6,047
- Population rank: 5
- Population density: 49.5/km^{2} (128/sq mi)
- Largest settlement: Rothesay

The Isle of Bute (Scots: Buit; Scottish Gaelic: Eilean Bhòid or An t-Eilean Bòdach), known as Bute (/bjuːt/), is an island in the Firth of Clyde in Scotland. It is divided into highland and lowland areas by the Highland Boundary Fault.

Formerly a constituent island of the larger County of Bute, it is now part of the council area of Argyll and Bute. Bute's resident population was 6,498 in 2011, a decline of just over 10% from the figure of 7,228 recorded in 2001 against a background of Scottish island populations as a whole growing by 4% to 103,702 for the same period.

== Name ==
The name "Bute" is of uncertain origin. Watson and Mac an Tàilleir support a derivation from Old Irish bót ("fire"), perhaps in reference to signal fires. This reference to beacon fires may date from the Viking period, when the island was probably known to the Norse as Bót. Other possible derivations include Brittonic budh ("corn"), "victory", St Brendan, or both, his monastic cell. There is no likely derivation from Ptolemy's Ebudae.

The island was also known during the Viking era as Rothesay, possibly referring to the personal name Roth or Roderick and the Old Norse suffix ey ("island"). This name was eventually taken by the main town on the island, whose Gaelic name is Baile Bhòid ("town of Bute").

== Geography ==
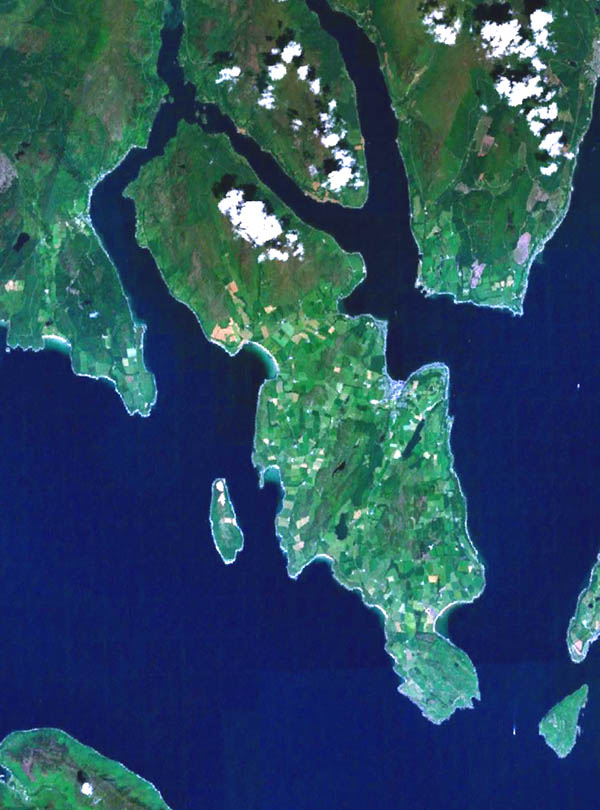
Satellite image of the Isle of Bute. To the west of Bute is the island of Inchmarnock and to the east are The Cumbraes. Bute lies in the Firth of Clyde. The only town on the island, Rothesay (NS087645). is linked by ferry to the mainland Wemyss Bay. To its north is the coastal village of Port Bannatyne; hamlets on the island include Ascog, Kilchattan Bay, and Kingarth.

The interior of the island is hilly, though not mountainous, with conifer plantations and some uncultivated land, particularly in the north. The highest point is Windy Hill at 278 metres (912 ft). The centre of the island contains most of the cultivated land, while the island's most rugged terrain is found in the far south around Glen Callum. Loch Fad is Bute's largest body of freshwater and runs along the fault line.

The western side of Bute is known for its beaches, many of which enjoy fine views over the Sound of Bute towards Arran and Bute's smaller satellite island Inchmarnock. Hamlets on the western side of the island include Straad, around St. Ninian's Bay, and Kildavanan on Ettrick Bay.

In the north, Bute is separated from the Cowal peninsula by the Kyles of Bute. The northern part of the island is more sparsely populated, and the ferry terminal at Rhubodach connects the island to the mainland at Colintraive by the smaller of the island's two ferries. The crossing is one of the shortest, less than 300 metres (330 yd), and takes only a few minutes but is busy because many tourists prefer the scenic route to the island.

North Bute forms part of the Kyles of Bute National Scenic Area, one of 40 in Scotland.

== Geology ==
Bute straddles the divide between highland and lowland Scotland with the Highland Boundary Fault cutting NNE-SSW through the island between Rothesay Bay and Scalpsie Bay. To the north of this line are metamorphosed sandstones and mudstones (i.e. psammites and pelites) which constitute the Southern Highland Group of the Dalradian. To its south are the conglomerates, sandstones, mudstones and siltstones of the Devonian age Stratheden Group (a division of the Old Red Sandstone) and of the Carboniferous age Inverclyde Group. Associated with the latter are Carboniferous extrusive igneous rocks, mainly lavas and tuffs of the Clyde Plateau Volcanic Formation. These occur north of Ascog, northeast of Scalpsie, and south of Kilchattan Bay.

The metamorphic rocks of the Dalradian sequence are divided locally into a couple of groups, themselves subdivided into formations, each of which contains 'members'. The youngest strata are at the top of the list:

- Trossachs Group
  - Ardscalpsie Formation
    - Quien Hill Grit Member
    - Loch Dhu Slate Member (includes 'Rothesay Limestone')
- Southern Highland Group
  - St Ninian Formation
    - Toward Quay Grit Member
    - Bullrock Greywacke Member
  - Dunoon Phyllite Formation

The Palaeozoic sedimentary and extrusive igneous sequence in stratigraphic order (i.e. youngest at top) is as follows. All are of Carboniferous age except the Bute Conglomerate, which is late Devonian and separated from the overlying Kinnesswood sandstones and mudstones by an unconformity.

- Strathclyde Group
  - Clyde Plateau Volcanic Formation
  - Birgidale Mudstone Formation
- Inverclyde Group
  - Clyde Sandstone Formation
  - Ballagan Formation
  - Kinnesswood Formation
- Stratheden Group
  - Bute Conglomerate Formation

A couple of thin coal seams are recorded within the volcanic sequence inland of Ascog.

The centre of the island is cut by a couple of east–west trending late Carboniferous dykes of quartz-microgabbro and the whole island by a much more numerous swarm of Palaeogene age microgabbro dykes aligned NNW-SSE in the north but also WSW-ESE and NNE-SSW in the south. sills and other intrusive bodies are present in the extreme south.

Raised beaches are present around most of Bute's coastline, lying around 8m above current sea levels. Higher marine platforms with partial cover of sand and gravel are recognised further inland, dating from earlier parts of the Devensian ice age. Till derived from the ice age is widespread inland while isolated peat deposits particularly in the north. Alluvium floors numerous stream valleys. Small areas of blown sand are to be found landward of some sandy bays.

== History ==
=== Neolithic Era ===
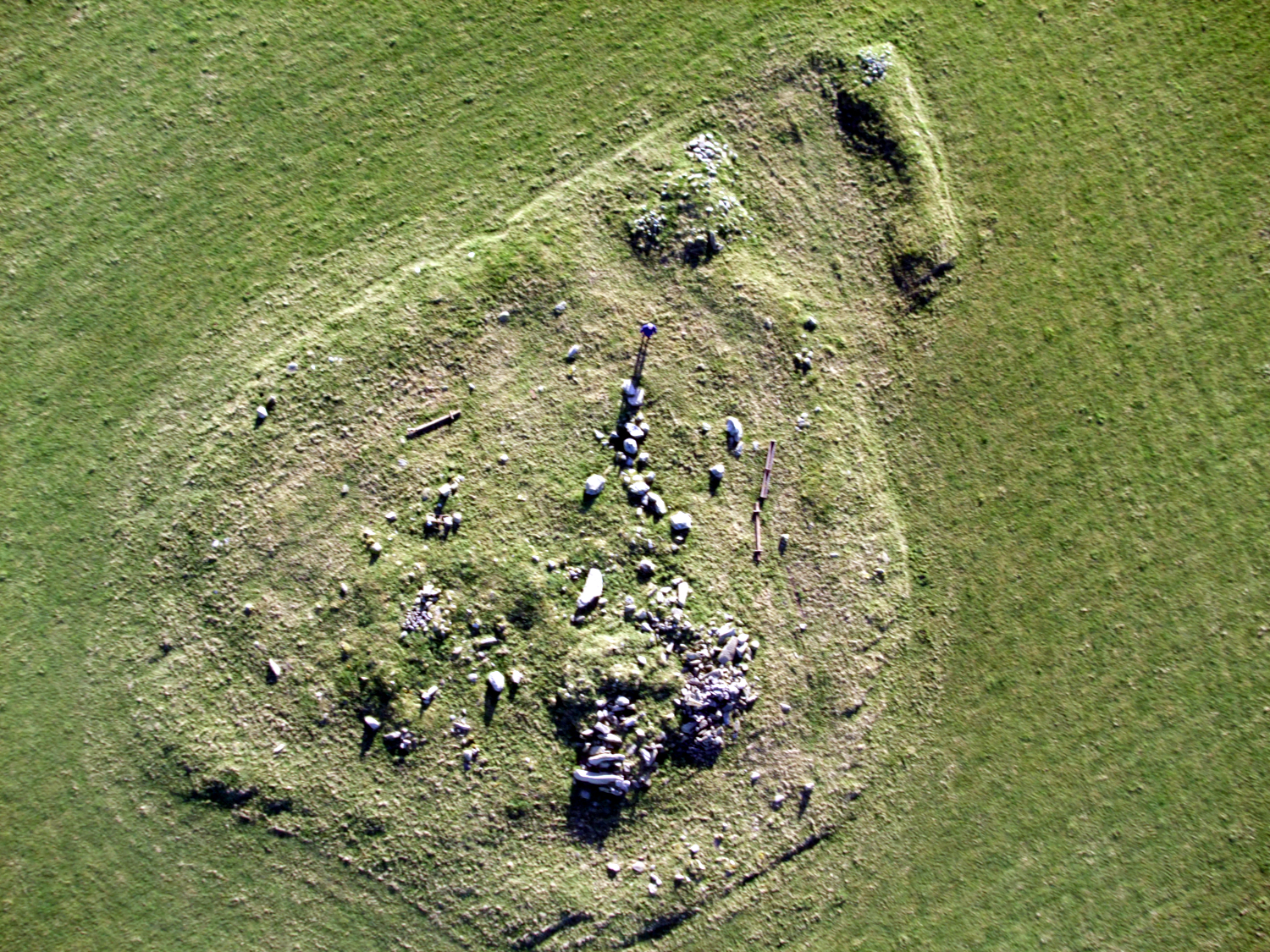
An aerial view of the remains of Scalpsie Cairn

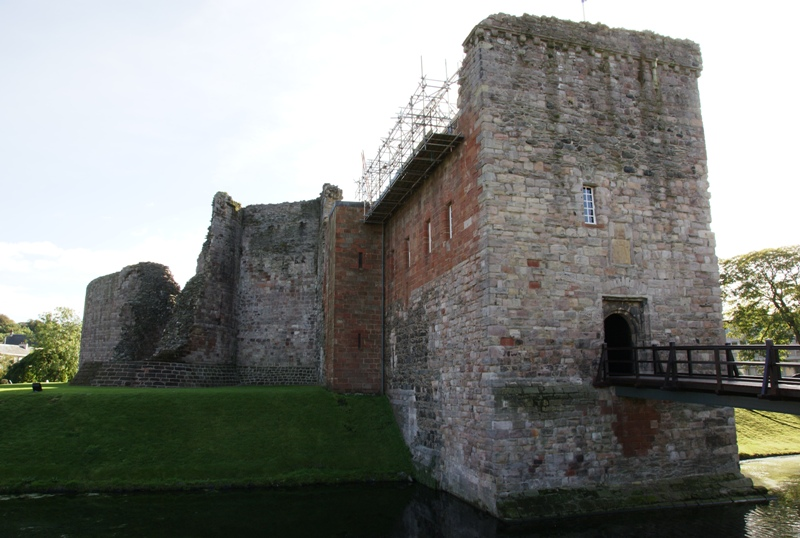
Rothesay Castle

Evidence of early occupation exists in the form of cairns at the north end of the isle, such as the long cairn or Cairnbaan and the white cairn at Lenihuline Wood. Other prehistoric structures are to be found such as a fort complex at Dunagoil. The Kingarth sun circle is estimated to be around 3000 years old.

A well known artifact is the Queen of the Inch necklace, which is an article of jewellery made of jet found in a cist that dates from circa 2000 BC.

=== Dal Riata Era ===
Bute was absorbed into the Cenél Comgaill of Dál Riata and colonised by Gaelic peoples. Saint Maccai (died 460) was said to have founded a monastery on the island.Other well known Gaelic missionaries associated with the island of the 5th and 6th centuries include Cathan whilst the Irish Text Martyrology of Tallaght makes a reference to Blane, the Bishop of Kingarth on Bute, "in Gall-Ghàidheil".

The island subsequently fell under Norse control and formed part of the Kingdom of the Isles, ruled by the Crovan dynasty.

=== Kingdom of the Isles ===
However, in the 12th century, the island, along with Arran, was granted by David I to Somerled, Lord of Argyll, Kintyre and Lorne. At about the turn of the 13th century, Bute appears to have come into possession of the family of the Steward of Scotland, during a time of internal strife amongst Somerled's descendants.

During the 13th century, Bute was the target of two Norwegian attempts to reassert authority in the Isles. For instance, Rothesay Castle fell to a Norwegian-backed King of the Isles in 1230, and fell again to the Norwegians in 1263. In 1266, the Norwegian king, Magnus VI, ceded the Kingdom of the Isles to the Scottish king, Alexander III, in return for a very large sum of money, by the Treaty of Perth. Alexander Stewart of Dundonald had been the chief military commander of Scottish forces at the Battle of Largs, and was now rewarded by King Alexander III by being confirmed in possession of Bute and Arran.

=== Under Scottish rule ===
In 1549, Dean Monro wrote of "Buitt" that it was:

very fertyle ground, namelie for aitts, with twa strenthes; the ane is the round castle of Buitt, callit Rosay of the auld, and Borrowstone about it callit Buitt. Before the town and castle is ane bay of sea, quhilk is a gude heavin for ships to ly upon ankers. That uther castle is callit the castle of Kames, quhilk Kames in Erishe is alsmeikle as to say in English the bay Castle. In this ile ther is twa paroche kirks, that ane southe callit the kirk of Bride, the uther northe in the Borrowstone of Buitt, with twa chappells, ane of them above the towne of Buitt, the uther under the forsaid castle of Kames. (Note: Translation from Scots: "very fertile ground, namely for oats, with two strongholds; one is the round castle of Bute, called Rothesay of old, by Borrowstone. Before the town and castle is a bay of the sea, which is a good haven for ships to lie upon their anchors. That other castle is called the castle of Kames, which translated from Gaelic means 'the bay castle'. In this isle there are two parish churches, that to the south called the kirk of Bride, the other north in the Borrowstone of Bute, with two chapels, one of them above the town of Rothesay, the other under the aforesaid castle of Kames." (The phrase "and Borrowstone about it callit Buitt" does not have a clear meaning. The second use of "Borrowstone" suggests it was a district in north Bute of which Rothesay was a part.))

Under Scottish Rule, Bute and Arran were governed as a unit, the shrievalty aligning with the comital jurisdiction. The latter merged into the crown, as a result of Alexander Stewart's great-grandson, Robert, inheriting the throne via his mother. A corresponding title, Duke of Rothesay was created by Robert's son for the heir apparent, without landlordship of the land. Robert had already granted the sheriffdom to his bastard son, heritably; consequently, in the early 18th century, the latter's senior descendant acquired the (non-comital) title Earl of Bute.

During the seventeenth century, there were accusations of witchcraft: in 1630 an unknown number of women confessed to the crime and were confined in the dungeon at Rothesay Castle, left without food or water, and died from starvation. Other instances are recorded but the most fervent activity occurred during the Great Scottish Witch Hunt of 1661–62 when at least four Bute witches were executed; one woman who was convicted at that time escaped but the sentence was enacted when she returned to the island in 1673.

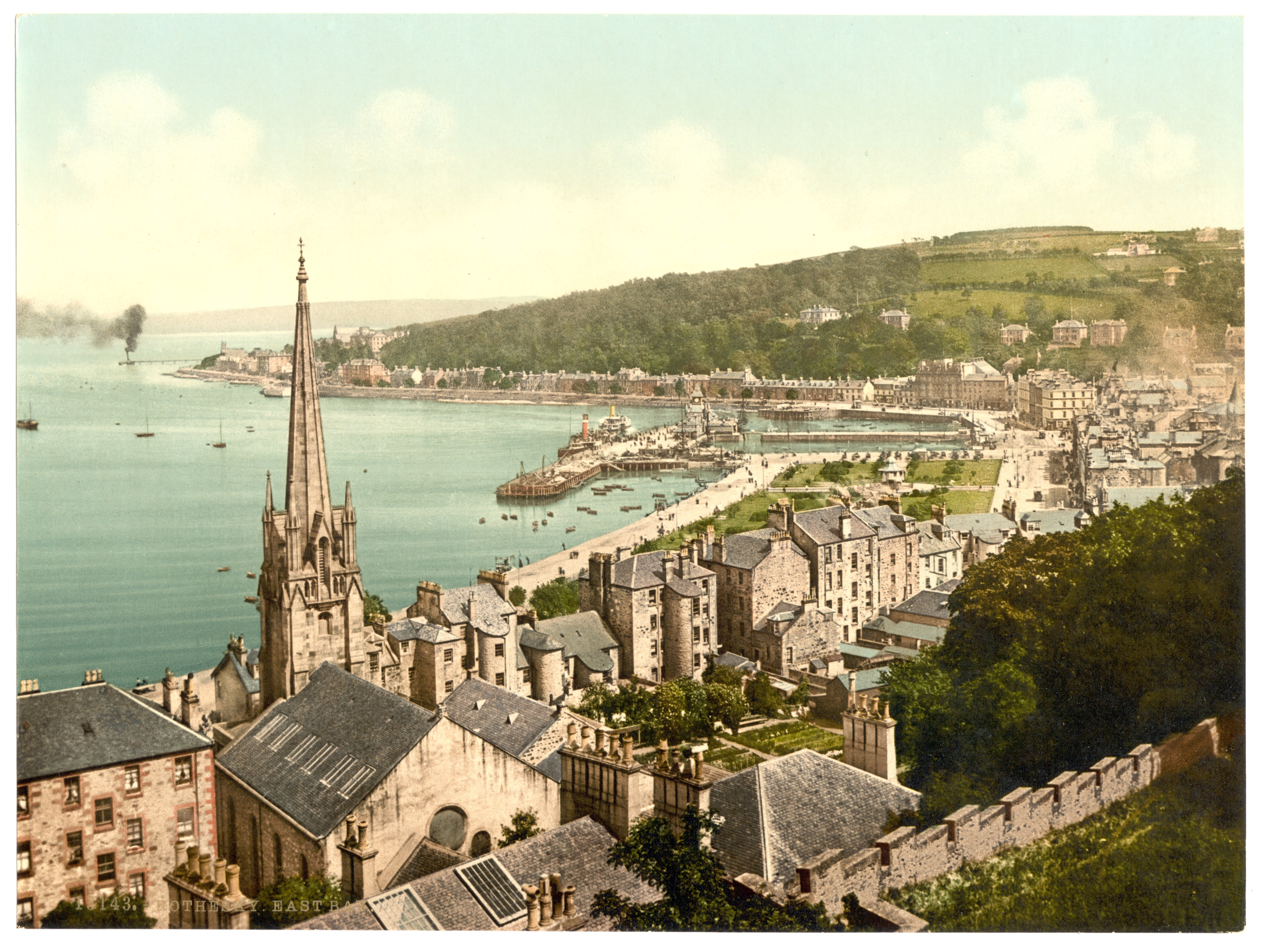
Rothesay at the end of the 19th century

When the comital powers were abolished by the Heritable Jurisdictions (Scotland) Act 1746 and counties formally created, on shrieval boundaries, by the Local Government (Scotland) Act 1889, Bute and Arran became the County of Bute. Later reforms merged Bute, without Arran, into the wider region of Argyll and Bute.

=== World War II ===
Bute played a major role during World War II, and its naval involvements were especially significant. HMS Cyclops was the depot ship for the 7th Submarine Flotilla and was home-based in Rothesay Bay. A few miles further north at Port Bannatyne, the luxury 88-bedroom Kyles Hydro Hotel overlooking the Port, was requisitioned by the Admiralty to serve as the HQ for midget submarine (X-craft) operations. In particular, it was from here (hotel renamed HMS Varbel) that the top secret and audacious attack on the Tirpitz was masterminded.

Much of the training of X-craft submariners was undertaken in the waters around Bute, and especially in the secluded waters of Loch Striven to the north of Port Bannatyne. Bute at War. Bute accommodated many officers and NCOs of the Polish Armed Forces in the West. Officially a military camp, it was unofficially thought of as a prison for Władysław Sikorski's political enemies.

=== 21st century ===
On 2 July 2018, the island was shocked by the murder and rape of 6-year-old girl Alesha MacPhail after she was taken from her bed by a 16-year-old male. The 16-year-old, Aaron Campbell, was caught, charged and convicted, and given a life sentence.

Several major wildfires started on 18–19 April 2019 in the north of the island, involving a substantial area of moorland and conifer plantation.

== Transport ==
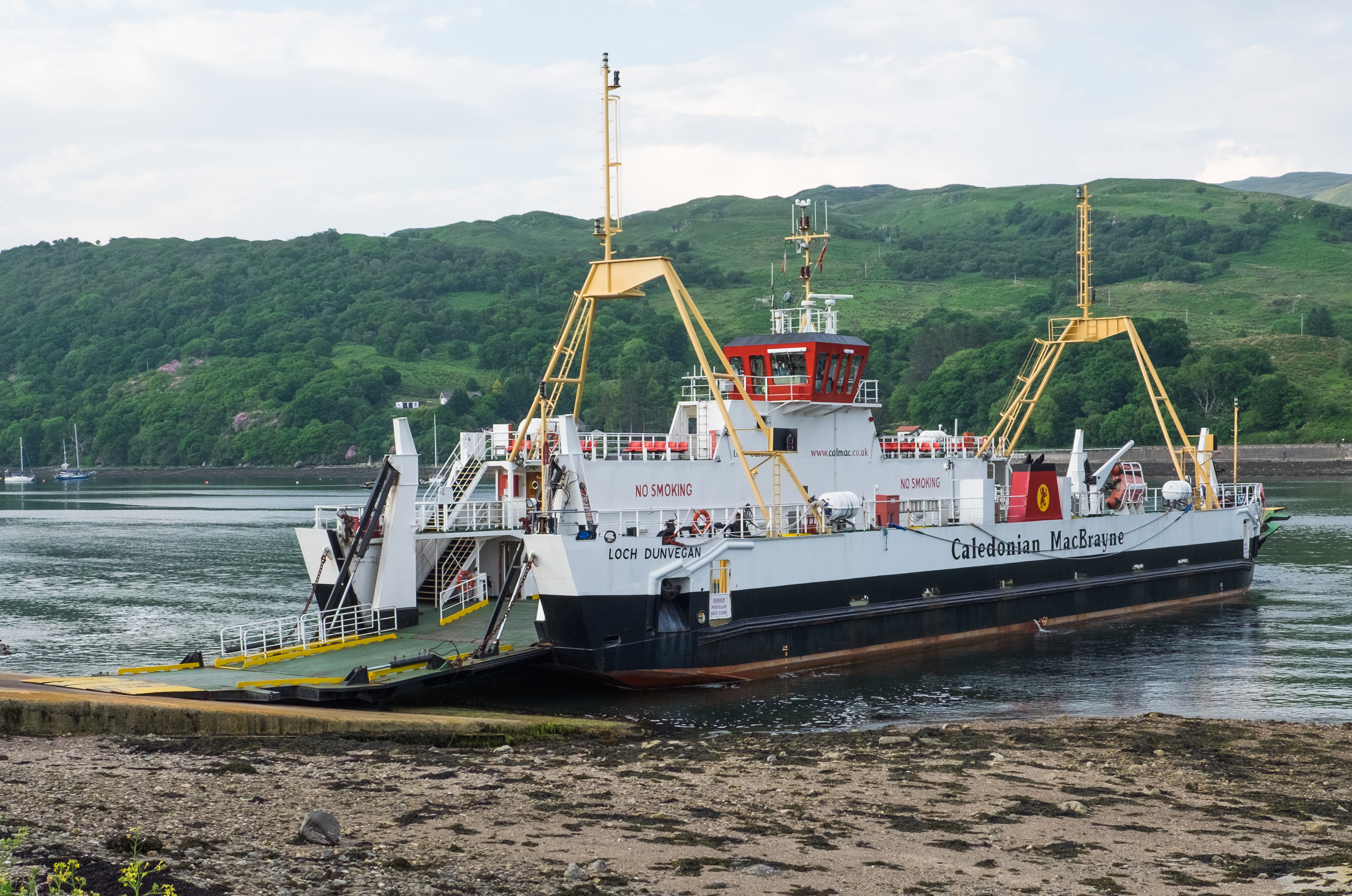
MV Loch Dunvegan at Rhubodach slip

Bute is connected with the Scottish mainland by two Caledonian MacBrayne ferries:

- Rothesay to Wemyss Bay
- Rhubodach to Colintraive

During summer, the paddle steamer Waverley calls at Rothesay on regular cruises.

There is a regular bus service along the eastern coast road, and a daily service connecting the island with Argyll and the western Highlands and Islands. Many independent holidaymakers use the island as a stepping stone from Glasgow and Ayrshire to western Scotland using this route. In summer an open-top bus tours the island leaving from Guildford Square by the ferry at 1030, 1200, 1430, and 1600.

The main ferry to the island leaves from Wemyss Bay, a village on the A78, the coast road between Glasgow and Ayr. Wemyss Bay is connected with trains running to Glasgow Central station. On the same line is Paisley Gilmor Street which provides a bus link to Glasgow Airport.

Loch Lomond Seaplanes provided an occasional link between Glasgow Pacific Quay and Port Bannatyne Marina, a journey time of 17 minutes. The company ceased trading on 11 April 2025.

== Education ==
The island has one secondary school, Rothesay Academy, which moved to a new modern joint campus with Rothesay Primary in 2007. The largest of the island's three primary schools is Rothesay Primary. The smallest school (with roughly 50 pupils) is North Bute Primary in Port Bannatyne. The third primary school, St Andrews Primary, is a Catholic School aligned with St Andrew's Church, the only Catholic Church on the predominantly Protestant island.

== Sport ==
Bute has many sports clubs and activities available. There are three golf courses: Rothesay Golf Club, Kingarth Golf Club and Port Bannatyne Golf Club. The most successful sporting club on the island is Bute Shinty Club who play at the highest level of shinty (the Marine Harvest Premier League).

In 2006, Bute won promotion to the Premier League by winning the South Division One. Bute also won the Ballimore Cup and were runners-up in the Glasgow Celtic Society Cup in 2006. The local amateur football team are known as the Brandanes, and the junior team are the Brandane Bulls. Bute also has facilities for fishing, rugby, tennis, bowls, and cricket. Pétanque is played at Port Bannatyne; boules may be hired from the Post Office there.

The centre for sailing on Bute is at Port Bannatyne with two boatyards and the new marina, and a club which organises private moorings in these particularly protected waters of Kames Bay. There is Bute Sailing School with its own yacht.

== Economy ==
The Mount Stuart Trust owns 28,000 acres (11,000 hectares) on the island: as of 2012, the trust was wholly controlled by five members of the Marquess of Bute's family, plus an accountant and lawyer, none of whom lived on Bute. As of 2019, all 12 of the trust's directors had addresses outside the island.

Farming and tourism are the main industries on the island, along with fishing and forestry. Privately owned businesses include Port Bannatyne Marina and Boat Yard, the Ardmaleish Boatbuilding Company and Bute Fabrics Ltd (an international weaver of contemporary woollen fabrics for upholstery and vertical applications).

In December 2015, Bute became home to about 100 Syrians, making the island one of the largest recipients of these refugees in the UK relative to its population. Argyll and Bute council stated that the island was chosen as a suitable location because it had "available social housing" and is "closer to the central belt" for medical support. These newcomers have started up highly successful shops.

In 2019, The Buteman, the island's weekly newspaper, closed after 165 years, due to a fall in readership. This was replaced by the Isle of Bute News, run by the Dunoon Observer.

== Attractions ==
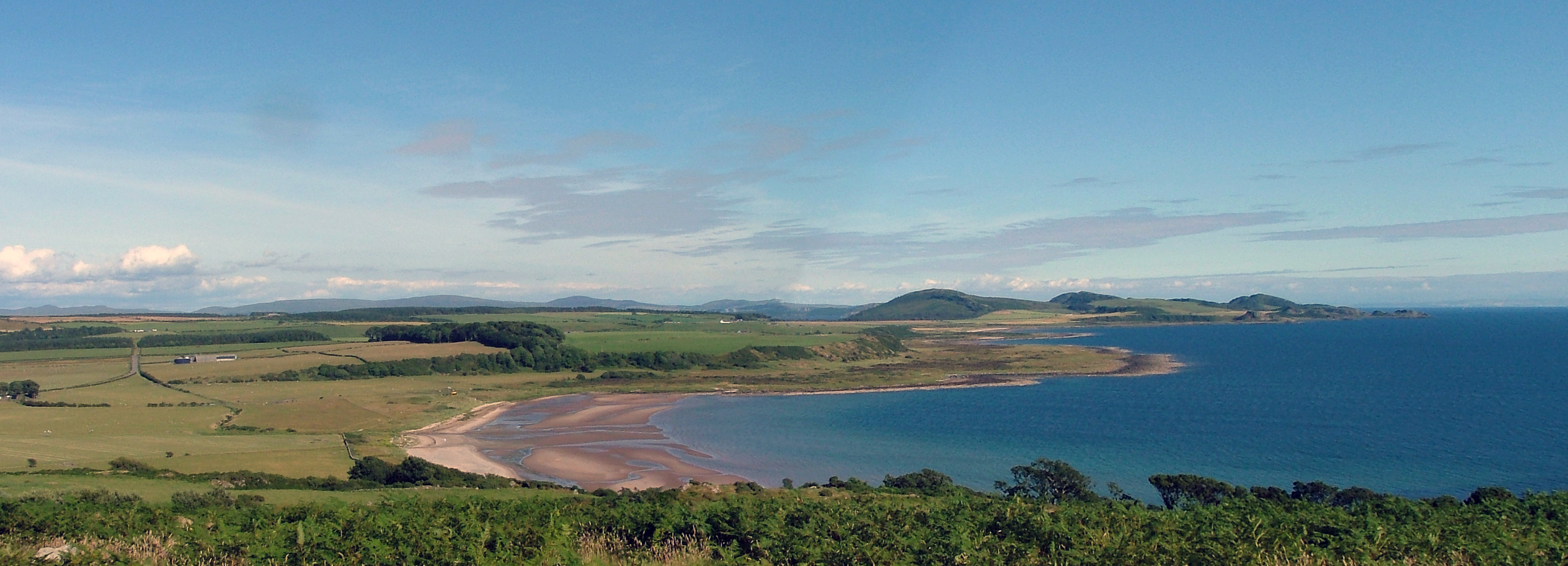
Scalpsie Bay and raised beach looking south to the three hills Suidhe Chatain, Tor Mòr and Suidhe Bhlain.

=== Architectural attractions ===
The island has a ruined 12th-century chapel called St Blane's chapel which stands on a site associated with Saint Catan and Saint Blane, who was born on Bute. Another ruined chapel, dating from the 6th century, lies at St Ninian's Point.

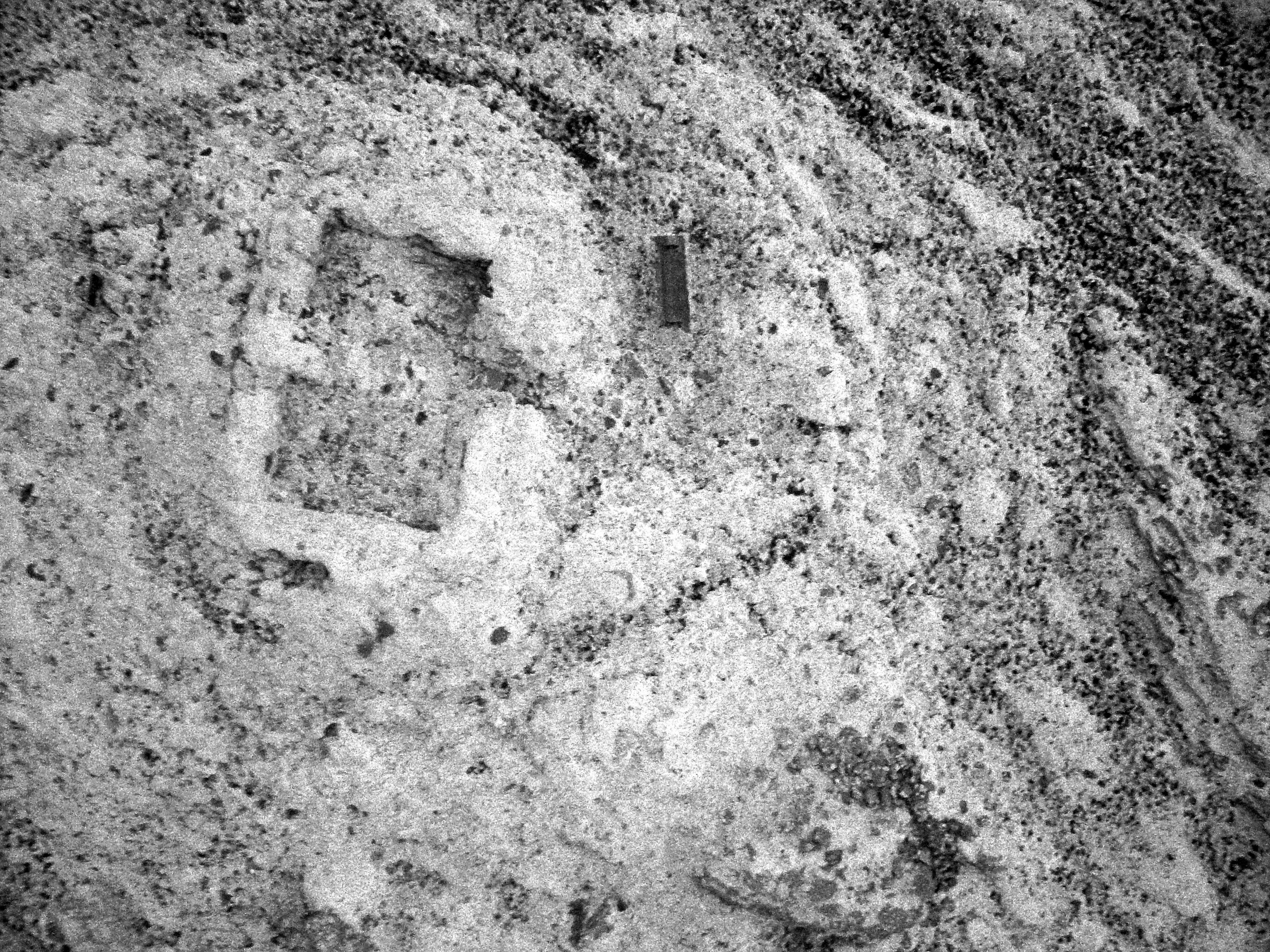
A near-infrared aerial photo of St. Ninian's Chapel.

The eccentric Mount Stuart House is often cited as one of the world's most impressive neo-Gothic mansions, bringing many architectural students from Glasgow on day trips. The third Marquess had a passion for art, astrology, mysticism, and religion, and the house reflects this in the architecture, furnishings, and art collection. There is a marble chapel, much stained glass, and walls of paintings. The house is open at Easter and from May to October. There are gardens with plants imported from many parts of the world and a visitor centre. The gardens host a number of events throughout the year starting with an Easter Parade.

In 2003 the fashion designer Stella McCartney married in the chapel, generating intense media interest. Activities and workshops are often held there in the summer by a local organisation that provides after-school clubs and activities in the school holidays; there is also a farmers' market and a Christmas market held in the house and in the visitor centre. In 2016, a previously uncatalogued copy of Shakespeare's First Folio was authenticated in the Mount Stuart House library.

The Pavilion is a 1930s edifice housing a concert hall, workshops and café, and is noted for its architecture. It was little changed from when it was built in 1938. Renovation of the building was halted in 2021 following the administration of the main contractor during the 2020 pandemic. Work restarted in May 2023, with the first stage works expected to be competed in August 2024. It is anticipated that restoration will be complete by January 2026.

Rothesay Castle was built 800 years ago by the hereditary High Steward of Scotland.

Ascog Hall Fernery and Gardens are a renovated Victorian residence and glass house containing shrubs and plants from all over the Empire, including a fern believed to be over 1,000 years old.

The Old Post Office, now used only for sorting mail, is a historic working post office (open mornings only) that houses artefacts of the early post, some from before the advent of the postage stamp.

=== Tourist locations ===
Loch Fad is a deep freshwater loch stocked with pike and brown trout, and is available to visiting tourist fishermen. Boats are available to hire.

Scalpsie Bay has a colony of over 200 seals on its beach, which can only be reached on foot across the fields. The island also has many herds of deer, rich bird life and some large hares. Wild goats with large curled horns may be seen in the north of the island.

Port Bannatyne, a village towards the north of the island, is the centre for sailing and sea-fishing on the island. It has two boatyards and a marina for 200 vessels. Langoustines are fished with creels anchored in the bay. X-Class midget submarines were stationed in Kames Bay during World War II and there is a memorial to World War II dead. Port Bannatyne Golf Club is known for scenic views from the course.

The road from Port Bannatyne goes seven miles (11 kilometres) along the shore of the Kyles of Bute to the small ferry to Colintraive on the Argyll mainland.

=== Rothesay ===
The 1920s Winter Gardens (now the "Discovery Centre") close to the Rothesay Pier houses a small cinema and tourist information office. Nearby are the Victorian toilets.

There are a variety of music, folk, and poetry festivals, as well as walking trails and new cycling routes.

=== Heritage ===
There are some remote Bronze Age stone circles, an Iron Age fortified village, and early Christian remains (including St. Blane's Chapel). The Bute Museum of the island's history is situated behind Rothesay Castle.

=== Walks ===
The West Island Way is a waymarked long distance footpath that opened in September 2000 as part of Bute's millennium celebrations, and was the first waymarked long-distance route on a Scottish island. It is 48 kilometres (30 mi) in length, running between Kilchattan Bay in the south of the island and Port Bannatyne in the north, with Rothesay as a central point.

== Notable people ==
Notable Bute people include:

- Nina Allan, writer
- Richard Attenborough, film director; owned the Rhubodach estate on the island at one time
- Andrew Blain Baird, aviation pioneer
- Blane, 6th-century Irish missionary
- Lieutenant Henry Robertson (Birdie) Bowers (1883–1912), polar explorer, who died with Scott in the Antarctic
- Cathan, 6th-century Irish missionary
- Adam Crozier, former chief executive of the Royal Mail
- Johnny Dumfries, 7th Marquess of Bute, Formula One racing driver and 1988 24 Hours of Le Mans winner
- Thomas Bannatyne Gillies, New Zealand Supreme Court judge
- Angela Haggerty, journalist, author and broadcaster
- George Leslie Hunter, colourist painter
- Ian Jack, writer, journalist
- Edmund Kean, Shakespearean actor
- Maccai, 5th-century Irish missionary
- Sir William Macewen FRS (1848–1924), surgeon
- John William Mackail, writer and scholar
- Chanel O'Conor, drag queen
- Christopher Priest, writer
- Jane Ross, international footballer
- John Sterling, critic, journalist and poet
- Hector Whitelaw, shinty player and Scotland vice-captain
- Bob Winter, Glasgow's Lord Provost (2007–2012)
- Lena Zavaroni (1963–1999), singer; raised in Rothesay

== See also ==
- List of islands of Scotland
- Bute mazer
