= Bute witches =

Group of Scottish women accused of witchcraft

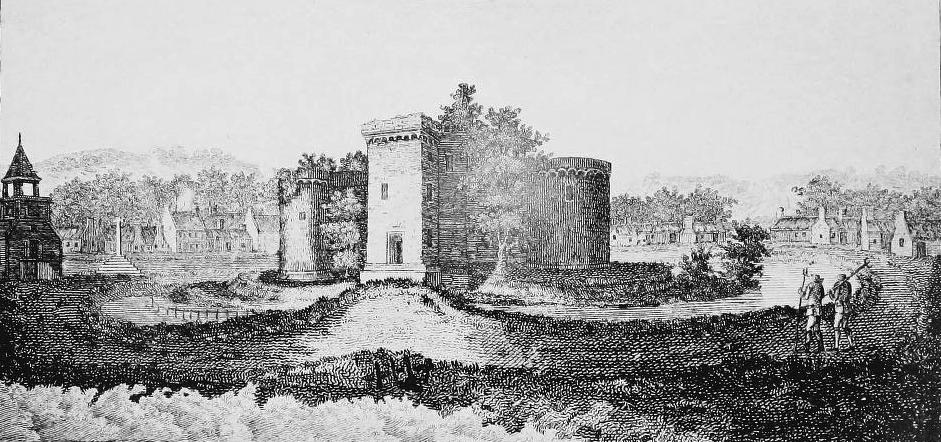
Rothesay Castle and tolbooth c. 1680

The Bute witches were six Scottish women accused of witchcraft and interrogated in the parish of Rothesay on Bute during the Great Scottish Witch Hunt of 1661–62. The Privy Council granted a Commission of Justiciary for a local trial to be held and four of the women – believed by historians to be Margaret McLevin, Margaret McWilliam, Janet Morrison (Note: Spelled as Jonet Morisone in the original document reproduced by James R. N. MacPhail.) and Isobell McNicoll – were executed in 1662; a fifth may have died while incarcerated. One woman, Janet NcNicol, escaped from prison before she could be executed but when she returned to the island in 1673 the sentence was implemented.

== Background ==
The early modern period saw the Scottish courts trying many cases of witchcraft with witch hunts beginning in about 1550. Prior to the fervent activity in 1662, generally the numerically small, tightly-knit, population of islanders on Bute did not encounter the scale of witch hunting experienced throughout the rest of Scotland. Records indicate the only instances of formal witch persecution on the island took place between the 1630s and 1670s although the documents may be incomplete. In 1630 after a group of women – their names and the exact number are not known – confessed to witchcraft, they were confined in the dungeon of Rothesay Castle without food or water and starved to death.

A strong belief in fairy traditions and folklore persisted in Scotland during the seventeenth century despite being subjected to nearly a hundred years of vigorous oppression. The Kirk session in Rothesay heard a complaint against Jeane Campbell in 1660 as it was claimed she went with the fairies who had instructed her how to make spells; she was also accused of applying "a salve to rub on her breast, which was good for comforting the heart against scunners [afflictions]." It was discovered she suffered from indigestion so the local minister allayed the fears of his congregation regarding her involvement in witchcraft. The following year she was brought before the session again after she used the cure on others; she was discharged but informed she would be deemed a witch if she repeated the offence. Ten years earlier, in 1650, another woman, Finwell Hyndman from Kingarth, was interviewed as she went missing for a day every three months; when she returned she had such a repugnant smell no one could approach her and it seemed she had been on a long journey. As she offered no adequate reason for her absence, she was "bruted for a witch or (as the commone people calls it) being with the fayryes". (Note: Henderson and Cowan speculate her absence was due to adultery; Hewison records that "she soon brought home a little fairy of her own to nurse.")

In common with other European witch trials, major Scottish witch hunts occurred in batches; historians offer differing opinions as to why this should happen but generally agree that military hostilities and political or economic uncertainty played a part coupled with local ministers and landowners determined to seek convictions. The execution of King Charles I took place in 1649 and an extensive witch hunt started that year. Charles II was declared the monarch of Scotland in 1660; most historians connect the Great Scottish Witch Hunt of 1661–62, the last but most severe wave of prosecutions, with the Restoration. The hunt started in small towns and villages near Edinburgh during April 1661 spreading to Bute with a succession of accusations and trials beginning in early 1662. Some of the charges, including those against Margaret McWilliam, concerned events that had happened over twenty years before.

== Events leading up to the trials ==
The series of events on the island in 1662 were initiated following disagreements between neighbours, a common scenario for the instigation of witchcraft cases. John McFie accused his neighbour Margaret McWilliam of witchcraft. He alleged she caused him to suffer pains resembling those of giving birth; the ailment started shortly after he had an altercation with her and continued for three months. McFie also claimed she was responsible for the sudden death of one of his children a few hours after the child became ill. McWilliam had been regarded as a witch by the community for more than thirty years; the women who confessed to witchcraft that starved to death in Rothesay Castle in 1630 claimed she was a witch and she had been imprisoned in 1631.

== Investigation ==
The first recorded statement given by any of the accused women was from Janet Morrison at her home on 15 January 1662.

== Aftermath ==
Jonet NcNicoll escaped from the tolbooth in Rothesay during 1662 and fled to Kilmarnock where she lived for the next twelve years. She returned to the island in 1673 and was executed for the 1662 conviction alongside another woman, Mary NcThomas, who had been found guilty of incest and charming. These two executions were the last recorded cases of witch persecution on the island.
