= Janet McNicol =

- Died: 24 October 1673
- Cause of death: Strangled and burned
- Known for: Accused witch

Location of the Isle of Bute

Janet McNicol (24 October 1673) was one of the Bute Witches, who was arrested in 1662 accused of witchcraft. She was imprisoned in the tolbooth, Rothesay on the Isle of Bute off the west coast of Scotland.

== Escape from prison and Bute ==
McNicol managed to escape from the tolbooth in 1662 and evaded trial and execution. She absconded to Kilmarnock and returned to Bute in 1673 where she was consequently re-arrested, imprisoned and tried.

== The trial ==
McNicol’s trial started on 15 October 1673, and she confessed that the Devil had appeared to her as a leper and that she knew them to be an evil spirit. She admitted that she had encountered two men,

“one was a gross copperfaced man whom she knew was an evil spirit, the other was a well favoured young man”

During her trial, no torture was recorded.

=== Demonic Pact ===
McNicol admitted to making a demonic pact with the devil by having an anti-baptism and was renamed Mary Lykeas. During this pact she agreed to be a servant of the devil, meaning that she would fulfil services for them and that the Devil ensured that she will 'want nothing' and that they would provide everything for her.

=== Witch meetings ===
During her trial, McNicol confessed to attending witch gatherings at Bute Quay with other people and that the Devil was present. She said at one of these meetings,

"she fell in the water but the good looking man pulled her out."

== Execution ==
McNicol was strangled and burned to death on the gallows at Rothesay on 15 October 1673. She was executed alongside Mary McThomas, who was also accused of witchcraft. These two executions were the last recorded cases of witch persecution on the island.
