= Loch Fad =

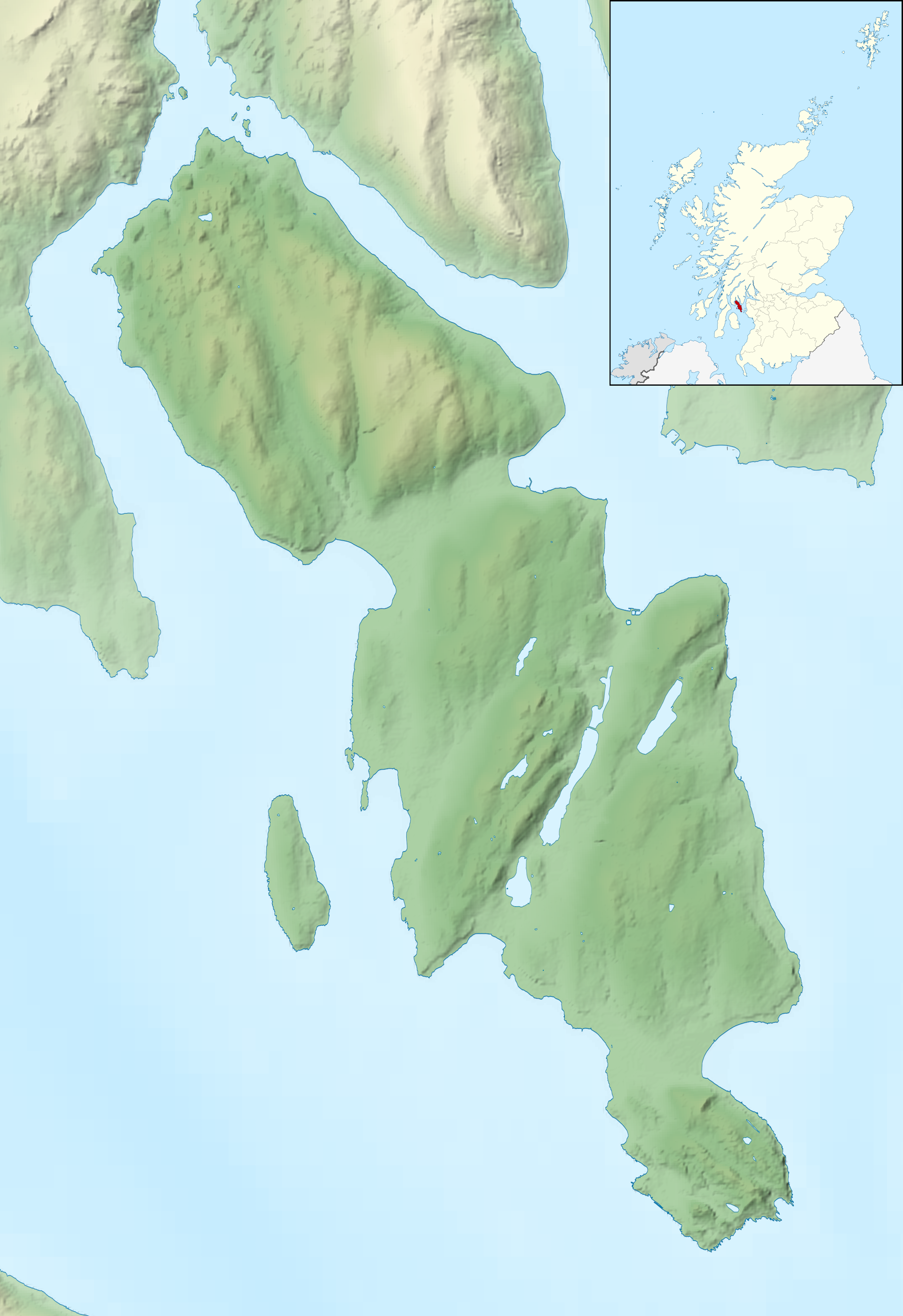
- Location within Bute
- Location: Isle of Bute, Scotland
- Coordinates: 55.806°N 5.074°W
- Type: loch

Loch Fad is a freshwater loch on the Isle of Bute in Scotland.

Its name means "long loch" in Scottish Gaelic. It lies on the Highland Boundary Fault.

== Glacial lake and artificial dam ==
The ribbon-shaped lake has a length of almost 3 km and a width of 200 to 400 metres. Its deepest point is near the middle of the length.

Adjoining to the north east end of this natural lake, hydrologically downstream, there is an artificial lake named Kirk Dam. It has the same water level. Both lakes are classified together as one water body. Its surface area is 71 hectares (180 acres), fairly large for a freshwater loch on an island in Scotland. It discharges into a canal to Rothesay, in the town centre hidden in a pipe.

== Fish and sports ==
It is the site of one of the largest rainbow trout cage farms in the UK.

In 2018, it was used for tests of Donald Campbell's boat, Bluebird.

== Weblinks ==
- UK Lakes Portal: Loch Fad or Kirk Dam, Water body ID 26275
