= Sound of Bute =

Body of water in the Firth of Clyde, Scotland

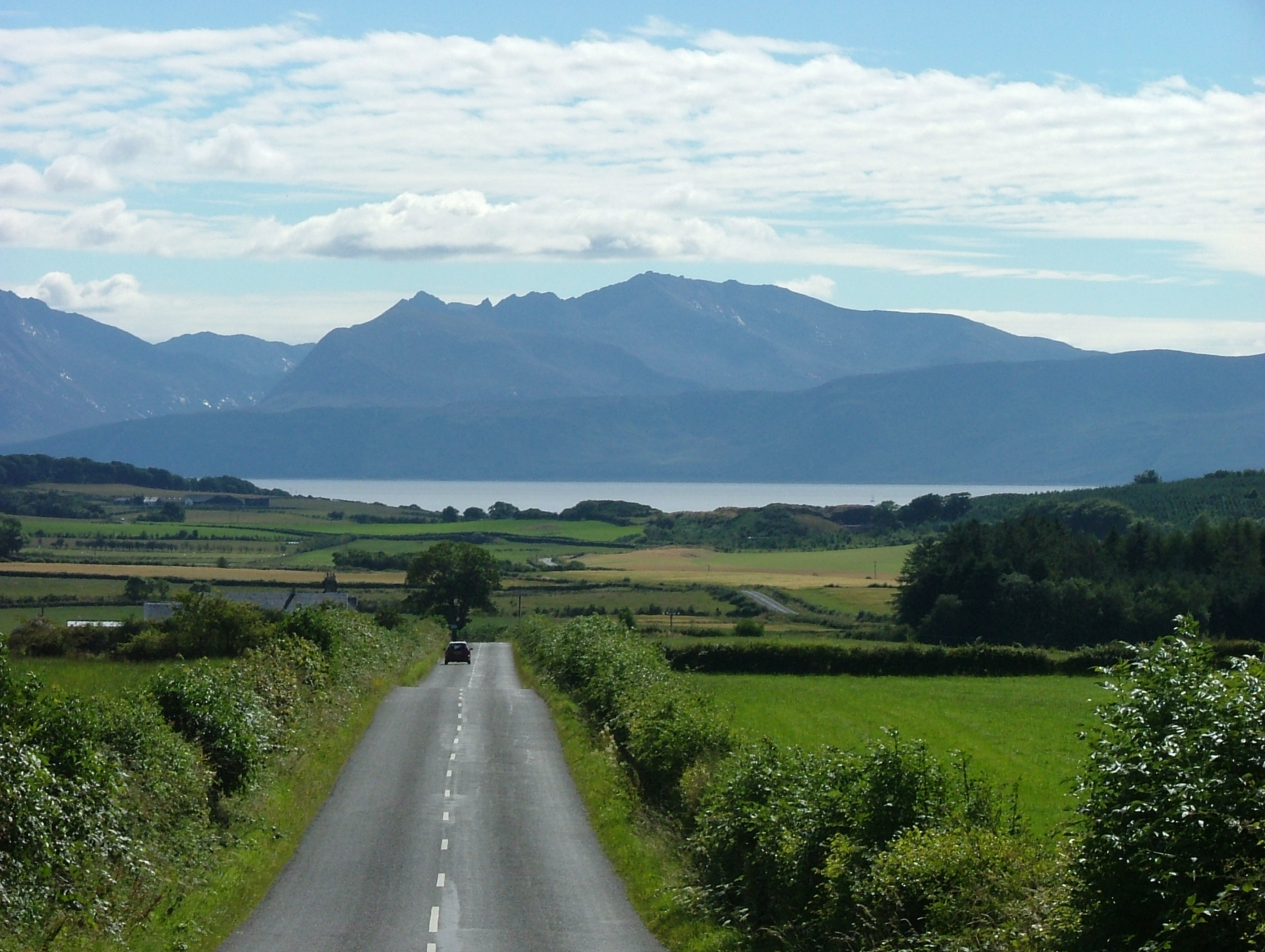
- The Sound of Bute seen from the West Road on the Isle of Bute.

- Location within Scotland
- Location: Firth of Clyde
- Coordinates: 55°45′09″N 5°8′51″W
- Type: Sound
- Frozen: No

The Sound of Bute is a broad sound, separating the islands of Arran and Bute, on the west coast of Scotland. The sound leads up from the lower Firth of Clyde and passes the island of Inchmarnock. Then splits into the Kyles of Bute, Loch Fyne and round the north end of island of Arran into the Kilbrannan Sound.
