= Inchmarnock =

Island on the west coast of Scotland

Innis Mhearnaig (Gaelic)
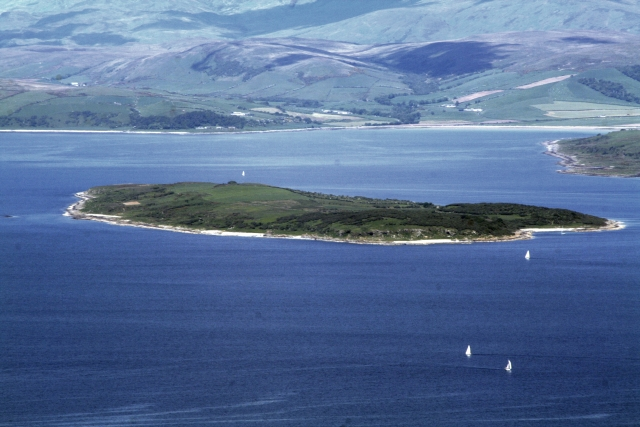

Location
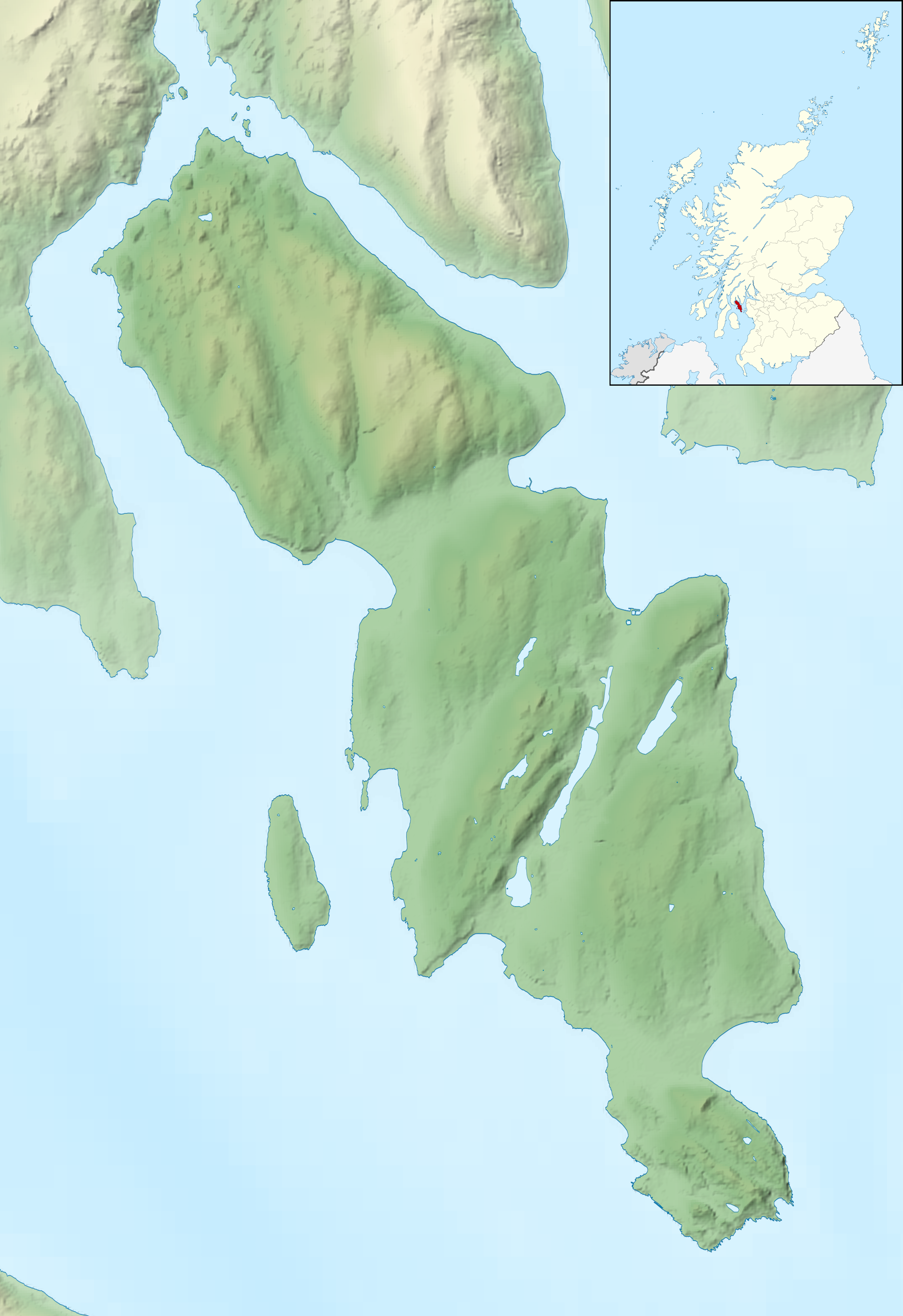
- Inchmarnock shown next to Bute Inchmarnock shown in Argyll and Bute
- OS grid reference: NS020598
- Coordinates: 55.79°N 05.16°W

Name
- Name meaning: Island of St. Marnock

Physical geography
- Island group: Islands of the Clyde
- Area: 266 ha (660 acres)
- Area rank: 93
- Highest elevation: 60 m (197 ft)

Administration
- Council area: Argyll and Bute
- Country: Scotland
- Sovereign state: United Kingdom

Demographics
- Population: 0

Inchmarnock (Scottish Gaelic: Innis Mheàrnaig) is an island at the northern end of the Sound of Bute in the Firth of Clyde, on the west coast of Scotland. The island is privately owned.

== Geography ==
Inchmarnock lies to the west of the Isle of Bute at the northern end of the Sound of Bute. It is around 3.5 kilometres (2 1/4 mi) long and rises to a height of 60 metres (197 ft). The island consists mainly of a single ridge running north to south. It is partially wooded and has sea caves at the north and the south and two tiny lochans inland.

The island belongs to the traditional county of Bute and the modern unitary authority of Argyll and Bute. It is not to be confused with Inchmarnock in Aberdeenshire. Divided into three farms, Southpark, Midpark and Northpark, only the last is currently inhabited. A short reef of drying rocks, Tràigh na h-Uil, skirts the island's west coast. The island gives its name to Inchmarnock Water, the body of water that lies between the island's western shore and the Kintyre peninsula. Inchmarnock Water connects the Sound of Bute and the Kilbrannan Sound in the south to Loch Fyne and the Kyles of Bute in the north.

== History ==
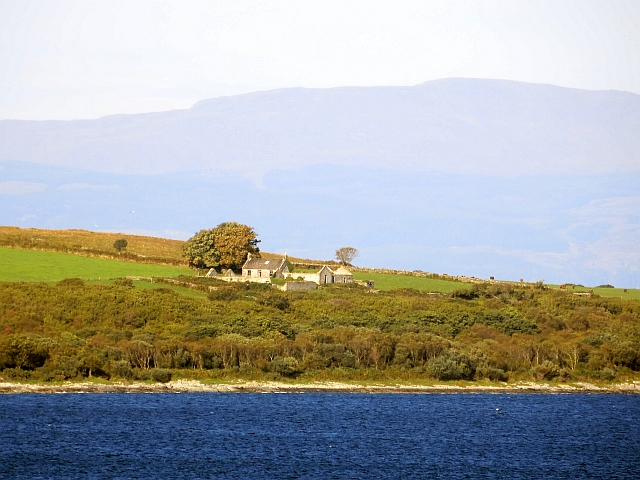
Northpark, one of three farmsteads on the island

The island's name is an anglicisation of the Gaelic Innis Mheàrnaig meaning Island of Marnock. Marnock, (Old Irish M'Ernóc, 'My [i.e. 'Saint'] Little Ernán) was a holy man who lived on the island in the 7th century and established a monastery. Alternatively, the name may simply be a dedication to Ernán and reflect the patron saint the monks on the island followed. He has also lent his name to a number of other locations:

- Kilmarnock, a town on the Scottish mainland
- Portmarnock, a town on the eastern coast of Ireland
- Dalmarnock, an area in the east end of Glasgow

At the northern end of the island a Bronze Age cist contains the remains of a female skeleton, the Queen of the Inch. The remains were removed for carbon dating and are now displayed behind a pane of glass in their original position.

Local legend has it that in the 19th century drunks from Rothesay were left on Inchmarnock to dry out by means of "isolation and deprivation".

During World War II, when Bute was being used for extensive military training, the 9th Scottish Commando and the French Canadians used Inchmarnock as part of Bute's training exercises for tank landing craft in preparation for D-Day.

A report in 2019 stated that the island – measuring 4 km (2 1/2 mi) across at its longest, and with a coastline of 7.5 km (4 3/4 mi) – contained a farmhouse that had been vacated decades earlier, three small stone buildings, as well as "crabs, migratory birds, grey seals, otters, ... and red deer". It was farmed for some years. Other reports from that year added that the island was once "home to 41 residents but the final permanent resident ... left the island in 1986" and that Lord Smith of Kelvin had purchased the island in 1999. He has since done some land restoration and added 230 cows: "Highland cattle and a Highland cross Beef Shorthorn commercial suckler beef herd".

=== The Inchmarnock Project ===
The Inchmarnock Project was a seven-year study, commencing in 1999, of the archaeology and history of the island from the earliest times down to the Improvements of the late 18th and early 19th centuries. It was undertaken by Headland Archaeology and funded by Lord Smith of Kelvin, the owner of Inchmarnock. Within this long chronology of activity some periods are better represented than others, but the highlight of the project was the excavation in and around the medieval church which lies in the stack-yard at Midpark.

Excavation to the north of St Marnock's church revealed the remains of what is interpreted as an early monastic enclosure, together with a number of workshops and an exceptional number of pieces of inscribed slate. Provisionally dated to the 8th or 9th century AD, possibly continuing later, this is the largest assemblage of such material known from Scotland. It includes examples of abstract designs and casual graffiti but also what are clearly practice pieces for the composition of more complex designs. As 'pattern books' for the creation of designs in other media, the site potentially offers the opportunity of understanding better the context in which this material was produced. Many of the slates were found in association with debris from metal-working processes.

Literacy at the site was attested by a number of fragments with practice writing, as well as one example with a piece of readable text. There are clear indications that the monks who resided on the island were teaching novices the various skills expected of young monastic scholars. Among the inscriptions are examples of Gaelic, Latin and ogham script. Other inscribed slates from the site provide insights into the dress, weaponry, buildings and ship technology of the time.

The 'Hostage Stone'

Two conjoining fragments of incised slate had a particularly interesting series of images. The 'Hostage Stone' comprises a larger fragment and a smaller one, discovered in two separate seasons of excavation not far from each other. Together the piece measures 180 by 120 by 12 mm (7 by 4 3/4 by 1/2 in), although it was perhaps originally slightly bigger and a portion of it may have been lost. On the face of the stone are four human figures, all facing to the right, along with a boat and a number of other miscellaneous marks.

In his recent work on the excavation, Chris Lowe, the project director, indicates there has been extensive discussion on the meaning of this scene and highlights the difference in the stance and attitude of the three figures on the right of the stone compared to the one on the left. The three on the right also appear to be wearing mail armour. In this context the image appears to depict slave-raiding or hostage-taking, with the figure on the left a monk potentially being led away. An alternative interpretation is put forward by Katherine Forsyth of the University of Glasgow, who suggests that the scene may represent the procession of a reliquary by an ecclesiastical figure, with the armed individuals providing protection.

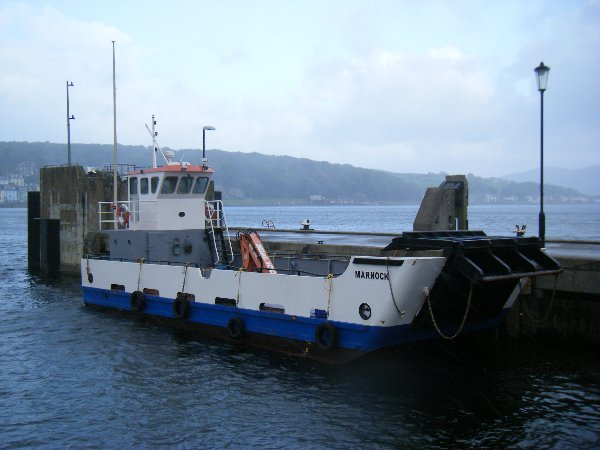
MV Marnock, at Rothesay pier

The results of the Inchmarnock Project were published by Society of Antiquaries of Scotland in September 2008.

Today, Inchmarnock is run as an organic farm and a population of organic Highland cattle has been introduced. A dedicated ferry, MV Marnock, was built locally (at Ardmaleish on Bute) to provide a service to the island.

== Wildlife ==
Inchmarnock is home to the largest colony of herring gulls in the Firth of Clyde and is a wintering ground for greylag geese.

== See also ==
- List of islands of Scotland
