= Maccai =

Irish missionary

Saint Maccai
- Born: Ireland
- Died: 460
- Canonized: Pre-congregation
- Feast: 11 April

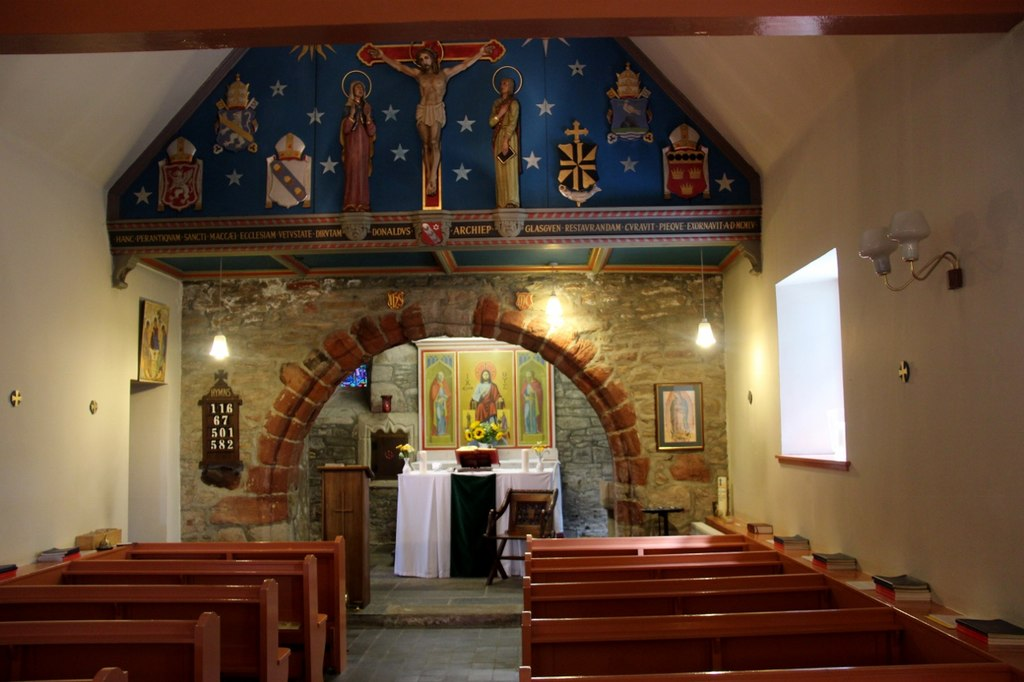
Interior of St Mahew's Chapel, Cardross, Scotland

Saint Maccai (or Machai, Maccæus, Mahew) was an Irish missionary who founded a monastery on the Isle of Bute, Scotland. His feast day is 11 April.

== Attestations ==
=== Monks of Ramsgate account ===
The Monks of Ramsgate wrote in their Book of Saints (1921),

Machai (St.) Abbot (April 11)
(5th century) A disciple of Saint Patrick who founded a monastery in the Isle of Bute.

=== Butler's account ===
The hagiographer Alban Butler (1710–1773) wrote in his Lives of the Fathers, Martyrs, and Other Principal Saints under April 11,

Saint Maccai, Abbot, a disciple of Saint Patrick, who flourished in the isle of Bute, in Scotland, and was there honoured after his death. See Bp. Lesley's nephew, De Vitis Sanctor. Scot. p. 235.

=== O'Hanlon's account ===
John O'Hanlon (1821–1905) wrote of Babolin in his Lives of the Irish Saints under April 11.

ARTICLE XII.-REPUTED FESTIVAL OF MACCAEUS VATES, ISLAND OF BUTE, SCOTLAND. In the Island of Bute, Thomas Dempster places Maccaeus, a prophet, as also, a disciple to St. Patrick, Apostle of the Irish, and, at the 11th of April. For this account, he quotes a Scottish Breviary. By Dempster, Macaeus is called, likewise, a sweet poet, a medicus and a distinguished mathematician. He is said to have written, De Recipiendis Lapsis, Lib. i., De Fide Persevetante, Lib. i., De Indiciis Nativitatum, Lib. i. His life ended, according to Dempster, in the year 460. Ferrarius follows the foregoing account, in his notes, and the Bollandists record him, at the present date. Quoting Bishop Lesley's nephew, and his work, the Rev. Alban Butler enters St. Maccai, Abbot, at the 11th of April, when his feast is found, likewise, in the Circle of the Seasons. Some notices of him are to be met with, in the work of Bishop Forbes.

== Sources ==
- Butler, Alban (1798), The Lives of the Primitive Fathers, Martyrs, and Other Principal Saints, vol. IV, J. Moir This article incorporates text from this source, which is in the public domain.
- O'Hanlon, John (1875), Lives of the Irish saints, vol. 4, Dublin: James Duffy This article incorporates text from this source, which is in the public domain.
- St. Augustine's Abbey, Ramsgate (1921). The Book of saints : a dictionary of servants of God canonized by the Catholic Church. London: A. & C. Black, ltd. OCLC 671676136. This article incorporates text from this source, which is in the public domain.
