= Ettrick Bay =

Bay on the Isle of Bute, west coast of Scotland

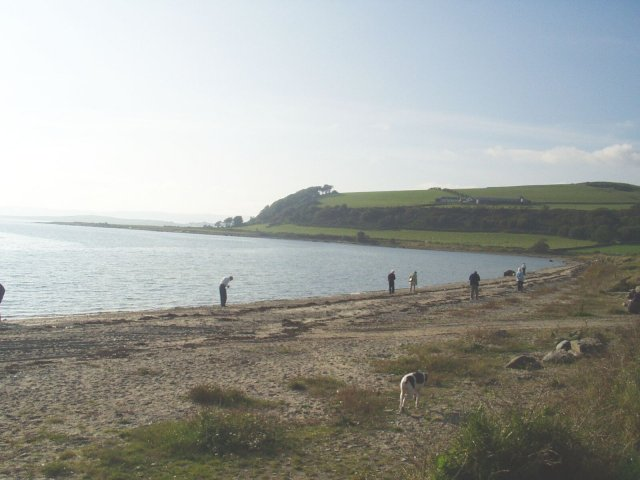
- Ettrick Bay from the south, looking north as the bay curves to Kildavanan Point

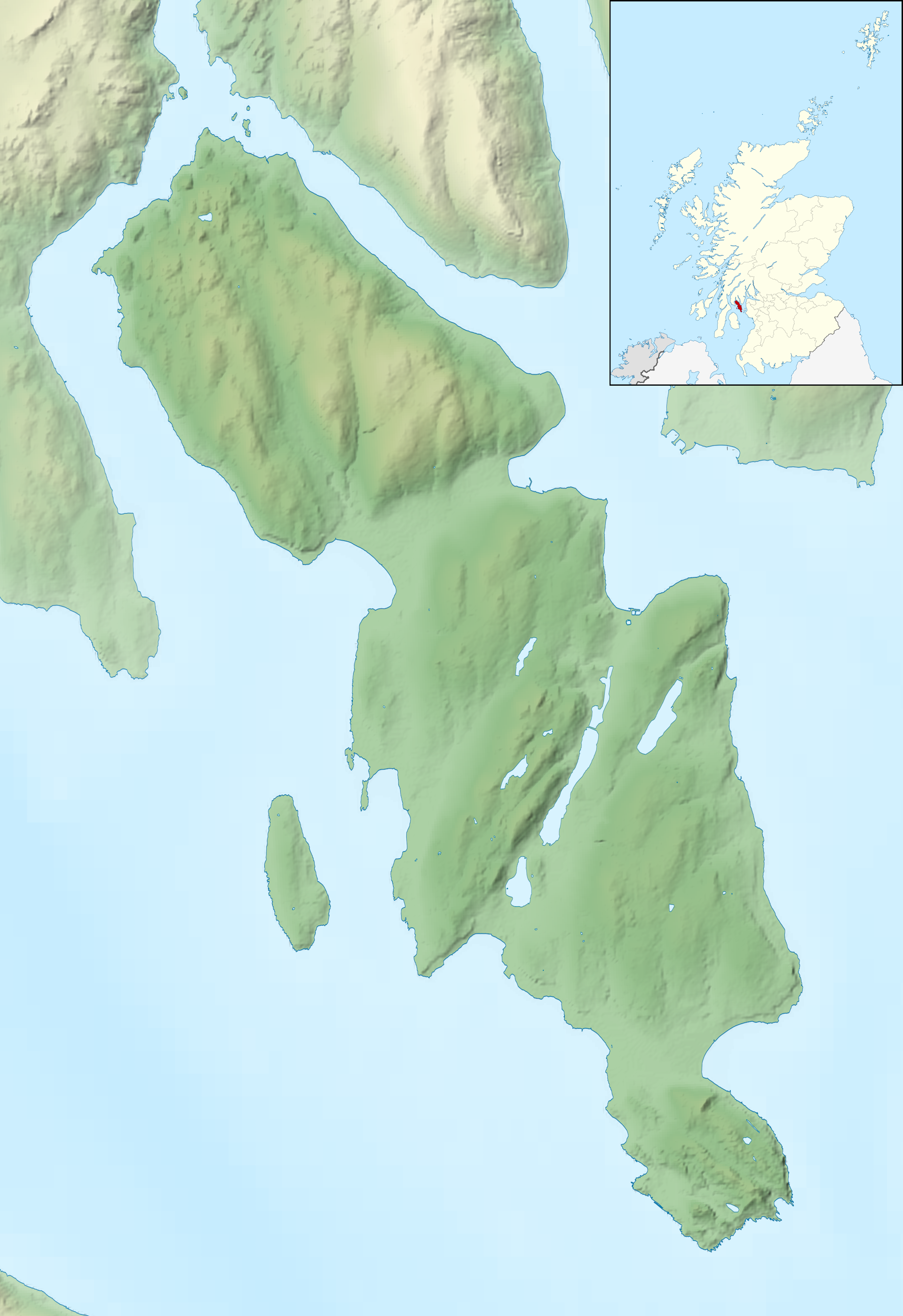
- Location within Bute Location within Argyll and Bute
- Location: Isle of Bute, Argyll and Bute Scotland
- Coordinates: 55°50′39.592″N 5°8′33″W
- River sources: Glenmore Burn; Ettrick Burn; Drumachloy Burn; St Colmac Burn
- Ocean/sea sources: Atlantic Ocean
- Catchment area: 22.5 kilometres (14.0 mi)^{2}
- Basin countries: Scotland
- Max. length: 1.7 km (1.1 mi)
- Max. width: 0.960 km (0.597 mi)
- Average depth: 20 metres (66 ft)

Ettrick Bay is a wide, tidal, sandy coastal embayment with a chord of 1 mile (2 km), on a 218° bearing, located on the west coast of the Isle of Bute in the Firth of Clyde, within council area of Argyll and Bute in Scotland. The bay was used for practice training for the D-Day landings.

== Geography ==
The bay faces the Kyles of Bute, a narrow sea channel that separates the northern end of the Isle of Bute from the Cowal peninsula, and offers views of Isle of Arran. The bay is bounded by a coarse sandy beach which is popular with tourists and local people. During low tide, the water's edge can be up to 500 metres (1,600 ft) from the high tide mark. A number of rivers flow into the bay, including the Glenmore Burn, Ettrick Burn, Drumachloy Burn and St Colmac Burn.

At the north end of the bay, which mainly consists of rocky outcrops, lies the Kildavanan Point, with the feature known as Macallister's Gun, located close to the point. At the south end of the bay is the rocky outcrop called Island McNeil, which forms the outer boundary of the bay.

The surrounding area is mostly rural with agriculture being the main land use. Average rainfall for the region is 392mm, compared to 331mm in Scotland as a whole. Windy Hill is the highest peak on the Isle of Bute. Located directly to the north of the bay, it is 278 metres (912 ft). Other small hills surrounding the bay include:

- Eanan Hill to the north east – 166 metres (545 ft)
- Glenabea Hill, behind Eanan Hill – 201 metres (659 ft)
- Kilbride Hill, which bounds Windy Hill at the east side – 256 metres (840 ft)
- Muirton Hill, which is to the south of Windy Hill – also 256 metres (840 ft)

To the east and south of the bay, all the hills are shallow.

3.25 miles (5 km) miles directly south of Ettrick Bay lies the sheltered bay of St Ninian's Bay, which is named after the 8th-century Christian saint Saint Ninian. The island of Inchmarnock can be seen from Ettrick Bay and lies on a south by south west bearing of around 200° at a distance of 3.25 miles (5 km) from the bay, and is located at the northern end of the Sound of Bute in the Firth of Clyde on the same longitude as St Ninian's Bay.

== Settlements ==
The nearest town to the bay is Rothesay, which is 2.5 miles (4 km) to the east. The small coastal village of Port Bannatyne is located 2 miles (3 km) to the north east, on Ardbeg point of Kames Bay. Kames Castle and, 500 metres (1,600 ft) to the north, Wester Kames Castle stands near to Kames Bay.

== Features ==
A Bronze Age stone circle is situated at St Colmac Farm, which is located south of the B875 road to Ettrick Bay from Port Bannatyne, about 0.6 miles (1 km) northeast of the shore of Ettrick Bay. A Celtic cross that is often associated with the stone circle is located at the ruined 19th-century and Category C listed St Colmac's Church, about 100 metres (330 ft) from the stone circle in a north west direction. A well-known tourist attraction, and often associated together, they were built several thousand years apart. The church's manse, today known as Cnoc an Raer, is contemporary with the former place of worship. At the bridge over Glenmore Burn lie concrete frames built for the British Army for exercises on Inchmarnock. These frames represented practice landing craft for D-Day landings.

== Gallery ==
Abandoned St Colmac Church with ancient Celtic Cross

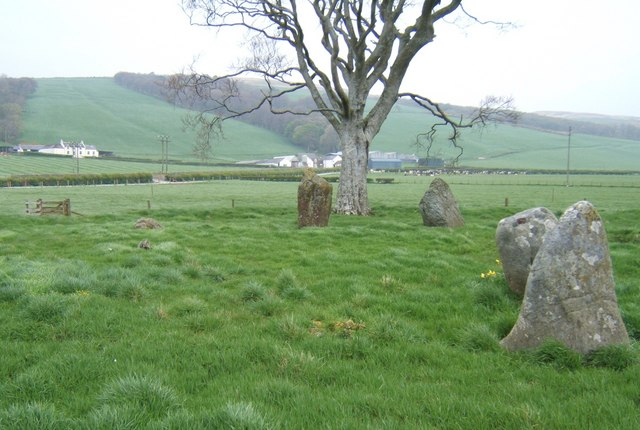
Stone Circle near St Colmac Farm

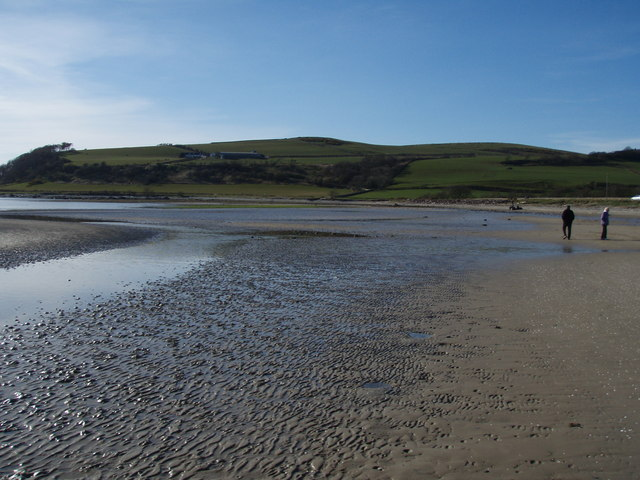
Ettrick Bay

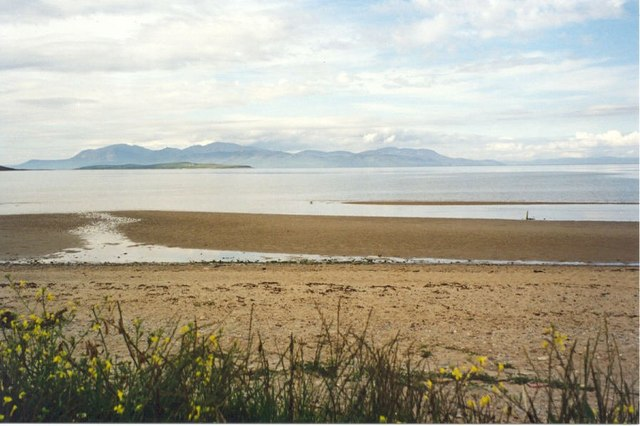
Ettrick Bay looking towards the Isle of Arran

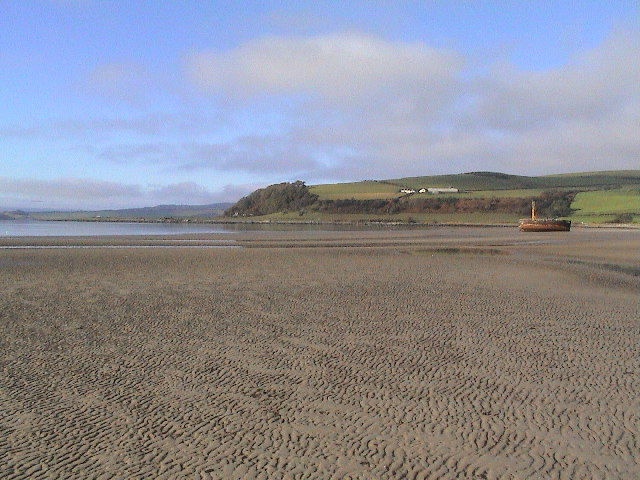
Looking towards the north and the point on the Kildavanan Point

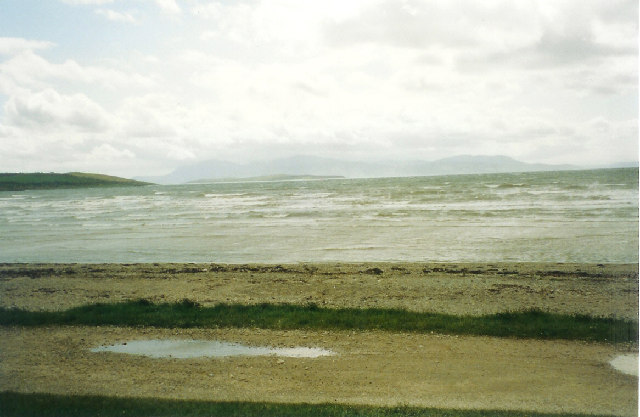
Looking south over a stormy Ettrick Bay. The island of Arran is visible in the distance

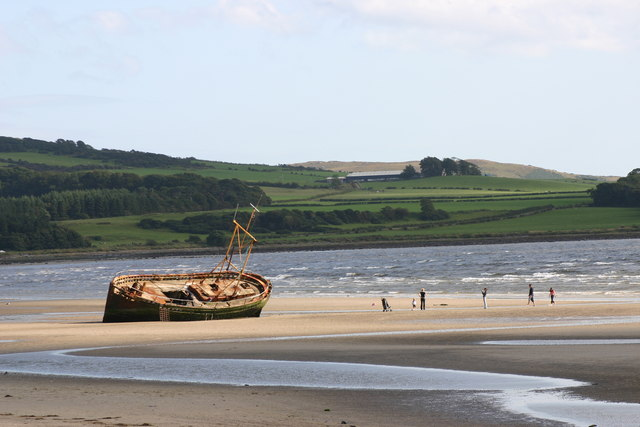
This view of Ettrick Bay beach, taken from the cafe car park, shows an abandoned and wrecked fishing boat

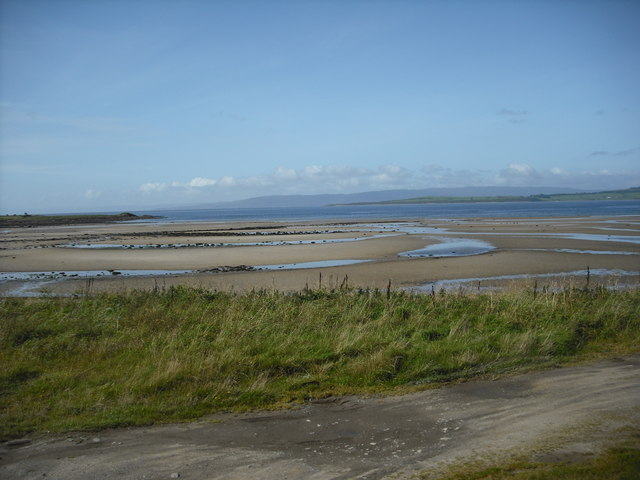
The beach from the car park looking south

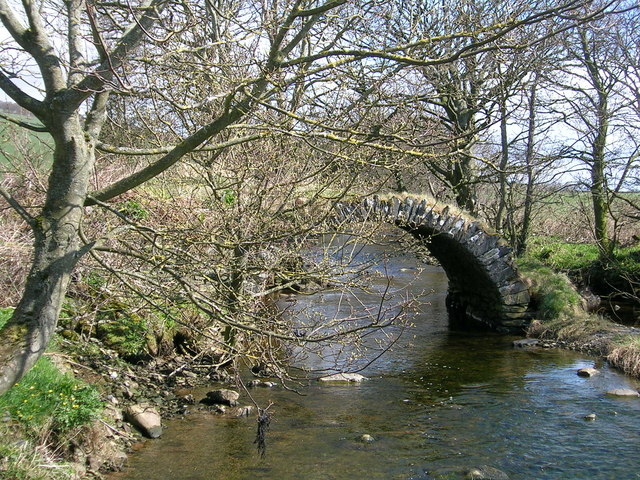
The ancient and ruined Drumachloy Bridge over the Drumachloy Burn

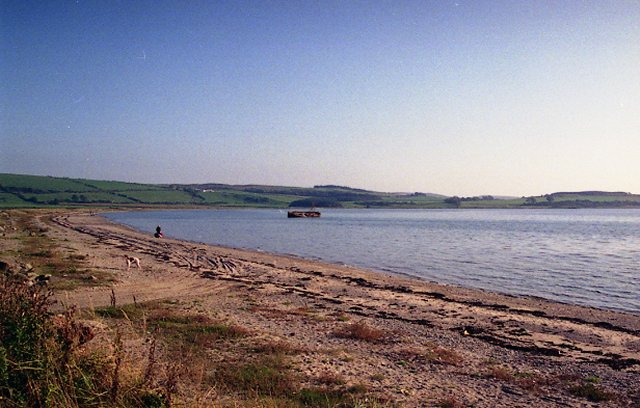
Ettrick Bay looking south

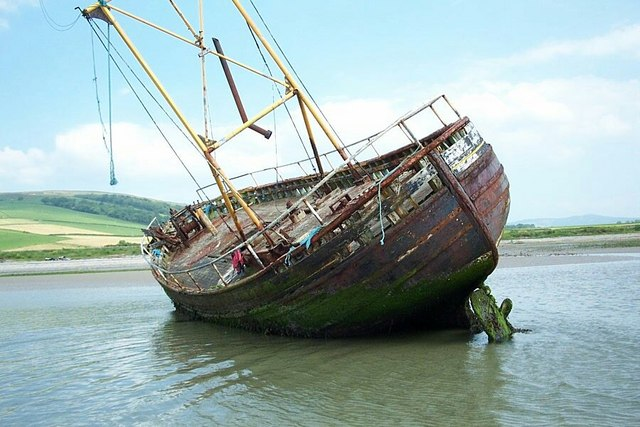
Fishing boat that was wrecked in 1994 and removed in 2007 when it became dangerous after a winter storm. The crew mistook low-lying ground for a channel to the north of the island and foundered
