= Wester Kames Castle =

Castle in the Isle of Bute, Scotland

Coordinates: 55.8667°N 5.0993°W

Wester Kames Castle is located near Kames Bay near Port Bannatyne, Isle of Bute, Scotland. Dating from around 1700, the castle was rebuilt around 1900 from a ruined state.

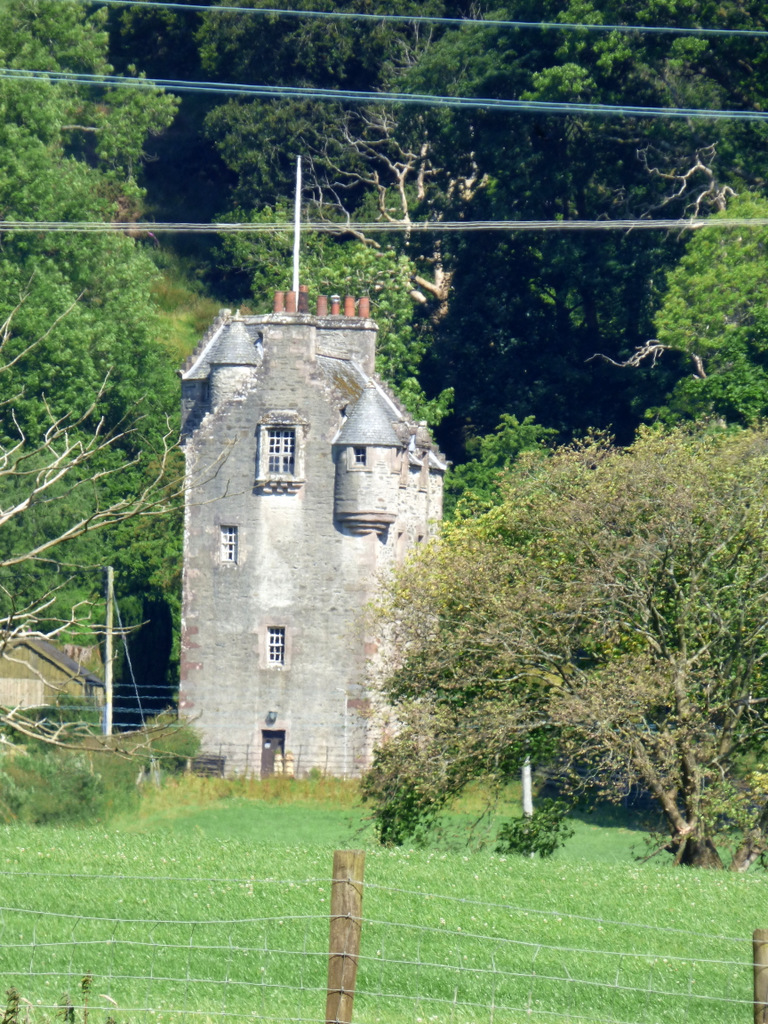
Wester Kames Castle, 2018

== History ==
The tower house of Wester Kames dates from around 1700, and was once the seat of the Spense family. By 1895 it formed part of the Marquess of Bute's estate, and only the ground floor was standing. The 3rd Marquess of Bute commissioned the architect Robert Weir Schultz to rebuild the tower in 1897. The junction of the original ruin and the 19th-century rebuilding is marked by a line of brickwork. Schultz' attention to detail delivered in a sympathetic restoration, resulting in a "convincing Baronial tower".

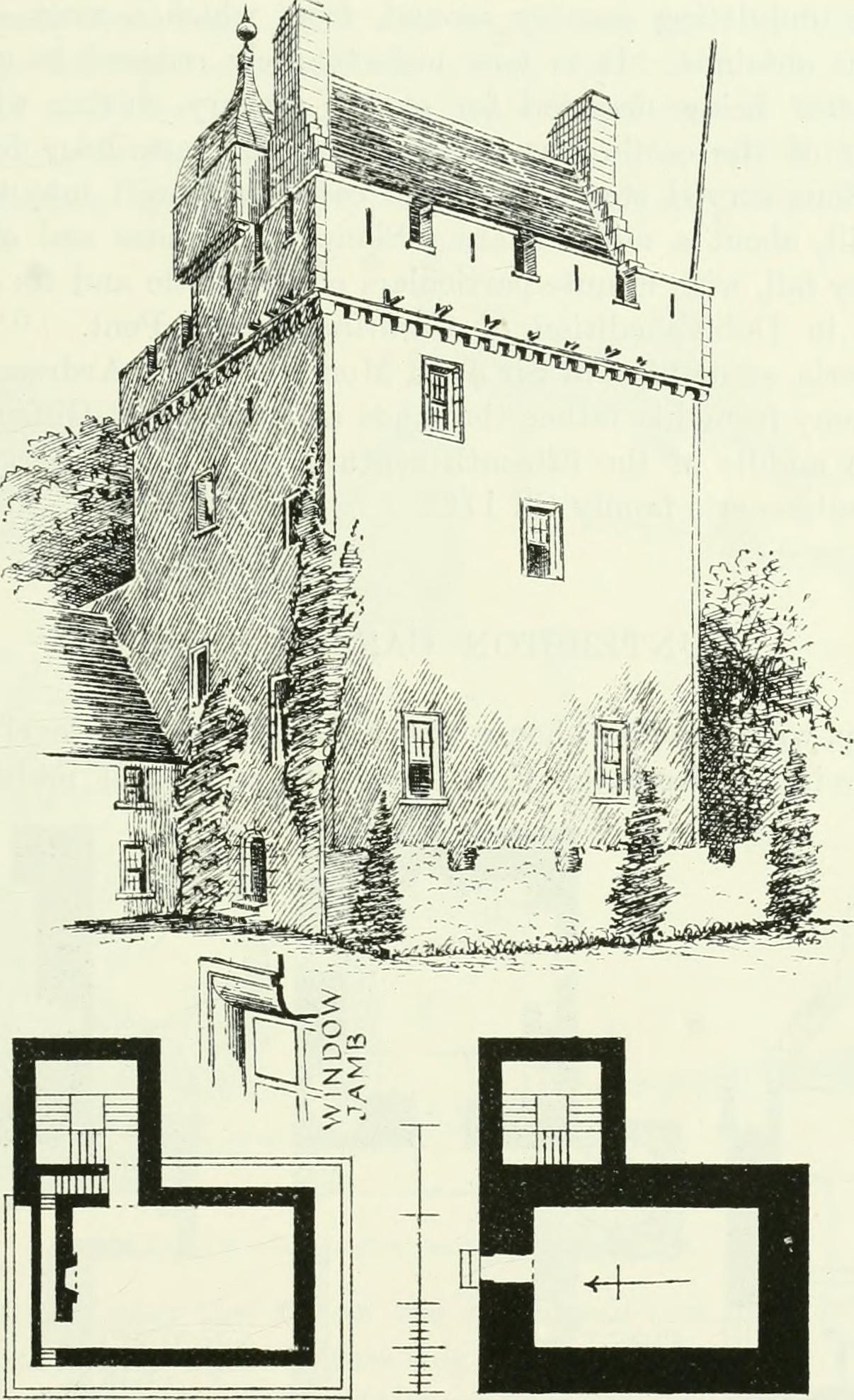
1887 drawing

The tower measures 25 by 21 feet (7.6 by 6.4 m). It stands four storeys high, with a five-storey stair tower at the north-west. Wester Kames is a Category A listed building.

== See also ==
- Kames Castle, which stands around 500 metres (1,600 ft) to the south
