= St Colmac's Church =

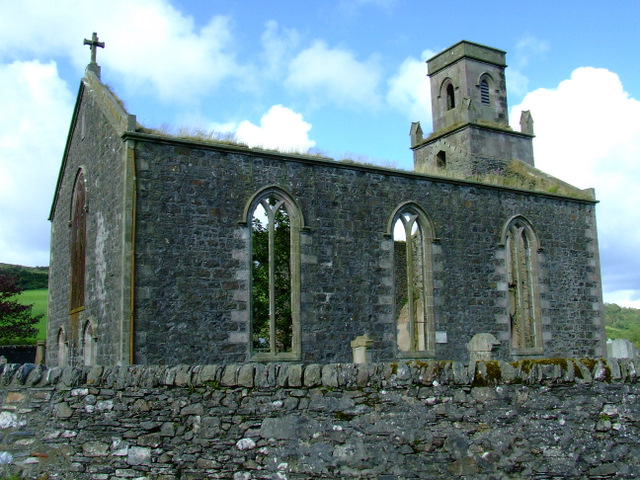
- The ruins in 2011, looking northeast
- St Colmac's Church
- 55°51′35″N 5°06′44″W
- Location: St Colmac, Isle of Bute, Argyll and Bute
- Country: Scotland

History
- Dedication: Saint Colmac

Architecture
- Architect: John Paterson
- Architectural type: Gothic
- Completed: c. 1835; 191 years ago

St Colmac's Church is a ruined 19th-century church in St Colmac, north-east of Ettrick Bay, on the Isle of Bute, Argyll and Bute, Scotland. Built in 1835, it is now a Category B listed structure, as are its kirkyard, boundary wall, gatepiers and gates.

What is now known as Cnoc an Raer, the former manse of the church, is located about 600 feet (180 m) to the west, built around the same time. Both properties are believed to have been built by John Paterson, a "very able builder and skilled mason" of Largs. They stand on the northern side of the B875 road, the church in a triangular plot of land with a minor road bounding it on its northern side.

Now gutted, the church's interior had an "unusual" arrangement, per photographs in the possession of the National Monuments Record of Scotland, with a full-length common communion table running east-to-west down the centre of the church, flanked by timber pews. West-facing box pews lined the side aisles. According to the handbook of the Scottish Vernacular Buildings Working Group, the communion table was made when required by converting pew ends.

== Kirkyard ==
A Celtic cross that is often associated with a nearby Bronze Age stone circle is located in front of the church tower. A well-known tourist attraction, and often associated together, they were built several thousand years apart.

A modern, adjacent cemetery (North Bute Parish Churchyard) is located to the east of the 19th-century kirkyard.

== Ruinous detail ==
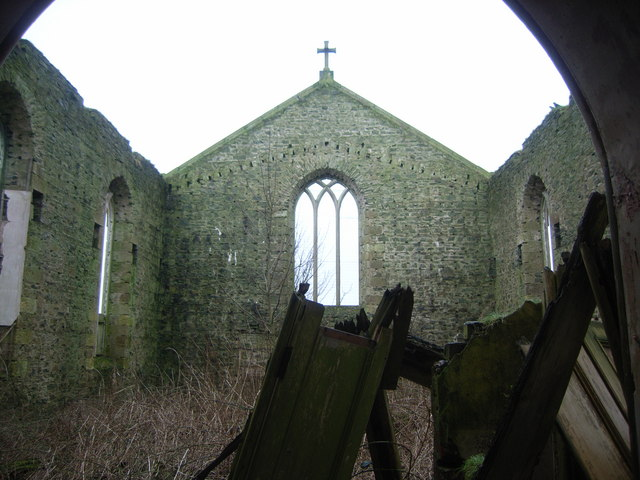
The interior western wall, 2008

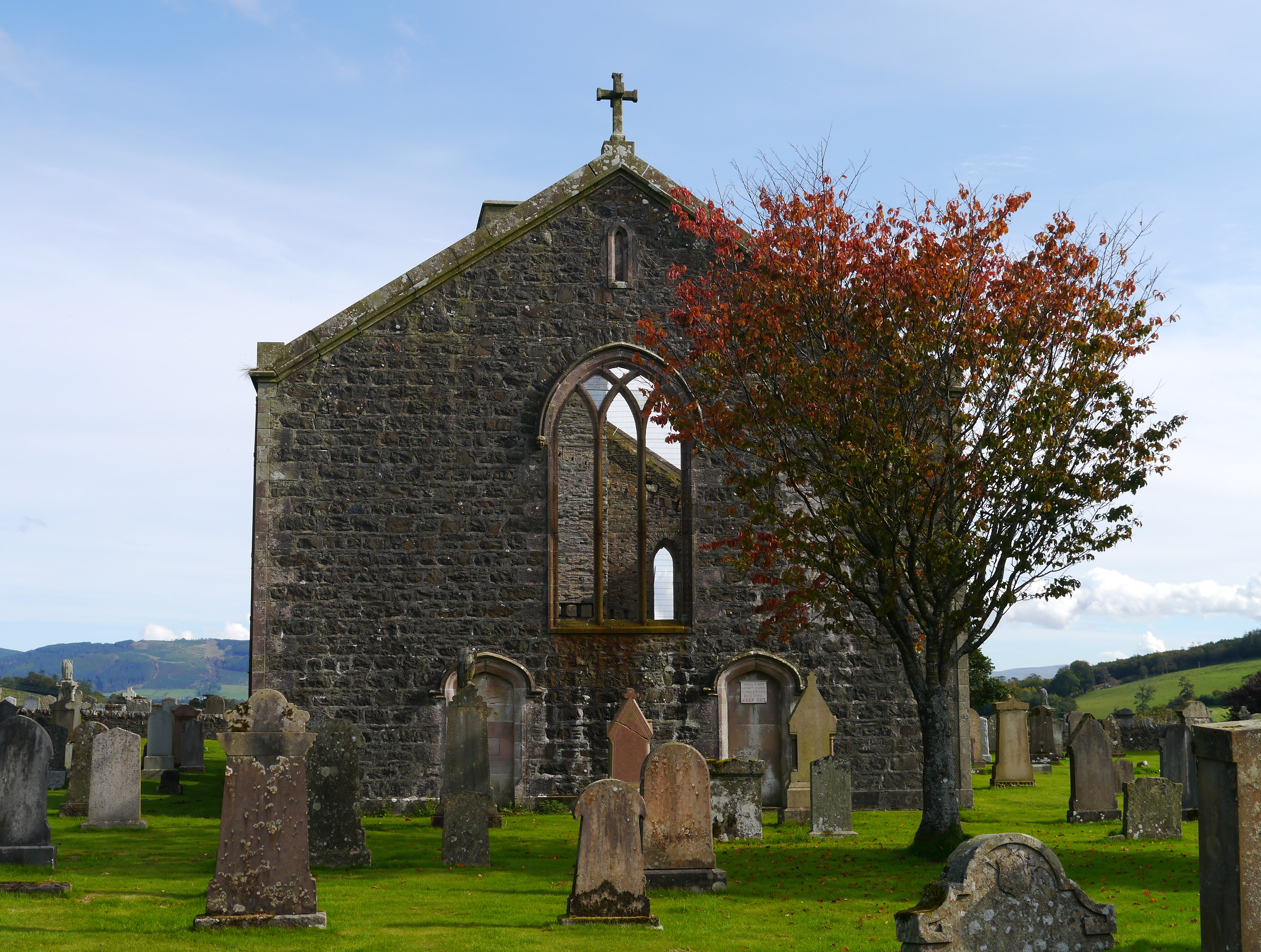
The western elevation of the church

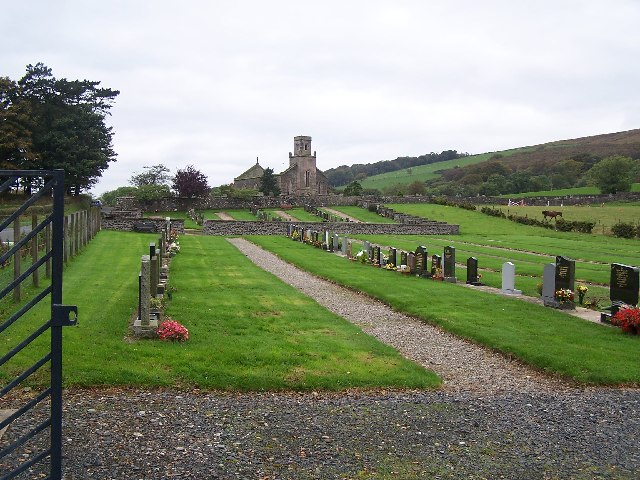
The modern cemetery (not part of the listed status), looking west back to the church
