= Port Bannatyne =

Coordinates: 55.86°N 5.08°W

Port Bannatyne: Scottish Gaelic: Port MhicEamailinn
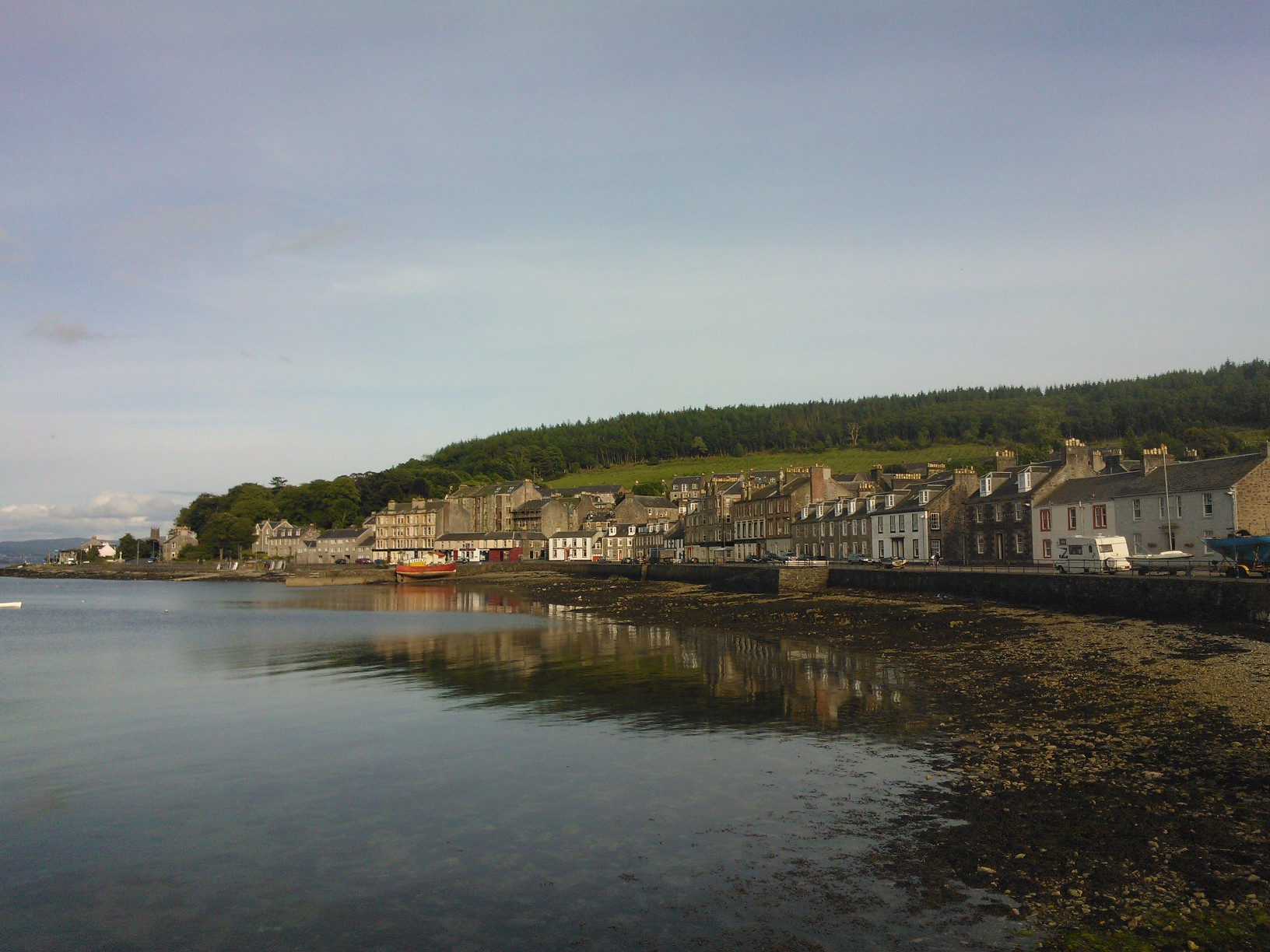
- Port Bannatyne village

- Location within Argyll and Bute
- Population: 1,090 (2020)
- OS grid reference: NS072672
  - London: 455 miles
- Council area: Argyll and Bute
- Lieutenancy area: Argyll and Bute
- Country: Scotland
- Sovereign state: United Kingdom
- Post town: ISLE OF BUTE
- Postcode district: PA20
- Dialling code: 01700
- Police: Scotland
- Fire: Scottish
- Ambulance: Scottish
- UK Parliament: Argyll, Bute and South Lochaber
- Scottish Parliament: Argyll and Bute

Port Bannatyne (Scottish Gaelic: Port MhicEamailinn), is a coastal village on the Isle of Bute, Firth of Clyde, Scotland that is home to many steamers. Port Bannatyne developed into the 1900s as a quieter alternative to Rothesay. It is a popular harbour, with a small yacht marina and boatyard and an unusual 13-hole golf course rather than the standard 18.

== Geography ==
Port Bannatyne lies on the Firth of Clyde, approximately 2 miles (3 km) north of Rothesay on the Scottish Isle of Bute. Rhubodach is a further 6 miles (10 km) north away on the A886 and a Caledonian MacBrayne ferry service to the Cowal peninsula. This ferry runs every 30 minutes during the day. In Rothesay there is a Caledonian MacBrayne ferry service to Wemyss Bay in Inverclyde. This ferry leaves every hour (journey time 35 minutes) during the day.

Substantial slate and stone houses face the sea around Kames Bay. The village's focus was the stone pier mid-way along the south shore of Kames Bay. The bay provided mooring for yachts and fishing boats.

On the seafront are a shop/Post Office and the community-owned Anchor Tavern which was rescued from closure by local people who formed the Port Bannatyne Development Trust in 2020. The Port Royal Hotel was bought in 2000 by a Russo-Norwegian family who renovated the building and converted it into a replica of a Russian Tavern of Imperial Times, however it closed in 2017.

Above the village, with views across the sea to the Isle of Arran and the Argyll hills, is the Port Bannatyne golf-course. Built in 1912, the course now has 13 holes. The village has strong links overseas and has its own club for the French game of Pétanque, with a pitch, or piste, on the seafront.

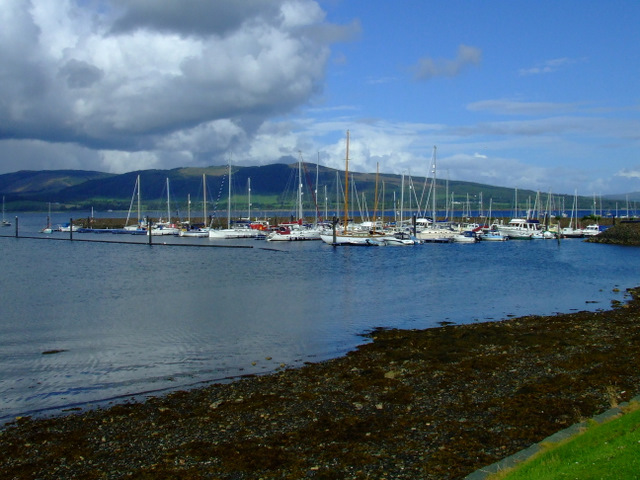
Port Bannatyne Marina

In 2005, work was started on a new yacht marina at the west end of the village, beside an existing boatyard business. The small boatyard has grown into a stone-built breakwater which encloses part of Kames Bay and provides 108 berths for craft up to 16.5 m in length.

== History ==
The village started in 1801 with the building of a small harbour on Kames Bay. Lord Bannatyne of Kames Castle, at the head of the bay, planned the village in an attempt to rival Rothesay. Initially known as Kamesburgh, by the mid-19th century, steamers were calling there regularly. In 1860 the Marquess of Bute purchased this part of the island and renamed the village Port Bannatyne in honour of the long historical association of the Bannatyne family with the area. Boat building became an important local industry.

In 1879 a narrow gauge horse-drawn tram linked Port Bannatyne with Rothesay. This was electrified and extended across the island to Ettrick Bay in 1902.

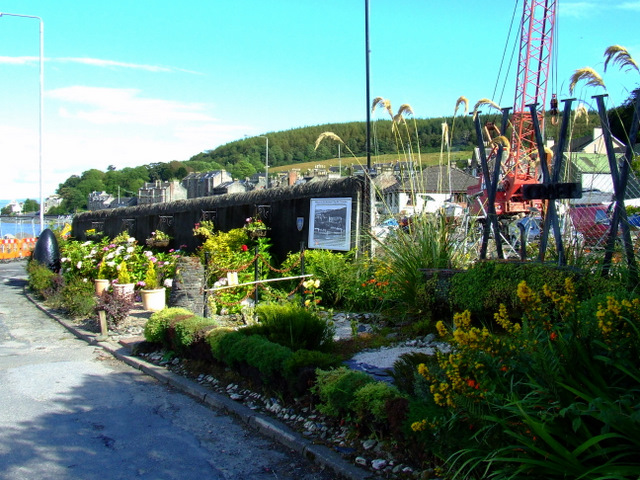
HMS Varbel Memorial Garden

In the Second World War midget submarines exercised in the bay and nearby Loch Striven. The luxury Kyles Hydro Hotel, overlooking the Port, was requisitioned by the Admiralty to serve as the HQ for midget submarine (x-craft) operations. In particular, it was from here (hotel renamed HMS Varbel) that the top secret and audacious attack on the Tirpitz was masterminded.

== Gallery ==
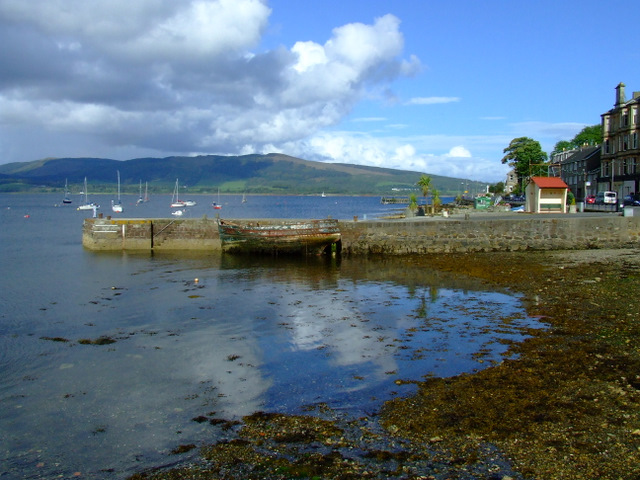
The quay

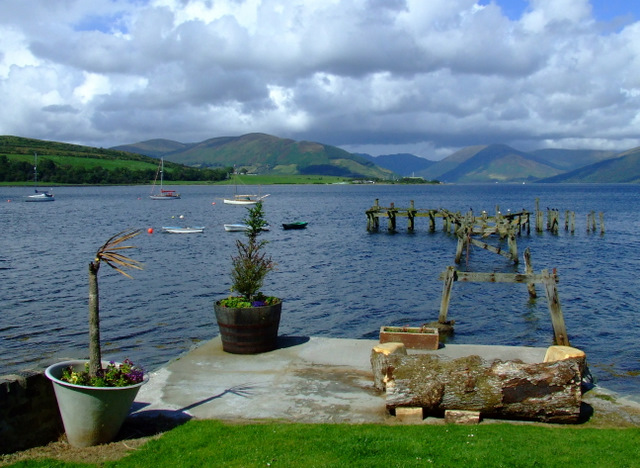
The old pier

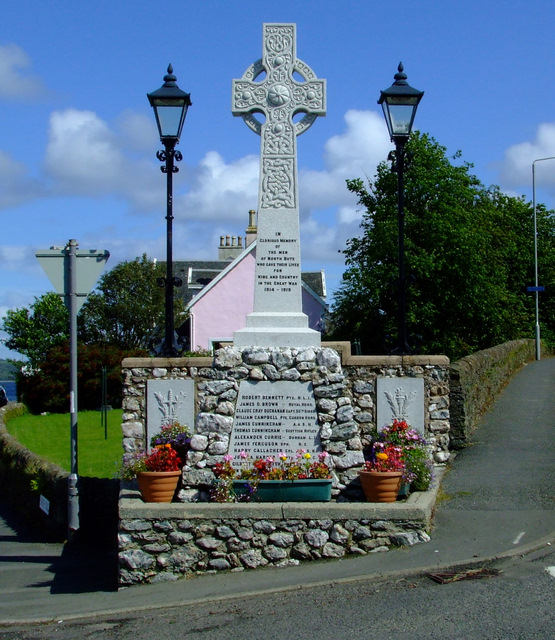
War Memorial

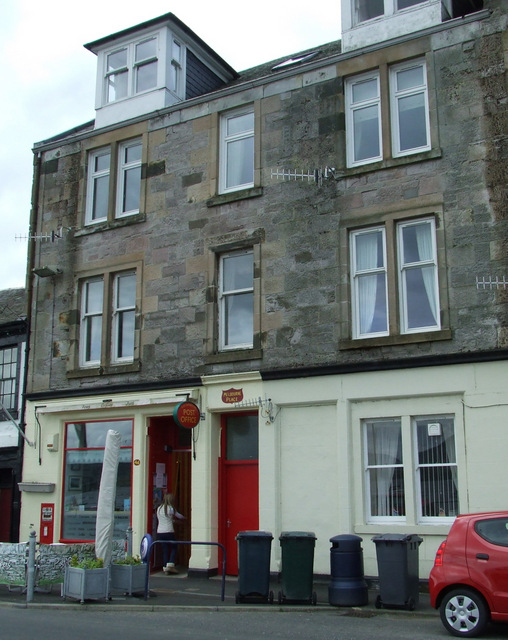
Post Office

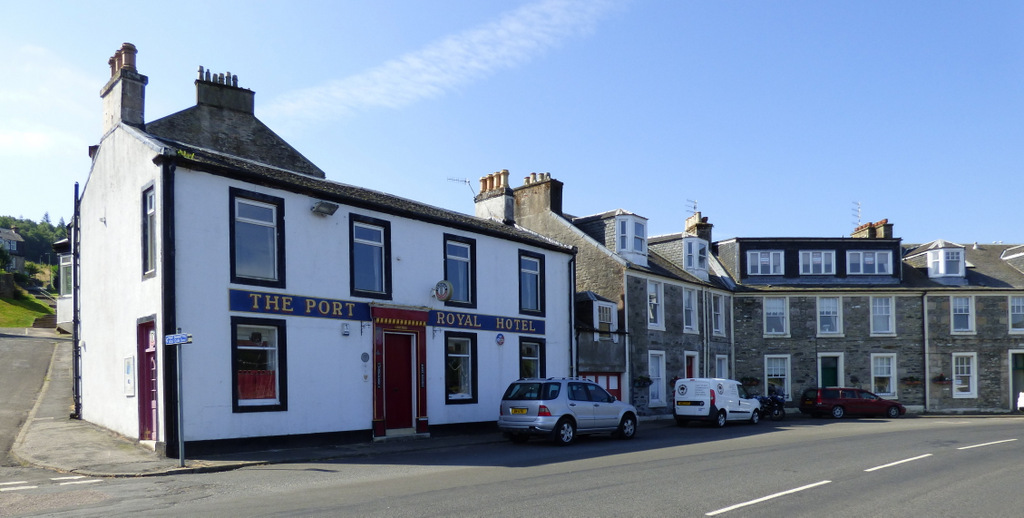
Port Royal Hotel

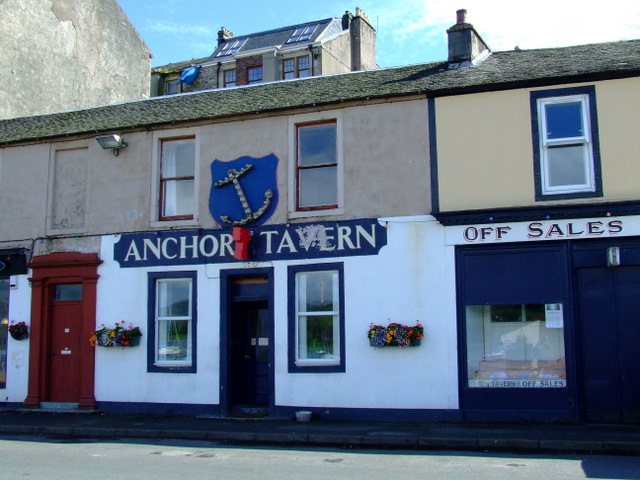
Anchor Tavern (2011)

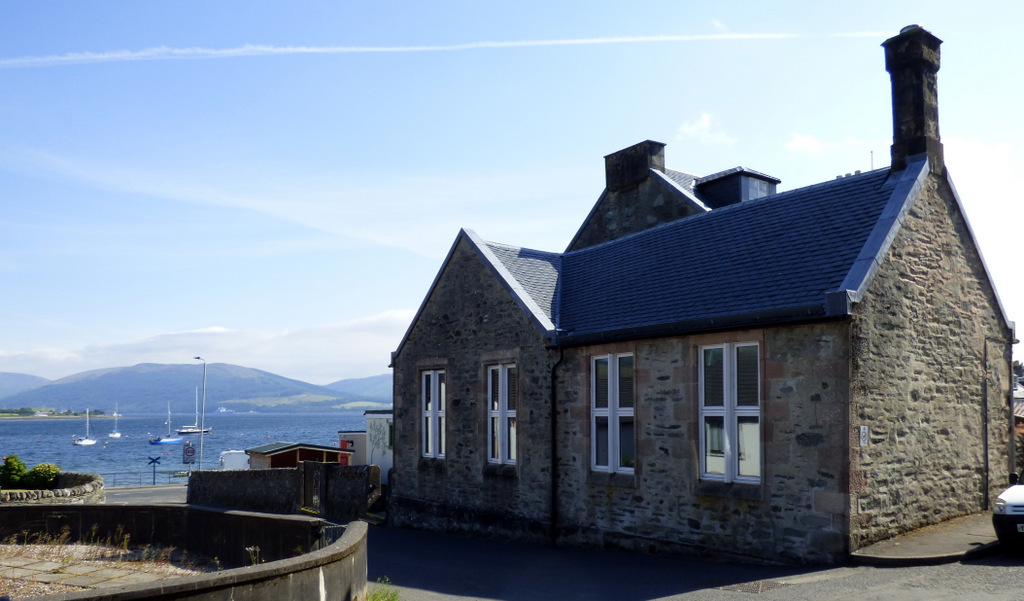
North Bute Primary School

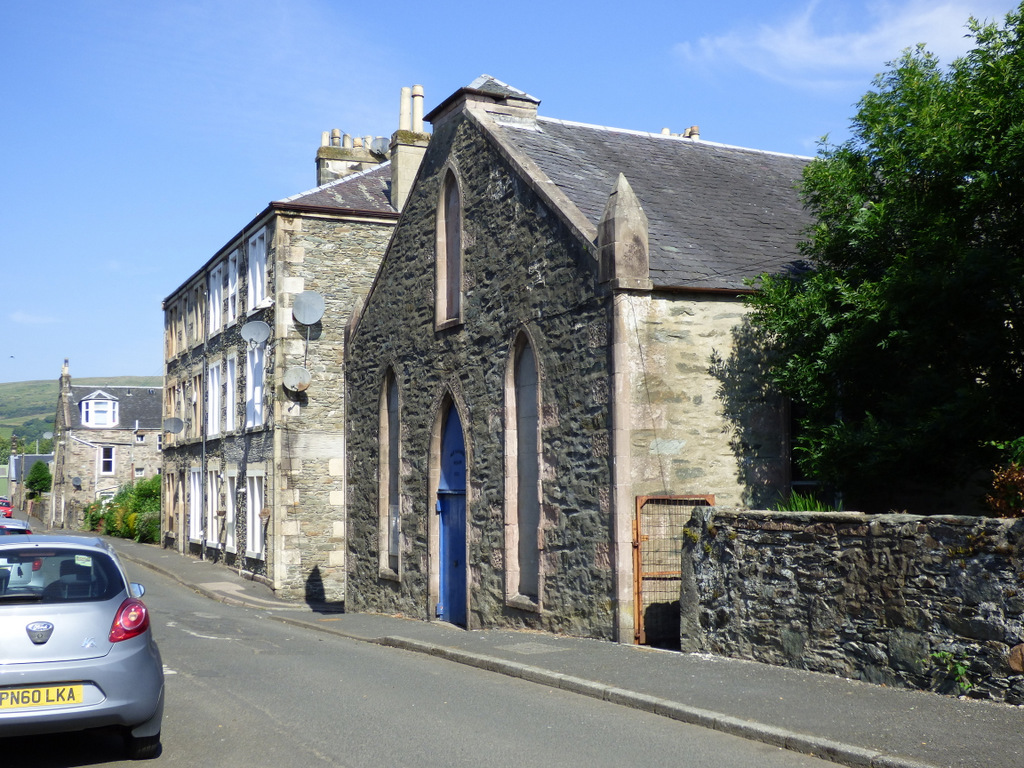
Village Hall

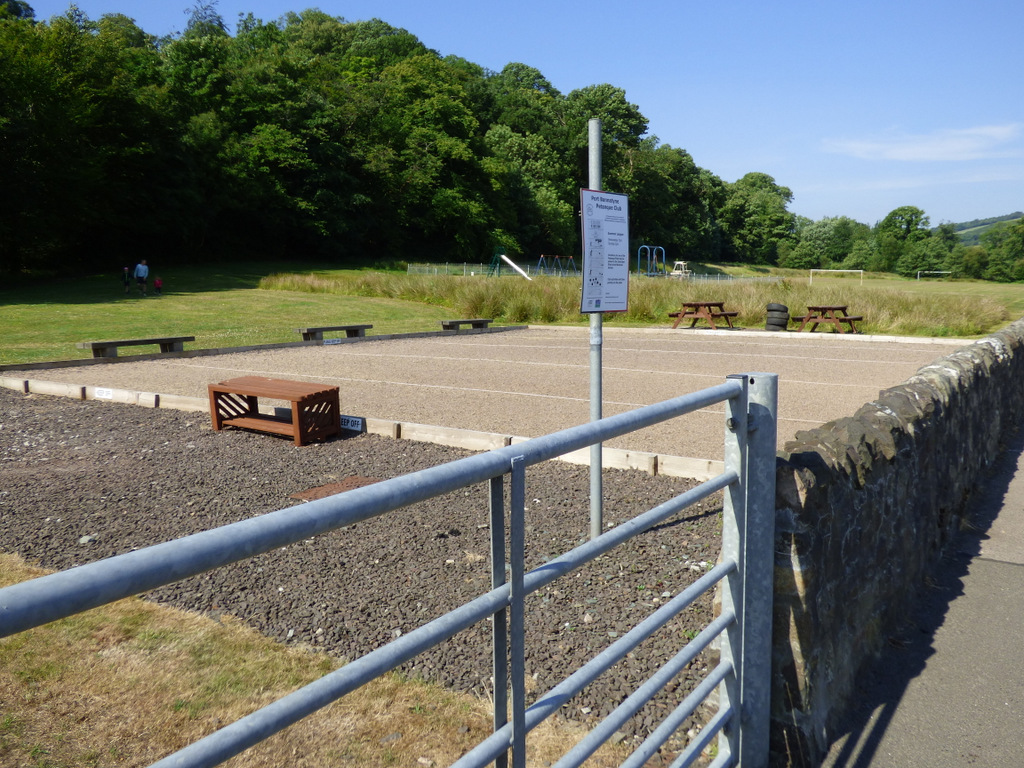
Petanque Club

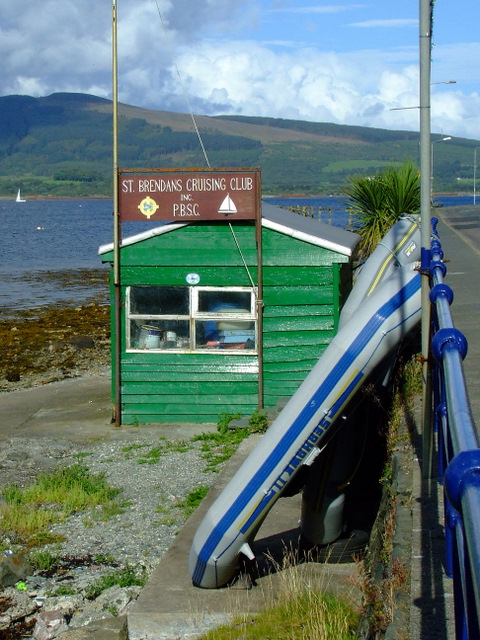
Sailing Club
