= St Colmac Manse =

Former clergy house in Argyll and Bute, Scotland

- Cnoc an Raer
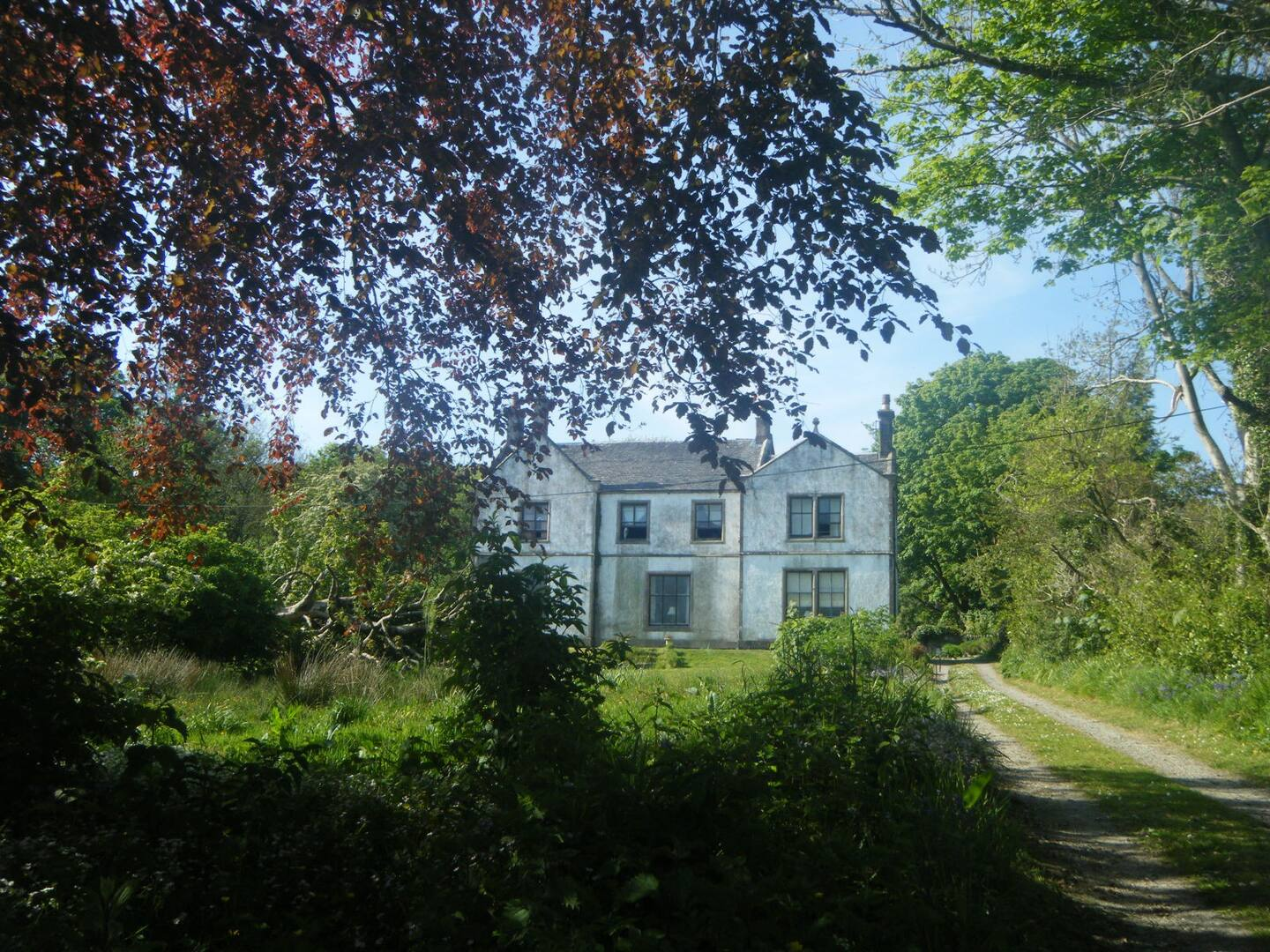
- The manse in 2019
- Interactive map of the St Colmac Manse area

General information
- Location: St Colmac, Isle of Bute, Scotland
- Coordinates: 55.86010°N 5.11521°W
- Completed: c. 1835 (191 years ago)

Technical details
- Floor count: 2 (in original building; 1 in addition)
- Floor area: Approx. 2,689 square feet (249.8 m^{2})

Design and construction
- Main contractor: John Paterson

Other information
- Number of rooms: 11

St Colmac Manse (also known as Cnoc an Raer) is a historic building in St Colmac on the Isle of Bute, Scotland. Dating to around 1835, it was the clergy house for the now-ruined and Category C listed St Colmac's Church, located about 600 feet (180 m) to the east, built around the same time. Both properties are believed to have been built by John Paterson, a "very able builder and skilled mason" of Largs.

The manse sits back about 250 feet (76 m) from the northern side of the B875 road, and several feet above it, at the end of a long driveway. It is two storeys, with a rear extension added in the 20th century. Also at the rear there are two stone outbuildings under slate roofs. The property sits on 1.79 acres (0.72 ha).

== Interior ==
The interior includes a solid-fuel Rayburn range in the kitchen and a cantilever staircase leading up to the first floor. The ground floor has an entrance vestibule, a living room, dining room, music room, kitchen, laundry room and pantry, while on the first floor there is a bathroom (with original Victorian clawfoot bath), the master bedroom with dressing room/bedroom, plus three further bedrooms.

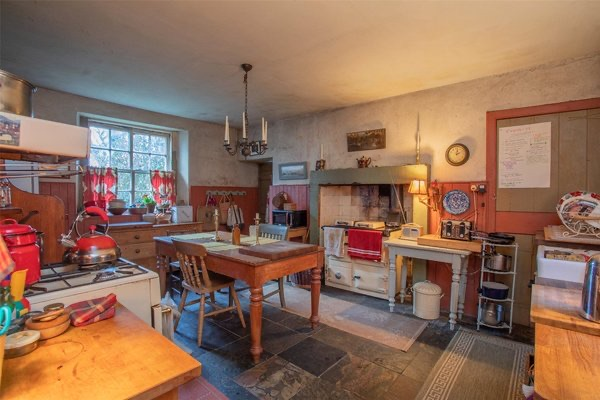
Kitchen, looking southeast to the driveway side of the manse

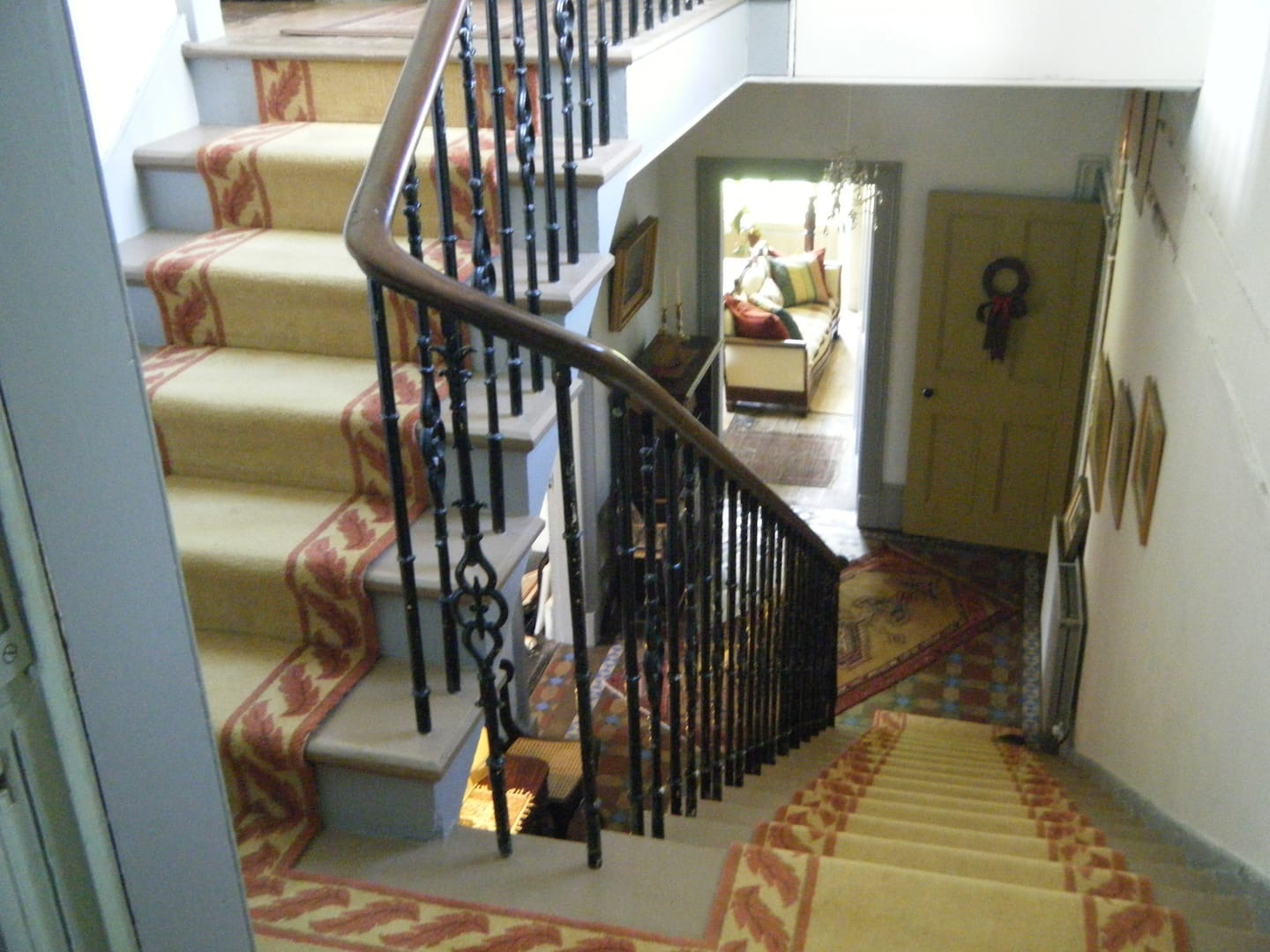
Cantilever staircase, looking towards the western side of the house from the bathroom

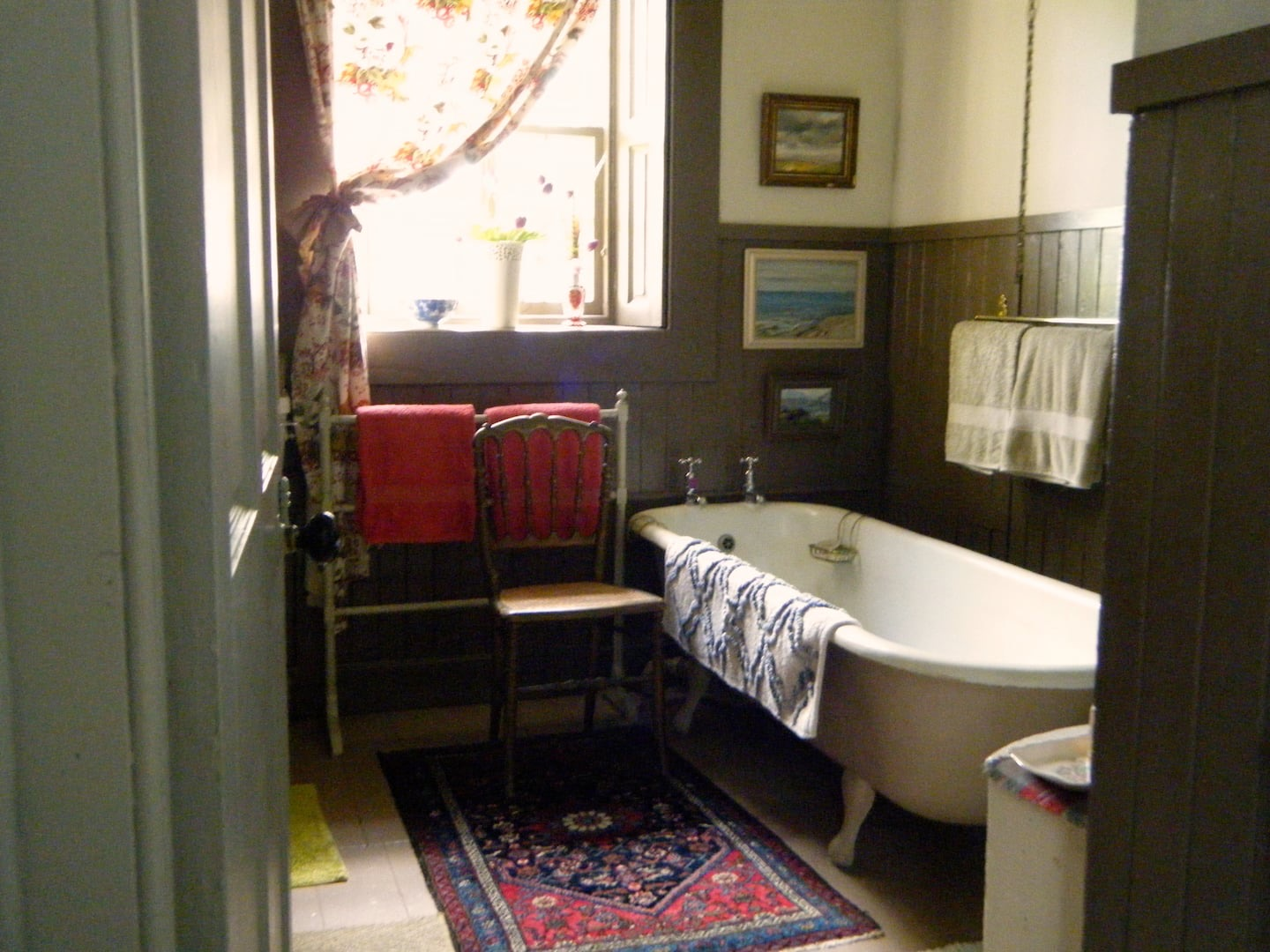
Bathroom and clawfoot bath. The window overlooks the driveway

== Exterior ==
In the back garden there are bedded stone footings of a rectangular building and yard wall. These are the remains of the former Edinmore farm, in records from 1576. The farm belonged to the Estate of Wester Kames. Occupation of the farm ended shortly before the manse's construction.

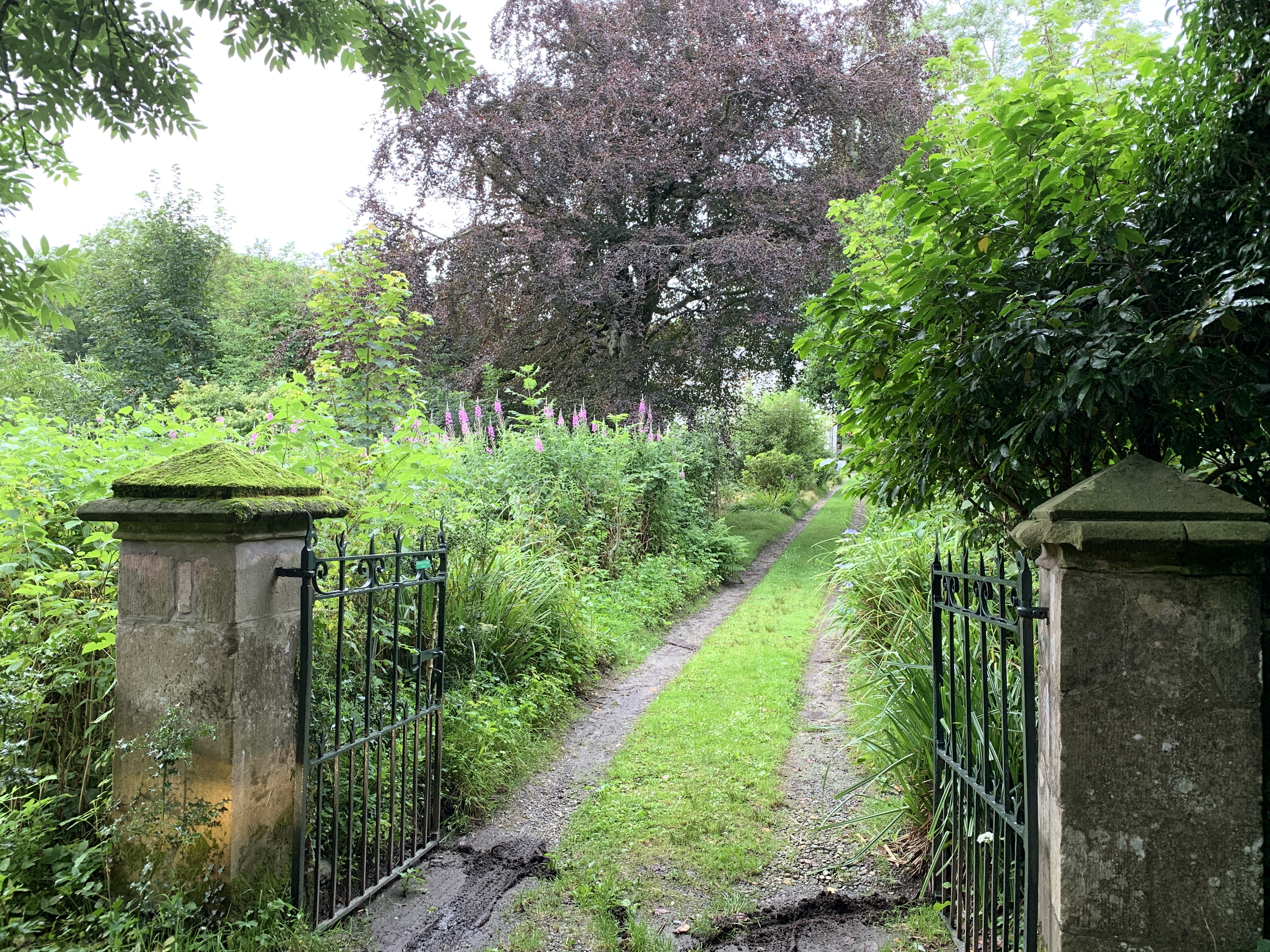
The gateposts and driveway up to the manse

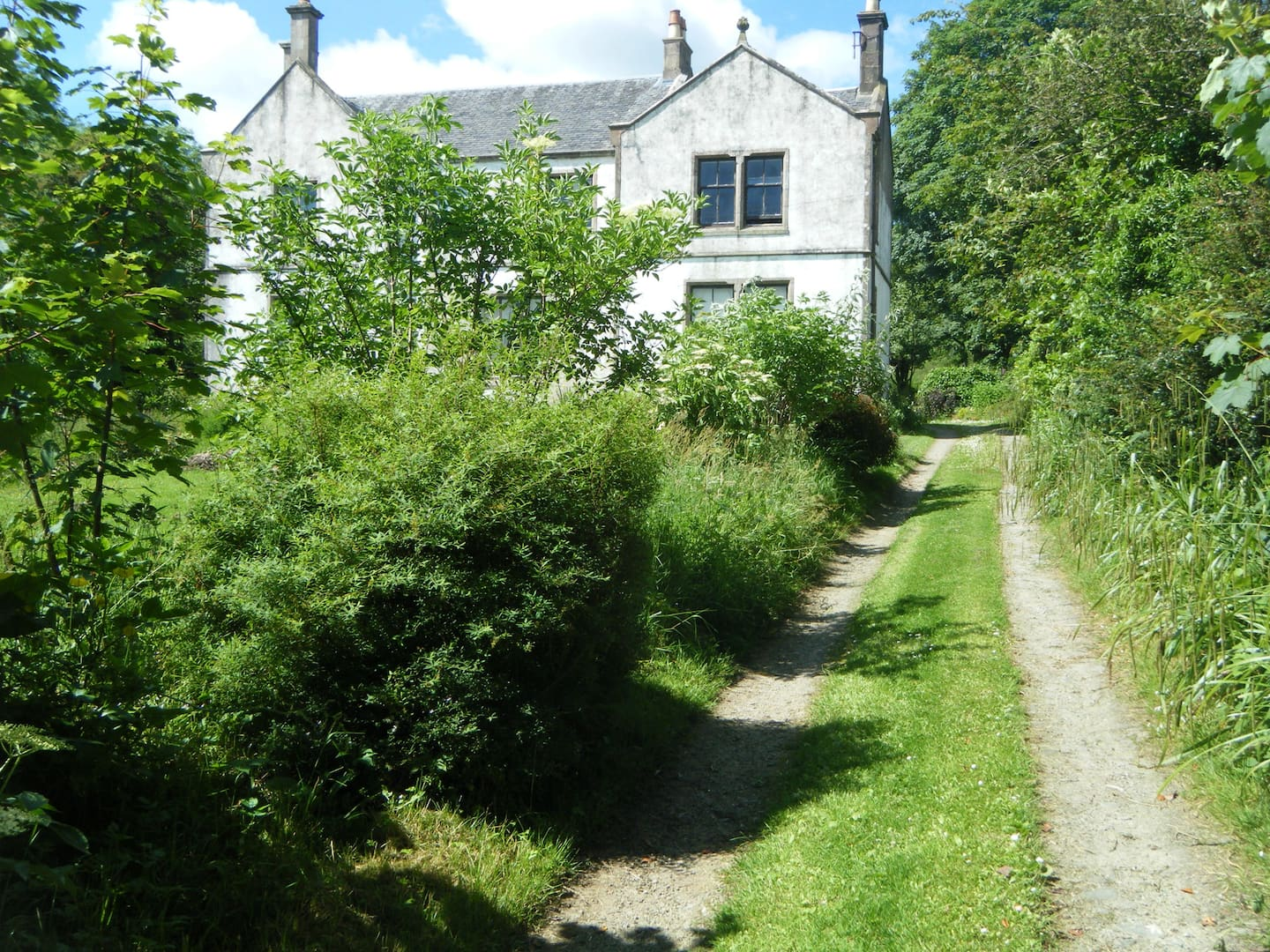
The eastern wing of the manse

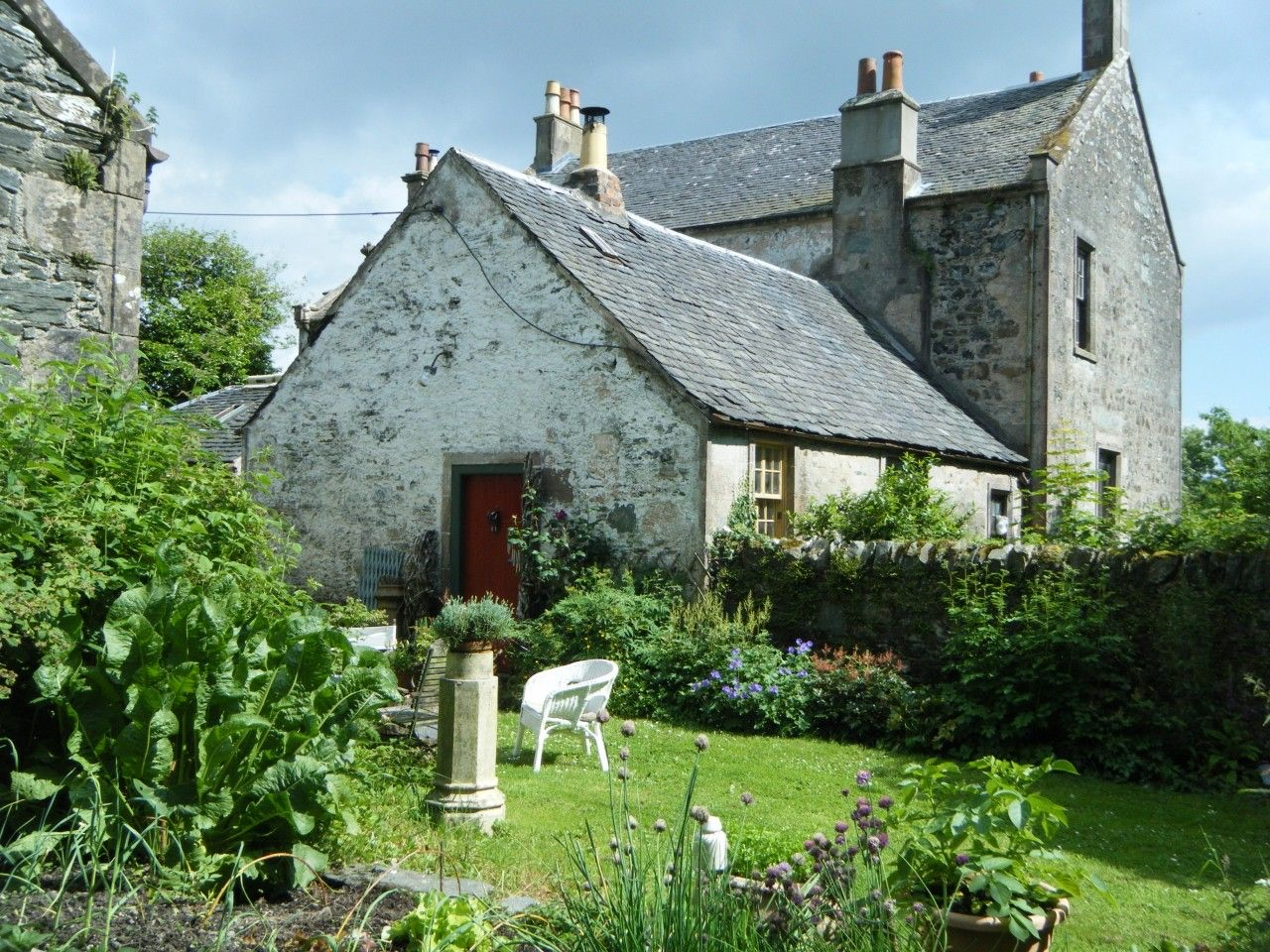
The rear entrance, on the northern side of the house, which enters the kitchen after a small vestibule
