= Kames Castle =

16th-century tower house in Scotland

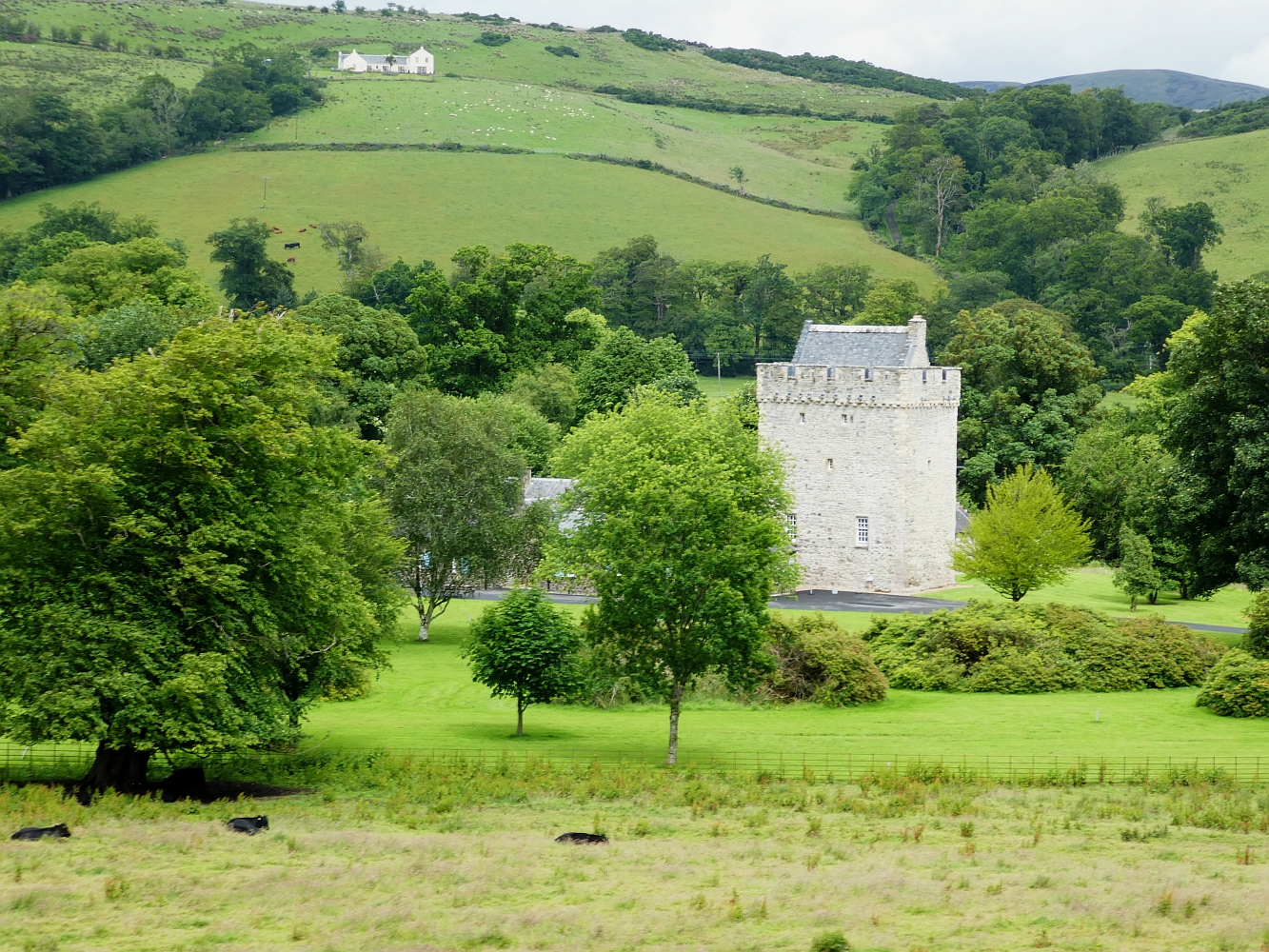
- The castle in 2022
- Interactive map of Kames Castle
- 56.3794°N 5.5565°W
- Location: Scotland

History
- Original use: Castle

Kames Castle is a 14th-century tower house located on the shore of Kames Bay near Port Bannatyne, on the Isle of Bute, Scotland. The castle, which is set in 20 acres (81,000 m^{2}) of planted grounds, includes a 2-acre (8,100 m^{2}) 18th-century walled garden. It is extended through the addition of a range of stone cottages. The castle, cottages, walled garden and other estate buildings are category B listed buildings.

== History ==
The lands of Kames were granted to the Bannatyne family by Robert the Bruce in the 14th century. Although of 14th-century appearance, the present tower house is thought to date from the 16th century. The last Bannatyne owner was Sir William Macleod Bannatyne (1743–1833), a distinguished lawyer and judge in Edinburgh, who took the title Lord Bannatyne on promotion to the College of Justice in 1799. In the later 18th and early 19th century, he laid out the walled garden and constructed a mansion adjoining the tower house.

Kames was the birthplace and early home of the critic and essayist John Sterling (1806–1844). Thomas Carlyle in his biography of Sterling refers to the castle as "a kind of dilapidated baronial residence to which a small farm was then attached". Lord Bannatyne sold the estate around 1810, to James Hamilton WS (1775–1849), preferring his social life in Edinburgh. Kames Castle became part of the Marquess of Bute's estate in 1863. Some alterations to the tower house were undertaken in the later 19th century. Around 1900, the mansion was demolished and replaced with a series of cottages around a courtyard, with the intention of creating a hunting lodge.

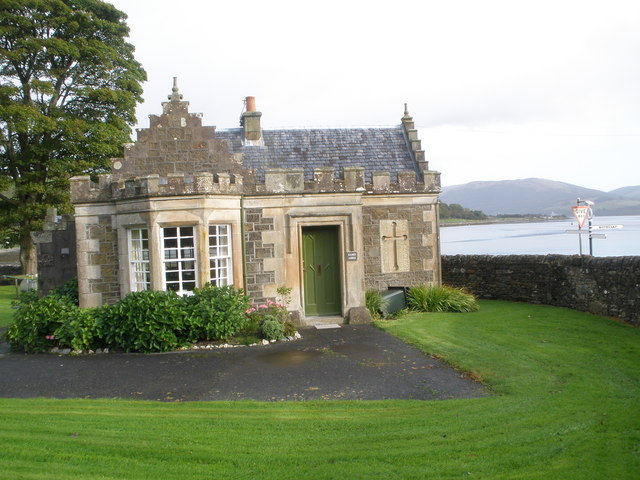
Lodge House

In the mid to late 20th century, Kames was used as a children's holiday home, run by the Scottish Council for Spastics. It is now privately owned, with a number of cottages available as holiday lets.

== See also ==
- Wester Kames Castle, a restored 16th-century tower which lies around 500 metres (1,600 ft) north of Kames Castle
