= B836 road =

Scenic secondary road in Argyll & Bute, Scotland

B836

Route information
- Length: 11.9 mi (19.2 km)

Major junctions
- East end: junction with A815 near Sandbank
- West end: junction with A886 near Clachan of Glendaruel

Location
- Country: United Kingdom
- Primary destinations: Clachaig, Glen Lean, Loch Tarsan, Ardtaraig, Loch Striven

Road network
- Roads in the United Kingdom; Motorways; A and B road zones

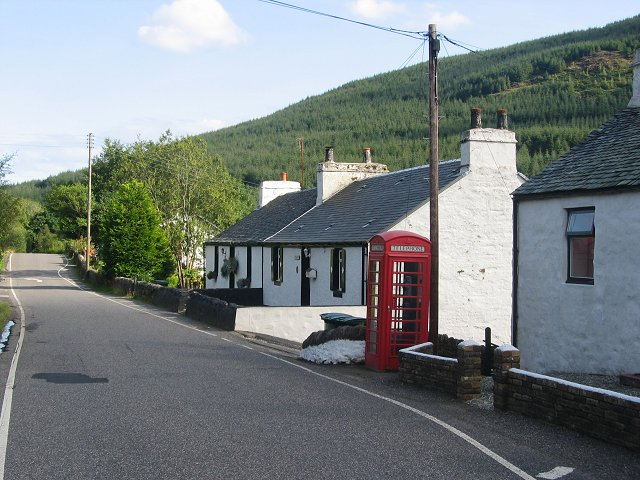
The B836 in Clachaig

The B836 is a scenic secondary road in the Argyll and Bute district of Scotland. It runs east-west across the eastern side of the Cowal peninsula from a point on the A815 near the head of the Holy Loch to a point on the A886 between Clachan of Glendaruel and Colintraive.

For most of its route, the B836 is a single-track road with passing places. It is 19.1 kilometres (11.9 mi) in length, but despite this it has no intermediate junctions with any other through roads. The only connections between it and the wider road network are at its end points.

The B836 provides the shortest route between Dunoon and places in south-west Cowal such as Colintraive and Tighnabruaich. The next shortest alternative, via the A815, Strachur and the A886, adds 30 kilometres (19 mi) to the journey. It also forms part of the National Cycle Route 75, which links Edinburgh with Tarbert on the Kintyre peninsula.

== History ==
As originally designated, the B836 continued north along what is now the A886 through Glendaruel to a junction with the B837 (today's B8000) on the shores of Loch Fyne. Several changes followed, but the northern section of the B836 was part of the A886 by the early 1960s.

== Route ==
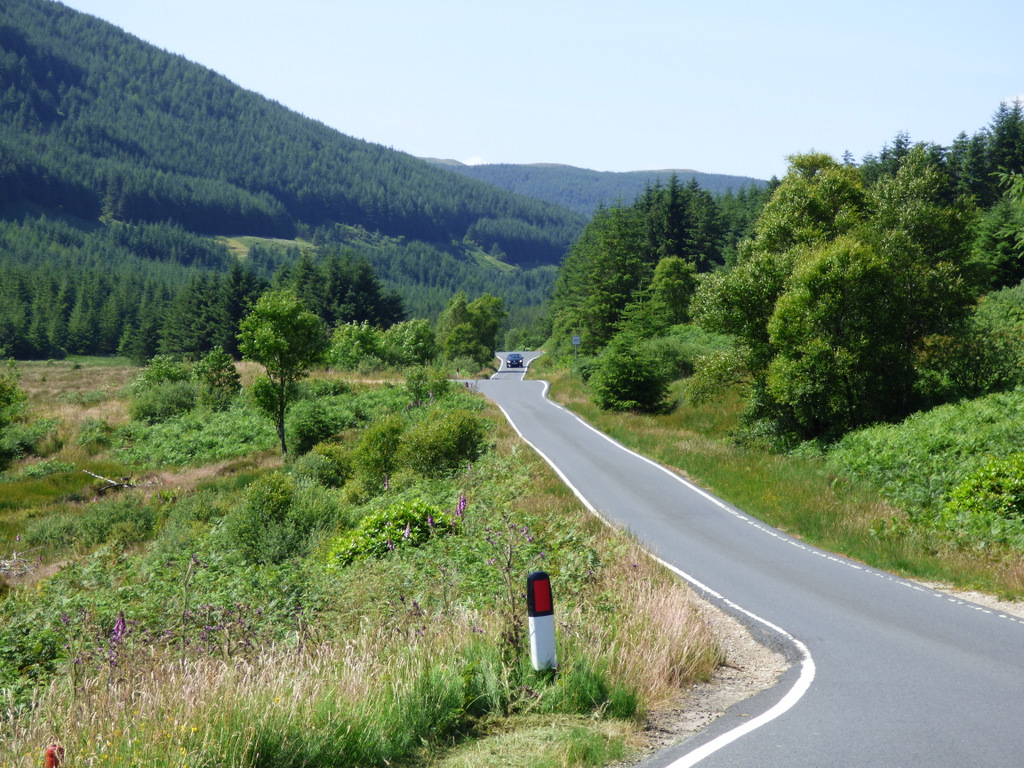
The B836 climbing Glen Lean

The eastern terminus of the B836 is at a junction with the A815 near the head of the Holy Loch, a sea loch off the Firth of Clyde. The junction is some 2 kilometres (1.2 mi) north of Sandbank and 7 kilometres (4.3 mi) north of Dunoon. Car and passenger ferries connect Dunoon with the south side of the Firth of Clyde, and hence to Glasgow by either road or rail.

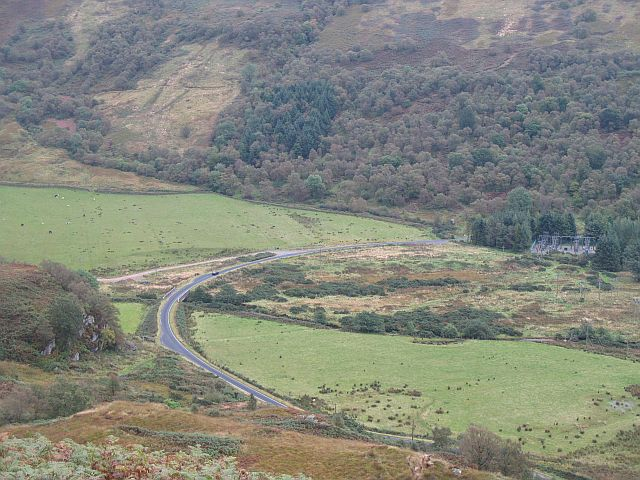
The B836 at the head of Loch Striven

From the A885, the B836 passes through the hamlet of Clachaig and up Glen Lean. At the head of Glen Lean, the road passes along the shore of Loch Tarsan, an artificial lake that forms part of the Striven Hydro-Electric Scheme, at an altitude of 137 metres (449 ft) AMSL. From Loch Tarsan, the road descends steeply down Glen Tarsan to sea level at the head of Loch Striven, passing nearby Ardtaraig on the way. The B836 provides the only road access to the northern half of Loch Striven, which is otherwise devoid of roads.

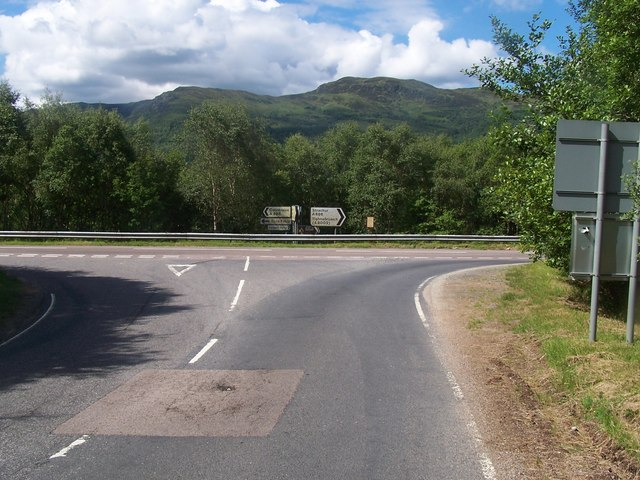
B836 junction with A886

From the head of Loch Striven, the road climbs again to an altitude of 149 metres (489 ft) AMSL on the shoulder of Beinn Bhreac. It then descends to meet the A886 near the ruins of Auchenbreck Castle, about 4 kilometres (2.5 mi) south of Clachan of Glendaruel and 8 kilometres (5.0 mi) north of Colintraive. Tighnabruaich can be reached by turning briefly north up the A886, and then turning south along the A8003.

From Colintraive, a car ferry crosses to Rhubodach on the Isle of Bute. From Portavadie, accessible through Tighnabruaich, another car ferry crosses to Tarbert on the Kintyre peninsula.

== Buses ==
The full length of the B836 is traversed by most journeys of the 478 bus route from Dunoon to Portavadie. The service is operated by West Coast Motors.
