= Loch Tarsan =

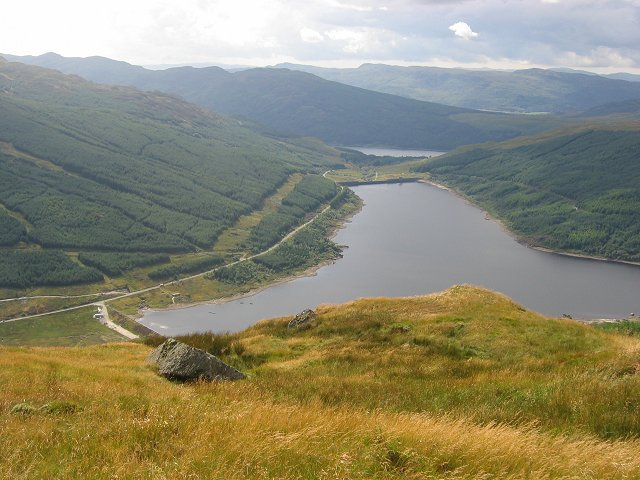
- Loch Tarsan, looking towards Loch Striven and showing both dams

- Location within Argyll and Bute
- Location: Glen Lean, Cowal, Argyll and Bute, Scotland
- Coordinates: 56.010914°N 5.0863659°W, National grid reference NS 07692 84075
- Type: Reservoir
- Primary inflows: Corrachaive Glen
- Primary outflows: Glentarsan Burn
- Basin countries: Scotland, United Kingdom.
- Surface area: 1,100,000 m^{2} (12,000,000 sq ft)
- Surface elevation: 121 m (397 ft)

Loch Tarsan is a freshwater loch and impounding reservoir located on the Cowal peninsula 13 kilometres (8.1 mi) northwest of Dunoon, Argyll and Bute, Scotland. It forms part of the Striven Hydro-Electric Scheme (also known as the Cowal Hydro-Electric Power Scheme), and is accessible via the B836 road that passes along its southern side.

The reservoir sits across the watershed between Glen Tarsan, which drains west into Loch Striven, and Glen Lean, which drains east into the Holy Loch. There are two impounding dams, one for each of the two valleys, resulting in a 'Y' shaped lake. The larger of the two dams is 17.6 metres (58 ft) high and was completed in 1953. The water that is collected in the loch is piped to the hydro-electric generating station, located at Ardtaraig, at the head of Loch Striven.

Angling on the loch is managed by Dunoon and District Angling Club.

== See also ==
- List of reservoirs and dams in the United Kingdom

== Sources ==
- "Argyll and Bute Council Reservoirs Act 1975 Public Register"
- Scottish Places - Cowal Hydro-Electric Power Scheme
