= National Cycle Route 75 =

Long-distance cycling route in South Lanarkshire, Scotland

National Cycle Route 75 runs from Edinburgh to Tarbert on the Kintyre peninsula, via Glasgow. It is often known as the Clyde to Forth cycle route.

Route 75 includes two ferry crossings from Gourock to Dunoon on the Cowal peninsula and from Portavadie (Cowal) to Tarbert on the Kintyre peninsula.

== Route ==
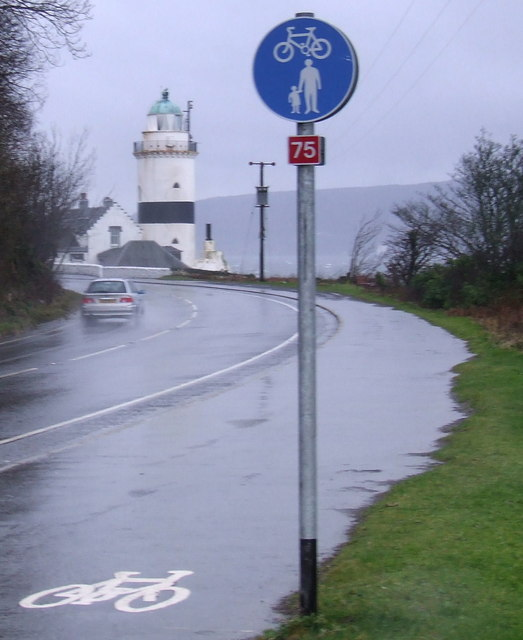
National Cycle Network Route 75 sign

Route 75 Map

=== Edinburgh to Bathgate ===
The route begins in Leith, north-eastern Edinburgh at the mouth of the Water of Leith, which it roughly follows until Warriston, then runs southward through Canonmills and Edinburgh New Town – briefly sharing the route with NCN 1 using Hanover Street, The Mound and George IV Bridge through the city centre to The Meadows – before joining with the eastern terminus of the Union Canal at Fountainbridge which is also the eastern starting point of the Forth and Clyde Canal Pathway (NCN 754). After following the canal path to the aqueduct at Slateford, the 75 route splits from the 754 and returns to the Water of Leith, following the route of the Balerno line trail until its terminus at Balerno on the south-western edge of the city. Thereafter it enters West Lothian, passing through Kirknewton, East Calder, Almondell and Calderwood Country Park, Mid Calder, Livingston and Bathgate.

Edinburgh | Kirknewton | Livingston | Bathgate

=== Bathgate to Glasgow ===
Between Bathgate and Airdrie the route follows alongside the newly reopened Airdrie-Bathgate railway line, passing Armadale, Blackridge and Caldercruix. Where the cycle route merges onto the A89 (Main street) [Plains] then through a short section of residential streets in Airdrie, (Craigneuk, Gartlea and Cairnhill) before proceeding into Coatdyke, the route joins a disused railway line between Airdrie and Coatbridge. The section into Coatbridge town centre is on the alignment of the former Monkland Canal. Beyond Coatbridge the route passes through Tannochside, Uddingston, Newton and Westburn to reach Cambuslang. From Cambuslang to Glasgow the route follows the Clyde walkway.

Bathgate | Airdrie | Coatbridge | Uddingston | Cambuslang | Glasgow

=== Glasgow to Gourock ===
The route runs along the north of the Clyde to the SECC, where it joins NCR 7 through Paisley to Johnstone. It then branches west, following a disused railway track through Bridge of Weir and Kilmacolm to Port Glasgow. After a short residential section, it rejoins the disused railway in an industrial estate, which it follows to Greenock. It then leads to the sea front, and along to Gourock.

A 14-mile (23 km) section of the route between Airdrie and Bathgate closed in October 2008 as part of a £300 million project to reopen the railway. Network Rail built a replacement cycle path.

Glasgow | Paisley | Kilmacolm | Greenock | Gourock

=== Dunoon to Portavadie ===
After catching the ferry from Gourock to cross the upper Firth of Clyde to Dunoon. The route continues along the Cowal peninsula coast, passing the Holy Loch and Sandbank. Then travels on the B836 road through Glen Lean to the head of Loch Striven at Ardtaraig. Then passes the Kyles of Bute passing through Tighnabruaich, to Portavadie. From where another ferry crosses Loch Fyne, connecting the route onto the Kintyre peninsula at Tarbert. On the Kintyre peninsula you can join the National Cycle Route 78 (The Caledonia Way).

Dunoon | Sandbank | Loch Striven | Kyles of Bute | Tighnabruaich | Kames | Millhouse | Portavadie

== See also ==
- Sustrans
