= A886 road =

Main road in Argyll & Bute, Scotland

A886

Route information
- Length: 27 mi (43 km)

Major junctions
- South end: Port Bannatyne, Isle of Bute
- North end: Strachur, Cowal (A815)

Location
- Country: United Kingdom
- Primary destinations: Glendaruel, Colintraive, Rhubodach, Dunans Castle

Road network
- Roads in the United Kingdom; Motorways; A and B road zones

The A886 is a main road in the Argyll and Bute district of Scotland. It runs in a generally north to south direction to the western side of the Cowal Peninsula, before crossing to the Isle of Bute.

For most of its route, the A886 is a two lane road, although a short stretch on Bute is single-track with passing places. It is 43.5 kilometres (27.0 mi) in length.

== Route ==
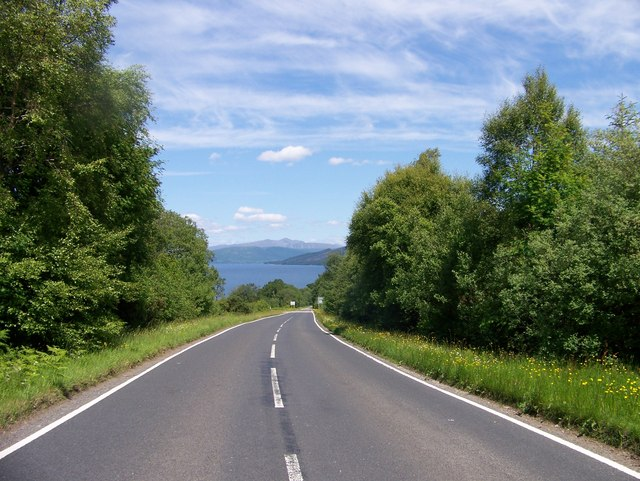
The A886 looking north to Loch Fyne

The northern terminus of the A886 is at Strachur, where it meets the A815 shortly before that road in turn connects with the A83 at the western end of the Rest and be Thankful pass. In the opposite direction, the A815 runs down the eastern side of the Cowal to Dunoon, with its ferries to the south side of the Firth of Clyde. These two routes (the Rest and be Thankful or the Dunoon ferry) provide the principal options connecting the Cowal with Glasgow.

South of Strachur, the A886 briefly runs alongside Loch Fyne before meeting the B8000, which forms the coast road along the Loch Fyne coast of the Cowal. After this junction it turns south-east and climbs into the hills, reaching a summit of 255 metres (837 ft) AMSL. The road then descends through the Glendaruel valley, passing Dunans Castle and Clachan of Glendaruel.

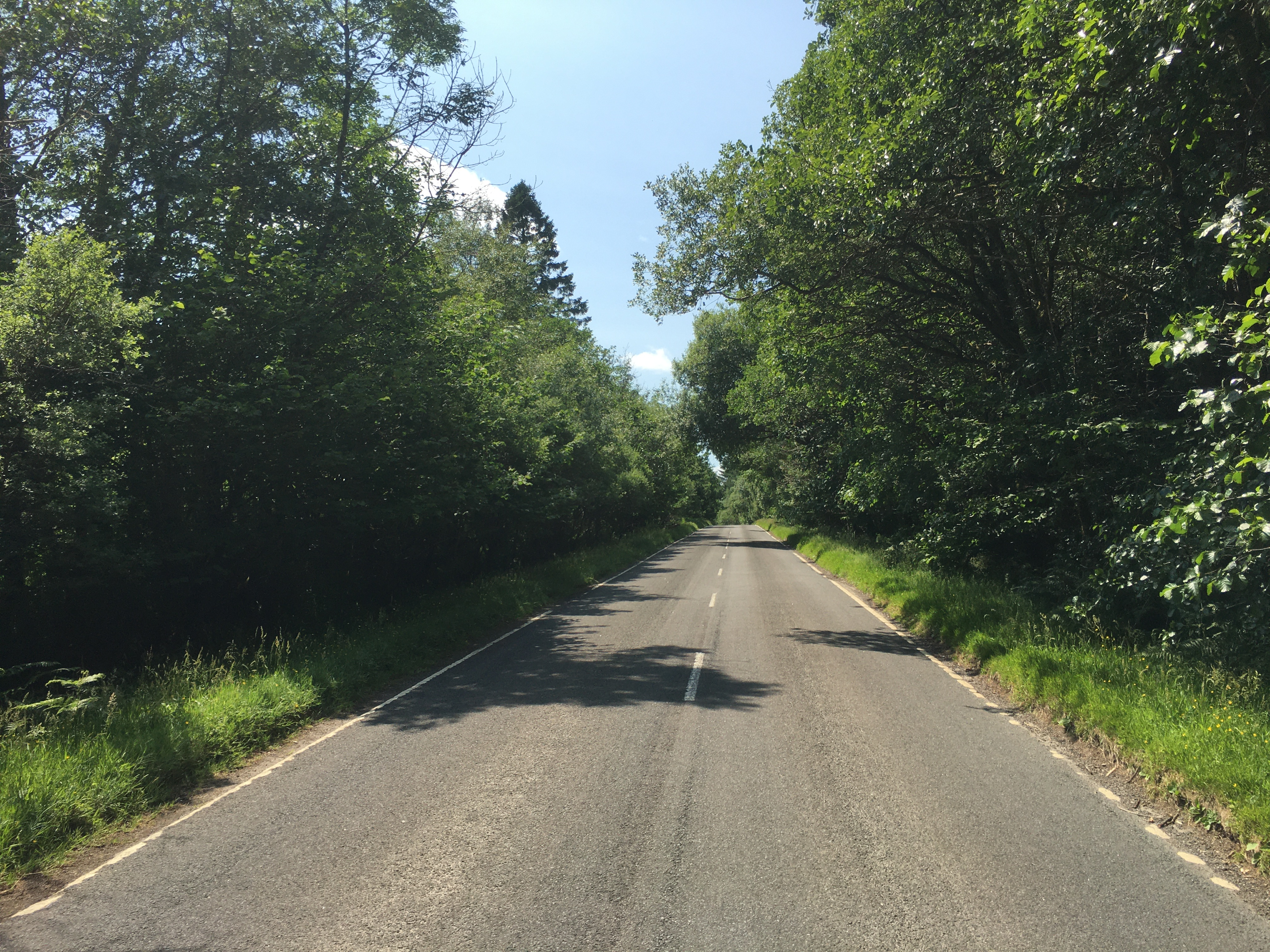
The A886 in Glendaruel

To the south of Clachan of Glendaruel the road meets, in short order, an unclassified road from Otter Ferry to the west, the A8003 down the west side of Loch Riddon to Tighnabruaich, and the B836 east across the head of Loch Striven to Dunoon. From the B836 junction, the A886 follows the east side of Loch Riddon to Colintraive, from where an unclassified road heads east round Strone Point and north a short distance up the west shore of Loch Striven.

The A886, however, crosses on a ferry from Colintraive to Rhubodach on the Isle of Bute. It then follows the eastern side of Bute to Port Bannatyne, where it meets the A844, which encircles the rest of the island and connects to its capital, Rothesay.

== Ferry crossing ==
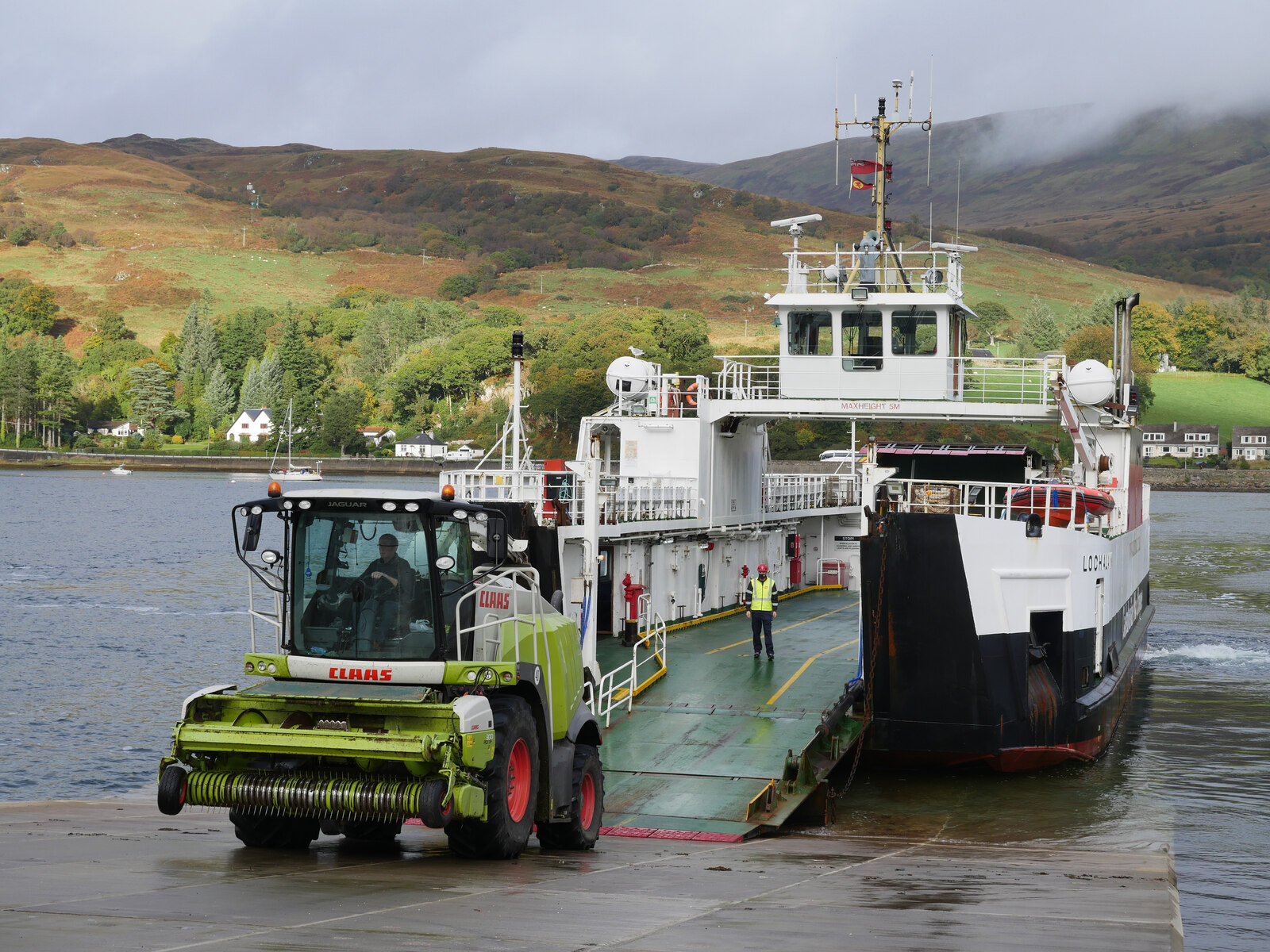
The ferry across the Kyles

The A866 includes a car ferry crossing of the Kyles of Bute, between Colintraive, on the mainland, and Rhubodach, on the Isle of Bute. The service is provided by Caledonian MacBrayne.

== Buses ==
Parts of the A866 is used by the 478 bus route from Dunoon to Portavadie. The service is operated by West Coast Motors.
