= Clachaig =

Settlement in Argyll and Bute, Scotland

Coordinates: 55.988661°N 5.0138990°W

Clachaig: Scottish Gaelic: Clachaig
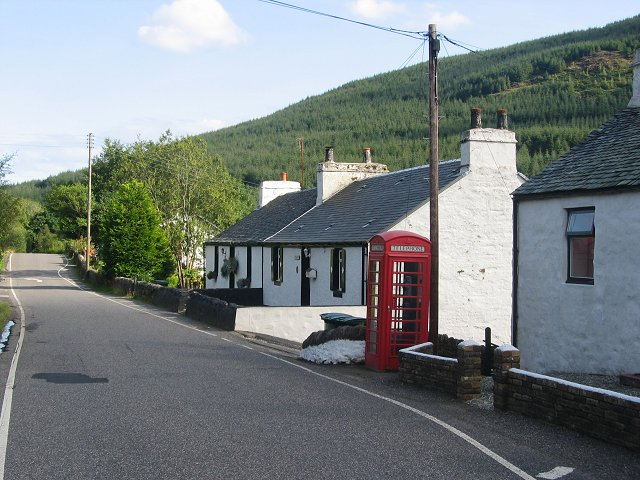
- Clachaig Village

- Location within Argyll and Bute
- OS grid reference: NS 12100 81400
- Council area: Argyll and Bute
- Lieutenancy area: Argyll and Bute
- Country: Scotland
- Sovereign state: United Kingdom
- Post town: DUNOON
- Postcode district: PA23
- Dialling code: 01369
- UK Parliament: Argyll, Bute and South Lochaber
- Scottish Parliament: Argyll and Bute

Clachaig (Scottish Gaelic: Clachaig) is a small settlement in Glen Lean, on the Cowal Peninsula, in Argyll and Bute, west of Scotland. It is located on the B836 road between the Holy Loch and Loch Striven, the hamlet is just over a mile long. Clachaig is a Gaelic word meaning 'stone place'.

The Hamlet consists of twenty-two houses and was built for accommodation for the workers of the powder mill. The mill manufactured gunpowder.

The river at the bottom of the glen is the Blackcraig Burn that joins the Little Eachaig River, then joining the River Eachaig and flowing into the Holy Loch.

== Transportation ==
The settlement is served by the 478 Dunoon–Portavadie bus, operated by West Coast Motors.

== Gallery ==
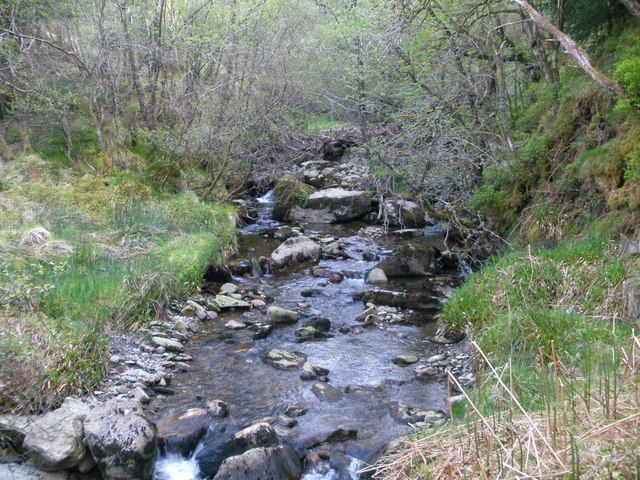
Blackcraig Burn, Clachaig.
