= 478 Dunoon–Portavadie =

Bus route in Argyll and Bute, Scotland

478
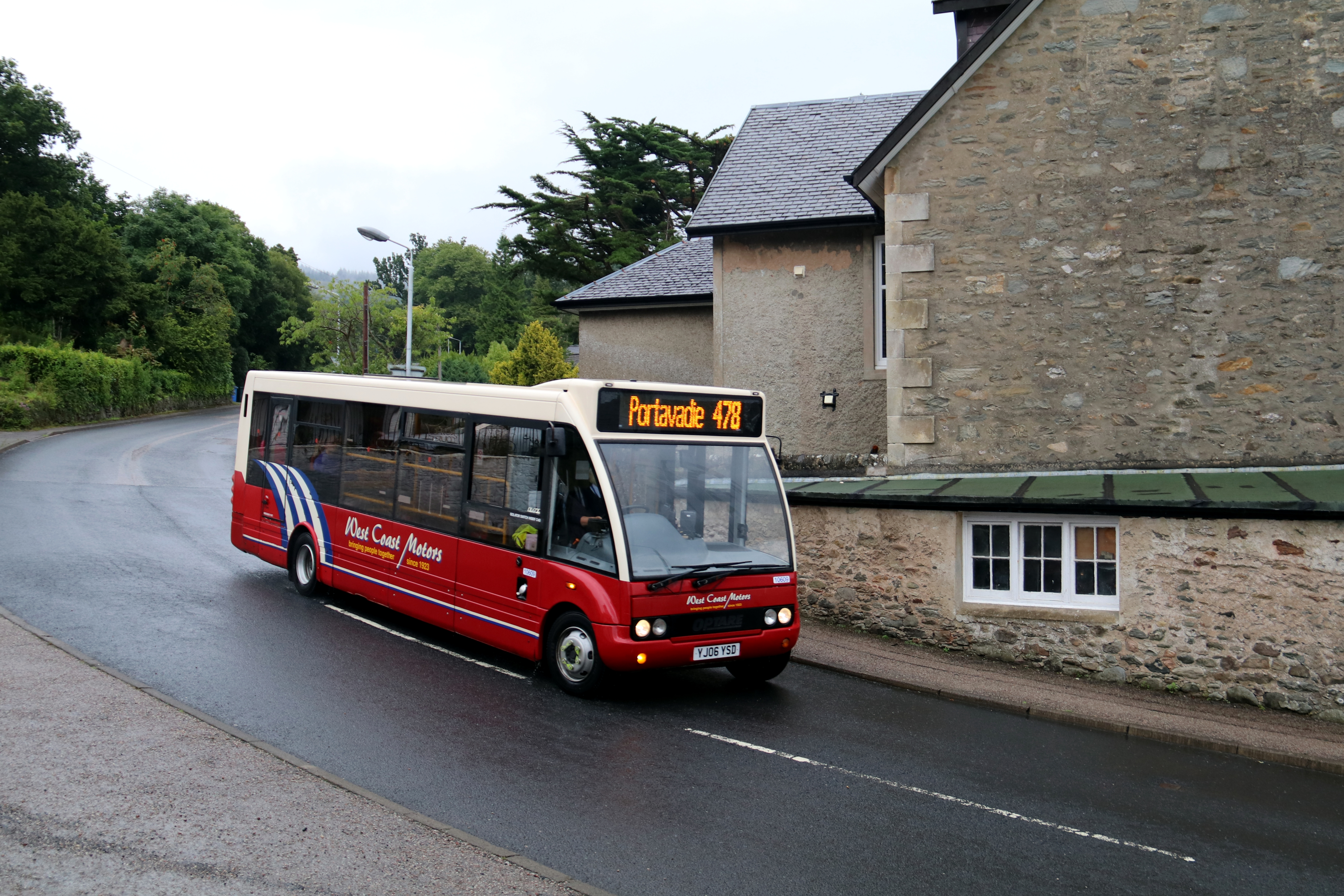
- An Optare Solo M880SL running the 478 route in Tighnabruiach in 2006

Overview
- Operator: West Coast Motors
- Began service: 1993 (33 years ago)

Route
- Start: Dunoon Pier
- Via: Tighnabruiach; Kames
- End: Portavadie
- Length: 28 miles (45 km)

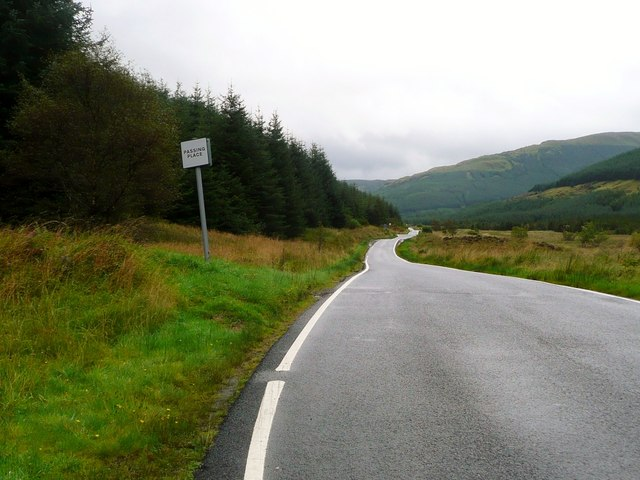
A passing place near Glen Lean on the narrow B836, which forms a large part of the 478's route

The 478 is a bus route on the remote Cowal peninsula in Argyll and Bute, Scotland. It runs between Dunoon and Portavadie via Tighnabruiach and Kames. The route is currently operated by West Coast Motors, which is based in Campbeltown and was established in 1921.

The route is noted for its long stretches of single-track roads with scattered passing places, especially along the B836 between Sandbank and Auchenbreck, at the junction with the A886 Colintraive–to–Strachur road.

== History ==
Strathclyde Partnership for Transport inaugurated route 478, along with routes 477 and 479 in the same area, in October 1993. The drivers of the 477, 478 and 479 dubbed their routes the "Bermuda Triangle" due to their complexity and remoteness.

== Route ==
Although documented as a single route, no journey on the 478 follows exactly the same route as any other journey on the same day.

From Dunoon Pier, the route takes the passenger north through Sandbank on the A885 and A815. Most journeys then turn west along the B836 through Clachaig, Ardtaraig, Loch Striven to the A886 near Auchenbreck. Other journeys instead operate via the A815 to Strachur and then back down the A886 to Auchenbreck.

Some journeys then run south on the A886 to Colintraive, where they connect with the MV Loch Dunvegan on its short ferry crossing to Rhubodach on the Isle of Bute. Some of these journeys terminate at Colintraive, whilst others retrace their route north on the A886, past the junction with the B836 to the junction with the A8003. Yet other journeys run direct from the B836 junction to the A8003 junction.

The route then loops around Loch Ruel to Tighnabruiach, Kames, Millhouse and Portavadie. Here it connects with the ferry crossing to Tarbert on the Kintyre Peninsula.

On weekdays, additional stops in Dunoon, Hunters Quay, Ardnadam and Sandbank are served in the mid-afternoon to support the release of children from local schools.

== Service ==
Given the distance covered by the route (28 miles (45 km)), it runs only eight times a day, Monday to Saturday (four in the morning, four in the afternoon). The first bus departs Dunoon Pier at 5:48 AM (terminating at Tighnabruiach's Royal an Lochan hotel; the second run is the first to terminate at Portavadie ferry terminal); the last one at 5:30 PM. The journey takes between an hour and an hour and a half.
