= Strone Point =

Strone Point may refer to:

- Strone Point (Holy Loch), headland where the Holy Loch meets the Firth of Clyde, on the Cowal peninsular in Argyll & Bute, Scotland
- Strone Point (Loch Ness), headland on Loch Ness occupied by Urquhart Castle, in Inverness-shire, Scotland
- Strone Point (Loch Striven), headland where Loch Striven meets the Kyles of Bute, on the Cowal peninsular in Argyll & Bute, Scotland
