= A886 =

A886 may refer to:

- Opteron
- A886 road, Scotland
