= Tchoupitoulas Street =

Thoroughfare near the Mississippi River, New Orleans

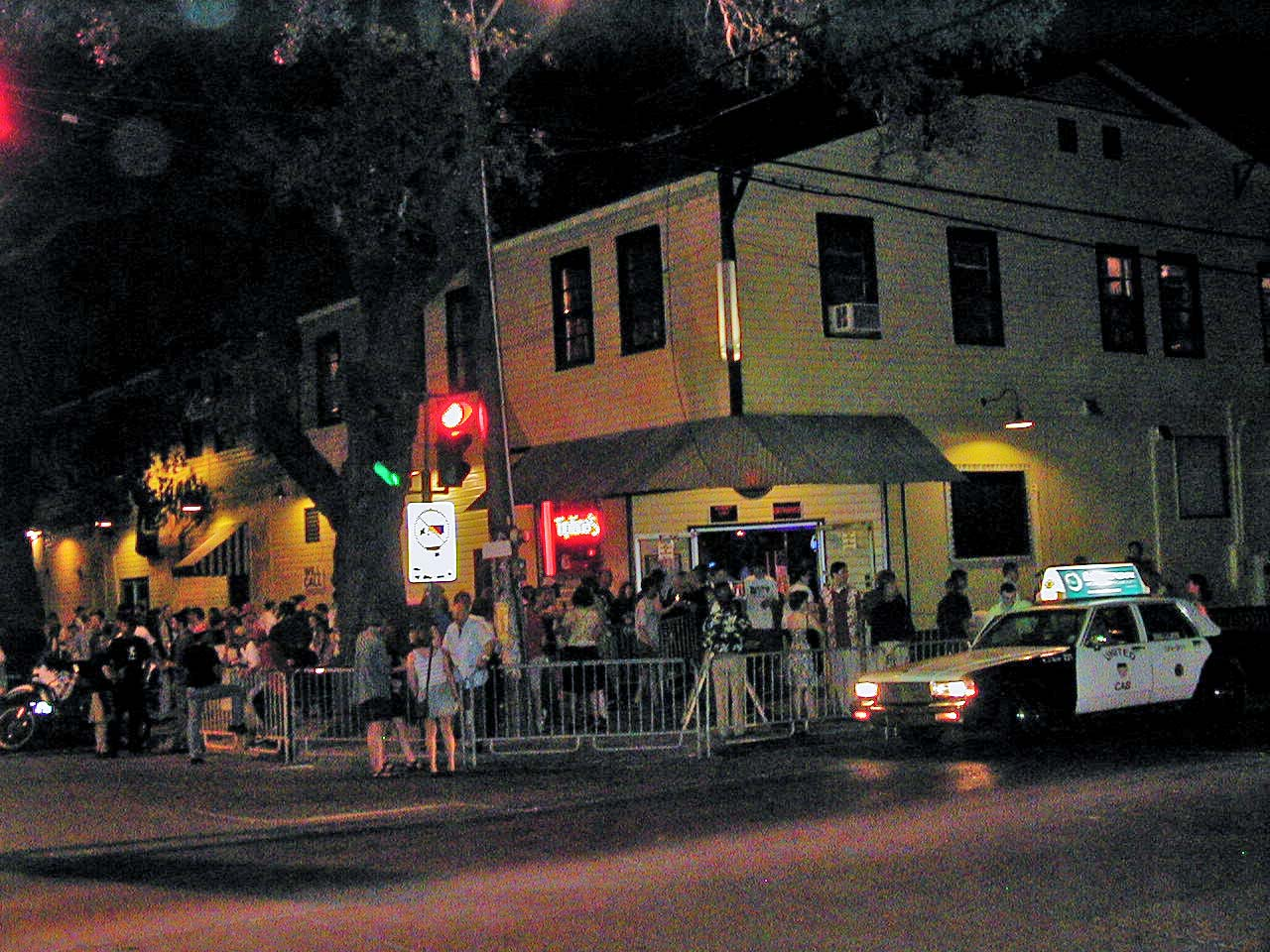
Tipitina's at the corner of Tchoupitoulas and Napoleon

Tchoupitoulas Street (/ˌtʃɒpɪˈtuːləs/ chop-ih-TOO-ləss) is a street in New Orleans, Louisiana, United States. Running through uptown, it is the through street closest to the Mississippi River. Formerly, the street was heavily devoted to river shipping commerce, but as shipping concerns gravitated to other locations in the latter part of the 20th century, more of the street has been utilized for residential and other business purposes.

== Etymology ==
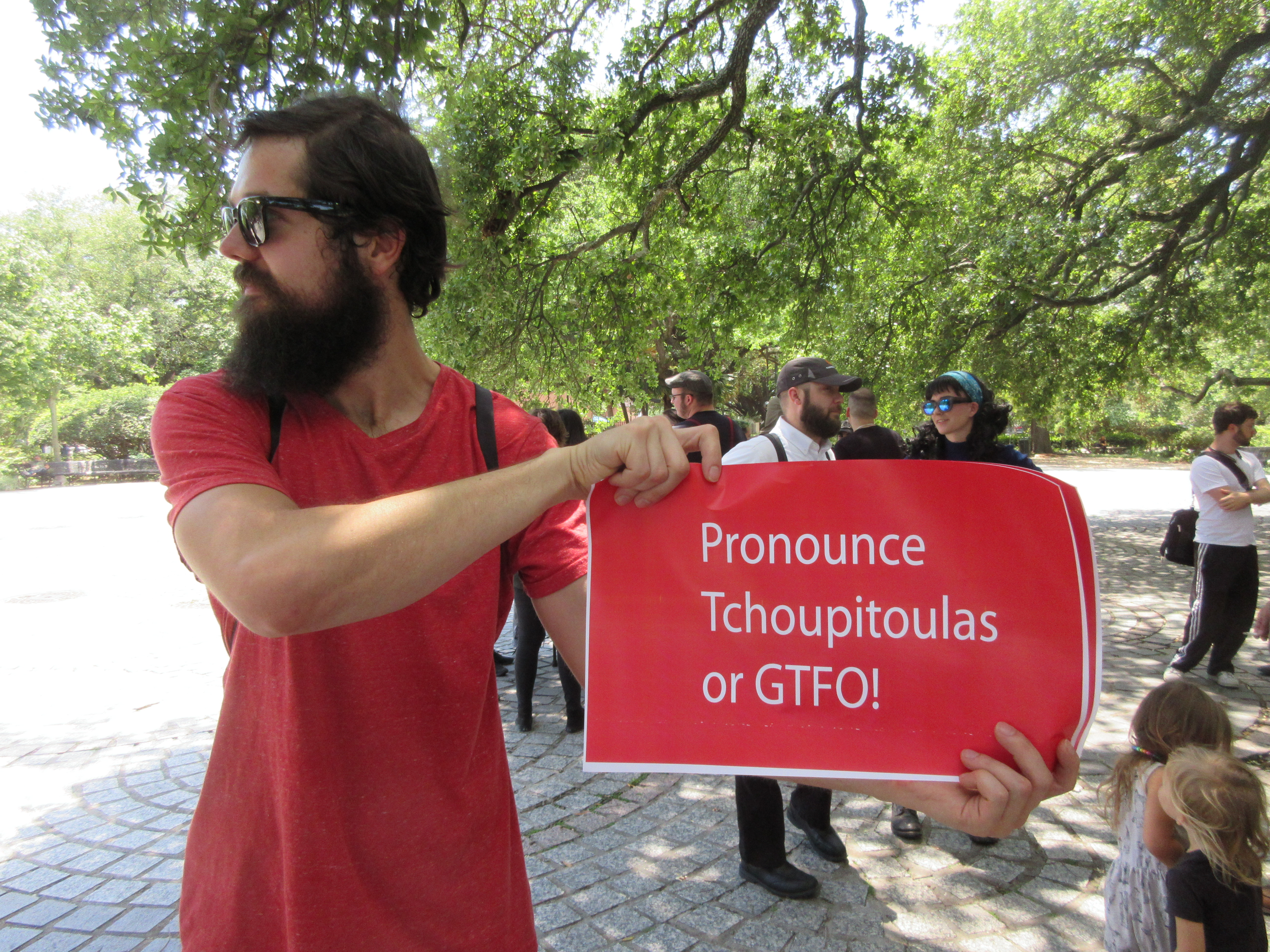
A New Orleans resident challenges out-of-towners arriving to protest against the 2017 removal of the Robert E. Lee Monument. Their inability to pronounce "Tchoupitoulas Street" according to the local fashion would be a shibboleth marking them as outsiders.

The name of the street comes from the name of a Native American tribe that perhaps means "those who live at the river" in Choctaw (hạcha-pit-itula). The tribal village – called the côte (or quartier) des Chapitoulas in the 18th and early 19th centuries – was the headwaters of a bayou also named after the Chapitoulas.

== Location ==
The street starts at the upriver side of Canal Street (the opposite side from the French Quarter) and goes through New Orleans Central Business District (CBD) and uptown, following the curve of the river's crescent bend before coming to its terminus, hitting East Road at Audubon Park.

The equivalent street on the French Quarter side of Canal Street is N. Peters Street, which splits into two streets on the uptown side: one continuing as S. Peters, and the other as Tchoupitoulas.

== See also ==
- List of streets of New Orleans
- The Wild Tchoupitoulas, which also take their name from the Native American tribe
