= Colintraive =

Village in Argyll and Bute, Scotland

Coordinates: 55°55′25″N 05°09′09″W

Colintraive: Scottish Gaelic: Caol an t-Snàimh
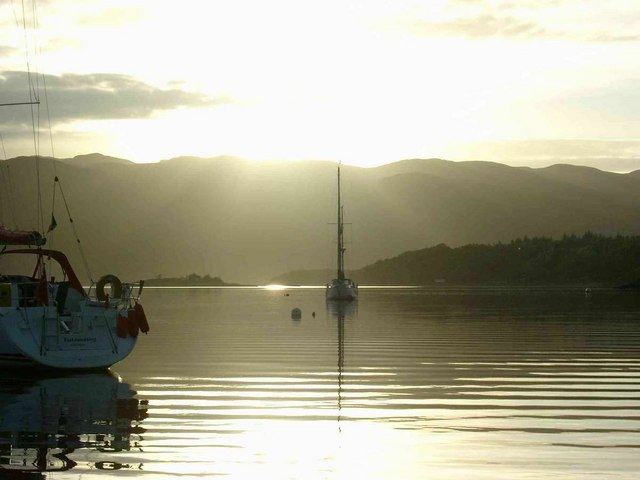
- Colintraive sunset

- Location within Argyll and Bute
- OS grid reference: NS 03500 74300
  - Edinburgh: 75 mi (121 km)
  - London: 367 mi (591 km)
- Council area: Argyll and Bute
- Lieutenancy area: Argyll and Bute
- Country: Scotland
- Sovereign state: United Kingdom
- Post town: COLINTRAIVE
- Postcode district: PA22
- Dialling code: 01700
- UK Parliament: Argyll, Bute and South Lochaber
- Scottish Parliament: Argyll and Bute

Colintraive (Scottish Gaelic: Caol an t-Snàimh) is a village in Argyll and Bute, Scotland. Once the site where cattle were swum across the narrows to the Isle of Bute, the MV Loch Dunvegan — a ferry operated by Caledonian MacBrayne — now provides a link to the island.

== Geography and amenities ==
Colintraive is located on the west coast of the Cowal peninsula. Its area includes Ardtaraig and Loch Striven to the northwest, the head and the shores of Loch Riddon in the northeast, while the village itself faces the Kyles of Bute. The Colintraive area extends further south to Couston and around this hill back into Loch Striven again.

The name Colintraive derives from Gaelic and means "swimming strait" or "swimming narrows". In the past, cattle were swum over from the Isle of Bute to Colintraive on their way to the markets of lowland Scotland.

The village possesses a few facilities, primarily the Colintraive Hotel, and its small adjoining post office. A Heritage Centre opened in 2009.

The nearest town of notable size on the mainland is Dunoon.

== Sports and recreation ==
Colintraive and its nearest neighbouring village of Glendaruel share a shinty team named Col-Glen (which is the combined first segments of both names). An active bowling club meets regularly during the summer and winter season.

Colintraive and Glendaruel are located on the Cowal Way.

== Depopulation and regeneration ==
The name Col-Glen is also used by the local development trust, which was set up to combat the declining population and economy in the two villages. Glendaruel local Michael Russell MSP said of the project: "A small and fragile community like Colintraive and Glendaruel must go forward or it will inexorably decline — in population, in services and in viability." Falling rapidly in recent years, the total adult population of the two villages combined was estimated at 250 in 2009.

For over 60 years, until the late 1990s, Caol Ruadh, one of Colintraive's Victorian mansions set in a 20-acre estate, was used as a residential school for children from Glasgow with special educational needs. Financial concerns caused the Glasgow City Council first to reduce subsidies and later to sell the property after it use reduced when user charges were introduced. In 2012, the grounds were opened as a sculpture park for contemporary sculpture and art works.

The village no longer has its own primary school; pupils are instead bussed to Kilmodan. Secondary-school pupils attend Dunoon Grammar School, the only secondary school in Cowal.

== Transport ==
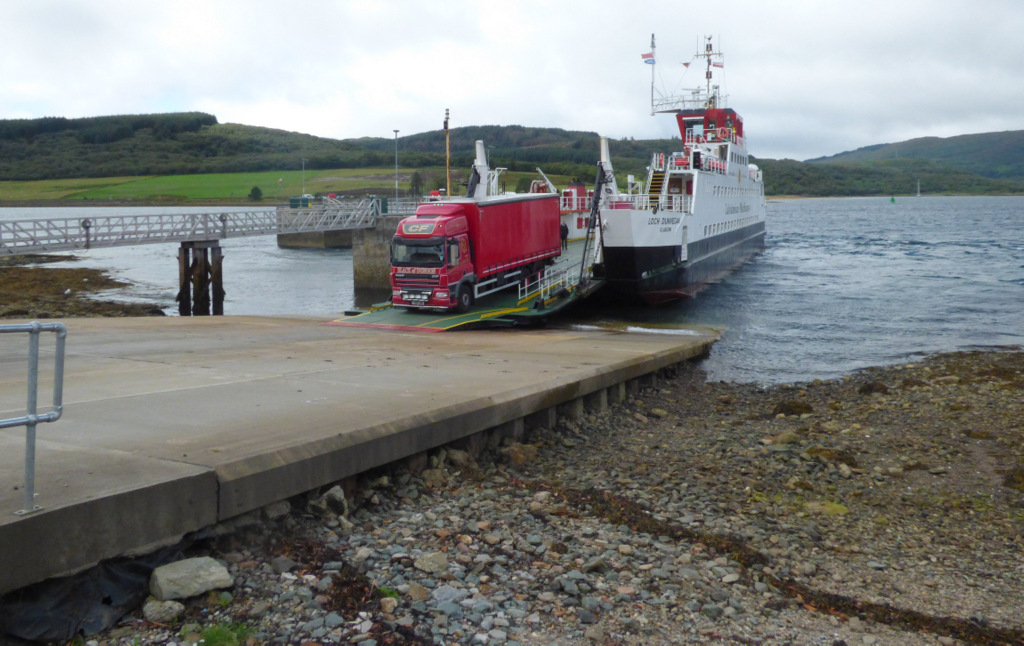
The Colintraive-to-Rhubodach Caledonian MacBrayne ferry, the MV Loch Dunvegan

Colintraive lies at the southern end of the mainland section of the A886, which links to the Isle of Bute. A ferry crosses the 450 yards (410 m) gap to Rhubodach on Bute, giving access to the tourist town of Rothesay. West Coast Motors provides a bus service, including via the 478 Dunoon–Portavadie route.

Preceding station	Ferry	Following station
Terminus	Caledonian MacBrayne; Ferry	Rhubodach

An unclassified road links Colintraive to Strone Point along the shore of the Kyles of Bute, and continues north a short distance up the west shore of Loch Striven.

== Community Council ==
The Colintraive & Glendaruel Community Council consists of six members, and meets every third Monday of the month (except July and December).

== Gallery ==
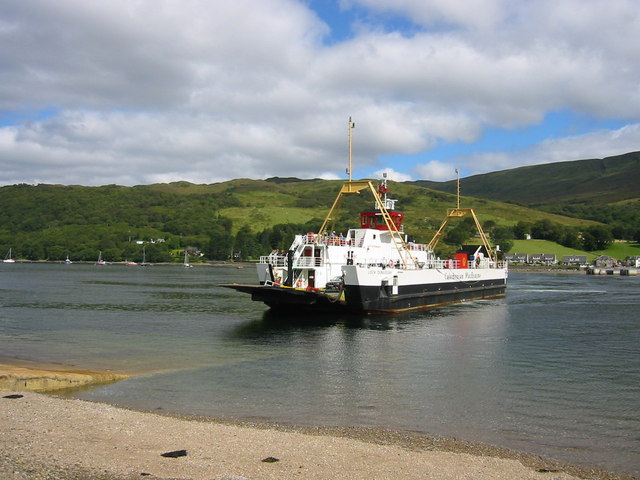
MV Loch Dunvegan

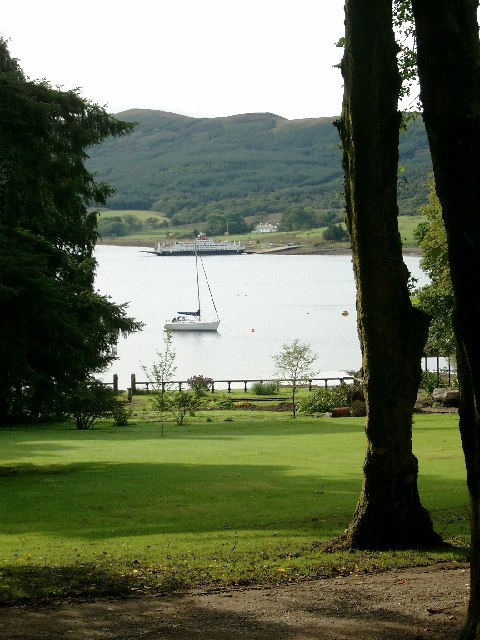
The same ferry, from Dundarrach

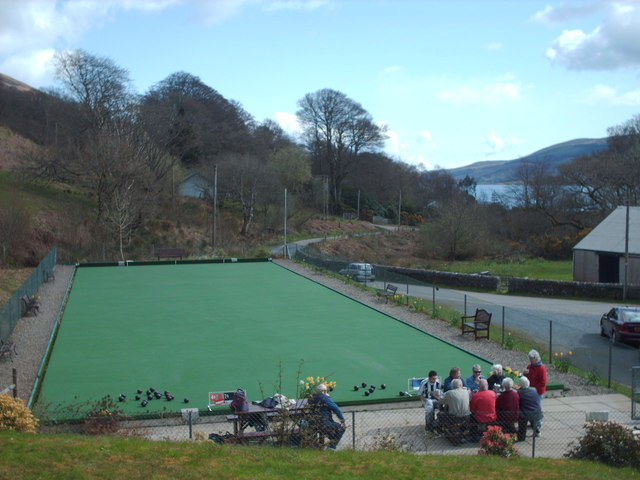
Colintraive bowling green

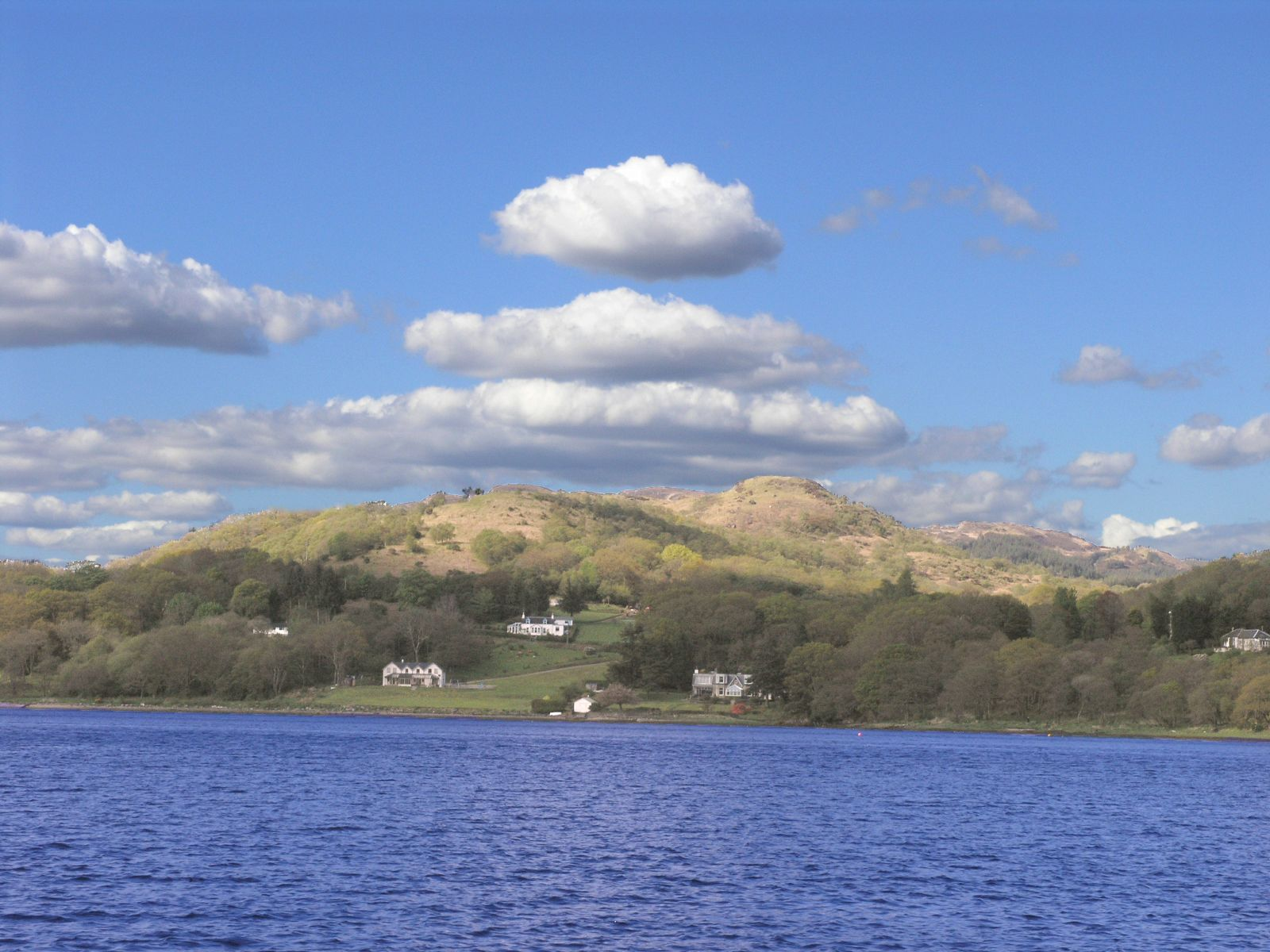
Cloud signals over Colintraive
