= Glen Finart =

Valley in Argyll and Bute, Scotland

Glen Finart Gleann Fhionnaird (Scottish Gaelic)
- Glen
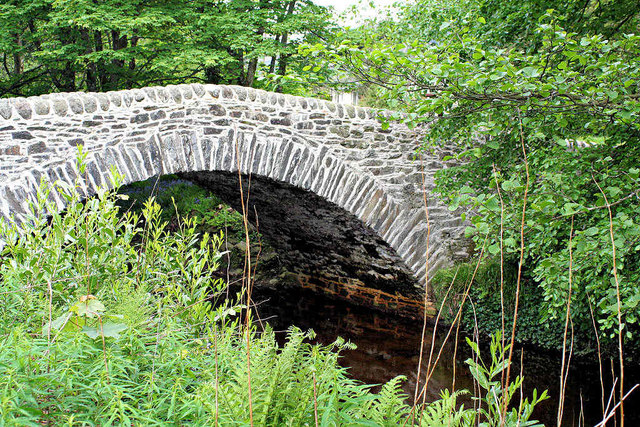
- Barnacabber Bridge - geograph.org.uk

- Coordinates: 56.060°N 4.925°W
- Grid position: NS1732090102
- Location: Cowal, Argyll and Bute, Scotland

Glen Finart (Scottish Gaelic: Gleann Fhionnaird) is a glacially formed glen on the Cowal Peninsula, in Argyll and Bute, west of Scotland. The glen is within the Argyll Forest Park, which is itself within the Loch Lomond and The Trossachs National Park.

Glen Finart runs northwest, from Finart Bay and Ardentinny on the west shore of Loch Long, following the Finart Burn.

Glenfinart House, of the Glen Finart Estate a Grade B listed house, was destroyed by a fire in the 1960s; the only remaining part of the house is the tower.
