= Little Eachaig River =

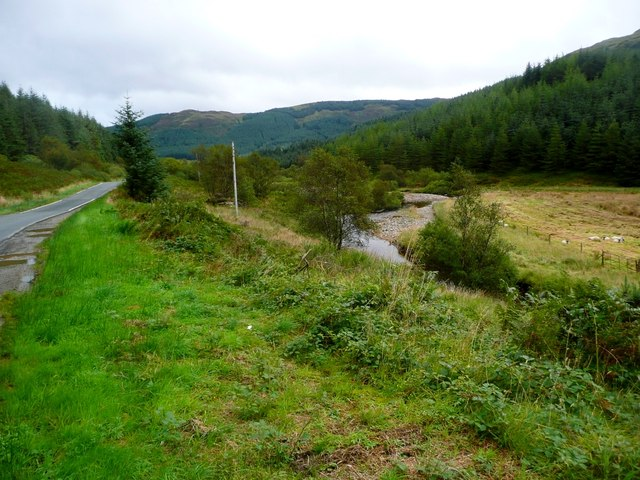
- The river flowing beside the B836
- Etymology: place of horses

Physical characteristics
- Source
  - location: Cowal
  - coordinates: 55.99500707°N 5.0521662°W
- Mouth: Holy Loch
  - location: Cowal
  - coordinates: 55.998381°N 4.9517269°W
  - elevation: Sea level

The Little Eachaig River is a watercourse in Argyll and Bute, Scotland. It is sourced on the hills near Glen Lean and largely runs parallel to the B836 road as it leads east to join the A815 road at Dalinlongart, near which the A815 crosses the river. Here it loops briefly to the north, before emptying into the Holy Loch at its head, just south of the River Eachaig, from which this river takes its name.
