= Colintraive Hotel =

Hotel in Argyll and Bute

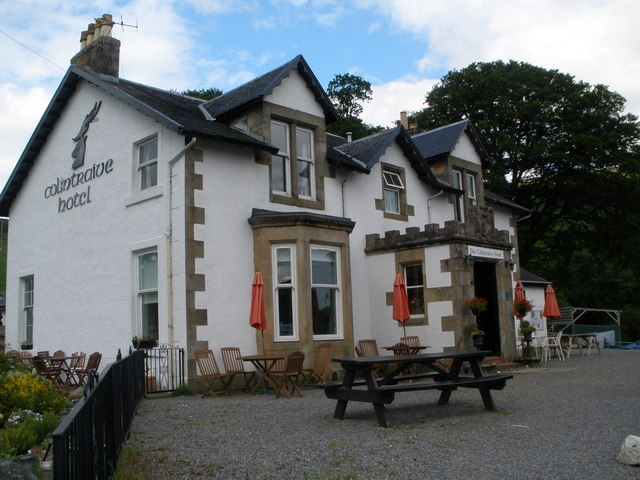
- The building in 2011
- Interactive map of the Colintraive Hotel area
- Alternative names: The Colintraive

General information
- Type: Hotel and restaurant
- Location: Colintraive; Argyll and Bute, Scotland
- Coordinates: 55°55′26″N 5°09′02″W
- Completed: 19th century

Other information
- Public transit: Garelochhead

Website
- www.colintraivehotel.com

The Colintraive Hotel (also known as The Colintraive) is a hotel and pub in Colintraive, Argyll and Bute, Scotland. It was formerly a hunting lodge for John Crichton-Stuart, 7th Marquess of Bute. It stands a few yards from the eastern shores of the Kyles of Bute and the ferry crossing of the 400-yard gap to Rhubodach on Bute, currently provided by the MV Loch Dunvegan.

Jazz guitarist Ken Sykora owned the hotel for around five years during the 1970s.

In the 1880s, the hotel was owned by Andrew Turner. In the 1890s, it was owned by a Mrs Turner.

== Gallery ==
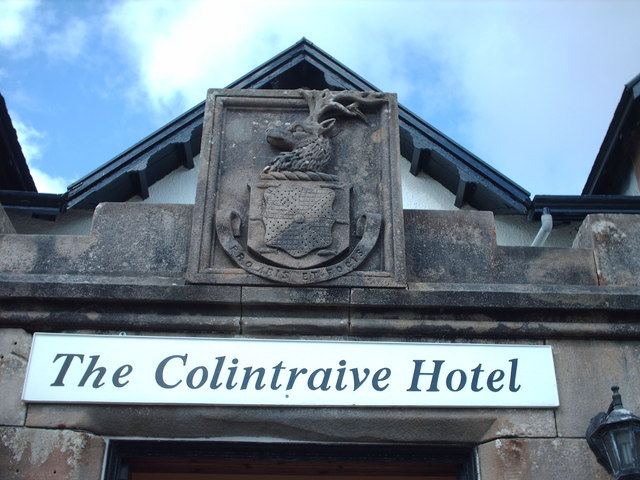
Carving detail above the main entrance

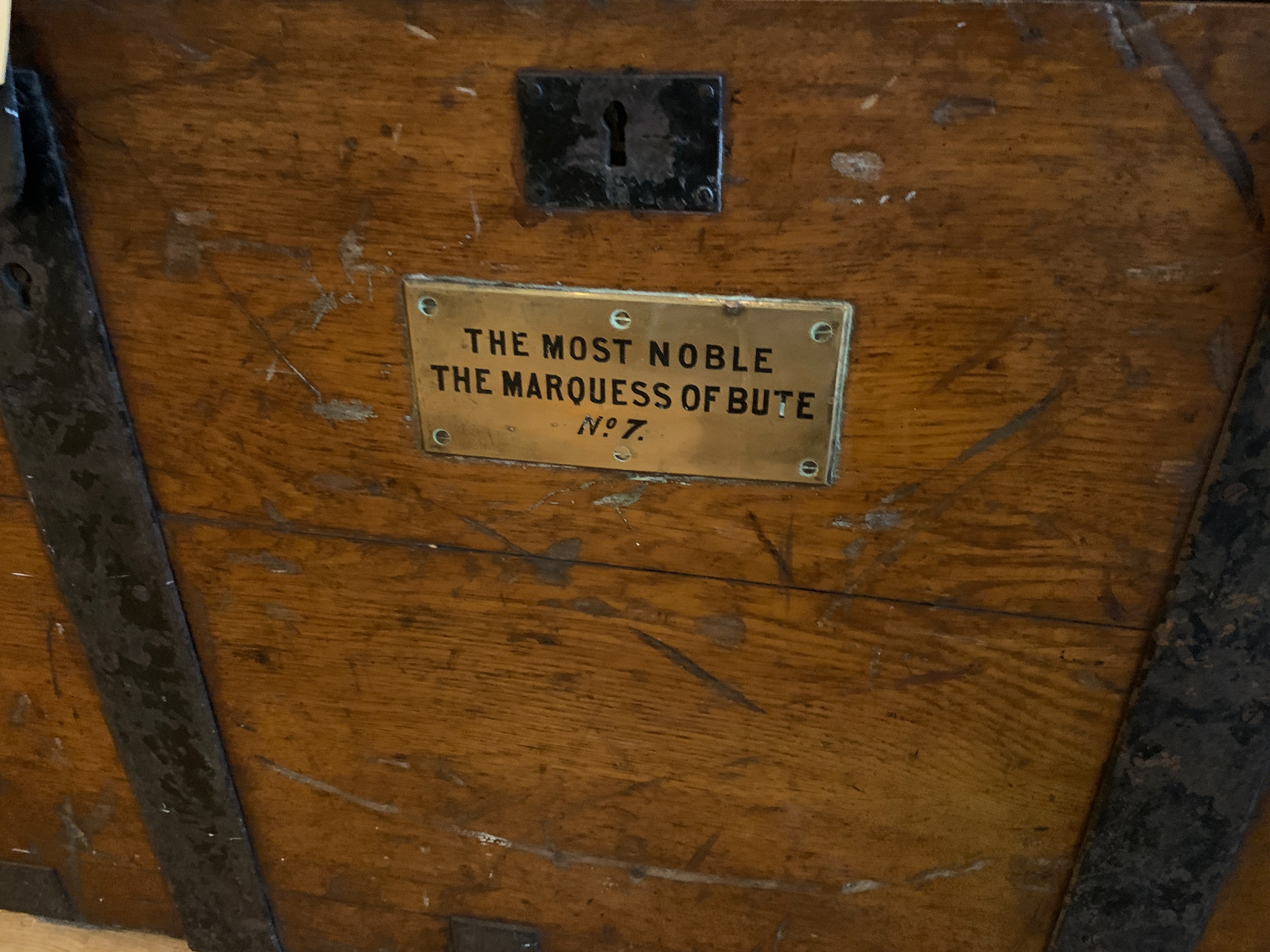
An ammunition chest of John Crichton-Stuart, 7th Marquess of Bute, inside the hotel

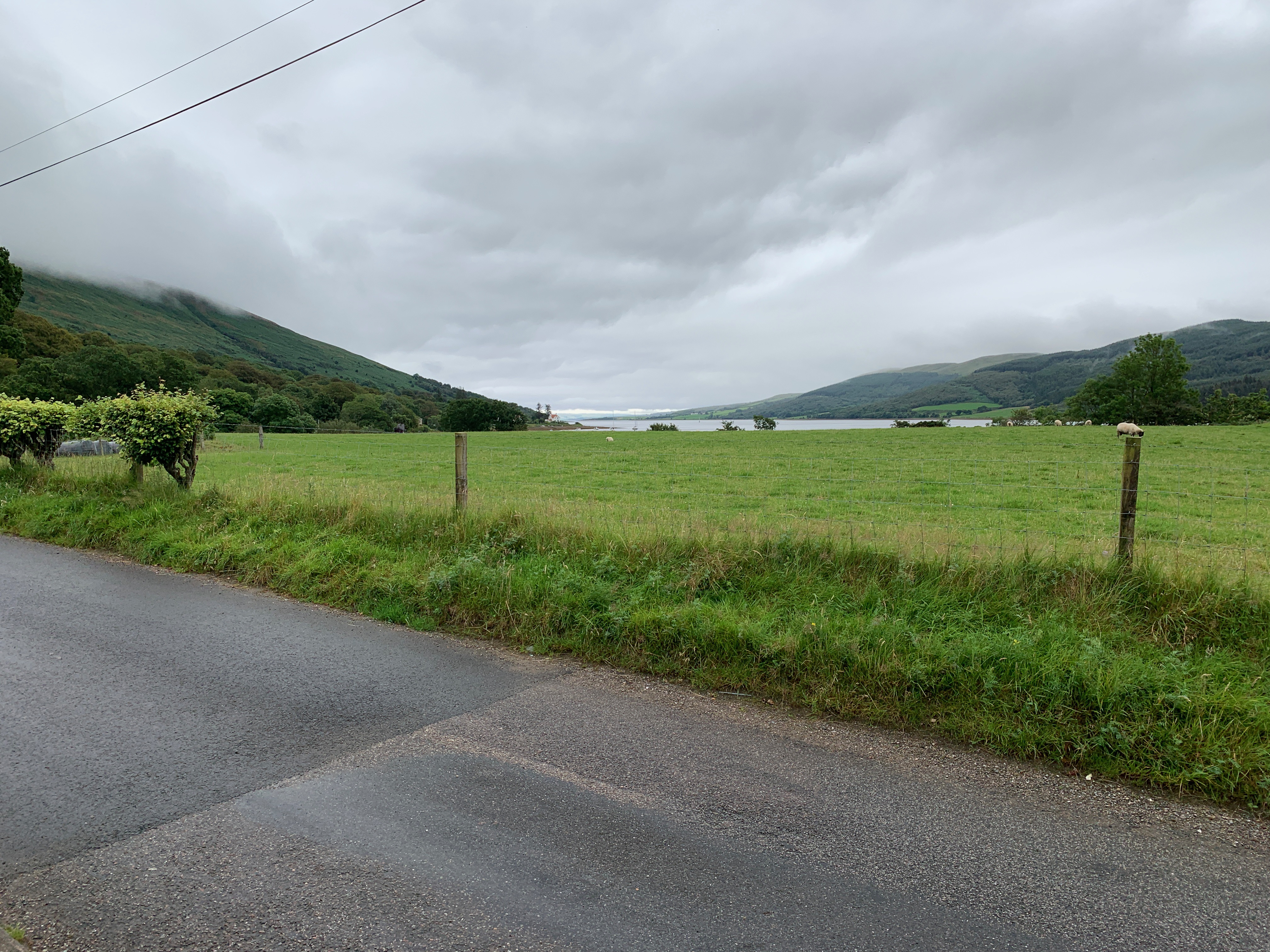
View of the Kyles of Bute from the sitting area in front of the main entrance
