= Strone Point (Loch Striven) =

Headland in Argyll and Bute, Scotland

- Headland
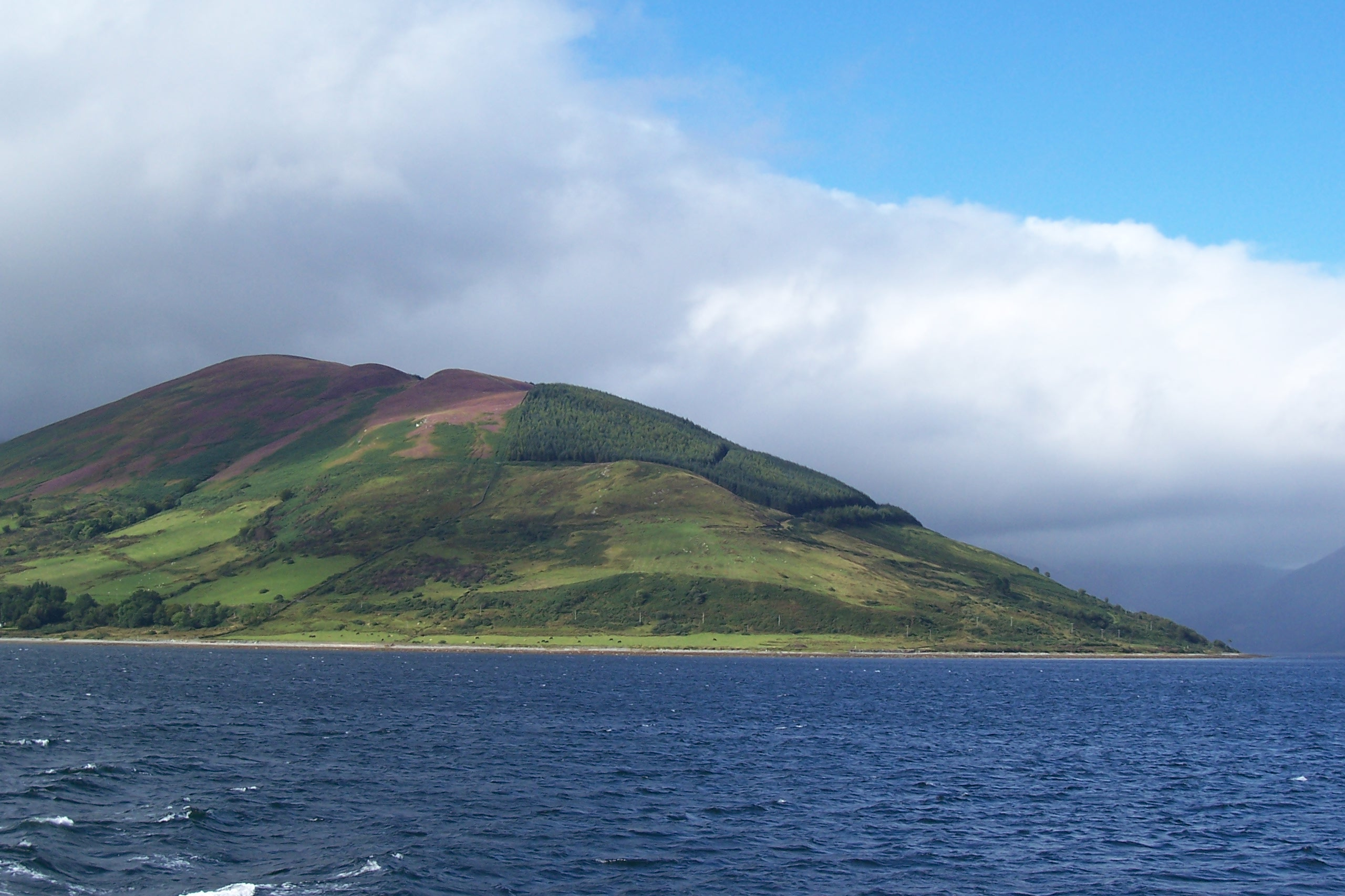

- Location within Scotland
- Coordinates: 55.897582°N 5.078574°W
- Grid position: NS076714
- Location: Cowal, Argyll and Bute, Scotland

Strone Point is a headland on the Cowal peninsula in Argyll and Bute, Scotland. It lies to the east of the village of Colintraive, at the southern end of the west shore of Loch Striven.

Offshore of the point, the waters of the Kyles of Bute, to the west, and Loch Striven, to the north, meet the Firth of Clyde, to the south and east. The point faces across this meet towards Ardyne Point, on the far side of Loch Striven, and the coast of Ayrshire. The slopes of Beinn Bhreac rise behind the point.

An unclassified road links Strone Point to Colintraive along the shore of the Kyles of Bute, and continues north a short distance up the west shore of Loch Striven.
