= Striven Hydro-Electric Scheme =

Power station near Ardtaraig, Scotland

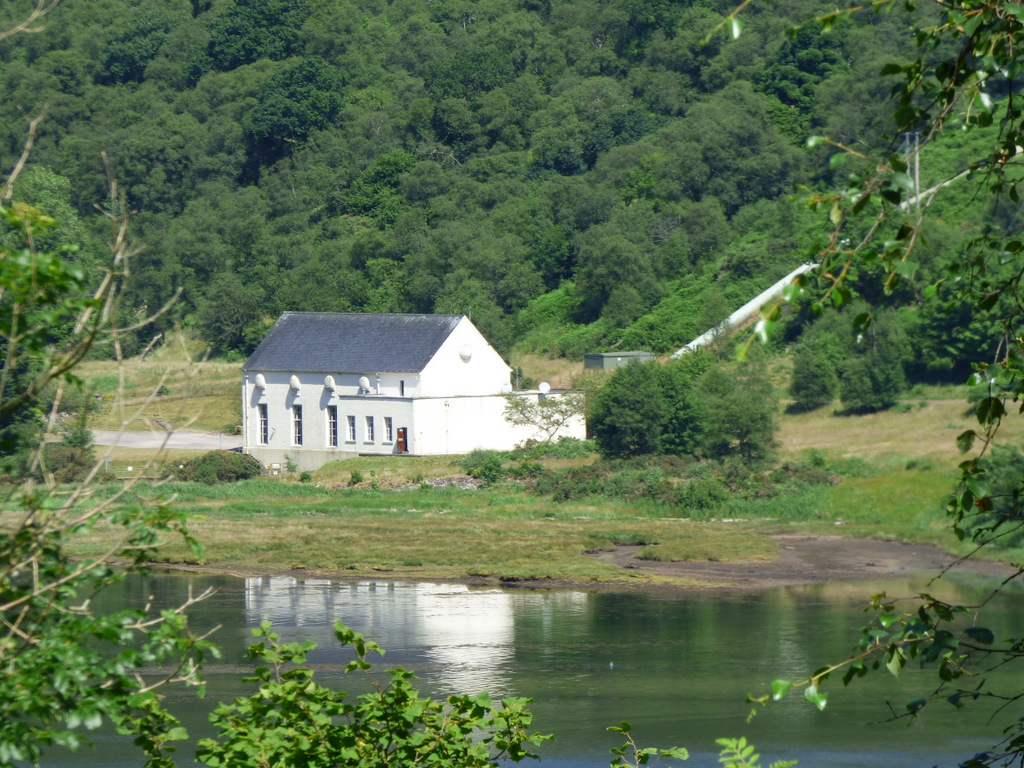
- Striven power station and pipeline

- Location within Argyll and Bute
- Country: Scotland
- Location: Ardtaraig, Argyll and Bute
- Coordinates: 56.0091°N 5.1197°W
- Purpose: Power
- Status: Operational
- Opening date: 1951
- Owner: SSE

Striven Hydro-Electric Scheme is a small-scale hydro-electric power station, built by the North of Scotland Hydro-Electric Board and commissioned in 1951. It is located near Ardtaraig on the Cowal Peninsula, part of Argyll and Bute, west of Scotland. It is sometimes known as the Cowal Hydro-Electric Scheme. It was originally designed to supply power to the remote communities on the peninsula, but is now connected to the National Grid.

== History ==
The North of Scotland Hydro-Electric Board was created by the Hydro-electric Development (Scotland) Act 1943, a measure championed by the politician Tom Johnston while he was Secretary of State for Scotland. Johnston's vision was for a public body that could build hydro-electric stations throughout the Highlands. Profits made by selling bulk electricity to the Scottish lowlands would be used to fund "the economic development and social improvement of the North of Scotland." Private consumers would be offered a supply of cheap electricity, and their connection to that supply would not reflect the actual cost of its provision in remote and sparsely populated areas.

The chairman of the new Board was to be Lord Airlie, who had initially been critical of the 1943 Act because its scope was too limited. The deputy chairman and chief executive was Edward MacColl, an engineer with wide experience of hydro-electric projects and electrical distribution networks. It soon became clear that MacColl intended to push ahead with the aspirations of the Act at breakneck speeds. He produced a list of 102 potential sites in just three months, and in June 1944, the first constructional scheme was published. This was for the Loch Sloy scheme, which had a ready market for bulk supplies to nearby Clydeside, but it included two smaller schemes, to demonstrate the Board's commitment to supplying remote areas.

Striven was another small-scale scheme, and when it was commissioned in 1951, it supplied power to the remote communities of the Cowal peninsula. The turbine house and cottages for the staff were designed by the architect Reginald Fairlie, who was one of the architectural advisors for the North of Scotland Hydro-Electric Board. The Board appointed three Scottish architects to act as architectural advisors in 1943, and their role was to judge competitive entries submitted by others, but by 1947 this model had been abandoned, and Fairlie, together with James Shearer and Harold Tarbolton designed the buildings themselves. With a steeply pitched roof and large rectangular windows, Striven turbine house looks almost ecclesiastical, and fits in well with other buildings in the locality.

The Glentarsan Burn drained a large area to the east of the power station site, and a water supply was provided by building Tarsan Dam across the valley, to create Loch Tarsan. The dam is around 1,000 feet (300 m) long and 90 feet (27 m) high. To prevent water overflowing down Glen Lean as the water levels rose, Col Dam was constructed at the head of Glen Lean, thus giving Loch Tarsan a triangular shape. A large number of small streams which drain the foothills of the surrounding peaks combine in Glen Tarsan to feed the reservoir. These are supplemented by an aqueduct, which collects water from the Corrachaive Glen and several streams that would otherwise drain into Glen Lean. A second conduit runs along the north-west side of Glen Lean, where intakes intercept streams that drain the foothills of Sgorach Mòr. Both feed into the reservoir near Col Dam, while another conduit collects water from Garbh Allt Mòr and another un-named stream close to Tarsan Dam. From a valve tower at Tarsan Dam, a pressure tunnel carries water through the hills to the north-west of the dam, and a surface pipeline completes the route to the turbine house. The pressure tunnel is around 4,000 feet (1,200 m) long and has a cross section which is horse-shoe shaped. It is fully lined, and around 6.5 feet (2.0 m) in width. This provides a head of 400 feet (120 m) to the horizontal Francis turbines in the turbine house, which is located next to the B836 road on the shores of Loch Striven, to the north of the hamlet of Ardtaraig.

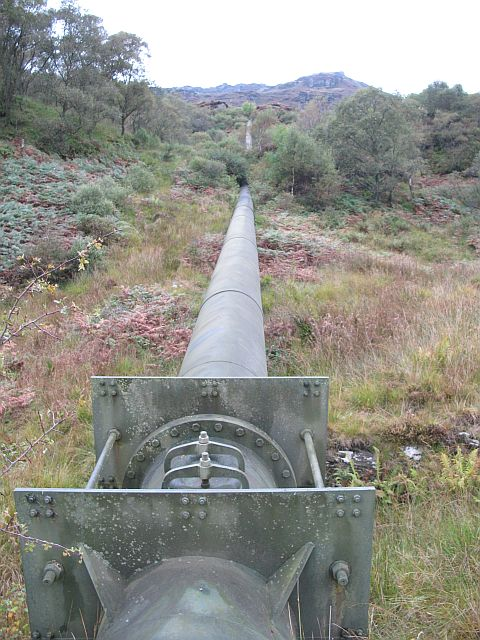
The Riddon pipeline collects water from streams to the west of the power station

Additional water is collected from the foothills of the Cruach nan Cuilean mountain to the north-west of the power station. There is a small dam on the Tamhnich Burn close to a hill called Tom a' Chodail. An open aqueduct, marked as a conduit on maps, runs from there eastwards following the 490-foot (150 m) contour, before turning to the north and entering a tunnel through A' Cruach. It emerges as a pipeline close to the 460-foot (140 m) contour and continues northwards, descending to around 312 feet (95 m) to join another pipeline, descending from further west. This collects water from several tributaries of the Balliemore Burn, although the intakes are not shown of Ordnance Survey maps. The pipeline continues down to the valley floor, passing under the B836 road and over the Balliemore Burn, to deliver water to the power station.

The scheme was designed to serve residents on the Cowal Peninsula, together with the Isle of Bute and the Isle of Cumbrae. At the time, the population was 25,400, spread over an area of 508 square miles (1,320 km^{2}). In order to achieve this, some 250 miles (400 km) of overhead high- and low-voltage power lines were constructed. The Isle of Bute was supplied by 22 kV submarine cables, and another submarine cable, 2.5 miles (4.0 km) long and operating at 11 kV connected Bute to Cumbrae.

In early 1957, Lord Lucas of Chilworth asked questions in the House of Lords about the costs of Scottish hydro-electricity. Lord Strathclyde stated that for Striven, the capital cost of the project was £356 per kW, towards the higher end of the 27 schemes mentioned, and considerably higher than the average cost of £175 per kW. The scheme was the North of Scotland Hydro-Electric Board's Constructional Scheme No. 4 and No. 69, and the first stage was commissioned in 1951. Payne states that the turbine could produce 6 MW, but more recent accounts state that it can produce 8 MW, with the reservoir providing a head of 404 feet (123 m).

=== Operation ===
The power station ran in its original form for around 45 years, although ownership changed in 1989/90, when the electricity industry was privatised, and all of the assets of the North of Scotland Hydro-Electric Board passed to Scottish Hydro-Electric. The company merged with Southern Electric in 1998, to become Scottish and Southern Energy, which since 2010 has been known as SSE.

The new owners commissioned a noise reduction programme in June 1995, with acoustic consultants Spectrum managing a project to reduce the noise made by the Francis turbine, and noise in the turbine house generally. The turbine was refurbished in 2002.

== Hydrology ==
The surface level of Loch Tarsan is 407 feet (124 m) above Ordnance datum (AOD), it covers 0.40 square miles (1.04 km^{2}), and drains an area of 3.84 square miles (9.95 km^{2}).

GlenTarsan Burn, the river below Tarsan Dam, is not normally supplied with compensation water from the reservoir. In 2011 the Scottish Environment Protection Agency (SEPA) held a consultation on the effects on water quality where rivers had been modified by the construction of hydro-electric dams. The Tay District Salmon Fisheries Board made a response, which looked at all of the Scottish rivers classified as heavy modified water bodies under the Water Framework Directive because of hydro-electric schemes. Most had failed to reach good status by 2015, which was a key component of the directive. They estimated the quantities of compensation water that would be needed, and the amount by which electricity generation would be reduced if this amount of water was regularly discharged to maintain river habitats. For the Glentarsan Burn, they estimated that 10.88 Megalitres per day (Mld) would be needed, and that this would reduce energy production by 1.119 GWh per year, while for the Bailliemore Burn the extra compensation flow would be 2 Mld, reducing production by a further 0.219 GWh per year. This amounts to a reduction of about six per cent, since the scheme produces around 22 GWh per year.

== Bibliography ==
- Fleetwood, David; et al. (2010). MacDowell, Dawn (ed.). Power to the People - the built heritage of Scotland's hydroelectric power. Historic Scotland. ISBN 978-1-84917-036-9.
- Miller, James (2002). The Dam Builders - Power from the Glens. Birlinn. ISBN 978-1-84158-225-2.
- NoSHEB (1948). Constructional Schemes. North of Scotland Hydro-Electric Board.
- Payne, Peter L (1988). The Hydro. Aberdeen University Press. ISBN 978-0-08-036584-8.
- Reeves, Julian, ed. (2018). Power from the Glens - 75th Anniversary edition. SSE. ISBN 978-1-5272-2500-8.
- Summers, David (February 2012). "Analysis of the water flow requirements, etc" (PDF). Tay District Salmon Fisheries Board. Archived (PDF) from the original on 22 December 2023.
- Wood, Emma (2002). The Hydro Boys. Luath Press. ISBN 978-1-84282-016-2.
