= Dunans Castle =

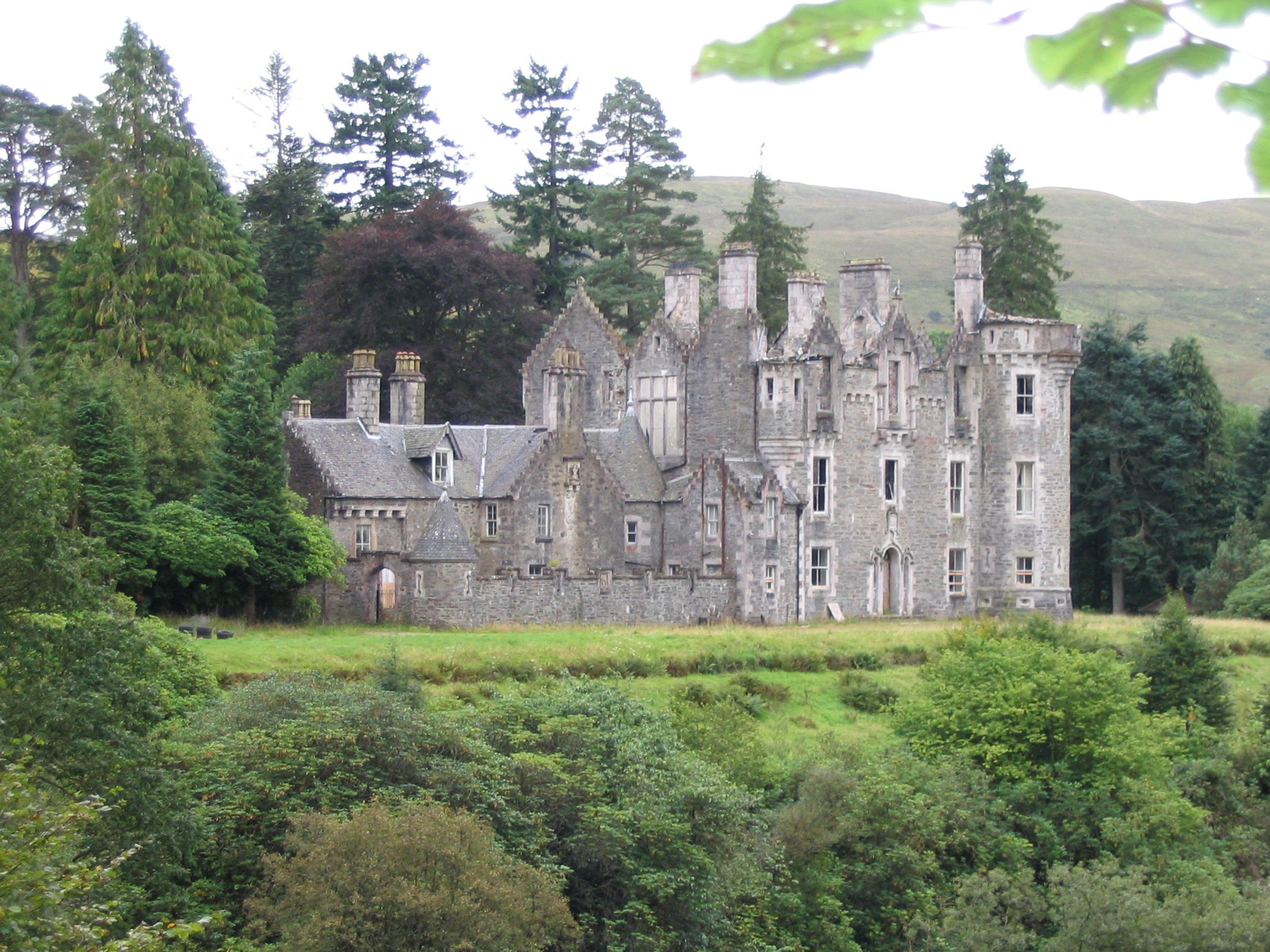
- Dunans Castle viewed from the road, the still residential Dunans House is visible on the left.

- Location within Argyll and Bute

General information
- Status: Fire damaged ruin
- Type: Mock castle
- Location: Glendaruel, Cowal Peninsula, Argyll and Bute, Colintraive, Scotland, United Kingdom
- Coordinates: 56.072485°N 5.1496005°W, National grid reference NS 04064 91102
- Owner: Charles Selwyn Dixon-Spain & Sadie Michaela Dixon-Spain

Dunans Castle (/ˈdʌnənz/) is an historic structure located in Glendaruel, on the Cowal peninsula, Argyll and Bute, Scotland. The property is owned by Charles and Sadie Dixon-Spain. A property at Dounens was shown on maps in 1590; Dunans House was elaborated into its present mock castle form in 1864. Once part of a much larger estate the property presently includes 16 acres (65,000 m^{2}) of ground and in 2001 was ruined by fire.

== History ==
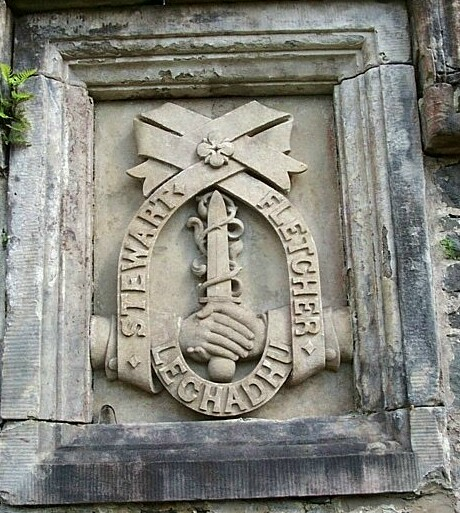
This device, bearing the motto LECHADHU, represents the strong ties between the Fletcher Clan and the Stewarts of Appin.

For over two centuries Dunans was home to the Fletcher Clan who moved to the site between 1715 and 1745 carrying with them the door of their previous home at Achallader Castle (the door was used for the private chapel and was reported missing in 1999). The original mansion-style house (to the left in the picture) was extended into its present dramatic Franco-baronial "castle" form by the architect Andrew Kerr with the additions consisting of four main apartments and 6 bedrooms. The building passed out of Fletcher hands in 1997 when the entire 3000 acre Dunans estate was sold off by Colonel Archibald Fletcher's heirs and subsequently split up. Following a number of financial problems, the Category B listed castle was gutted by fire on 14 January 2001 while being run as a hotel and the building was left as a ruin. The fire began in the attic space of the castle section and destroyed three floors with only the pre Victorian west wing surviving undamaged. The owner Ewa Lucas-Gardener had ignored fire safety experts warnings that the building's fireplaces were unsafe and abandoned the building after the insurers refused to pay out. Now under new ownership, the site, including a Victorian path network, has undergone some restoration supported by the Dunans Charitable Trust. The castle was reported to have three resident ghosts.

=== Present day ===
Dunans Castle Limited, which runs the ScottishLaird.com website, published the Conservation Plan for Dunans in April 2014. Written by conservation architect Robin Kent, the book outlines the programme for the restoration of the castle and the bridge.

The regional blog ForArgyll.com is run from the site as is the Walking Theatre Company. The building remains in the at-risk category of the Buildings at Risk Register and is described as being in very poor condition.

== Bridge and mausoleum ==
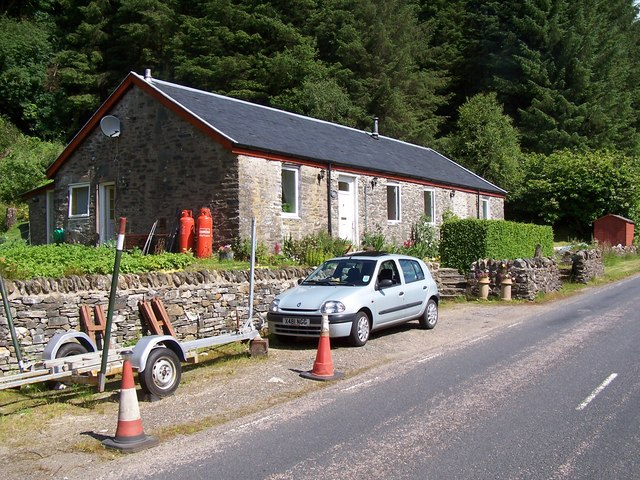
Dunans Cottage

Leading to the castle is Dunans Bridge, an A-listed structure, designed by Thomas Telford in 1815 and constructed to commemorate the battle of Waterloo by John Fletcher.

Once part of the Dunans estate, but still in the ownership of the Fletchers is the Fletcher of Dunans Mausoleum, a grade C listed structure located in the gardens of the neighbouring Stronardron house.

Further buildings once part of the estate but now privately owned include Dunans Lodge, the original gate house to the estate and Dunans Cottage, two workers' cottages combined into one dwelling.

== Scottish Laird fundraiser ==
The current owners operate a scheme whereby individuals can be given or can purchase "Laird or Lady packages" which entitle them to "own" a square foot of land in the grounds of Dunans Castle in Scotland and use the decorative title "Laird of Dunans" or "Lady of Dunans". The profits from the sale of these packages are used to restore this private property.

The Court of the Lord Lyon states that “ownership of a souvenir plot of land is not sufficient to bring a person otherwise ineligible within the jurisdiction of the Lord Lyon for seeking a coat of arms”, and indicated that if these souvenir plots were being purchased for this purpose then they were as good as meaningless. The Scottish Land Register also does not recognise individual ownership of such small plots, meaning purchase of these titles holds no legal entitlement to ownership of the land nor use of it: they are simply decorative.

== Owners ==
Name(s)	Ownership period	Notes	Sources
Archibald Fletcher, 9th Chief	Around 1745–1763	Recorded as resident in 1745, though the date of arrival could be any time between 1715 and 1745.	
Angus Fletcher, 10th Chief	1763–1807		
John Fletcher, 11th Chief	1807–1822	Commissioned the bridge from Thomas Telford	
Angus Fletcher, 12th Chief	1822–1875	Commissioned the Gothic elaboration from Andrew Kerr	
Harriet Fletcher; Bernard James Cuddon-Fletcher	1875–1889	Cuddon took his wife's name, as did their children, keeping the estate in the Fletcher name	
Bernard James Cuddon-Fletcher	1889–1934	Cuddon-Fletcher kept the estate in his own right between his wife's death and his own demise.	
Andrew William Fletcher; Ian Archibald Fletcher	1934	Shared between the previous owners' 3rd and 4th sons	
Ian Archibald Fletcher	1934–1962	Bought out his brother after the estate was left to them both.	
Colonel Archibald Ian Douglas "Archie" Fletcher	1962-1997	Upon his death his heirs sold the castle out of the Fletcher line.	
Jonathan Irving Hyslop; Pranee Hyslop	1997–1999		
Robert David Lucas-Gardiner; Ewa Jheresa Lucas-Gardiner	1999–2003		
Charles Selwyn Dixon-Spain; Sadie Michaela Dixon-Spain	2003–	Bought the ruin for £230,000	

== Gallery ==
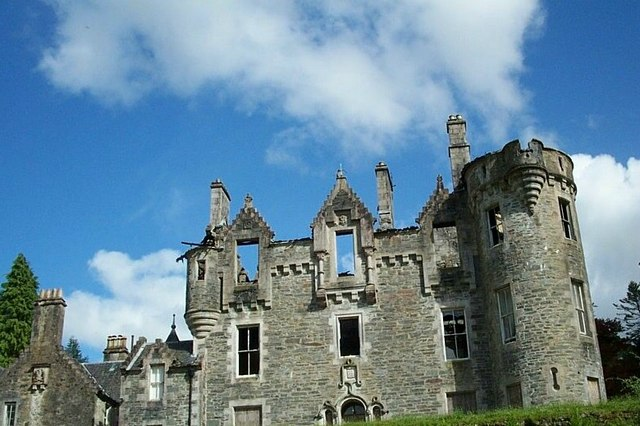

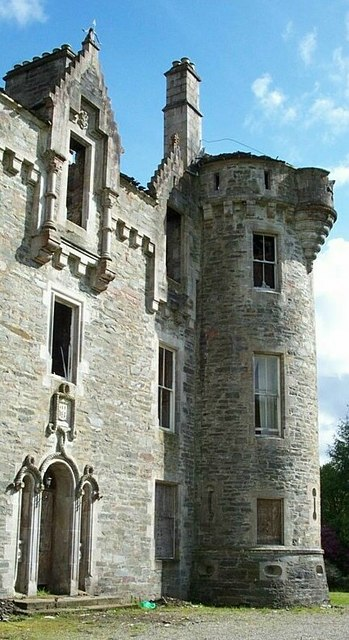
