= Glen Lean =

Valley in Argyll and Bute, Scotland

- Glen
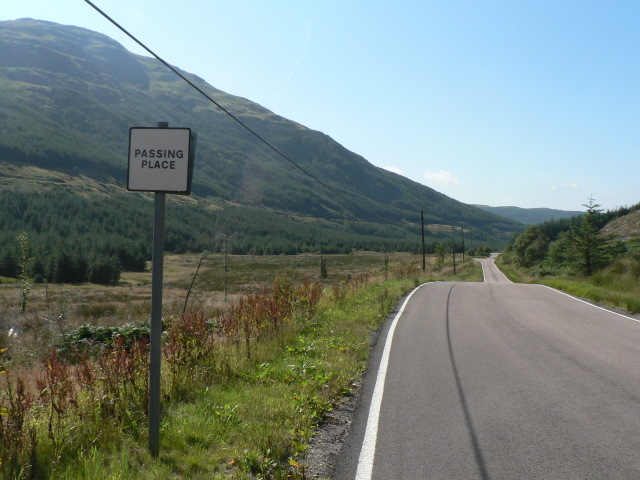
- Glen Lean and the B836

- Location within Scotland
- Coordinates: 56.006736°N 5.0693618°W
- Grid position: NS 08731 83563
- Location: Cowal, Argyll and Bute, Scotland.

Glen Lean is a glen in Argyll and Bute, west of Scotland. It is a glacial-formed glen, with near vertical sides along part of the landform. It runs from the head of the Holy Loch in the east to the head of Loch Striven in the west. The only hamlet in the glen is Clachaig. The Little Eachaig River flows out of the glen, joining the River Eachaig and flows into the Holy Loch. The Tarsan Dam is the other notable feature in the glen.

There is also the buildings at risk (unlisted) ruins of a powder mill, built c. 1840, in Clachaig.

The B836, a single-track road, goes through the glen. It is part of the 478 Dunoon–Portavadie bus route.
