= Through street =

Type of street or road

A through street or through road can be one of two types of street or road:

- A street or road on which the through movement of traffic is given preference, meaning it has the right of way in intersections and thus can move without interruptions.
- A road or street which has junctions with other roads at both ends, as in the opposite of a no through road.
