= Ardtaraig =

Coordinates: 55.997656°N 5.1147546°W

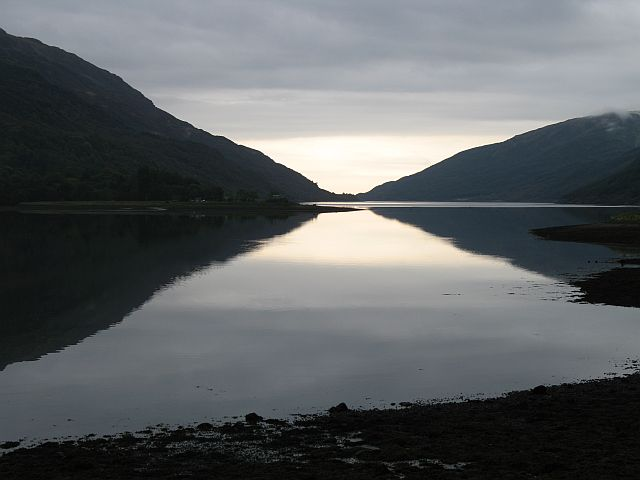
- Loch Striven - geograph.org.uk - 572652

- Location within Argyll and Bute
- OS grid reference: NS 05856 82680
- Council area: Argyll and Bute
- Lieutenancy area: Argyll and Bute
- Country: Scotland
- Sovereign state: United Kingdom
- Post town: DUNOON, ARGYLL
- Postcode district: PA23
- Dialling code: 01369
- UK Parliament: Argyll, Bute and South Lochaber
- Scottish Parliament: Argyll and Bute

Ardtaraig is a hamlet lying at the head of Loch Striven on the Cowal Peninsula, in Argyll and Bute, West of Scotland. The hamlet is on the single track B836 road.

== Cowal Hydro Scheme ==
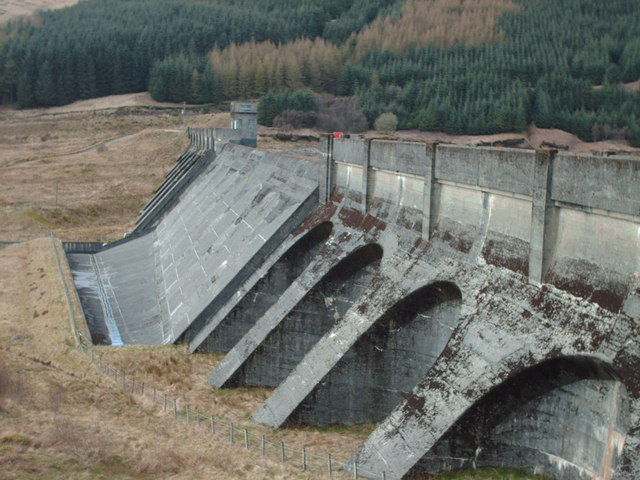
Tarsan Dam

The Cowal Hydro Scheme is part of the Sloy/Awe Hydro-Electric Scheme and produces 8MW from the stored waters of Loch Tarsan (artificial reservoir), located close by in Glen Lean. The generating house is located at Ardtaraig and is supplied by pipe. The scheme opened in 1951.

== History ==
=== Ardtaraig Chapel ===
Ardtaraig Chapel no longer stands, but the foundations are still visible.

=== World War II ===
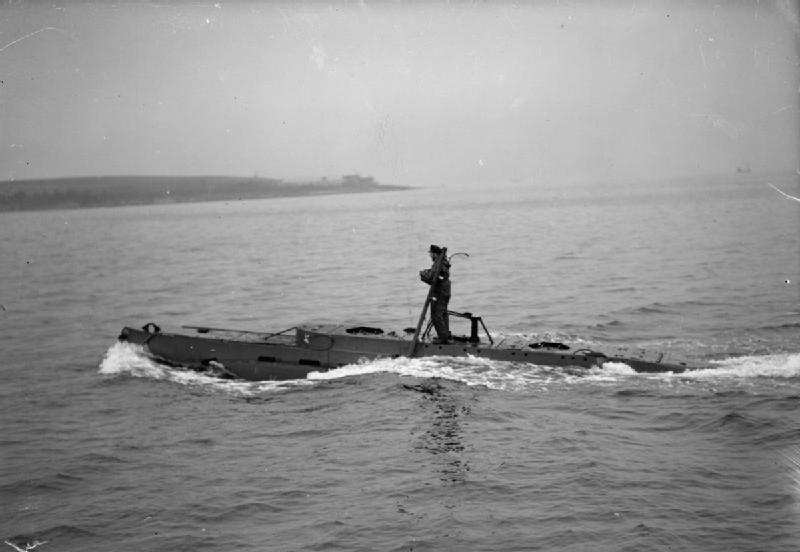
The Royal Navy during the Second World Wat A22903

Ardtaraig was known as HMS Varbel II, a secondary base to HMS Varbel, where navigation was taught to the men who manned the midget submarines or X-craft.

== Transportation ==
=== National Cycle Route 75 ===
Ardtaraig is on the NCR75 a route from Edinburgh to Tarbert on the Kintyre peninsula. The National Cycle Network is maintained by sustrans.

=== Bus ===
The hamlet is served by the 478 Dunoon–Portavadie bus, operated by West Coast Motors.
