= Cowal =

Peninsula in Argyll and Bute, Scotland

Cowal Comhghall (Scottish Gaelic)
- Peninsula
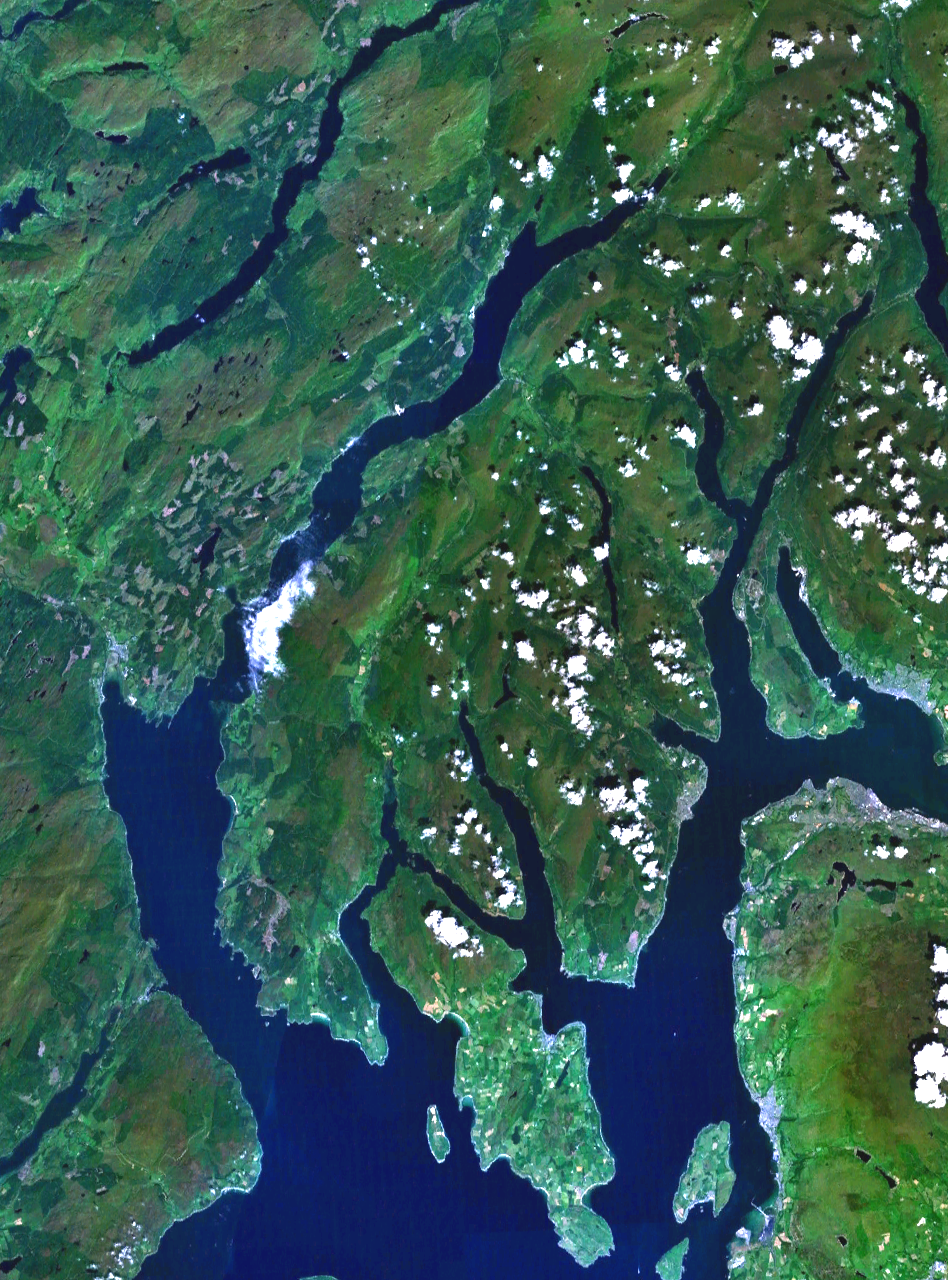
- Cowal, taken by Landsat

- Location within Scotland
- Coordinates: 56°01′N 5°06′W
- Grid position: NS 09111 85254
- Location: Argyll and Bute, Scotland
- Highest elevation: 901.7 metres (2,958 ft) (Beinn an Lochain)

Cowal (Scottish Gaelic: Comhghall) is a rugged peninsula in Argyll and Bute, on the west coast of Scotland. It is connected to the mainland to the north, and is bounded by Loch Fyne to the west, by Loch Long and the Firth of Clyde to the east, and by the Kyles of Bute to the south.

Argyll is the historic county that the Cowal peninsula was within. Inveraray was the county town.

The northern part of the peninsula is covered by Argyll Forest Park and also includes the Arrochar Alps. In the south, the peninsula is divided into three forks by Loch Striven and Loch Riddon. Cowal's only burgh is Dunoon in the south-east, from which ferries sail to Gourock in Inverclyde. Other ferries run from Portavadie in the west to Tarbert in Kintyre, and from Colintraive in the south to Rhubodach on Bute.

Much of Cowal was once held by the Lamont clan. Later, the Campbells came to be one of the most powerful families in Cowal.

The highest point on the peninsula is Beinn an Lochain in the Arrochar Alps, a Corbett with a height of 901.7 metres (2,958 ft). The summit overlooks Loch Restil.

== Geography and geology ==
The peninsula is connected to the mainland and bounded to the north by the Arrochar Alps, a group of mountains located around the head of Loch Fyne, Loch Long, and Loch Goil. The Kyles of Bute, a narrow sea channel, separates it from the Isle of Bute to the south, and it borders the Firth of Clyde to the south-east. Several deeply incised sea lochs form a major factor in its geography, with Loch Fyne providing its western boundary, Loch Long providing its north-eastern boundary, and Loch Goil, the Holy Loch, Loch Striven and Loch Riddon cutting into the peninsula and dividing it into several forks.

At its longest, from the Rest and be Thankful pass to Ardlamont Point, the peninsula is some 32 miles (51 km) long. At its broadest, from Dunoon to Otter Ferry, it is some 17 miles (27 km) wide. Its highest point, on Beinn Ìme in the Arrochar Alps, is 1,012.2 metres (3,321 ft) above sea level.

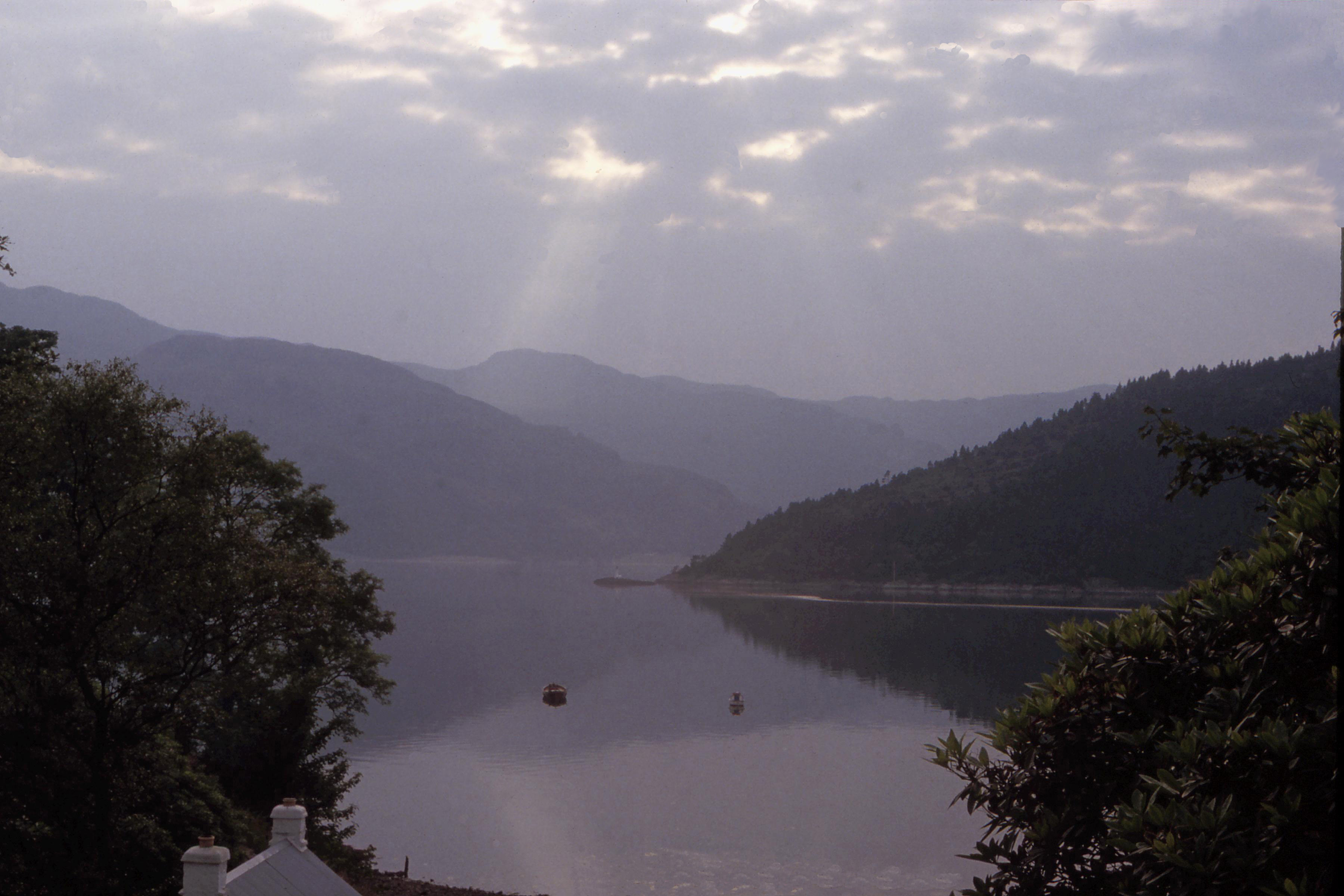
View of northern Cowal from the far side of Loch Long, showing the mouth of Loch Goil

Cowal's underlying geology is made up largely of resistant metamorphic rocks, but south of the Highland Boundary Fault part of the Toward peninsula is composed of sedimentary rocks. The landscape is mountainous, the high ground dominated by moorland, peat mosses and the forest that often extends down the sides of the sea lochs to the water's edge. The acreage of improved farmland is small. Most land is owned by estates or the Forestry and Land Scotland except in the more settled areas.

The coast is mostly rocky and the few beaches are mostly shingle and gravel, with the principal exceptions of Ostel Bay on Loch Fyne in the far south-west of Cowal, and Ardentinny on Loch Long in the east, where sandy beaches are to be found. The only lowland areas are around the coast where most of the settlement is found, particularly around Cowal's largest settlement, Dunoon, on the Firth of Clyde.

Settlements in Cowal include:

- Ardentinny
- Ardgartan
- Ardnadam
- Ardtaraig
- Arrochar
- Blairmore
- Cairndow
- Carrick Castle
- Clachaig
- Clachan of Glendaruel
- Colintraive
- Coylet
- Dunoon
- Glenbranter
- Hunters Quay
- Innellan
- Inverchaolain
- Kames
- Kilfinan
- Kilmun
- Kirn
- Lochgoilhead
- Millhouse
- Otter Ferry
- Portavadie
- Rashfield
- Sandbank
- St Catherines
- Strachur
- Strone
- Succoth
- Tighnabruaich
- Toward
- Whistlefield

== Natural heritage ==
There are significant areas of remnant Atlantic rainforest on the peninsula and Argyll Countryside Trust (ACT) has established the West Cowal Habitat Restoration Project to promote its sustainable management and expansion. Reducing the number of deer is an important part of this work and the community is pursuing the establishment of a venison larder and butchery at Glendaruel.

== History ==
Evidence of early occupation of the area is in the form of cairns or burial mounds. One example is a Bronze Age cairn from between about 2000 BC and 800 BC is situated close to the summit of Creag Evanachan, 195 metres (640 ft) above sea level overlooking Loch Fyne. It is a mound of stones about 20 metres (66 ft) in diameter and up to 2 metres (6.6 ft) high. Another is the cairn at Dunchraigaig which is 195 feet (59 m) in diameter and was first excavated in 1864. At the south end a cist contained the deposits of burnt bones from eight or ten bodies. A smaller cist in the centre contained a bowl, burnt bone, charcoal and flint chips, and in the clay below them, the remains of a burial. A third even smaller cist also contained a food bowl, burnt bones and flint chips. A whetstone, flint knife, fragments of pottery and a greenstone axe were also found.

=== Argyll ===
When the Irish invaded the region, it became part of their kingdom of Dal Riata. The Cenél Comgaill, a kin group within Dal Riata, controlled the Cowal peninsula, which consequently took their name (evolving over time from Comgaill to Cowal). Prior to this, little is known, except as revealed archaeologically, though the region may have been part of the Pictish kingdom of Fortriu.

Following a subsequent invasion by Norsemen, the Hebridean islands of Dal Riata became the Kingdom of the Isles, which following Norwegian unification became part of Norway, as Suðreyjar (historically anglicised as Sodor). The remaining parts of Dal Riata attracted the name Argyll, in reference to their ethnicity. In an unclear manner, the kingdom of Alba was founded elsewhere by groups originating from Argyll.

However, an 11th-century Norse military campaign led to the formal transfer of Lorn, Islay, Kintyre, Knapdale, Bute, and Arran, to Suðreyjar. This left Alba with no part of Argyll except Cowal, and the land between Loch Awe and Loch Fyne. After Alba united with Moray, over the course of the century, it became Scotland. In 1326, a sheriff was appointed for the Scottish parts of Argyll.

Although, following the Treaty of Perth, Suðreyjar's successor state, the Lordship of the Isles, fell under the nominal authority of the Scottish king, it was not until 1475 that it was merged with Scotland (the occasion being the punishment of its ruler for an anti-Scottish conspiracy). The sheriffdom of Argyll was expanded to include the adjacent mainland areas from the Lordship. Following local government reforms in the 19th century, the traditional provinces were formally abolished, in favour of counties aligned with sheriffdoms, so Cowal became merely a part of the county of Argyll.

=== Clans and castles ===
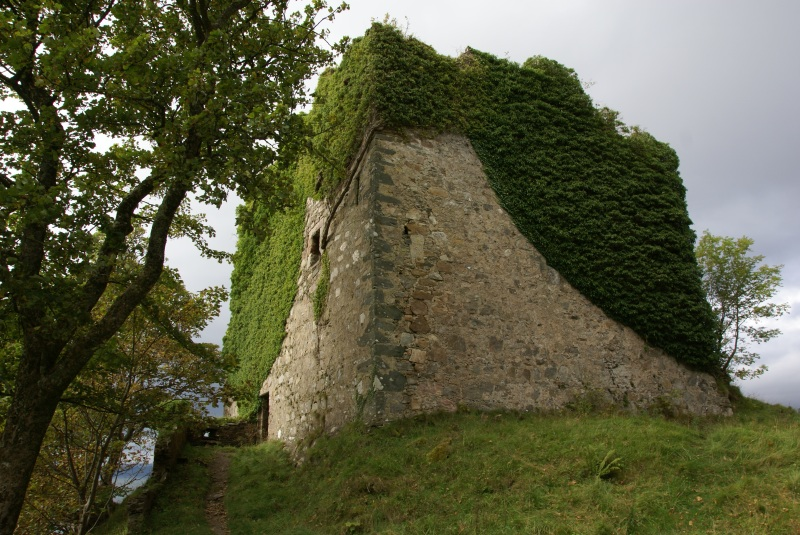
Castle Lachlan

The history of the Cowal is tied into the clans who inhabited it. Seemingly, in the 11th century, an unidentified heiress of the Cenel Comgaill married Anrothan, grandson of the king of the Cenél nEógain, from Ulster. Clan traditions argue that Anrothan's lands were passed down to a descendant named Aodha Alainn O'Neil, who had the following sons:

- Neil, who founded the MacNeil of Argyll, who were castellans of Castle Sween in Knapdale, on behalf of the Lords of the Isles. The MacNeil of Barra claim to be related to them, though how they came to be involved with Barra is unclear.
- Gillachrist, whose son was:
  - Lachlan Mor, who founded Clan MacLachlan, who ruled from Castle Lachlan, on the Loch Fyne coast
- Dunslebhe, whose sons were:
  - Ewen, who founded Clan Ewen of Otter, who ruled from Castle MacEwen, in the Kilfinan peninsula
  - Fearchar, who founded Clan MacKerracher, renamed Clan Lamont after 1235, after Lauman, the then chief. Clan Lamont ruled from Toward Castle, in the Toward peninsula.

Tamhais Mhór, the traditional founder of Clan MacTavish, is said to have taken lands in Cowal during the 12th century, from which he received the appellation "the Great."

Excavations carried out at Castle MacEwen showed the site had several stages of development before it was the defended medieval homestead of the MacEwens; at first there was a palisaded enclosure, and then a promontory fort with a timber rampart.

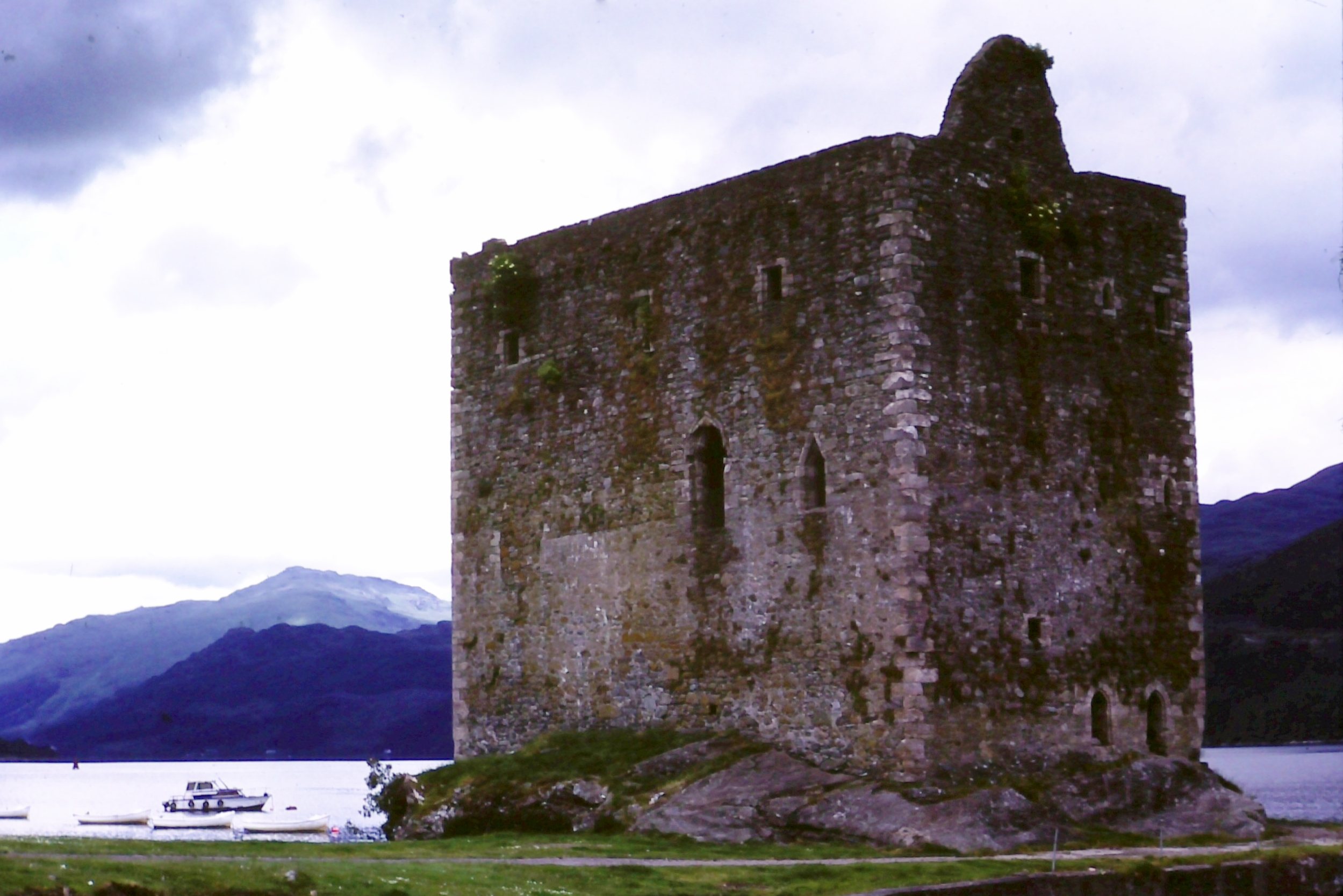
Carrick Castle

The remote areas in the north east of Cowal, which were theoretically under the dominion of Clan Lamont, were used by Scottish kings for hunting; indeed, Cowal was the last part of Britain to have wild boar. When King John Balliol was threatened by his rival, Robert de Bruys, Balliol's ally, the king of England, established Henry Percy at Carrick Castle, in the region; likewise Dunoon Castle further south. De Bruys expelled the English from Cowal, with the aid of the Campbells (who were based nearby at Loch Awe), and eventually defeated Balliol. De Bruy's son gave Carrick Castle to the Campbells, while, after spending some time as a direct Royal possession, Dunoon Castle was handed to them by James III, who made the Campbells its Honorary Keepers.

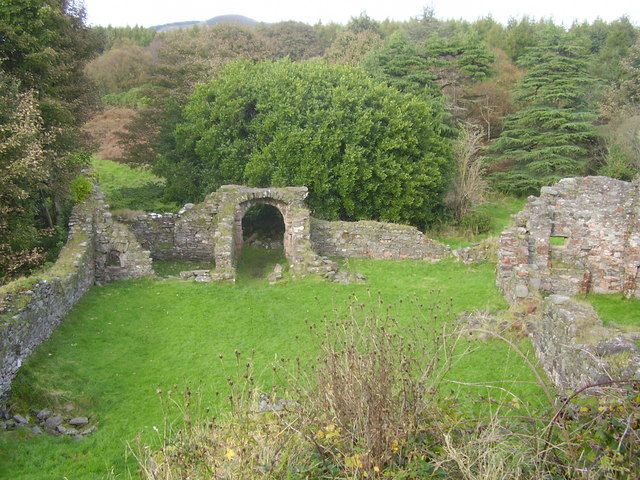
The remains of Toward Castle

During the civil war between Royalists and Puritans, the Campbells had sided with the Puritans, so following their defeat at the Battle of Inverlochy, Clan Lamont took the opportunity to push back the borders of Campbell control. Predictably, in 1646, the Campbells took revenge, and overran Toward Castle; after being offered hospitability, the Campbells slaughtered the Lamont occupants in their beds. Despite the chief of the Lamonts surrendering, the Campbells hanged many members of Clan Lamont, in what became known as the Dunoon massacre.

By contrast, the next chief of the Campbells, the son of the former chief, was a Royalist, so after the restoration of Royalist rule, the Campbells were not ultimately dispossessed of their gains. However, after James VII came to the Scottish throne, the Campbells revolted, and the chief was executed, but his son, the new chief, took part in the successful expulsion of James VII, so the Campbells once again ultimately retained their lands.

=== 18th century ===
After the Jacobite rising of 1715 when James Francis Edward Stuart attempted to regain the throne, the lack of roads in the Highlands prevented the British army from advancing to quell areas of unrest. General Wade was tasked with implementing a programme to build military roads from north-central Scotland through the Highlands to the forts in the Great Glen. They were constructed by officers and soldiers. William Caulfeild succeeded Wade in 1740 and constructed the road from Dumbarton via Tarbet to Inveraray through the Cowal where it is known as the "Rest and Be Thankful".

=== 19th century ===
In Victorian times tourism began to take hold on the Clyde coast. Steam propulsion started in 1812 and by the end of the 19th century, paddle steamers ferried thousands of Glaswegians doon the watter from Broomielaw in the city centre to holiday resorts including Dunoon on the Cowal.

== Transport ==
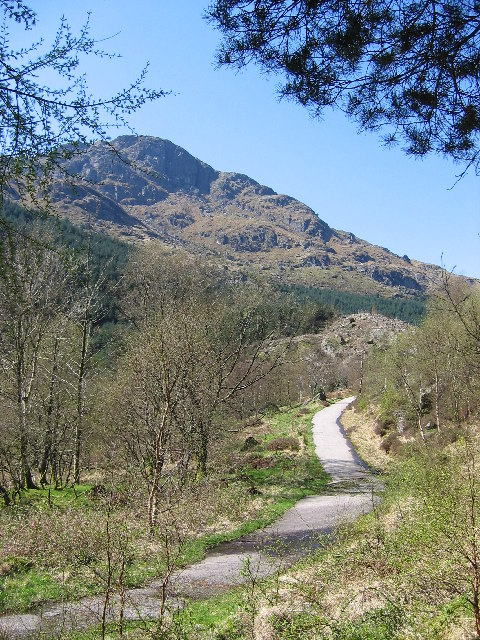
Military road leading to Rest and Be Thankful

The principal forms of transport in Cowal are by road and by ferry, and the peninsula is crossed by a cycle route that makes use of both. Railways have never penetrated the area.

=== Roads ===
The A83 trunk road crosses the northern end of the peninsular passing Arrochar at the head of Loch Long and Cairndow near the head of Loch Fyne. It partly follows or runs parallel to William Caulfeild's historic military road that takes its name, Rest and Be Thankful from the stone seat erected at the summit at the head of Glen Croe. As the A83 has been subject to landslips, the old route has been used as a diversionary route. The other A roads are the A815 which links the A83 with Dunoon via Strachur where the A886 leaves it and heads south via Glendaruel to Colintraive where the ferry connects it to the Isle of Bute and the A8003 which links Tighnabruaich to the A886. Other roads are secondary B roads, narrow roads or tracks.

=== Ferries ===
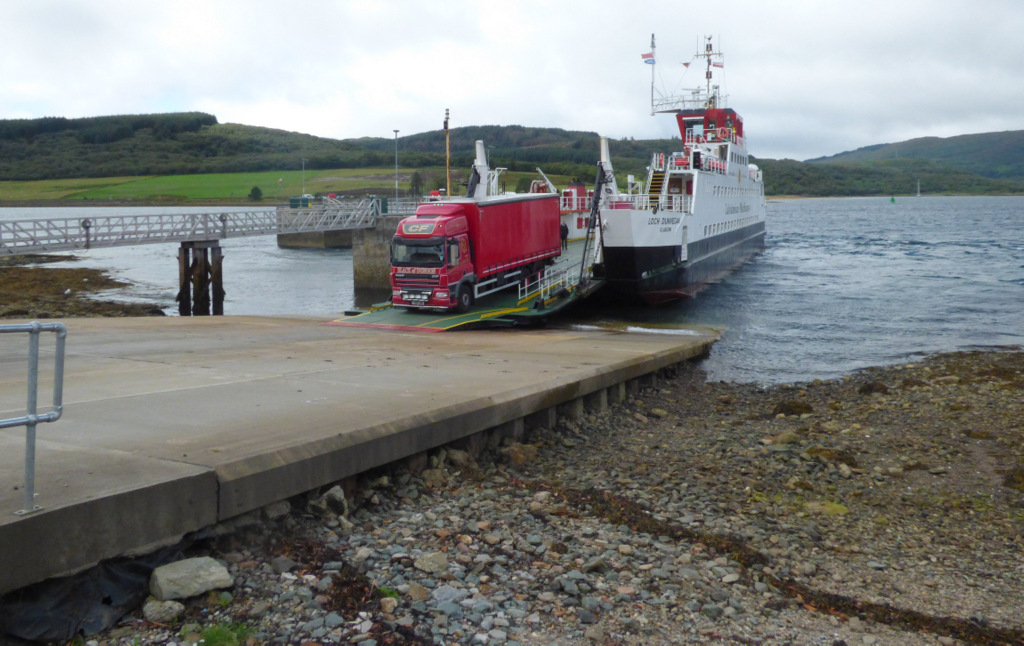
Ferry across the Kyles of Bute at Colintraive

Because of the incised nature of the coastline around Cowal, ferries play a large part in the transport of the area. The shortest and fastest routes from much of Cowal to the population centres of the Scottish central belt involve crossing the Firth of Clyde. A passenger-only service operated by Caledonian MacBrayne connects Dunoon to Gourock in Inverclyde where there is easy access the ScotRail train service to Glasgow Central railway station. Western Ferries operates a high-frequency vehicle carrying service between Hunters Quay, near Dunoon, and McInroy's Point, on the outskirts of Gourock in Inverclyde.

Further south and west, Caledonian MacBrayne vehicle ferries provide crossings both to the Isle of Bute and to Kintyre. It takes five minutes to cross the 400-yard (370-metre) strait from Colintraive on Cowal to Rhubodach on Bute. The ferry from Portavadie on Cowal to Tarbert on Kintyre across Loch Fyne takes 25 minutes.

=== Cycling ===
The National Cycle Route 75 (NCR75) links Dunoon and Portavadie on Cowal, as part of a through route between Edinburgh and Tarbert on the Kintyre peninsula. The route forms part of the National Cycle Network, maintained by Sustrans.

From east to west across Cowal, the route starts with a ferry crossing from Gourock to Dunoon. It then follows the Cowal coast north, passing the Holy Loch and Sandbank, before travelling through Glen Lean to the head of Loch Striven at Ardtaraig. From the head of Loch Striven it crosses to the head of Loch Riddon at the Clachan of Glendaruel. It then passes down the west coast of Loch Riddon to Tighnabruaich on the shore of the Kyles of Bute. From here it crosses inland to Portavadie, where another ferry takes it to Tarbert on Kintyre. At Tarbert the NCR75 connects with the NCR78 from Campbeltown to Inverness.

== Sport and culture ==
The Loch Lomond and Cowal Way stretches for over 57 miles (92 kilometres) through Cowal, from Portavadie on the southeastern shore of Loch Fyne leading to Inveruglas on Loch Lomond, in the Loch Lomond and The Trossachs National Park.

The Cowal Highland Gathering, the annual highland games, are held annually in Dunoon stadium on the last Friday/Saturday of August.

== Sights ==
=== Castles ===
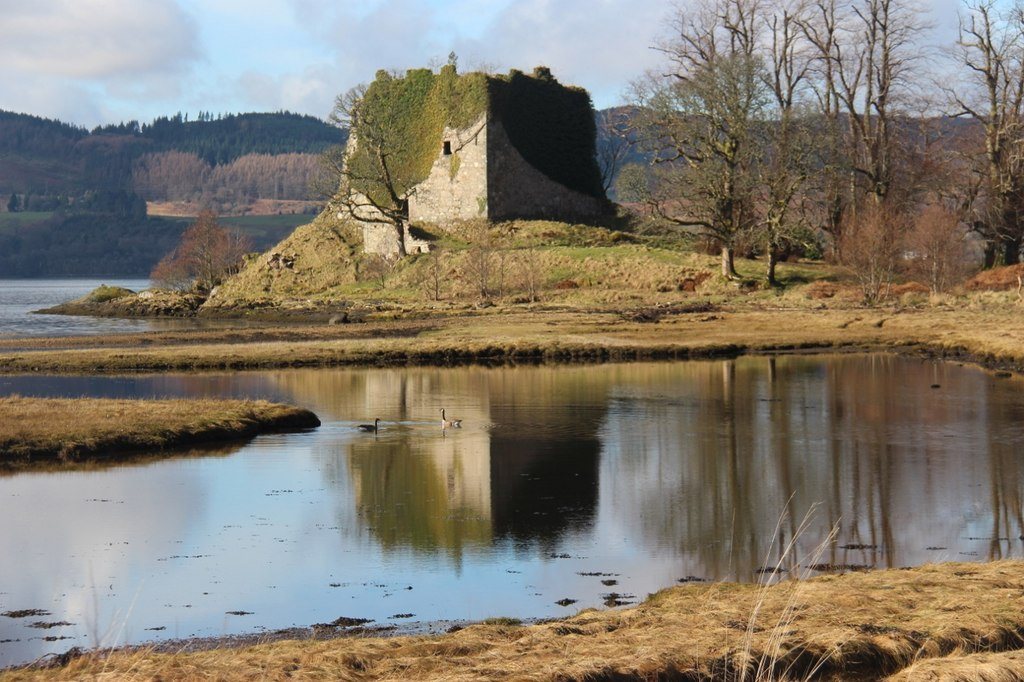
Old Castle Lachlan

- Ardkinglas Castle, no longer standing. Near Cairndow.
- Asgog Castle, ruin, next to Asgog Loch, Millhouse, Kilfinan Parish.
- Auchenbreck Castle (no longer standing), Kilmodan, Glendaruel
- Carrick Castle (private), Carrick Castle
- Dunans Castle (ruin, fire damage), Glendaruel
- Dunoon Castle (no longer standing), Dunoon
- Knockamillie Castle, ruin, Innellan
- New Castle Lachlan (private), Strathlachlan
- Old Castle Lachlan (ruin), Strathlachlan
- Castle MacEwen (no longer standing), Kilfinan
- Castle Toward (private), Toward
- Toward Castle (ruin), in the grounds of Castle Toward

=== Country estates ===
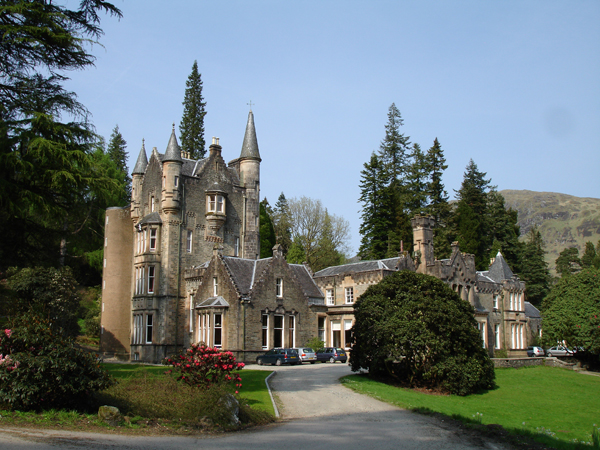
Benmore House

- Ardkinglas Estate, Cairndow
- Ardlamont Estate, Ardlamont peninsula.
- Benmore Estate
- Glendaruel Estate, Glendaruel
- Glenbranter Estate, Glenbranter
- Glenfinart Estate, Ardentinny, Glen Finart
- Knockdow Estate (formerly known as the estate of Kilmichael), Toward

== See also ==
- Cowal Community Hospital
- National parks of Scotland
- List of places in Argyll and Bute
