= Loch Striven =

- Loch Sroigheann (Scottish Gaelic)
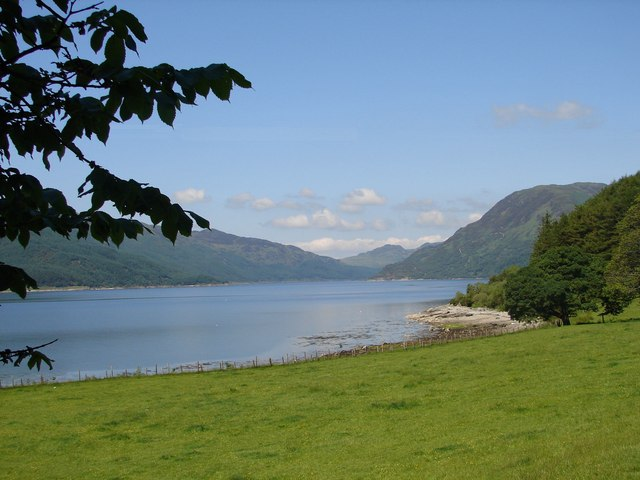
- Loch Striven at Inverchaolain

- Location within Argyll and Bute
- Location: Cowal, Argyll and Bute, Scotland
- Coordinates: 55.928753°N 5.0707625°W, grid reference NS0825874892
- Type: Sea loch
- Basin countries: Scotland, United Kingdom.
- Max. length: 12 km (7.5 mi)
- Surface elevation: Sea Level
- Frozen: No

Loch Striven (Scottish Gaelic: Loch Sroigheann) is a sea loch in Argyll and Bute, Scotland. The loch forms a narrow inlet about 8 miles (13 km) long extending north into the Cowal Peninsula. It meets the Firth of Clyde and the Kyles of Bute between Strone Point and Ardyne Point, just north of the Isle of Bute.

The hamlet of Ardtaraig lies at the head of the loch, on the B836 road that provides an east-west route across Cowal between the heads of the Holy Loch and Loch Riddon. Minor roads follow the coast of the loch from its southern end, with the one on the east coast terminating near the hamlet of Inverchaolain about the mid-point of the loch, and the one on the west coast petering out after just 1.5 miles (2.4 km). There is no road access to the north of the loch between these points and Ardtaraig.

== Maritime usage ==
The deep water and secluded nature of Loch Striven has made it suitable for a number of different forms of maritime usage, both naval and civilian, over the years.

=== World War II ===
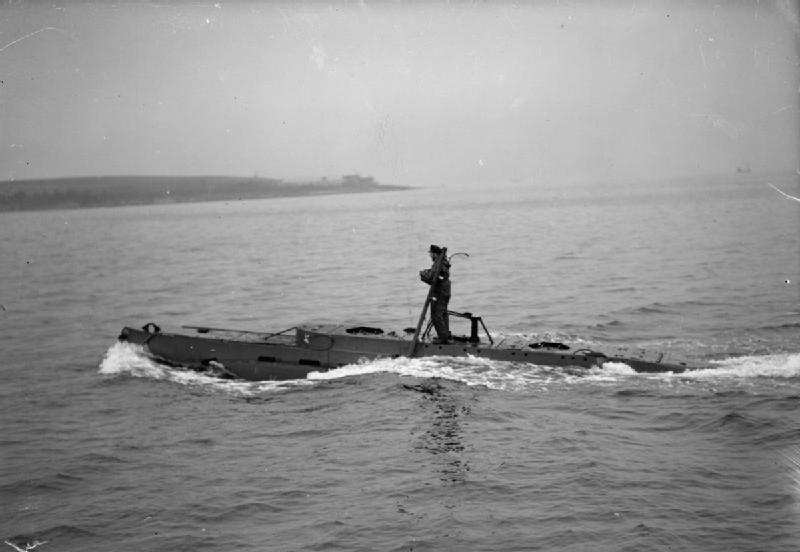
X-Craft 25 underway in Loch Striven

The upper reaches of the sea loch, because of their secluded location, and their topographical similarity to Norwegian fjords, were used extensively for midget submarine (X-craft) training during World War II. The training programme was directed from HMS Varbel in Port Bannatyne to the south in the luxury Kyles Hydro Hotel, overlooking the port, which was requisitioned by the Admiralty to serve as the HQ for midget submarine operations, including the attack on the Tirpitz. Ardtaraig House, located at the head of Loch Striven, and similarly requisitioned by the Admiralty, became a secondary naval base for the 12th Submarine Flotilla midget submarines and became known as HMS Varbel II.

The loch was also used as the main trials area for "Highball" (see picture), the smaller anti-ship version of "Upkeep", the "bouncing bomb" used by The Dambusters. Over 100 dummy bombs were dropped in the loch between Spring 1943 and Autumn 1944, using (at first) a Wellington but mainly Mosquitoes based at RAF Turnberry. Two of these bombs were recovered in 2017; one is now at Brooklands Museum and the other at the de Havilland Aircraft Museum. Between 15 and 17 May 1944, HMS Malaya was used in Loch Striven as a target ship for inert Highball bouncing bomb prototypes, one of which punched a hole in the ship's side.

=== Oil fuel depot ===
Since the 1960s, the Loch Striven Oil Fuel Depot has operated at Knockdow on the east side of the loch, with a fuel jetty and partially underground storage tanks. Operated by the Oil and Pipelines Agency, it receives diesel and aviation fuel by coastal tanker, and provides supplies to Royal Navy and other NATO vessels. The jetty at the depot is also designated as a Z-Berth, meaning it is suitable for occasional visits by nuclear-powered warships.

=== Oil rig construction ===
An oil rig construction yard operated at Ardyne Point on the east shore of the loch from 1974 to 1978. Run by Sir Robert McAlpine, it constructed three concrete gravity platforms for use in the North Sea. The largest of these was the Cormorant Alpha platform for the Cormorant oilfield situated some 100 miles (160 km) north-east of Shetland, where it is still in use.

=== Laid up ships ===
During times of recession in shipping, the sea loch has been used as a sheltered anchorage for laid-up vessels. The (then) newly built LNG carriers Gastor and Nestor were laid up here from delivery from the shipyard Chantiers de l'Atlantique in 1976 until being sold 15 years later to Bonny Gas Transport in 1992. The Danish shipping company Maersk used the sea loch for cold layup of some of its vessels (namely four of the B- class vessels in its fleet and Sealand Performance) from 2009 to 2010.

== Hydro-electric generating station ==
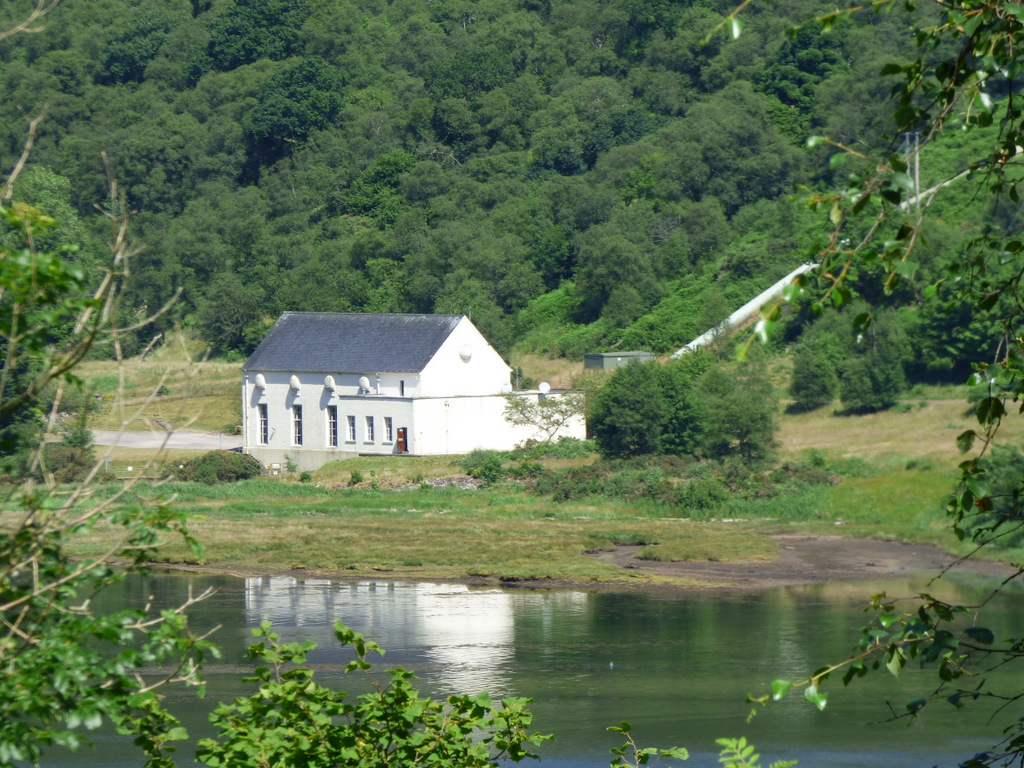
Hydro-electric generating station

The hydro-electric generating station for the Striven Hydro-Electric Scheme is located at the head of Loch Striven at Ardtaraig. The building was designed to blend-in with the local architecture and appears to resemble a large house or small church when viewed from a distance Opened in 1951, its single turbine has a generating capacity of 8 megawatts (11,000 hp).
