= List of bays of Scotland =

The following is a list of bays in Scotland.

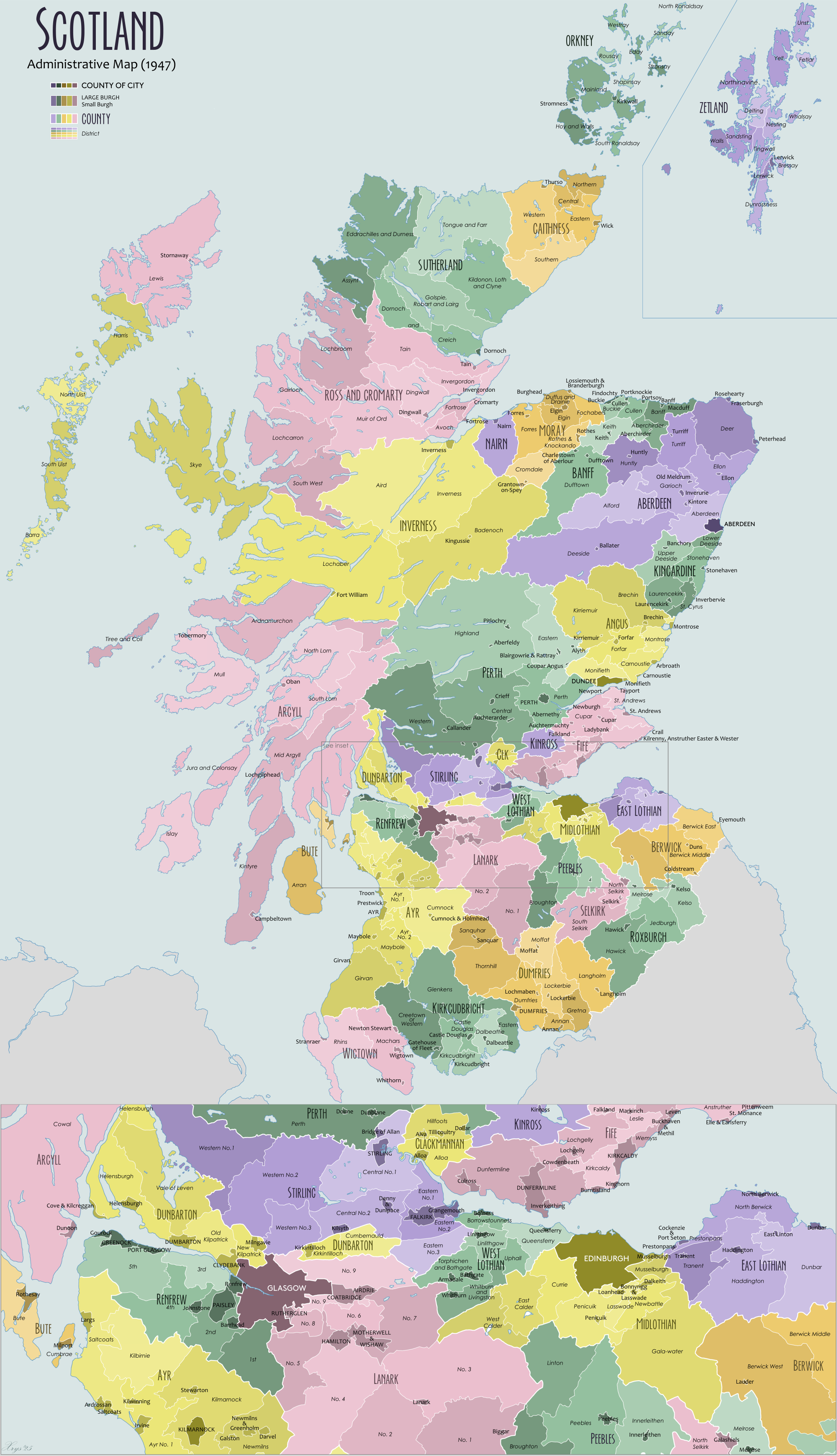
Map of Scottish administrative counties

== A ==
Name	County	Nearest Town or Village	Coordinates	Image	Notes
Aberdour Bay	Aberdeenshire	Rosehearty	57°40′38″N 2°11′22″W		
Aberlady Bay	East Lothian	Aberlady	56°00′46″N 2°52′46″W		
Achagoyle Bay	Argyll	Minard	56°06′54″N 5°15′06″W		
Achanarnich Bay	Argyll	Ardfern	56°09′31″N 5°35′58″W		
Achadh-Chaorann Bay	Argyll	West Loch Tarbert	55°46′39″N 5°34′29″W		
Achnacree Bay	Argyll	Connel	56°28′08″N 5°21′35″W		
Achnahaird Bay	Ross and Cromarty	Altandhu	58°04′17″N 5°21′37″W		
Achmelvich Bay	Sutherland	Lochinver	58°10′26″N 5°18′37″W		
Airds Bay	Argyll	Appin	56°32′48″N 5°24′51″W		
Alness Bay	Ross and Cromarty	Alness	57°40′25″N 4°16′50″W		
An Acairseid	Ross and Cromarty	Blarnalearoch	57°52′25″N 5°07′30″W		
An Camas Aiseig	Argyll	Corran	56°43′41″N 5°15′01″W		
Annat Bay	Ross and Cromarty	Ullapool	57°55′21″N 5°19′27″W		
Am Broilein	Argyll	Corran	56°37′53″N 5°26′48″W		
Applecross Bay	Ross and Cromarty	Applecross	57°26′08″N 5°49′23″W		
Ardentallen Bay	Argyll	Oban	56°21′27″N 5°29′54″W		
Ardinamir Bay	Argyll	Balvicar	56°14′56″N 5°37′16″W		
Ardintoul Bay	Ross and Cromarty	Glenelg	57°15′27″N 5°35′06″W		
Ardlamont Bay	Argyll	Kames	55°50′10″N 5°13′54″W		
Ardmaddy Bay	Argyll	Balvicar	56°16′56″N 5°35′06″W		
Ardmaddy Bay	Argyll	Taynuilt	56°29′42″N 5°07′32″W		
Ardmarnock Bay	Argyll	Kames	55°54′15″N 5°20′56″W		
Ardmucknish Bay	Argyll	Benderloch	56°28′52″N 5°25′31″W		
Ardnacross Bay	Argyll	Campbeltown	55°27′57″N 5°31′58″W		
Ardneil Bay	Ayrshire	West Kilbride	55°41′38″N 4°53′26″W		
Ardintigh Bay	Inverness-shire	Morar	56°58′36″N 5°39′40″W		
Ardtornish Bay	Argyll	Lochaline	56°31′17″N 5°44′39″W		
Ardwell Bay	Ayrshire	Girvan	55°12′27″N 4°53′39″W		
Ardwell Bay	Dumfries and Galloway	Ardwell	54°45′50″N 5°00′00″W		
Armadale Bay	Sutherland	Armadale,	58°33′28″N 4°04′42″W		
Arnot Boo	Aberdeenshire	Portlethen	57°03′53″N 2°06′05″W		
Ascog Bay	Bute	Rothesay	55°49′37″N 5°01′24″W		
Asgog Bay	Argyll	Kames	55°51′09″N 5°17′41″W		
Asknish Bay	Argyll	Arduaine	56°13′56″N 5°33′27″W		
Auchalick Bay	Argyll	Kames	55°55′11″N 5°20′37″W		
Auchencairn Bay	Dumfries and Galloway	Auchencairn	54°50′15″N 3°49′49″W		
Auchenmalg Bay	Dumfries and Galloway	Auchenmalg	54°49′43″N 4°45′05″W		
Avoch Bay	Ross and Cromarty	Avoch	57°33′50″N 4°09′46″W		

== B ==
Name	County	Nearest Town or Village	Coordinates	Image	Notes
Badcall Bay	Sutherland	Badcall	58°19′20″N 5°08′37″W		
Badentarbat Bay	Ross and Cromarty	Achiltibuie	58°01′10″N 5°22′24″W		
Bàgh a' Chnoic Ghairbh	Sutherland		58°24′26″N 5°05′14″W		
Bàgh a' Phòllain	Sutherland	Blairmore	58°28′51″N 5°06′23″W		
Bàgh Achadh dà Mhaoilein	Argyllshire	Achahoish	55°53′38″N 5°37′17″W		
Bàgh an Annaite	Sutherland		58°24′39″N 5°03′58″W		
Bàgh an Eilein Duibh	Sutherland		58°24′56″N 5°06′21″W		
Bàgh an Tailleir	Argyllshire	Ardrishaig	55°58′09″N 5°26′44″W		
Bàgh an Tigh-Stoir	Argyllshire	Arduaine	56°12′18″N 5°33′32″W		
Bàgh an t-Srathain	Sutherland	Lochinver	58°08′21″N 5°15′42″W		
Bàgh Bàn	Argyllshire	Arden	56°10′09″N 5°35′11″W		
Bàgh Buic	Argyllshire	Portavadie	55°53′12″N 5°20′19″W		
Bàgh an t-Strathaidh	Ross and Cromarty	Plockton	57°19′35″N 5°40′29″W		
Bàgh Dail nan Ceann	Argyllshire	Ardfern	56°11′01″N 5°34′45″W		
Bàgh Dalach Duibhe	Argyllshire	Achahoish	55°55′45″N 5°36′10″W		
Bàgh Dùn Mhuilig	Argyllshire	Ardfern	56°09′22″N 5°34′41″W		
Bàgh Glac Cùl a' Gheodha	Sutherland		58°25′22″N 5°05′40″W		
Bàgh Glac na Stàirne	Sutherland		58°25′11″N 5°04′52″W		
Bàgh Leathad na Seamraig	Sutherland		58°23′28″N 5°02′20″W		
Bàgh Leathann	Sutherland		58°17′50″N 5°08′28″W		
Bàgh Loch Sian	Sutherland	Durness	58°31′30″N 4°40′07″W		
Bàgh na Cairidh	Sutherland		58°23′39″N 5°04′37″W		
Bàgh na Cille	Argyllshire	Ardfern	56°08′31″N 5°35′25″W		
Bàgh na Dalach Dubh-Chlachaich	Argyllshire	Kilmelford	56°15′38″N 5°31′26″W		
Bàgh na Fionndalach Mòire	Sutherland		58°23′32″N 5°05′12″W		
Bàgh na h Airde Beg	Sutherland		58°24′12″N 5°03′29″W		
Bàgh na Claise Luachraich	Sutherland		58°23′39″N 5°02′42″W		
Bàgh na Doide	Argyllshire	Achnamara	55°55′20″N 5°41′00″W		
Bàgh Lochan Bad Mhic Iomhair	Sutherland		58°24′59″N 5°05′39″W		
Bàgh Lochan na Sàile	Sutherland		58°25′25″N 5°06′23″W		
Bàgh Lochan nam Ban	Sutherland		58°25′16″N 5°05′30″W		
Bàgh Osde	Argyllshire	Millhouse	55°50′46″N 5°15′45″W		
Bàgh na Sgeire Faide	Sutherland	Rhiconich	58°23′46″N 5°03′25″W		
Bàgh nan Cleathan	Sutherland	Rhiconich	58°24′36″N 5°06′02″W		
Bàgh Poll a' Bhacain	Sutherland	Rhiconich	58°25′53″N 5°06′39″W		
Bàgh Sheigra	Sutherland	Kinlochbervie	58°29′16″N 5°07′23″W		
Bàgh Taigh an Droighinn	Sutherland	Ardrishaig	55°57′30″N 5°26′15″W		
Bàgh Uamh Dhadhaidh	Sutherland	Durness	58°32′33″N 4°39′14″W		
Balcary Bay	Wigtownshire	Auchencairn	54°49′43″N 3°49′57″W		
Balchladich Bay	Sutherland	Balchladich	58°12′58″N 5°21′57″W		
Ballantrae Bay	Ayrshire	Ballantrae	55°06′26″N 5°00′41″W		
Balmacra Bay	Ross and Cromarty	Balmacara	57°16′56″N 5°38′50″W		
Balnakeil Bay	Sutherland	Durness	58°35′05″N 4°47′42″W		
Balvicar Bay	Argyllshire	Balvicar	56°17′36″N 5°36′07″W		
Banff Bay	Banffshire	Banff	57°40′08″N 2°30′47″W		
Barrisdale Bay	Invernessshire	Arnisdale	57°05′23″N 5°31′38″W		
Barlocco Bay	Wigtownshire	Auchencairn	54°48′07″N 3°52′47″W		
Barnacarry Bay	Argyllshire	Oban	56°20′44″N 5°32′39″W		
Barnhill Bay	Fife	Aberdour	56°02′34″N 3°18′30″W		
Bathinghouse Bay	Kirkcudbrightshire	Kirkcudbright	54°47′35″N 4°03′59″W		
Bervie Bay	Kincardineshire	Inverbervie	56°50′33″N 2°16′11″W		
Bay of Clachtoll	Sutherland	Lochinver	58°11′17″N 5°20′20″W		
Bay of Cruden	Aberdeenshire	Cruden Bay	57°24′10″N 1°51′05″W		
Bay of Cullen	Banffshire	Macduff	57°40′21″N 2°27′45″W		
Bay of Culkein	Sutherland	Culkein	58°14′48″N 5°20′15″W		
Bay of Lochielair	Aberdeenshire	Rosehearty	57°41′47″N 2°07′45″W		
Bay of Keisgaig	Sutherland	Balchrick	58°34′38″N 5°01′10″W		
Bay of Sannick	Caithness	John o' Groats	58°38′46″N 3°02′21″W		
Bay of Stoer	Sutherland	Stoer	58°11′54″N 5°20′46″W		
Bay of Swordly	Sutherland	Bettyhill	58°32′36″N 4°10′34″W		
Belhaven Bay	East Lothian	Dunbar	56°00′10″N 2°32′58″W		
Bellochantuy Bay	Argyllshire	Glenbarr	55°31′47″N 5°42′30″W		
Black Bay	Argyllshire	Campbeltown	55°29′01″N 5°31′05″W		
Back Bay	Wigtownshire	Drummore	54°39′19″N 4°52′58″W		
Back Bay	Wigtownshire	Monreith	54°43′22″N 4°32′15″W		
Blackness Bay	West Lothian	Blackness	56°00′19″N 3°31′20″W		
Blackstone Bay	Argyll and Bute	Furnace	56°08′15″N 5°12′59″W		
Blindman's Bay	Argyllshire	Kames	55°50′53″N 5°12′24″W		
Boyne Bay	Banffshire	Portsoy	57°41′03″N 2°38′10″W		
Boyndie Bay	Banffshire	Banff	57°40′32″N 2°33′03″W		
Braidon Bay	Kincardineshire	Stonehaven	56°53′12″N 2°12′49″W		
Bracken Bay	Ayrshire	Ayr	55°25′47″N 4°43′08″W		
Braefoot Bay	Fife	Dalgety Bay	56°02′17″N 3°18′40″W		
Brainport Bay	Argyll and Bute	Minard	56°06′25″N 5°15′18″W		
Breddock Bay	Wigtownshire	Drummore	54°41′37″N 4°57′49″W		
Brenfield Bay	Argyllshire	Ardrishaig	55°59′12″N 5°26′41″W		
Brighouse Bay	Wigtownshire	Kirkcudbright	54°46′49″N 4°07′39″W		
Broadsea Bay	Wigtownshire	Portpatrick	54°53′30″N 5°09′55″W		
Broad Haven	Aberdeenshire	Collieston	57°21′46″N 1°54′40″W		
Bruce's Haven	Aberdeenshire	Collieston	57°22′21″N 1°53′33″W		
Brunerican Bay	Argyll	Southend	55°18′27″N 5°38′01″W		
Burghead Bay	Moray	Burghead	57°40′56″N 3°32′38″W		

== C ==
Name	County	Nearest Town or Village	Coordinates	Image	Notes
Cairngarroch Bay	Wigtownshire	Drummore	54°41′17″N 4°52′54″W		
Cairnsim Bay	Wigtownshire	Portpatrick	54°48′46″N 5°04′03″W		
Camas á Bhata	Ross and Cromarty	South Erradale	57°40′19″N 5°48′00″W		
Camas a' Chaiginn	Argyllshire	Lochaline	56°36′15″N 5°29′37″W		
Camas a' Chall	Sutherland	Midtown	57°52′06″N 5°41′55″W		
Camas a' Charraig	Ross and Cromarty	Mellon Udrigle	57°54′10″N 5°33′23″W		
Camas à Chlàrsair	Ross and Cromarty	Shieldaig	57°31′49″N 5°37′00″W		
Camas a' Chonnaidh	Ross and Cromarty	Kinlochewe	57°40′58″N 5°28′12″W		
Camas a' Chruthaich	Ross and Cromarty	Kinlochewe	57°52′00″N 5°27′15″W		
Camas a' Chòis	Inverness-shire	Ballachulish	56°41′51″N 5°11′07″W		
Camas a' Chuilinn	Argyllshire	Inchree	56°46′29″N 5°12′09″W		
Camas Allt Eoin Thòmais	Ross and Cromarty	Cove	57°50′36″N 5°41′19″W		
Camas an Albannaich	Argyllshire	Easdale	56°15′56″N 5°37′33″W		
Camas an Daimh	Ross and Cromarty	Ullapool	57°52′42″N 5°07′08″W		
Camas an Daraich	Argyllshire	Morar	56°57′10″N 5°51′09″W		
Camas an Dùin	Sutherland	Hope	58°29′21″N 4°40′02″W		
Camas an Eilean	Ross and Cromarty	Shieldaig	57°33′26″N 5°45′19″W		
Camas an Lèim	Ross and Cromarty	Shieldaig	57°32′11″N 5°38′44″W		
Camas an Lighe	Argyllshire	Acharacle	56°45′08″N 5°54′21″W		
Camas an Lochain	Ross and Cromarty	Mellon Udrigle	57°55′08″N 5°35′23″W		
Camas an Lochain	Ross and Cromarty	Poolewe	57°51′58″N 5°41′11″W		
Camas an t-Salainn	Inverness-shire	Arisaig	56°54′01″N 5°51′11″W		
Camas Airigh Shamhraidh	Argyllshire	Lochaline	56°35′05″N 5°30′57″W		
Camas Bàn	Inverness-shire	Corran	57°07′56″N 5°33′59″W		
Camas Bàn	Ross and Cromarty	Cove	57°51′36″N 5°41′13″W		
Camas Bàs Ban	Argyll and Bute				
Camas Bàn	Argyllshire	Oban	56°25′52″N 5°29′01″W		
Camas Buidhe Eoghainn	Ross and Cromarty	Mellon Udrigle	57°55′08″N 5°35′04″W		
Camas Bruaich Ruaidhe	Argyllshire	Connel	56°27′07″N 5°24′41″W		
Camas Chìl Mhalieu	Ross and Cromarty	Kingairloch	56°38′43″N 5°25′06″W		
Camas Choire Mhuilinn	Argyllshire	Kilchoan	56°41′31″N 6°03′08″W		
Camas Chonalain Beag	Inverness-shire	Arnisdale	57°06′39″N 5°32′56″W		
Camas Chrònaig	Argyllshire	Lochaline	56°32′57″N 5°33′27″W		
Camas Cladh a' Mhuilinn	Argyllshire	Corran	56°42′57″N 5°15′46″W		
Camas Coille	Ross and Cromarty	Achiltibuie	58°05′20″N 5°23′16″W		
Camas Domhain	Inverness-shire	Arnisdale	57°06′16″N 5°34′29″W		
Camas Driseach	Inverness-shire	Lochailort	56°52′44″N 5°40′47″W		
Camas Driseach	Inverness-shire	Glenelg	57°08′19″N 5°34′59″W		
Camas Drollaman	Ross and Cromarty	Plockton	56°45′49″N 5°39′31″W		
Camas Dubh-Àird	Ross and Cromarty	Plockton	57°20′10″N 5°40′51″W		
Camas Eigneig	Argyllshire	Lochaline	56°32′01″N 5°35′08″W		
Camas Eilean Ghlais	Ross and Cromarty	Achiltibuie	58°04′49″N 5°27′26″W		
Camas Fearna	Argyllshire	Lochaline	56°38′03″N 5°50′31″W		
Camas Fearna	Argyllshire	Glenborrodale	56°41′02″N 5°57′28″W		
Camas Garbh	Inverness-shire	Inverie	57°06′46″N 5°43′35″W		
Camas Ghaoideil	Inverness-shire	Arisaig	56°53′09″N 5°49′48″W		
Camas Gorm	Argyllshire	Ardtornish	56°31′07″N 5°37′23″W		
Camas Glas	Ross and Cromarty	Poolewe	57°46′39″N 5°36′26″W		
Camas Leathann	Inverness-shire	Arisaig	56°52′57″N 5°51′50″W		
Camas Lèim an Taghain	Argyllshire	Lochaline	56°33′18″N 5°32′49″W		
Camas Loch nan Eun	Argyllshire	Lochaline	56°33′18″N 5°32′49″W		
Camas na Cailinn	Inverness-shire	Arnisdale	57°06′58″N 5°33′10″W		
Camas na Cille	Argyllshire	Lochaline	56°44′13″N 5°15′03″W		
Camas na Coille	Ross and Cromarty	Stromeferry	57°21′40″N 5°32′57″W		
Camas na Croise (Lochaber)	Argyllshire	Kingairloch	56°36′53″N 5°29′05″W		
Camas na Croise	Argyllshire	Fort William	56°50′45″N 5°10′32″W		
Camas na Cùirte	Argyllshire	Taynuilt	56°28′49″N 5°10′22″W		
Camas na h-Airigh	Ross and Cromarty	Shieldaig	57°41′47″N 5°42′08″W		
Camas na h-Airbhe	Argyllshire	Strontian	56°40′58″N 5°42′12″W		
Camas na h-Eirghe	Inverness-shire	North Ballachulish	56°42′12″N 5°04′26″W		
Camas na h-Eilde	Inverness-shire	Arisaig	56°53′36″N 5°46′18″W		
Camas na Ruthaig	Ross and Cromarty	Scoraig	57°55′48″N 5°22′39″W		
Camas nan Alltan	Argyllshire	Glenelg	57°10′34″N 5°41′03″W		
Camas nan Clacha' Mora	Inverness-shire	Glenelg	56°41′23″N 6°02′45″W		
Camas nan Gall	Ross and Cromarty	Camusnagaul	57°51′00″N 5°15′28″W		
Camas nan Geall	Argyllshire	Glenborrodale	56°40′58″N 5°59′18″W		
Camas nan Gobhar	Ross and Cromarty	Mellon Charles	57°51′46″N 5°38′23″W		
Camas nam Bad	Sutherland	Ullapool	58°15′24″N 5°09′12″W		
Camas nam Bùth	Argyllshire	Ballachulish	56°41′12″N 5°12′56″W		
Camas Mhic a' Phì	Argyllshire	Corran	56°42′42″N 5°16′22″W		
Camas Mòr	Ross and Cromarty	Cove	57°51′42″N 5°46′57″W		
Camas Mòr (Ross and Cromarty)	Ross and Cromarty	Strathkanaird	57°57′16″N 5°11′47″W		
Camas Mòr (Wester Ross)	Ross and Cromarty	Gairloch	57°43′53″N 5°45′20″W		
Cammachmore Bay	Kincardineshire	Portlethen	57°02′54″N 2°07′09″W		
Camas Nathais	Argyllshire	Benderloch	56°28′57″N 5°27′33″W		
Camas Phail	Ross and Cromarty	Poolewe	57°47′11″N 5°37′00″W		
Camas Rainich	Ross and Cromarty	Mellon Udrigle	57°54′59″N 5°34′54″W		
Camas Rubha a' Mhurain	Inverness-shire	Morar	56°56′41″N 5°51′24″W		
Camas Shallachain	Argyllshire	Corran	56°42′36″N 5°17′50″W		
Camas Shallachain	Argyllshire	Lochaline	56°33′00″N 5°53′14″W		
Camas Shamhairidh	Ross and Cromarty	Lochaline	56°32′35″N 5°51′07″W		
Camas Torr na Dùile	Argyllshire	Lochaline	56°33′34″N 5°32′39″W		
Cambuscurrie Bay	Ross and Cromarty (Dornch)	Tain	57°50′30″N 4°08′59″W		
Camp Bay North	Wigtownshire	Sandhead	54°48′41″N 5°03′51″W		
Camp Bay South	Wigtownshire	Sandhead	54°48′40″N 5°03′39″W		
Canty Bay	East Lothian	North Berwick	56°03′35″N 2°40′11″W		
Carleton Bay	Ayrshire	Lendalfoot	55°09′58″N 4°56′41″W		
Carlingheugh Bay	Fife	Arbroath	56°34′27″N 2°31′56″W		
Carradale Bay	Argyllshire	Carradale	55°34′22″N 5°28′52″W		
Carsaig Bay	Argyllshire	Tayvallich	56°01′53″N 5°38′25″W		
Carskey Bay	Argyllshire	Southend, Argyll	55°18′24″N 5°40′56″W		
Castle Bay (North Ayrshire)	Ayrshire	Largs	55°47′19″N 4°52′07″W		
Castle Bay (Highland)	Ross and Cromarty	Stromeferry	57°21′31″N 5°33′28″W		
Castle Haven	Kincardineshire	Stonehaven	56°56′56″N 2°11′45″W		
Castle Haven Bay	Dumfries and Galloway	Kirkcudbrightshire	54°48′32″N 4°11′31″W		
Chapel Rossan Bay	Wigtownshire	Ardwell	54°45′54″N 4°56′06″W		
Castlesea Bay	Angus	Abroath	56°35′03″N 2°31′09″W		
Clanyard Bay	Wigtownshire	Drummore	54°42′08″N 4°57′20″W		
Clashfarquhar Bay	Kincardineshire	Downies	57°02′29″N 2°07′24″W		
Clashrodney	Aberdeenshire	Cove Bay	57°05′02″N 2°05′17″W		
Claonaig Bay	Argyllshire	Tarbert	55°44′51″N 5°23′27″W		
Clashach Cove	Morayshire	Burghead	57°42′54″N 3°24′46″W		
Cour Bay	Argyllshire	Tarbert	55°40′57″N 5°27′16″W		
Coldingham Bay	Berwickshire	Coldingham	55°53′34″N 2°07′46″W		
Cove Bay	Argyllshire	Garelochhead	56°00′05″N 4°51′33″W		
Craigeven Bay	Kincardineshire	Stonehaven	56°58′40″N 2°11′02″W		
Crarae Bay	Argyllshire	Minard	56°07′41″N 5°14′02″W		
Crawton Bay	Kincardineshire	Catterline	56°54′20″N 2°12′05″W		
Cretshengan Bay	Argyllshire	Ormsary	55°50′08″N 5°39′47″W		
Cromarty Bay	Ross and Cromarty	Cromarty	57°40′30″N 4°06′00″W		
Crooked Haven	Kincardineshire	Inverbervie	56°51′42″N 2°14′09″W		
Crosskirk Bay	Caithness	Forss	58°36′37″N 3°40′40″W		
Cruggleton Bay	Wigtownshire	Garlieston	54°46′23″N 4°21′53″W		
Cuil Bay	Argyllshire	Duror	56°38′41″N 5°18′08″W		
Cullen Bay	Banffshire	Cullen	57°41′57″N 2°49′15″W		
Cullykhan Bay	Banffshire	Pennan	57°41′04″N 2°16′14″W		
Culzean Bay	Ayrshire	Maybole	55°21′48″N 4°47′22″W		
Culwatty Bay	Argyllshire	Rosneath	55°59′36″N 4°46′10″W		

== D ==
Name	County	Nearest Town or Village	Coordinates	Image	Notes
Dalavan Bay	Kirkcudbrightshire	Gatehouse of Fleet	54°51′03″N 4°14′16″W		
Dalgety Bay	Fife	Dalgety Bay	56°02′07″N 3°19′59″W		
Dallens Bay	Argyllshire		56°34′47″N 5°22′52″W		
Darn Bay	Kincardineshire	Inverbervie	56°51′14″N 2°14′54″W		
Dippen Bay	Argyllshire	Carradale	55°34′17″N 5°29′27″W		
Donibristle Bay	Fife	Dalgety Bay	56°01′46″N 3°20′58″W		
Dounan Bay	Wigtownshire	Leswalt	54°58′16″N 5°10′57″W		
Downie Bay	Aberdeenshire	Pennan	57°41′27″N 2°17′25″W		
Dunskeig Bay	Banffshire	Clachan	55°45′00″N 5°35′09″W		
Drumahowen Bay	Wigtownshire	Leswalt	54°55′48″N 5°11′11″W		
Drumantrae Bay	Wigtownshire	Ardwell	54°46′45″N 4°56′28″W		
Drumbreddan Bay	Wigtownshire	Ardwell	54°44′58″N 4°59′17″W		
Drummore Bay	Wigtownshire	Drummore	54°41′36″N 4°53′41″W		
Duartmore Bay	Sutherland	Scourie	58°16′21″N 5°06′01″W		
Dunanrea Bay	Wigtownshire	Portpatrick	54°48′45″N 5°04′03″W		
Dunaverty Bay	Argyllshire	Southend	55°18′31″N 5°39′02″W		
Dunbeath Bay	Caithness	Dunbeath	58°14′40″N 3°25′23″W		
Dunnet Bay	Caithness	Castletown, Highland	58°36′55″N 3°23′37″W		
Dunstaffnage Bay	Argyllshire	Dunbeg	56°27′04″N 5°25′52″W		

== E ==
Name	County	Nearest Town or Village	Coordinates	Image	Notes
East Bay	Argyllshire	Dunoon	55°57′06″N 4°55′11″W		
Earnsheugh Bay	Kincardineshire	Aberdeen	57°04′26″N 2°05′42″W		
Enard Bay	Ross and Cromarty	Lochinver	58°05′45″N 5°20′11″W		
Erbusaig Bay	Ross and Cromarty	Erbusaig	57°18′08″N 5°43′26″W		

== F ==
Name	County	Nearest Town or Village	Coordinates	Image	Notes
Faochag Bay	Ross and Cromarty	Altandhu	58°05′49″N 5°26′21″W		
Farr Bay	Sutherland	Bettyhill	58°32′06″N 4°13′09″W		
Fanagmore Bay	Sutherland	Tarbet	58°23′54″N 5°06′53″W		
Fascadale Bay	Argyllshire	Kilchoan	56°45′47″N 6°05′35″W		
Faslane Bay	Argyllshire	Garelochhead	56°03′33″N 4°49′19″W		
Fauldbog Bay	Kirkcudbrightshire	Kirkcudbright	54°46′24″N 4°06′48″W		
Fearnach Bay	Argyllshire	Kilmelford	56°16′00″N 5°30′09″W		
Fèith an Fheòir	Ross and Cromarty	Carnach	57°55′41″N 5°21′15″W		
Finart Bay	Argyllshire	Ardentinny	56°02′59″N 4°54′29″W		
Findhorn Bay	Morayshire	Findhorn	57°38′53″N 3°37′01″W		
Finlock Bay	Wigtownshire	Portpatrick	54°48′53″N 5°04′28″W		
Finnarts Bay	Wigtownshire	Cairnryan	55°00′33″N 5°03′06″W		
Freswick Bay	Caithness	Freswick	58°35′20″N 3°03′29″W		
Fleet Bay	Kirkcudbrightshire	Gatehouse of Fleet	54°50′34″N 4°13′39″W		
Float Bay	Wigtownshire	Sandhead	54°46′54″N 5°00′55″W		
Front Bay	Wigtownshire	Monreith	54°43′36″N 4°32′31″W		
Fraserburgh Bay	Aberdeenshire	Fraserburgh	57°41′03″N 1°58′16″W		

== G ==
Name	County	Nearest Town or Village	Coordinates	Image	Notes
Ganavan Bay	Argyllshire	Oban	56°26′15″N 5°28′33″W		
Gallanach Bay	Argyllshire	Oban	56°22′41″N 5°31′43″W		
Garlieston Bay	Kirkcudbrightshire	Garlieston	54°47′26″N 4°21′41″W		
Garrachcroit Bàgh Bay	Argyllshire	Carradale	55°38′36″N 5°28′57″W		
Gartnagrenach Bay	Argyllshire	Kennacraig	55°47′18″N 5°30′47″W		
Garvie Bay	Ross and Cromarty	Achiltibuie	58°04′15″N 5°18′52″W		
Gamrie Bay	Banffshire	Gardenstown	57°40′38″N 2°20′30″W		
Gillfoot Bay	Kirkcudbrightshire	Southerness	54°52′54″N 3°35′39″W		
Gills Bay	Caithness	Gills	58°38′38″N 3°09′06″W		
Glasnacardoch Bay	Argyllshire	Mallaig	56°59′39″N 5°50′06″W		
Glenan Bay	Argyllshire	Portavadie	55°52′55″N 5°19′48″W		
Glenelg Bay	Argyllshire	Glenelg	56°40′36″N 5°54′21″W		
Glenborrodale Bay	Argyllshire	Glenborrodale	56°40′36″N 5°54′21″W		
Glenmore Bay	Argyllshire	Glenborrodale	56°41′02″N 5°56′10″W		
Glenuig Bay	Inverness-shire	Glenuig	56°49′57″N 5°49′03″W		
Goat Well Bay	Kirkcudbrightshire	Kirkcudbright	54°48′40″N 4°05′01″W		
Gosford Bay	East Lothian	Aberlady	55°59′59″N 2°53′41″W		
Gourock Bay	Renfrewshire	Gourock	55°57′35″N 4°48′29″W		
Grey Hen Bay	Wigtownshire	Sandhead	54°48′37″N 5°03′29″W		
Grey Hope Bay	Aberdeen City	Aberdeen	57°08′28″N 2°03′00″W		
Gruinard Bay	Ross and Cromarty	Laide	57°52′32″N 5°29′18″W		
Gullane Bay	East Lothian	Gullane	56°02′16″N 2°51′28″W		

== H ==
Name	County	Nearest Town or Village	Coordinates	Image	Notes
Hackley Bay	Aberdeenshire	Collieston	57°19′54″N 1°57′09″W		
Haughs Bay	Kincardineshire	Inverbervie	56°48′32″N 2°18′22″W		
Hole Stone Bay	Wigtownshire	Ardwell	54°46′38″N 5°00′37″W		
Hilton Bay	Berwickshire	Eyemouth	55°49′39″N 2°03′03″W		
Horsecastle Bay	Berwickshire	Coldingham	55°54′36″N 2°07′50″W		
Horse Crook Bay	Kincardineshire	Inverbervie	56°49′50″N 2°16′27″W		
Howwell Bay	Kirkcudbrightshire	Kirkcudbright	54°46′19″N 4°01′41″W		

== I ==
Name	County	Nearest Town or Village	Coordinates	Image	Notes
Inninmore Bay	Argyllshire	Lochaline	56°30′35″N 5°42′11″W		
Inner Bay	Fife	Inverkeithing	56°01′32″N 3°23′43″W		
Inver Bay	Ross and Cromarty	Portmahomack	57°49′20″N 3°53′43″W		
Inverie Bay	Inverness-shire	Inverie	57°01′56″N 5°41′14″W		
Inverkip Bay	Renfrewshire	Inverkip	55°54′26″N 4°53′03″W		
Inverkeithing Bay	Fife	Inverkeithing	56°01′12″N 3°22′34″W		
Inverliver Bay	Argyllshire	Taynuilt	56°28′39″N 5°08′21″W		
Inverscaddle Bay	Argyllshire	Fort William	56°45′50″N 5°13′39″W		
Inversanda Bay	Argyllshire	Corran	56°40′47″N 5°21′16″W		
Ironmill Bay	Fife	Charlestown	56°02′19″N 3°31′19″W		
Irvine Bay	Ayrshire	Irvine	55°36′23″N 4°42′57″W		

== K ==
Name	County	Nearest Town or Village	Coordinates	Image	Notes
Kames Bay	Argyllshire	Port Bannatyne	55°52′00″N 5°04′53″W		
Kentallen Bay	Argyllshire	Duror	56°40′06″N 5°15′06″W		
Kentra Bay	Argyllshire	Acharacle	56°44′58″N 5°51′40″W		
Kerrachar Bay	Ross and Cromarty	Kylesku	58°15′51″N 5°06′10″W		
Kilberry Bay	Argyllshire	Ormsary	55°48′37″N 5°40′06″W		
Kilbride Bay	Argyllshire	Kames	55°50′46″N 5°15′45″W		
Kilchamaig Bay	Argyllshire	Kennacraig	55°47′55″N 5°29′46″W		
Kilchoan Bay	Argyllshire	Whitehouse	56°15′27″N 5°33′38″W		
Kilchoan Bay	Argyllshire	Kilchoan	56°41′33″N 6°07′08″W		
Kildalloig Bay	Argyllshire	Campbeltown	55°25′30″N 5°33′13″W		
Kildonald Bay	Argyllshire	Campbeltown	55°29′36″N 5°30′39″W		
Kilfinan Bay	Argyllshire	Kilfinan	55°57′17″N 5°20′10″W		
Killantringan Bay	Wigtownshire	Portpatrick	54°51′58″N 5°08′45″W		
Kilmory Bay	Argyllshire	Kilmory	55°54′26″N 5°41′10″W		
Kilstay Bay	Wigtownshire	Drummore	54°42′17″N 4°54′04″W		
Kirkandrews Bay	Kirkcudbrightshire	Kirkcudbright	54°48′23″N 4°10′58″W		
Kirkcudbright Bay	Kirkcudbrightshire	Kirkcudbright	54°47′05″N 4°04′02″W		
Kirtomy Bay	Sutherland	Bettyhill	58°32′56″N 4°09′37″W		
Knockbrex Bay	Dumfries and Galloway	Gatehouse of Fleet	54°49′12″N 4°12′32″W		
Knock Bay	Wigtownshire	Portpatrick	54°52′21″N 5°08′53″W		

== L ==
Name	County	Nearest Town or Village	Coordinates	Image	Notes
Lachlan Bay	Argyllshire	Strachur	56°06′21″N 5°12′36″W		
Lady Bay	Wigtownshire	Kirkcolm	54°59′59″N 5°04′59″W		
Laga Bay	Argyllshire	Kilchoan	56°40′45″N 5°51′58″W		
Lady Constance Bay	Sutherland	Lochinver	58°08′35″N 5°15′08″W		
Lamigo Bay	Sutherland	Coldbackie	58°32′24″N 4°19′13″W		
Largo Bay	Fife	Lower Largo	56°11′56″N 2°55′57″W		
Largs Bay	Ayrshire	Largs	55°47′50″N 4°52′26″W		
Links Bay	Banffshire	Portsoy	57°41′07″N 2°40′53″W		
Little John's Haven	Kincardineshire	Kinneff	56°51′33″N 2°14′28″W		
Lochan na Fionndalach Bige	Sutherland	Scourie	58°23′24″N 5°04′28″W		
Lùib Iomaire Mhòir Bay	Argyllshire	Inveraray	56°12′04″N 5°06′14″W		
Luce Bay	Dumfries and Galloway	Glenluce	54°45′05″N 4°45′08″W		
Lunan Bay	Angus	Montrose	56°38′56″N 2°29′20″W		
Lunderston Bay	Ayrshire	Inverkip	55°55′31″N 4°52′46″W		
Lybster Bay	Caithness	Lybster	58°17′39″N 3°17′17″W		

== M ==
Name	County	Nearest Town or Village	Coordinates	Image	Notes
Macharioch Bay	Argyllshire	Southend	55°19′20″N 5°33′58″W		
Machrihanish Bay	Argyllshire	Machrihanish	55°27′07″N 5°44′02″W		
Maidenhead Bay	Ayrshire	Maidens	55°20′21″N 4°49′00″W		
Maidenhead Bay	Wigtownshire	Portpatrick	54°50′49″N 5°07′44″W		
Maryport Bay	Wigtownshire	Drummore	54°40′16″N 4°52′23″W		
Meikleross Bay	Dunbartonshire	Kilcreggan	55°59′16″N 4°46′42″W		
Melvich Bay	Sutherland	Melvich	58°33′43″N 3°54′56″W		
Minard Bay	Argyllshire	Minard	56°06′02″N 5°15′32″W		
Millers Bay	Argyllshire	Ormsary	55°50′44″N 5°39′50″W		
Milsey Bay	East Lothian	North Berwick	56°03′38″N 2°41′56″W		
Monreith Bay	Wigtownshire	Monreith	54°43′51″N 4°33′12″W		
Montrose Bay	Angus	Montrose	56°44′48″N 2°25′01″W		
Mossyard Bay	Kirkcudbrightshire	Gatehouse of Fleet	54°50′26″N 4°15′08″W		
Mullock Bay	Kirkcudbrightshire	Kirkcudbright	54°46′16″N 4°00′15″W		
Munlochy Bay	Ross and Cromarty	Munlochy	57°32′45″N 4°12′41″W		
Murkle Bay	Caithness	Castletown	58°36′21″N 3°25′46″W		

== N ==
Name	County	Nearest Town or Village	Coordinates	Image	Notes
New England Bay	Wigtownshire	Ardwell	54°44′20″N 4°55′03″W		
Newton Bay	Argyllshire	Ardwell	56°08′20″N 5°09′17″W		
Nigg Bay	Ross and Cromarty	Invergordon	57°42′54″N 4°04′12″W		
Nigg Bay	Aberdeen	Aberdeen	57°07′58″N 2°03′09″W		
North Bay	Argyllshire	West Loch Tarbert	55°53′30″N 5°24′47″W		
North Bay	Ayrshire	Ardrossan	55°38′52″N 4°49′26″W		
North Berwick Bay	East Lothian	North Berwick	56°03′40″N 2°43′23″W		
North Haven	Aberdeenshire	Cruden Bay	57°26′10″N 1°48′55″W		
Nostie Bay	Ross and Cromarty	Auchertyre	57°16′42″N 5°33′41″W		
North Broad Haven	Aberdeenshire	Collieston	57°20′18″N 1°56′37″W		
Nun Mill Bay	Kirkcudbrightshire	Kirkcudbright	54°48′50″N 4°05′23″W		

== O ==
Name	County	Nearest Town or Village	Coordinates	Image	Notes
Oban Bay	Argyllshire	Oban	56°24′51″N 5°29′03″W		
Òb à Bhràighe	Ross and Cromarty	Inveralligin	57°33′14″N 5°37′49″W		
Ob Chuaig	Ross and Cromarty	Applecross	57°33′54″N 5°50′33″W		
Ob Gorm Beag	Ross and Cromarty	Shieldaig	57°31′56″N 5°34′34″W		
Òb Gorm Mòr	Ross and Cromarty	Shieldaig	57°32′05″N 5°33′55″W		
Òb Mheallaigh	Ross and Cromarty	Shieldaig	57°31′33″N 5°37′37″W		
Ob na Bà Ruaidhe	Ross and Cromarty	Poolewe	57°47′19″N 5°36′09″W		
Òb na h-Uamha	Ross and Cromarty	Shieldaig	57°34′45″N 5°49′30″W		
Old Dorney Bay	Ross and Cromarty	Altandhu	58°02′43″N 5°25′07″W		
Old Hall Bay	Kincardineshire	Stonehaven	56°56′39″N 2°11′49″W		
Orchardton Bay	Kirkcudbrightshire	Auchencairn	54°51′28″N 3°50′22″W		

== P ==
Name	County	Nearest Town or Village	Coordinates	Image	Notes
Pease Bay	Berwickshire	Dunbar	55°56′02″N 2°19′50″W		
Peatdraught Bay	City of Edinburgh	South Queensferry	56°00′04″N 3°21′22″W		
Pennan Bay	Banffshire	Pennan	57°40′53″N 2°15′37″W		
Peterhead Bay	Aberdeenshire	Peterhead	57°29′51″N 1°46′52″W		
Perthudden	Aberdeenshire	Collieston	57°20′27″N 1°56′24″W		
Perthumie Bay	Kincardineshire	Stonehaven	56°59′20″N 2°10′30″W		
Poll a' Mhuineil	Inverness-shire	Arnisdale	57°05′54″N 5°33′56″W		
Poll Domhain	Ross and Cromarty	Toscaig	57°23′21″N 5°49′25″W		
Polliwilline Bay	Argyllshire	Southend-on-Sea	55°19′40″N 5°33′35″W		
Polly Bay	Ross and Cromarty	Inverkirkaig	58°04′32″N 5°17′12″W		
Port Chaligaig	Sutherland	Balchrick	58°28′54″N 5°07′08″W		
Port a' Mhadaidh	Argyllshire	Carradale	55°38′44″N 5°28′45″W		
Port a' Mhadaidh	Argyllshire	Portavadie	55°52′08″N 5°18′46″W		
Port an Amaill	Ross and Cromarty	Melvaig	57°51′41″N 5°48′24″W		
Poll an Eòin Mòr	Ross and Cromarty	Mellon Udrigle	57°53′29″N 5°33′03″W		
Port an Lagaidh	Ross and Cromarty	Inveralligin	57°33′07″N 5°39′01″W		
Port an Fheadairigaig	Sutherland	Skerray	58°32′27″N 4°17′24″W		
Port Alltan na Bradhan	Sutherland	Lochinver	58°10′49″N 5°19′16″W		
Port Corbert	Argyllshire	Campbeltown	55°29′30″N 5°42′48″W		
Port Castle Bay	Wigtownshire	Isle of Whithorn	54°41′31″N 4°26′53″W		
Port Chamuill	Sutherland	Durness	58°30′36″N 4°41′28″W		
Port Cròm	Argyllshire	Glenbarr	55°30′23″N 5°42′47″W		
Port Erradale	Ross and Cromarty	North Erradale	57°45′45″N 5°48′18″W		
Port Fada	Argyllshire	Claonaig	55°43′58″N 5°25′13″W		
Port Kilchoan	Argyllshire	Kilchoan	56°45′47″N 6°04′54″W		
Port Lunna	Argyllshire	Cairnbann	56°01′00″N 5°35′39″W		
Port á Mhuilinn	Inverness-shire	Arisaig	56°53′55″N 5°51′50″W		
Port á Chinn	Sutherland	Armadale	58°33′35″N 4°05′34″W		
Port Allt á Mhuilinn	Sutherland	Strathy	58°35′04″N 4°02′50″W		
Port an Deora	Argyll	Kilmartion	56°06′27″N 5°33′07″W		
Port an Eilean Mhòir	Sutherland	Strathy	56°45′58″N 6°01′04″W		
Port an Righ	Ross and Cromarty	Balintore	57°44′01″N 3°55′40″W		
Port Laing	Fife	North Queensferry	56°00′58″N 3°23′23″W		
Port Mòr	Sutherland	Armadale	58°33′48″N 4°06′32″W		
Portnaughan Bay	Wigtownshire	Leswalt	54°58′55″N 5°10′53″W		
Port nan Clachan	Argyllshire	Campbeltown	55°31′29″N 5°42′43″W		
Port na Croise	Argyllshire	Campbeltown	55°29′55″N 5°42′45″W		
Port na Gaillinn	Argyllshire	Tarbert	55°47′51″N 5°39′30″W		
Port na h-Uamha	Inverness-shire	Glenelg	57°09′36″N 5°41′25″W		
Portlong Bay	Wigtownshire	Kirkcolm	54°58′36″N 5°11′07″W		
Port na Luinge	Argyllshire	Kilchoan	56°41′30″N 6°06′24″W		
Port nan Clach	Argyllshire	Kilchoan	58°18′10″N 5°08′37″W		
Port nan Spainteach	Argyllshire	Kilchoan	56°41′33″N 6°05′00″W		
Port Nessock Bay	Wigtownshire	Ardwell	54°43′34″N 4°58′11″W		
Port o'Warren Bay	Kirkcudbrightshire	Kippford	54°51′48″N 3°44′52″W		
Port of Brims	Caithness	Thurso	58°37′11″N 3°38′51″W		
Port of Spittal Bay	Wigtownshire	Portpatrick	54°49′25″N 5°05′09″W		
Port Vasgo	Sutherland	Talmine	58°33′10″N 4°25′40″W		
Portdown Bay	Wigtownshire	Drummore	54°39′26″N 4°56′57″W		
Portencorkrie	Wigtownshire	Drummore	54°40′34″N 4°57′51″W		
Port Haven	Fife	Aberdour	56°02′48″N 3°18′11″W		
Portkil Bay	Dunbartonshire	Cove	55°59′04″N 4°47′56″W		
Portling Bay	Dumfriesshire	Kippford	54°52′06″N 3°44′24″W		
Portyerrock Bay	Kirkcudbrightshire	Whithorn	54°43′13″N 4°21′32″W		
Preston Bay			55°57′42″N 2°59′39″W		

== R ==
Name	County	Nearest Town or Village	Coordinates	Image	Notes
Rascarrel Bay	Kirkcudbrightshire	Auchencairn	54°48′46″N 3°51′30″W		
Reiff Bay	Ross and Cromarty	Reiff	58°04′12″N 5°27′10″W		
Rispond Bay	Sutherland	Durness	58°32′53″N 4°39′30″W		
Rouen Bay	Kincardineshire	Inverbervie	56°52′33″N 2°13′13″W		
Ronachan Bay	Argyllshire	Clachan	55°44′13″N 5°35′54″W		
Rosneath Bay	Dunbartonshire	Rosneath	56°00′08″N 4°47′07″W		
Ross Bay	Kirkcudbrightshire	Kirkcudbright	54°46′42″N 4°05′57″W		
Rosemarkie Bay	Ross and Cromarty	Rosemarkie	57°35′04″N 4°05′33″W		

== S ==
Name	County	Nearest Town or Village	Coordinates	Image	Notes
Saddell Bay	Argyllshire	Carradale	55°31′35″N 5°29′59″W		
Salann Bay	Argyllshire	Kames	55°51′17″N 5°18′06″W		
Salt Pan Bay	Wigtownshire	Leswalt	54°57′35″N 5°10′57″W		
Salt Pans Bay	Wigtownshire	Leswalt	54°54′21″N 5°10′41″W		
Sandaig Bay	Inverness-shire	Arnisdale	57°02′42″N 5°45′53″W		
Sandend Bay	Banffshire	Portsoy	57°41′15″N 2°44′18″W		
Sanna Bay	Argyllshire	Kilchoan	56°44′30″N 6°11′31″W		
Sandhead Bay	Wigtownshire	Sandhead	54°48′23″N 4°57′16″W		
Sandside Bay	Caithness	Reay	58°33′58″N 3°47′02″W		
Sandwood Bay	Highland	Balchrick	58°32′42″N 5°03′35″W		
Sandyhills Bay	Kirkcudbrightshire	Sandyhills	54°52′43″N 3°43′32″W		
Sango Bay	Sutherland	Durness	58°34′08″N 4°44′04″W		
Savary Bay	Argyllshire	Lochaline	56°32′31″N 5°50′37″W		
Scourie Bay	Sutherland	Scourie	58°21′22″N 5°10′22″W		
Senwick Bay	Kirkcudbrightshire	Kirkcudbright	54°48′05″N 4°05′18″W		
Shandwick Bay	Ross and Cromarty	Balintore	57°45′04″N 3°54′50″W		
Shell Bay	Fife	Elie and Earlsferry	56°11′28″N 2°52′27″W		
Silversands Bay	Fife	Aberdour	56°03′14″N 3°16′52″W		
Sinclairs Bay	Caithness	Nybster	58°30′35″N 3°05′43″W		
Skateraw Harbour	East Lothian	Dunbar	55°58′21″N 2°25′14″W		
Skerray Bay	Sutherland	Skerray	58°32′33″N 4°18′06″W		
Skipness Bay	Argyllshire	Skipness	55°45′51″N 5°20′33″W		
Skyreburn Bay	Kirkcudbrightshire	Gatehouse of Fleet	54°51′48″N 4°13′06″W		
Slaggan Bay	Ross and Cromarty	Mellon Charles	57°53′06″N 5°39′03″W		
Slouchnamorroch Bay	Wigtownshire	Ardwell	54°42′42″N 4°57′42″W		
Slouchnawen Bay	Wigtownshire	Stranraer	54°55′35″N 5°11′11″W		
South Bay	Argyllshire	Tarbert	55°53′05″N 5°24′26″W		
South Bay	Ayrshire	Ardrossan	55°38′20″N 4°48′38″W		
Spey Bay	Banffshire	Findochty	57°42′03″N 2°53′29″W		
St Andrews Bay	Fife	St Andrews	56°20′41″N 2°48′00″W		
Starney Bay	Berwickshire	St Abbs	55°54′10″N 2°07′52″W		
Strachur Bay	Argyllshire	Strachur	56°10′03″N 5°05′05″W		
Strathmarchin Bay	Banffshire	Portsoy	57°41′19″N 2°39′18″W		
Stonehaven Bay	Kincardineshire	Stonehaven	56°58′14″N 2°11′39″W		
Stotfield Bay	Argyllshire	Tarbert	55°51′14″N 5°39′24″W		
Strath Bay	Ross and Cromarty	Gairloch	57°43′50″N 5°42′22″W		
Strathy Bay	Sutherland	Melvich	58°34′10″N 3°59′50″W		
Strathlethan Bay	Kincardineshire	Stonehaven	56°57′18″N 2°11′47″W		
Strool Bay	Wigtownshire	Stranraer	54°56′32″N 5°11′11″W		
Stroul Bay	Dunbartonshire	Rosneath	56°00′48″N 4°48′18″W		

== T ==
Name	County	Nearest Town or Village	Coordinates	Image	Notes
Tarbet Bay	Inverness-shire	Morar	56°58′23″N 5°38′13″W		
Terally Bay	Wigtownshire	Drummore	54°43′50″N 4°54′51″W		
The Wig	Wigtownshire	Kirkcolm	54°57′51″N 5°03′43″W		
Thornyhive Bay	Kincardineshire	Stonehaven	56°55′59″N 2°11′47″W		
Thurso Bay	Caithness	Thurso	58°36′31″N 3°31′16″W		
Toll a' Bhuic	Argyllshire	Ardentinny	56°05′01″N 4°52′41″W		
Toll nam Muc	Argyllshire	Ardentinny	56°05′55″N 4°53′14″W		
Tongue Bay	Sutherland	Tongue	58°31′34″N 4°23′30″W		
Torrisdale Bay	Argyllshire	Carradale	55°34′03″N 5°29′30″W		
Torrisdale Bay	Sutherland	Bettyhill	58°31′54″N 4°14′42″W		
Torry Bay	Fife	Newmills	56°03′08″N 3°34′30″W		
Tràigh Bhàn	Argyllshire	Tayvallich	55°56′44″N 5°39′59″W		
Trelong Bay	Kincardineshire	Stonehaven	56°53′57″N 2°12′20″W		
Tremuda Bay	Kincardineshire	Stonehaven	56°56′16″N 2°11′46″W		
Turnberry Bay	Ayrshire	Turnberry	55°18′55″N 4°50′41″W		
Twa Havens	Aberdeenshire	Cruden Bay	57°25′11″N 1°49′30″W		

== U ==
Name	County	Nearest Town or Village	Coordinates	Image	Notes
Udale Bay	Ross and Cromarty	Cromarty	57°40′00″N 4°08′55″W		
Union Bay	Argyllshire	Minard	56°05′38″N 5°16′09″W		

== W ==
Name	County	Nearest Town or Village	Coordinates	Image	Notes
Weaver's Bay	Sutherland	Tarbet	58°23′05″N 5°03′48″W		
Wemyss Bay	Ayrshire	Wemyss Bay	55°52′54″N 4°53′30″W		
West Bay	Argyllshire	Dunoon	55°56′33″N 4°55′43″W		
West Bay	Renfrewshire	Gourock	55°57′31″N 4°49′51″W		
Whitebridge Bay	Argyllshire	Furnace	56°08′35″N 5°12′19″W		
Whitehouse Bay	West Lothian	Edinburgh	55°59′43″N 3°22′15″W		
Whitehouse Bay	Argyll and Bute	Ardrishaig	55°58′41″N 5°26′42″W		
Whitelinks Bay	Aberdeenshire	Inverallochy	57°40′11″N 1°54′54″W		
Wick Bay	Highland	Wick	55°59′43″N 3°22′15″W		
Wigtown Bay	Wigtownshire	Garlieston	54°46′35″N 4°15′26″W		
Wood Haven	Fife	Elie and Earlsferry	56°11′08″N 2°48′54″W		
Woodland Bay	Ayrshire	Girvan	55°13′17″N 4°52′16″W		

== See also ==
- Firths of Scotland
- Lochs of Scotland
