= List of bays of the British Isles =

This is a list of bays of the British Isles, geographically by island. They are listed by island, in clockwise order, from the stated starting point.

== Britain ==
Clockwise from the River Tweed:

=== England from the River Tweed to the Bristol Channel ===
- Budle Bay
- Druridge Bay
- Whitley Bay
- Tees Bay
- Runswick Bay
- Saltwick Bay
- Robin Hood's Bay
- Hayburn Wyke
- Cloughton Wyke
- Jackson's Bay (also known as Scalby Ness Sands)
- North Bay, Scarborough
- South Bay, Scarborough
- Cornelian Bay
- Cayton Bay
- Gristhorpe Bay
- Filey Bay
- Selwicks Bay
- Bridlington Bay
- The Wash
- Hollesley Bay
- Pegwell Bay
- Rye Bay
- Pevensey Bay
- Seaford Bay
- Friars' Bay
- Bracklesham Bay
- Hayling Bay
- Stokes Bay
- Stanswood Bay
- Christchurch Bay
- Poole Bay
- Brambelbush Bay
- Shell Bay
- Studland Bay
- Swanage Bay
- Durlston Bay
- Kimmeridge Bay
- Hobarrow Bay
- Brandy Bay
- Worbarrow Bay
- Mupe Bay
- St Oswald's Bay
- Ringstead Bay
- Weymouth Bay
- Balaclava Bay
- West Bay
- Lyme Bay
- Labrador Bay
- Tor Bay
- Start Bay
- Bigbury Bay
- St Austell Bay
- Veryan Bay
- Gerrans Bay
- Falmouth Bay
- Mount's Bay
- St Ives Bay
- Ligger Bay
- Watergate Bay
- Padstow Bay
- Bude Bay
- Barnstaple Bay (Bideford Bay)
- Morte Bay
- Porlock Bay
- Bridgwater Bay
- Weston Bay
- Ladye Bay

=== Wales ===
- Cardiff Bay
- Swansea Bay
- Rhossili Bay
- Carmarthen Bay
- St Bride's Bay
- Fishguard Bay
- Newport Bay
- Cardigan Bay
- Tremadog Bay
- Caernarfon Bay
- Holyhead Bay
- Conwy Bay

=== England from the River Dee to the Solway Firth ===
- Liverpool Bay
- Morecambe Bay
- Duddon Estuary
- Moricambe Bay

=== Scotland ===
==== Solway Firth to Oban ====
- Kirkcudbright Bay
- Wigtown Bay
- Luce Bay
- Ayr Bay
- Irvine Bay
- Wemyss Bay
- Inverkip Bay
- Lunderston Bay
- West Bay
- Gourock Bay
- Culwatty Bay
- Meikleross Bay
- Portkill Bay
- Stroul Bay
- Faslane Bay
- Cove Bay
- Finart Bay
- East Bay
- West Bay
- Ettrick Bay
- St Ninians Bay
- Scalpsie Bay
- Gallachan Bay
- Lubas Bay
- Glencallum Bay
- Kilchattan Bay
- Kerrylamont Bay
- Kerrycroy Bay
- Ascog Bay
- Rothesay Bay
- Kames Bay
- White Bay (Scotland)
- Stinking Bay
- Bellochmartin Bay
- Millport Bay
- Fintray Bay
- Bell Bay (Scotland)
- Steadholm Bay
- Long Bay (Scotland)
- Sannox Bay
- Catacol Bay
- Machrie Bay
- Drumadoon Bay
- Whiting Bay
- Lamlash Bay
- Brodick Bay
- Blindmans Bay
- Ardlamont Bay
- Kilbride Bay
- Asgog Bay
- Glenan Bay
- Ardmarnock Bay
- Auchalick Bay
- Kilfinan Bay
- Lachlan Bay
- Newton Bay
- Strachur Bay
- Whitebridge Bay
- Blackstone Bay
- Crarae Bay
- Achagoyle Bay
- Brainport Bay
- Minard Bay
- Union Bay (Scotland)
- Brenfield Bay
- Whitehouse Bay
- North Bay
- South Bay (Scotland)
- Skipness Bay
- Claonaig Bay
- Cour Bay
- Carradale Bay
- Dippen Bay
- Torrisdale Bay
- Saddel Bay
- Kildonald Bay
- Black Bay
- Ardnacross Bay
- Kildalloig Bay
- Polliwillne Bay
- Macharioch Bay
- Brunerican Bay
- Dunaverty Bay
- Carskey Bay
- Machrihanish Bay
- Bellochantuy Bay
- Ronachan Bay
- Dunskeig Bay
- Gartnagrenach Bay
- Kilchamaig Bay
- Kilberry Bay
- Cretshengan Bay
- Millers Bay
- Stotfield Bay
- Kilmory Bay
- Carsaig Bay <- One next to Tayvallich. Needs disamg.
- Asknish Bay
- Kames Bay
- Fearnach Bay
- Kilchoan Bay
- Ardmaddy Bay
- Balvicar Bay
- Easdale Sound
- Barnacarry Bay
- Ardentallen Bay
- Oban Bay

==== Oban to Cape Wrath ====
- Oban Bay
- Ardantrive Bay - Kerrara
- The Horse Shoe
- The Little Horse Shoe - Kerrara
- Barr-nam-boc Bay
- Slatrach Bay - Kerrara
- Ganavan Bay - Oban
- Dunstaffnage Bay
- Airds Bay - Brochroy
- Inverliver Bay - Loch Etive
- Ardmaddy Bay - Etive
- Achnacree Bay - Etive
- Ardmucknish Bay
- Camas Nathais
- Airds Bay - Appin
- Bagh clach an dobhrain - Lismore
- Bernera Bay
- Cuil Bay - Duror
- Inverscaddle Bay
- Camas Shallachain
- Inversanda Bay
- Camas Chil Mhalieu
- Camas na Croise - Next to Loch a Choire
- Camas Airign Shamhraidh
- Camas Torr na Dùile
- Camas Chròaig
- Camas Eigneig
- Camas Gorm
- Inninmore Bay
- Ardtornish Bay
- Savary Bay
- Camas Shamhairidh
- Camas Shalachain
- Camas Glas - Loch Sunart
- Camas Salach - Sunart
- Camas na h-Airbhe
- Bàgh an t-Sàlein
- Laga Bay
- Glenborrodale Bay
- Glenmore Bay
- Camas Fearna
- Camas Bàn - Loch Sunart
- Camas nan Geall
- Camas nan Clachà Mora
- Kilchoan Bay - Kilchoan
- Briaghlann
- Sanna Bay
- Fascadale Bay
- Camas an Lighe
- Kentra Bay
- Glenuig Bay
- Camia Driseach - Loch Aillort
- Camas na h-Eilde - Loch nam Uamh
- Camas Ghaoideil
- Camas Leathann
- Camas Drollaman
- Camas an t-Salainn
- Camas Rubha a' Mhurain
- Camas an Daraich
- Camas Aird nam Fiasgan - River Morar, Loch Morar Bays
- Glasnacardoch Bay
- Ardingtigh Bay
- Tarbet Bay
- Inverie Bay
- Sandaig Bay
- Camas Garbh
- Camas Domhain
- Poll a Mhuineil
- Barrisdale Bay - Loch Hourn
- Camas Bày
- Camas Driseach
- Camas nan Alltan
- Glenelg Bay
- Camas nan Gall
- Ardintoul Bay
- Nostle Bay
- Balmacara Bay
- Erbusaig Bay
- Bàgh an t-Strathaidh
- Camas Dubh-Àird
- Camas Deannd
- Castle Bay
- Poll Creadha
- Applecross Bay
- Camas an Eilean
- Camas an Lèim
- Òb Mheallaigh
- Camas à Chlàrsair
- Ob Gorm Beag
- Òb Gorm Mòr
- Òb à Bhràighe
- Camas á Bhata
- Camas na h-Airigh
- Strath Bay
- Coalas Beag
- Camasan Dearge
- Camas Mòr
- Camas Allt Eoin Thòmais
- Camas Glas
- Camas Phail
- Ob na Bà Ruaidhe
- Slaggan Bay
- Camas á Charraig
- Poll an Eòin Mòr
- Camas á Chruthach
- Camas nan Gall
- Camus na Ruthaig
- Annat Bay
- Camas Á Chonnaidh
- Camas an Daimh
- Camas á Bhuailidh - Isle Martin
- Camas Mòr
- Badentarbat Bay
- Reiff Bay
- Camas Eilean Ghlais
- Faochag Bay
- Camas Coille
- Achnahaird Bay
- Garvie Bay
- Lag na Saillie
- Polly Bay
- Gruinard Bay
- Enard Bay
- Achmelvich Bay
- Clashnessie Bay
- Eddrachillis Bay

==== Cape Wrath to Moray Firth ====
- Dunnet Bay
- Sinclairs Bay

==== Moray Firth to Rattray Head ====
- Burghhead Bay
- Spey Bay
- Whale's Wig
- Portessie Bay
- Portknockie Hythe
- Cullen Bay
- Muckle Hythe
- Portlong Hythe
- Sunnyside Bay
- Sandend Bay
- Red Haven
- Links Bay, Portsoy
- Strathmarchin Bay
- Old Hythe
- Boyne Bay
- Boyndie Bay
- Banff Bay
- Tarlair Bay
- Bay of Cullen, Macduff
- Old Haven
- Gamrie Bay
- Downie Bay
- Cullykhan Bay
- Pennan Bay
- Aberdour Bay
- Auld Mill Bay
- Haven of Braco
- Bay of Lochielair
- Craig Haven
- Maw's Haven
- Broadsea Bay
- Fraserburgh Bay
- Whitelinks Bay

==== Rattray Head to River Tweed ====
- Peterhead Bay
- Sandford Bay
- Long Haven
- Yoags' Haven
- North Haven
- Robie's Haven
- Twa Havens
- Bay of Cruden
- Bruce's Haven
- Radel Haven
- Broad Haven
- Perthudden
- North Broad Haven
- Hackley Bay
- Aberdeen Bay
- Greyhope Bay
- Nigg Bay
- Doonies Yawns
- Robin Hood Yawns
- Altens Haven
- Burnbanks Haven
- Cove Bay
- Colsea Yawn
- Clashrodney
- Earnsheugh Bay
- Doo Cove
- Arnot Boo
- Portlethen Bay
- Cammachmore Bay
- Downies Haven
- Clashfarquhar Bay
- Newtonhill Bay
- Bettridge Bay
- Grim Haven
- Hall Bay
- Perthumie Bay
- Craigeven Bay
- Stonehaven Bay
- Strathlethan Bay
- Castle Haven
- Old Hall Bay
- Tremuda Bay
- Thornyhive Bay
- Trelung Bay
- Crawton Bay
- Trelong Bay
- Catterline Bay
- Braidon Bay
- Rouen Bay
- Rough Haven
- Crooked Haven
- Little John's Haven
- Darn Bay
- Bervie Bay
- Horse Crook Bay
- Haughs Bay
- Montrose Bay
- Lunan Bay
- Invergowrie Bay
- St Andrews Bay (Fife)
- Largo Bay
- Aberlady Bay
- Gosford Bay
- Coldingham Bay

== Hebrides ==
=== Islay ===
- Laggan Bay

=== Mull ===
- Carsaig Bay
- Calgary Bay

=== Lewis ===
- Broad Bay

== Orkney Mainland ==
- Scapa Bay
- Bay of Firth
- Bay of Kirkwall
- Inganess Bay

== Isle of Man ==
Clockwise from the Point of Ayre

- Ramsey Bay, Ramsey
- Bulgham Bay
- Laxey Bay, Laxey
- Garwick Bay
- Douglas Bay, Douglas
- Derby Haven, Derbyhaven
- Castletown Bay, Castletown
- Bay ny Carrickey, Port St Mary
- Port St Mary Bay
- Perwick Bay
- Bay Stacka
- Port Erin Bay, Port Erin
- Fleshwick Bay, Port Erin
- Niarbyl Bay, Patrick
- Peel Bay, Peel

== Isle of Wight ==
Clockwise from Cowes

- Osborne Bay
- Seagrove Bay, Seaview
- Priory Bay
- Whitecliff Bay
- Horseshoe Bay, near Culver Down
- Sandown Bay, Sandown, Shanklin
- Luccombe Bay
- Steel Bay
- Monks Bay, Bonchurch
- Horseshoe Bay, Bonchurch
- Wheelers Bay
- Ventnor Bay, Ventnor
- Woody Bay
- Binnel Bay
- Reeth Bay
- Watershoot Bay
- Chale Bay, Blackgang Chine
- Brighstone Bay
- Brook Bay, Brook
- Compton Bay
- Freshwater Bay, Freshwater
- Watcombe Bay
- Scratchell's Bay
- Alum Bay
- Totland Bay, Totland
- Colwell Bay
- Newtown Bay
- Thorness Bay
- Gurnard Bay

== Ireland ==
Anti-clockwise from Lough Foyle:

=== Northern Ireland ===
- Dundrum Bay
- Red Bay
- Ballycastle Bay

== See also ==
- Firths of Scotland
- Lochs of Scotland
