= Loch Arail =

- Loch Ellen
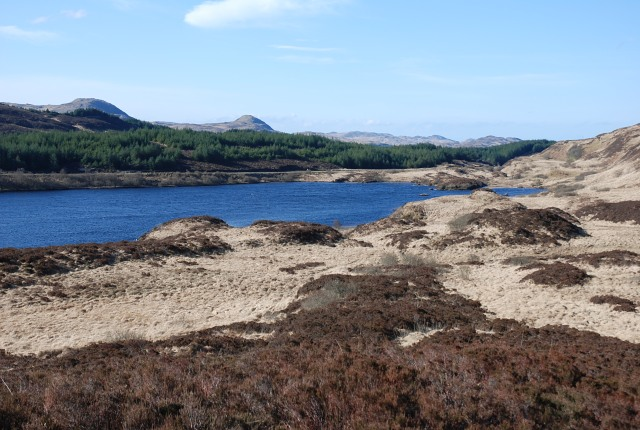
- Loch Arail from its northeast shore

- Location within Argyll and Bute
- Location: Scottish Highlands
- Coordinates: 55°57′30″N 5°30′40″W
- Primary outflows: Allt Claigionnaich
- Basin countries: Scotland, United Kingdom
- Max. length: 778 m (2,552 ft)
- Max. width: 351 m (1,152 ft)
- Surface elevation: 198 m (650 ft)

Loch Arail (sometimes listed as Loch Ellen) is a remote loch in Argyll, Scotland, situated on the side of the B8024 road roughly 2.8km northwest of the settlement of Achahoish.

OS maps from the late 19th century record the loch's name as "Errol". It is unclear whether the loch's toponymy is related to the village of Errol, in Perthshire.

The loch has a stock of brown trout suitable for fishing.

Loch Arail sits on a bedrock of quartzite and pelite. A large peat bog known as Moine an t-Saraiche sits on its southern shore.
