= Ardlamont Point =

Headland in Argyll and Bute, Scotland

- Headland
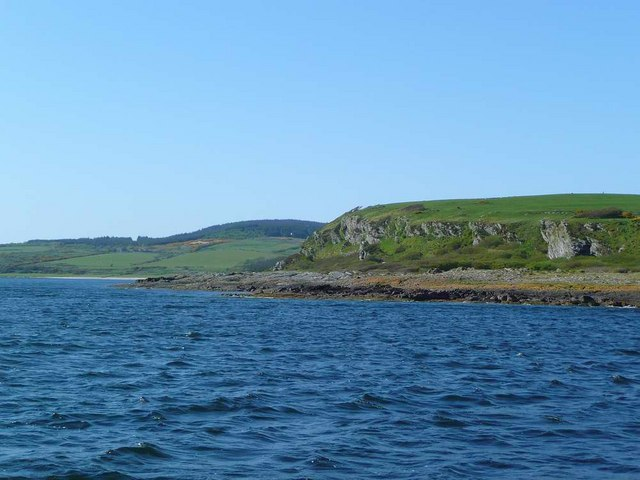
- The western tip of Ardlamont Point

- Coordinates: 55.825951°N 5.207273°W
- Grid position: NM416674
- Location: Cowal, Argyll and Bute, Scotland

Ardlamont Point is a headland in Argyll and Bute, Scotland. It is the southern-most point of the Cowal peninsular, situated in the far south-west of that peninsular. Ardlamont House, with its surrounding estate, lies to the north of the point.

Offshore of the point, the waters of Loch Fyne, to the west, and the Kyles of Bute, to the east, meet the Firth of Clyde, to the south. The sandy beach of Kilbride Bay is 2.5 miles (4.0 km) to the north-west.
