= Ardlamont House =

House in Argyll and Bute, Scotland, UK

Coordinates: 55.842243°N 5.226243°W

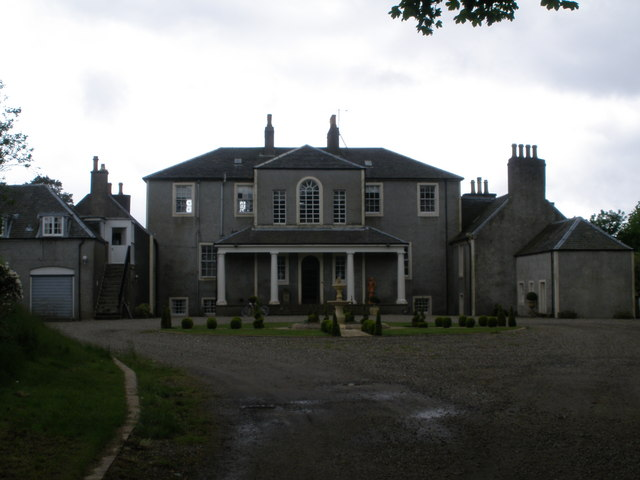

Ardlamont House is a Georgian estate house in Argyll, Scotland. It is surrounded by the Ardlamont Estate and adjacent to Ardlamont Point, the southern-most point point of the Cowal peninsula. It is some 5.5 kilometres (3.4 mi) south of Kames.

The two-storey house is harled. The main block has a piended (hipped) slate roof, while the single-storey wings have skew (sloping) gables. A well-preserved obelisk sundial is located in the garden, whilst a range of estate buildings is nearby. All three are designated as Category B listed buildings by Historic Environment Scotland.

The house was built c.1820 for Major General John Lamont, 19th chief of the Clan Lamont. The house and estate, by then rented out, were the location of the Ardlamont murder in 1893. The house and estate were sold in the same year by Major John Henry Lamont, the 21st chief of the clan.
