= Glenborrodale Bay =

Bay in Lochaber, Scotland

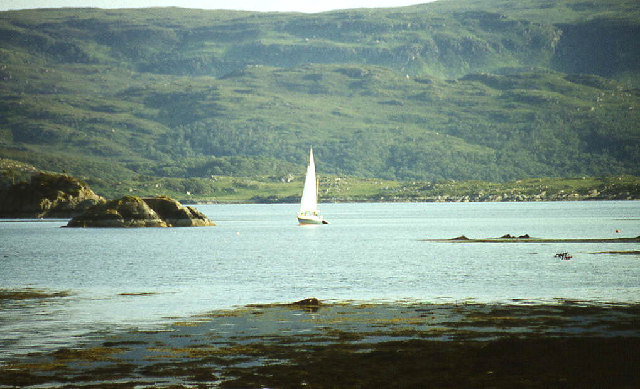
- Glenborrodale Bay with Risga island on left

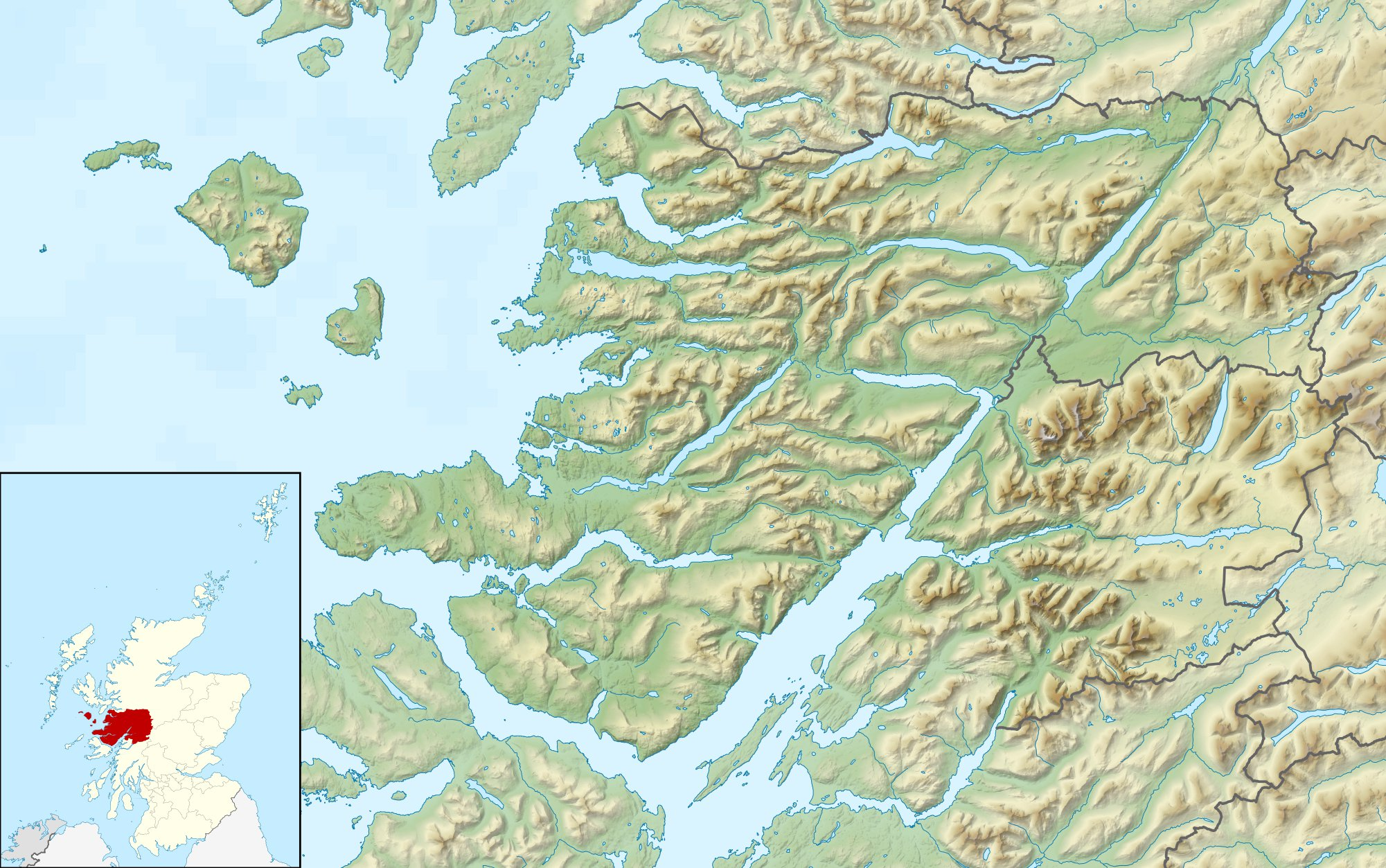
- Location within Lochaber
- Location: Loch Sunart; Ardnamurchan, Scotland
- Coordinates: 56°40′36.48″N 5°54′21.281″W
- Ocean/sea sources: Atlantic Ocean
- Basin countries: Scotland
- Max. length: 0.45 km (0.28 mi)
- Max. width: 0.22 km (0.14 mi)
- Islands: Risga
- Settlements: Glenborrodale

Glenborrodale Bay is a remote tidal, 200° orientated, coastal embayment, located on the southern coastline of the west to east orientated Ardnamurchan peninsula, at the head of the sea loch Loch Sunart in western Scottish Highlands of Scotland. To the west is the large Ardgour peninsula, of which the Ardnamurchan and the larger Morven peninsula to the south is part of.

== Settlements ==
At the head of the bay is the small settlement of Glenborrodale. The minor single lane with passing places, B Road: B8007 provides access to the bay, and connects to the main A861 at Salen 6 miles to the east. The late Victorian Glenborrowdale Castle, the former baronial home of Jesse Boot, who founded the Boots Chemists overlooks the bay and the panorama of Loch Sunart to the east.

The small settlement at Glenborrodale hosts a hotel, Glenborrowdale hotel.

== Geography ==
Glenborrodale Bay is orientated almost North to South with a slight leaning eastwards at the north. The north end of the bay consists of tidal flats, fed by a small burn which has a number of channels across the flats. The north end of the bay is square in shape with an opening of around 220 metres. The bay opens out some 400 metres from the head of the bay, into the main flow of Loch Sunart. At the mouth of the bay, is the tiny island of Sgeir à Choir, to the east is the small island of Eilean an Fhèidh, to the west Sgeir Bhuidhe. In the mouth of the bay, is the small island of Risga. The eastern edge of the large island of Drium Mòr, that is located close to the southern coast of Loch Sunart, can be clearly from the bay. Port Phadriug, which provides access to the island, is directly opposite the mouth of the bay.

To the west of the bay, lies the tiny settlement of Glenmore on Glenmore Bay and to the east Laga Bay and the village of Laga.

== Tourism ==
Next to the beach is the well known 100ha Glenborrowdale woods, a Royal Society for the Protection of Birds reserve, which has a good selection of woodland birds.

Loch Sunart is well known for water sports including canoeing and is exceedingly busy in summer, for such a remote location.

== Gallery ==
Images of Lochan Fada

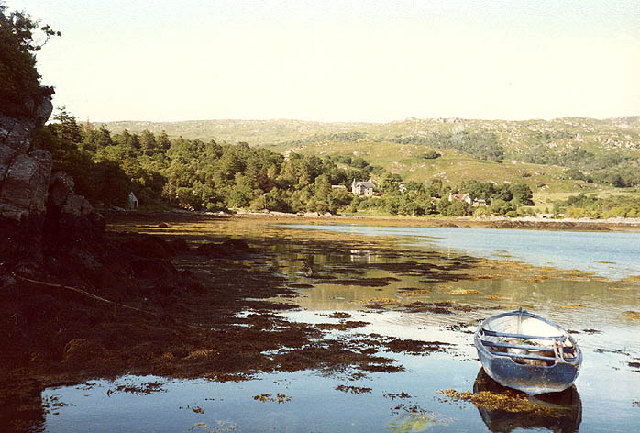
Glenborrodale Bay from the landing.

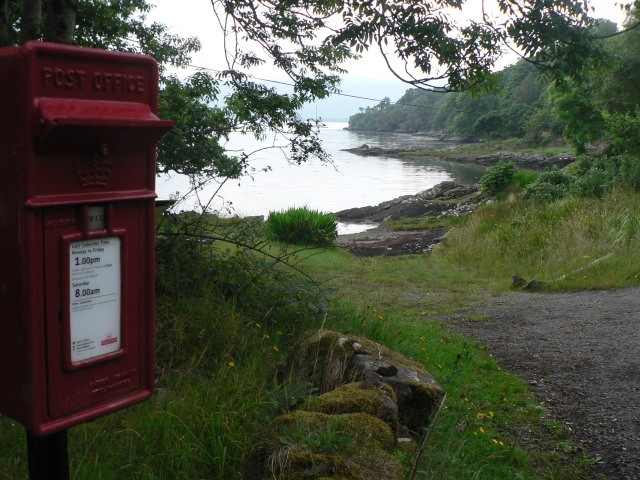
Glimpse of the bay from the postbox № PH36 88.

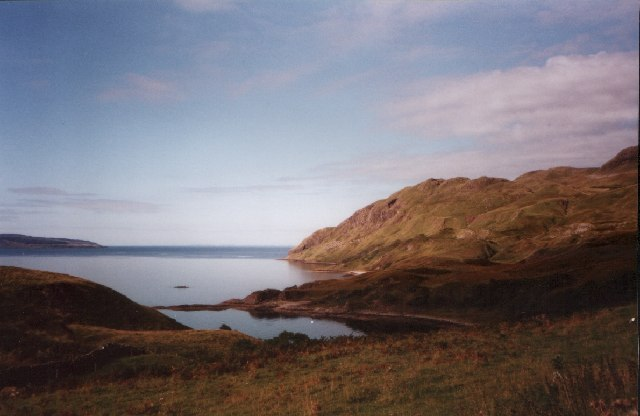
Camas Fearna

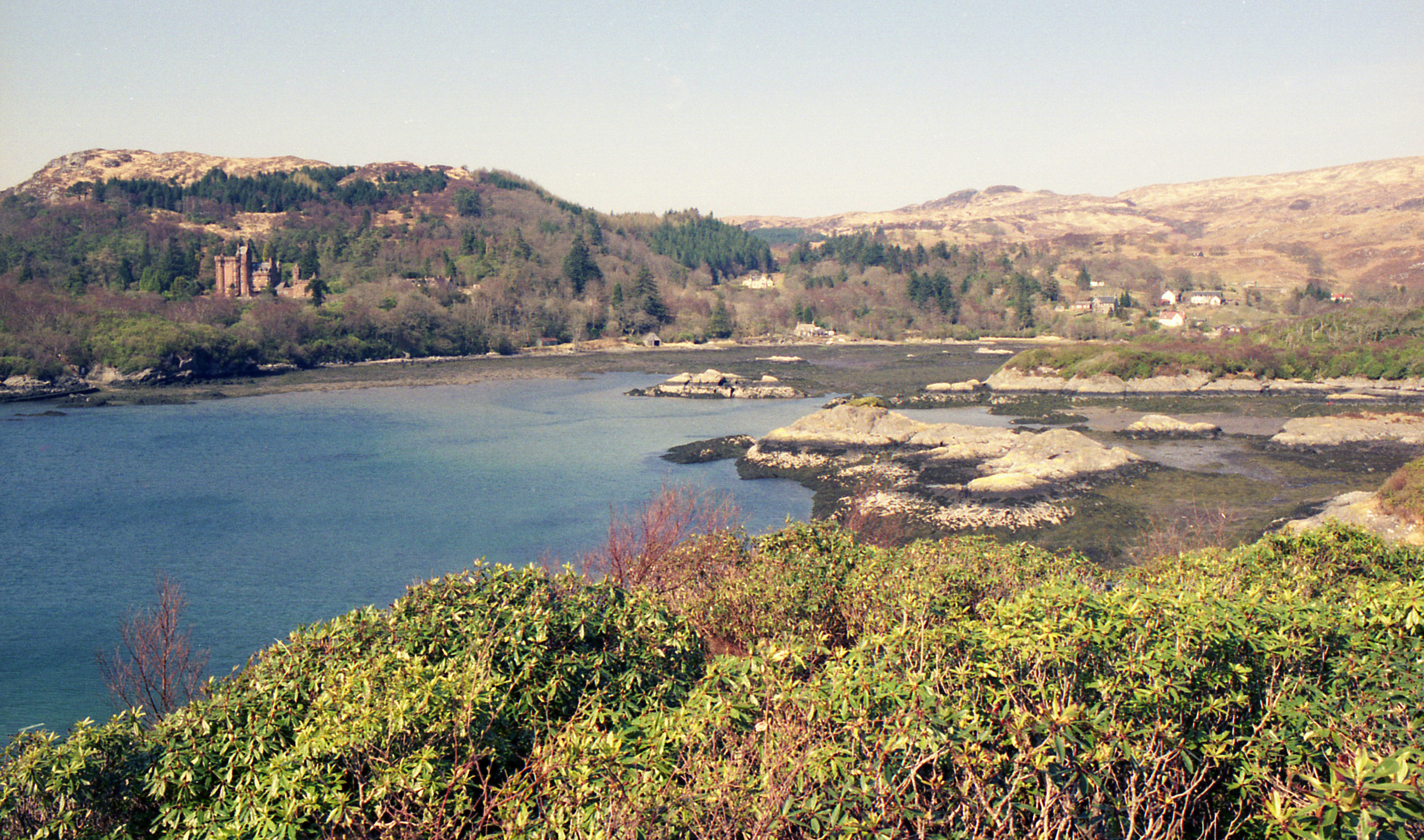
Another view of the bay
