= Wheelers Bay =

Bay on the Isle of Wight, England

Coordinates: 50°35′40″N 1°11′45″W

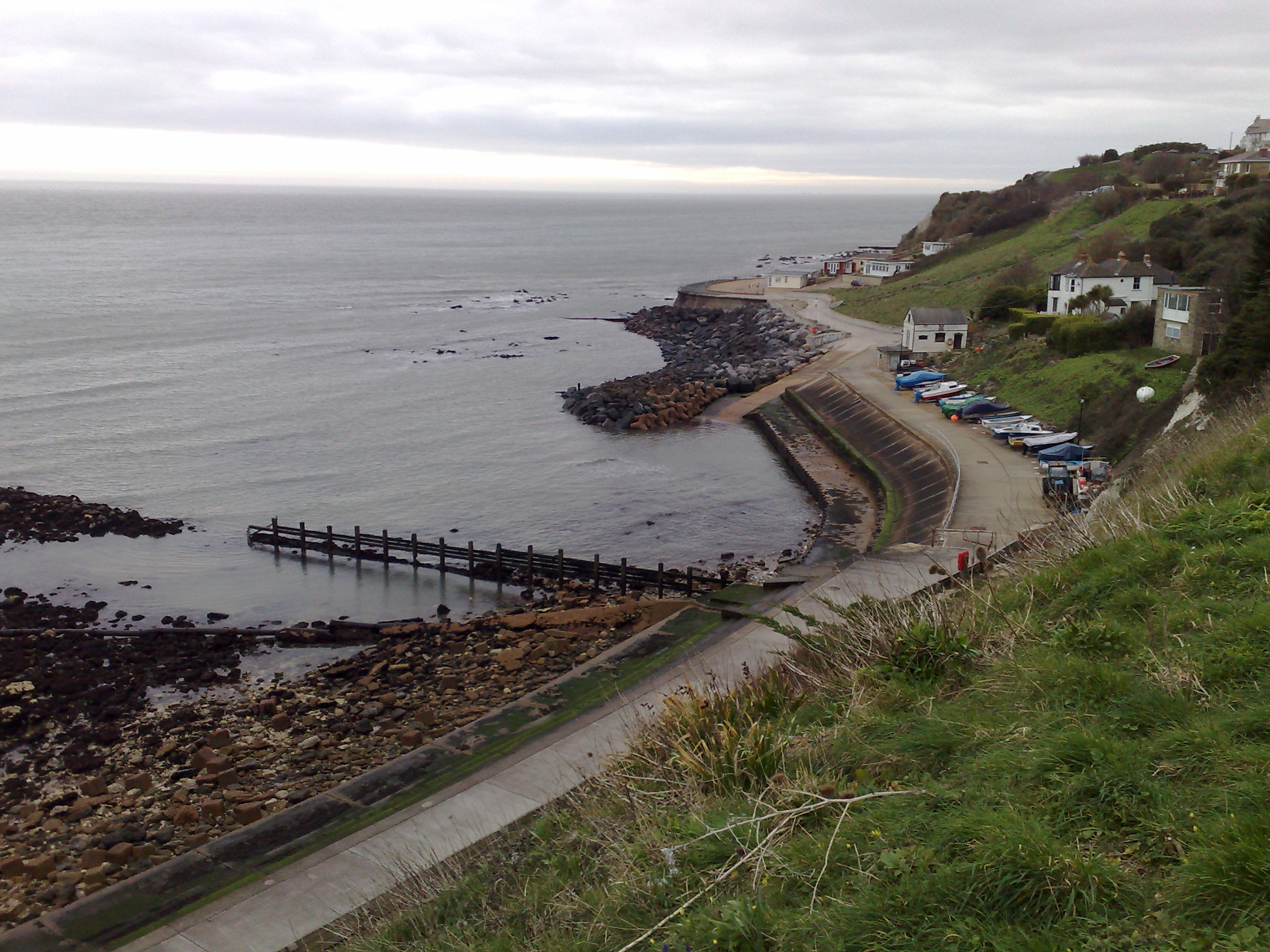
- Wheelers Bay

- Location within the Isle of Wight
- Civil parish: Ventnor
- Ceremonial county: Isle of Wight
- Region: South East
- Country: England
- Sovereign state: United Kingdom
- UK Parliament: Isle of Wight East

Wheelers Bay is a small bay on the south-east coast of the Isle of Wight, England. It lies to the east of Ventnor. It faces south-east towards the English Channel, its shoreline is 300 yards (270 m) in length. A 90-yard (82 m) section of the bay, to the side of the slipway, is used as dry-storage for boats; in recent years this has been targeted by thieves. The bay is home to an open-air café known as The Seapot.

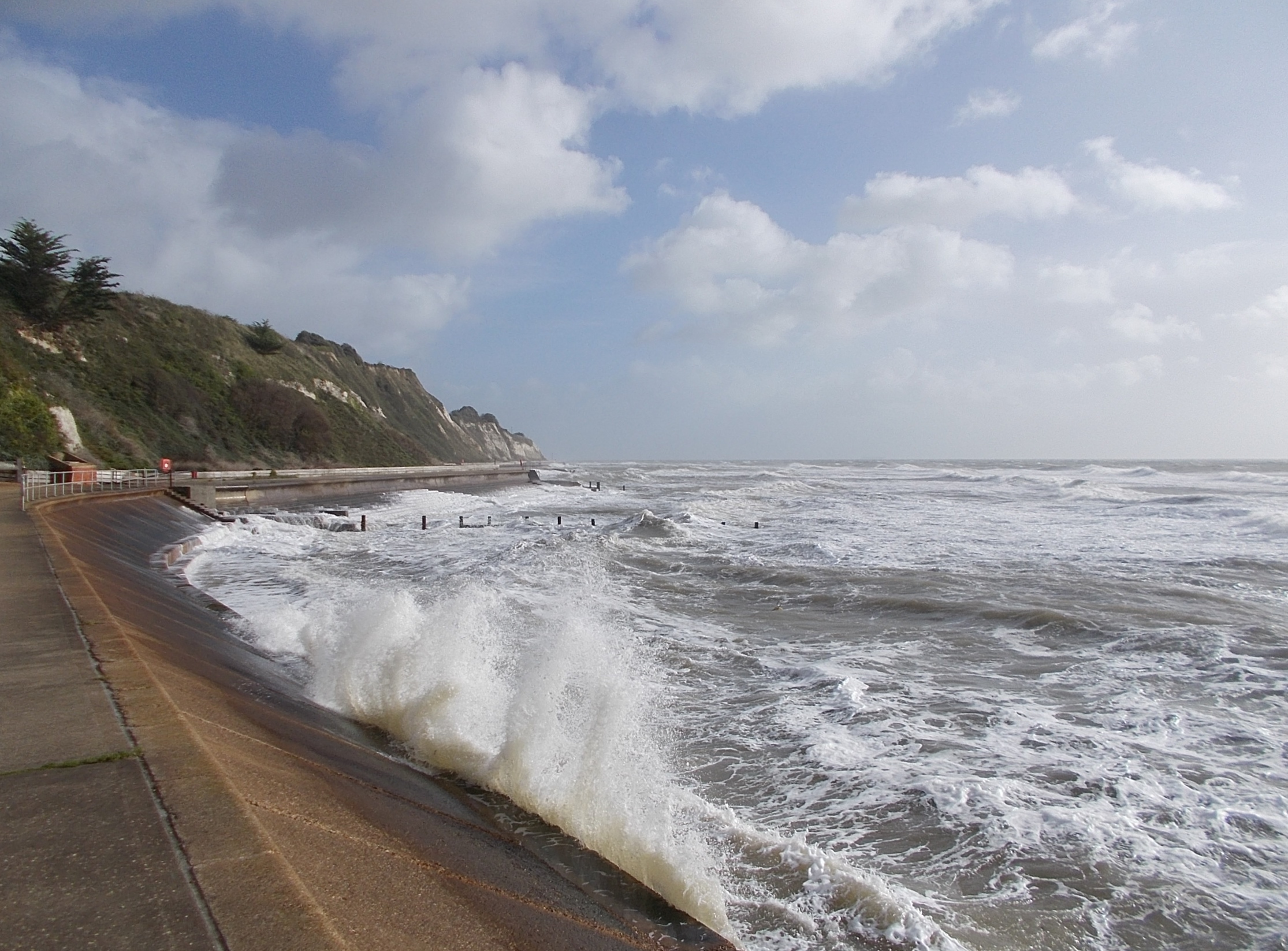
The bay on a rough day

The bay is accessed by a concrete slope from the road above the bay or by walking along the seawall either from Ventnor or Horseshoe Bay. The Isle of Wight Coastal Path runs the length of the bay along the seawall.

== History ==
Leading up to the 19th century, smuggling and wreaking was an island industry in which many families were involved. Wheelers Bay took its name from a notorious Isle of Wight family "the Wheeler's" known for their involvement in smuggling on the isle. In the 1800s Robert Wheeler had logged 70 wrecks, His father James Wheeler was said to saved three souls from the sea when he entered the water tied only to a rope and carried the remaining survivors ashore.

In the 19th century, Wheelers Bay and Horseshoe Bay beaches were used for unloading provisions, particularly coal. Boats would beach at high tide and the cargo off-loaded onto horse-drawn carts. The boats would then be floated off again at the next high tide. The bay is famous for the looting of shipwrecks, where sometimes locals would kill survivors to claim the cargo, many families in the area made their fortunes this way.

In the early 1990s, after a study by the former Department of Environment, the existing sea defences were improved at a cost of £1.6 million, to protect the cliff from erosion. This includes a 15,500 tonnes (15,300 long tons) revetment with an outer layer of rocks and 23,000 tonnes of chalk fill-material.
