= Risga =

Uninhabited Scottish island

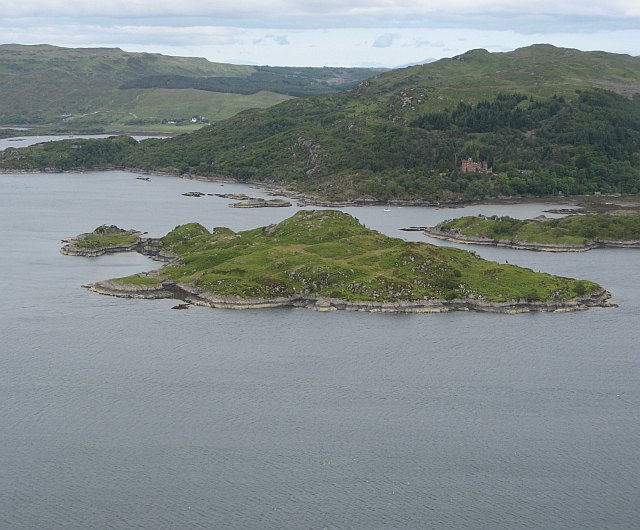
- Risga seen from Càrna

Location
- Risga shown within Highland
- OS grid reference: NM6105760026
- Coordinates: 56.670754°N 5.9016713°W

Physical geography
- Island group: Inner Hebrides
- Area: 12 hectares (0.05 sq mi)
- Highest elevation: 43m

Administration
- Council area: Highland
- Country: Scotland
- Sovereign state: United Kingdom

Demographics
- Population: 0

Risga is an uninhabited island in between Càrna and Oronsay, in the centre of Loch Sunart, about 800 yards (730 m) from the north shore, in the council area of Highland, Scotland. Its area is 12 hectares (30 acres) and its highest elevation is 43 metres (141 ft). In 1950, over 50 pairs of Lesser black-backed gull were recorded. The island is included in the grounds of Glenborrodale Castle and is part of Sunart SSSI. Ross Rock is located about 200 yards (180 m) from Risga. Risga has at least 60 crotagans along the east coast, used for fishing. Risga is a rocky island.

== History ==
The name "Risga" is Norse and includes the Old Norse word for island. In 1920–21 some Mesolithic materials were recovered during the excavation of a kitchen. They are now in the Hunterian Museum, University of Glasgow and Kelvingrove Art Gallery and Museum. There is a shell midden, a scheduled monument that is at least 30 by 10 metres (100 by 30 ft), which is visible as a grass-covered mound. The shell heap is on top of a raised beach, similar to those at Oronsay.
