= Tarbet, Sutherland =

Hamlet in Sutherland, Highland, Scotland

Coordinates: 58°23′23″N 5°8′34″W

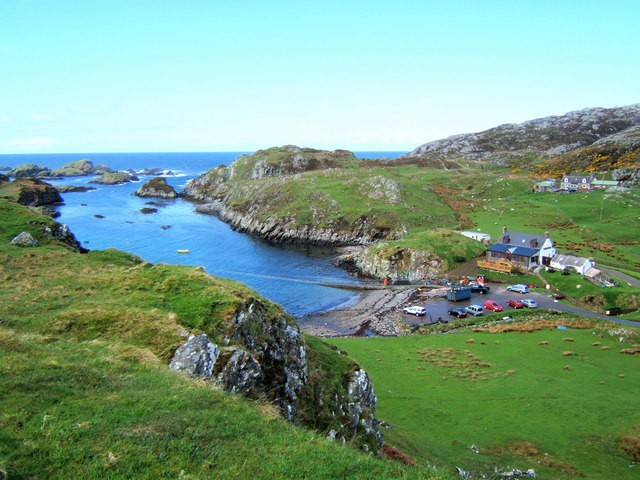
Tarbet

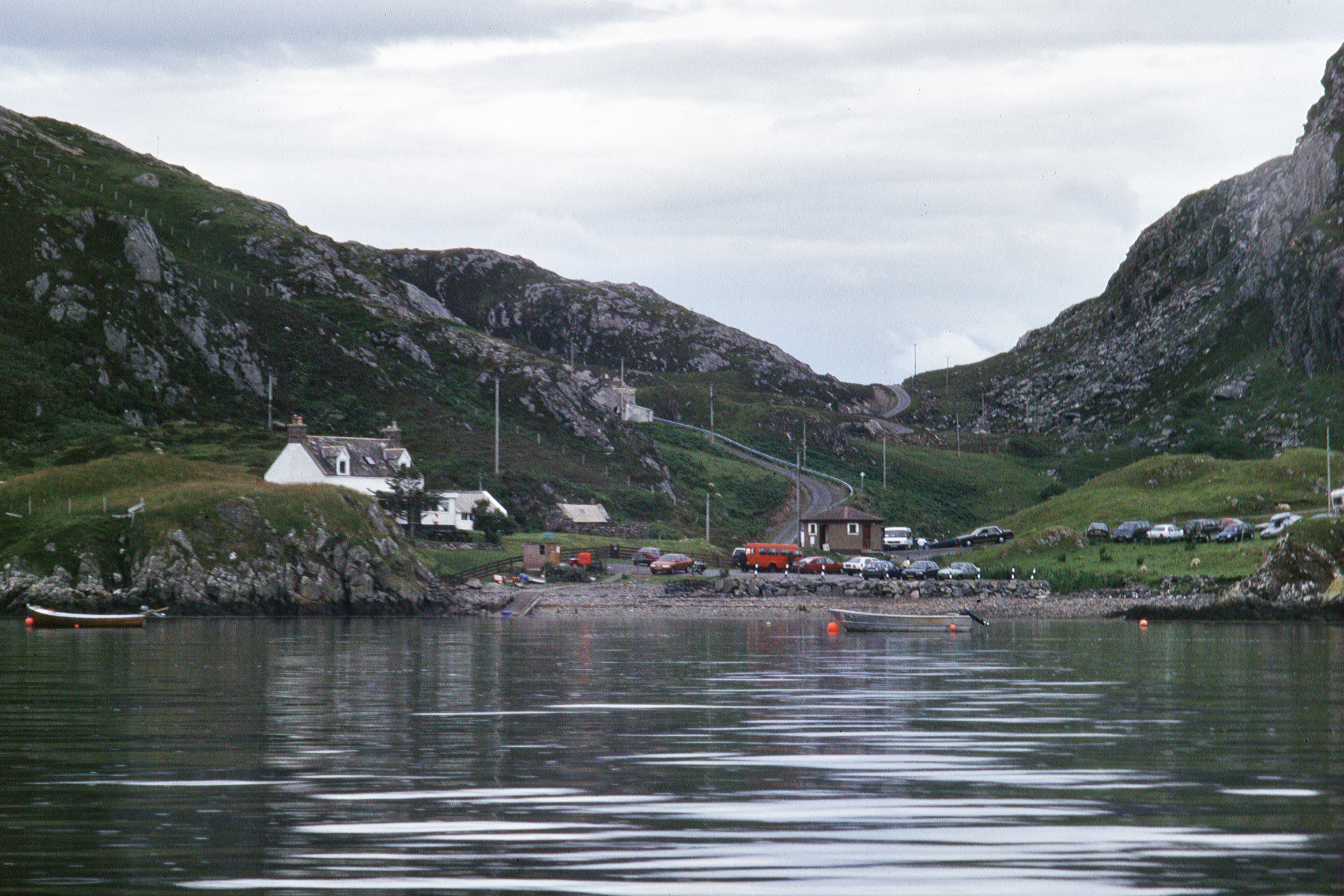
Tarbet seen from the Handa Island ferry in 1997

Tarbet (Scottish Gaelic, An Tairbeart) is a hamlet in Sutherland, on the west coast of Scotland. It is the nearest port of contact to the Scottish Wildlife Trust's national nature reserve of Handa Island, and a small ferry operates between the two. The few buildings include the Shorehouse seafood restaurant, which Rick Stein once visited and gave a good review to, partly because it had taken him so long to reach it. Like neighbouring Handa, Tarbet hosts a good wildlife population, including the true wild form of the rock pigeon, which lives on the cliffs that surround the hamlet. Ravens and buzzards fly over the area and unlikely populations of house sparrows, robins and pied wagtails live near the restaurant. Because it is the only settlement for a large distance around, many power lines bring electricity to it.
