= Cove, Highland =

Coordinates: 57.849°N 5.70028°W

Cove: Scottish Gaelic: An Uamhaidh
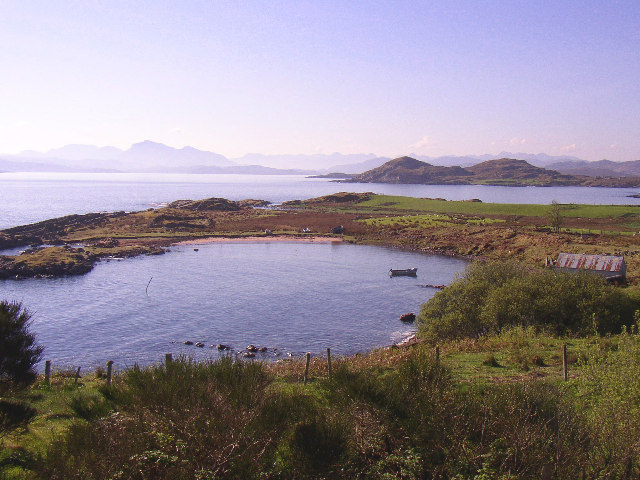
- Natural harbour at crofting community of Cove near mouth of Loch Ewe. The view is south with the Letterewe hills on the horizon.

- Location within the Ross and Cromarty area
- OS grid reference: NG805903
- Council area: Highland
- Country: Scotland
- Sovereign state: United Kingdom
- Post town: Poolewe
- Postcode district: IV22 2
- Police: Scotland
- Fire: Scottish
- Ambulance: Scottish

Cove is a remote hamlet located on the northwestern shore of the sea loch Loch Ewe, and 8 mi (13 km) northwest of Poolewe in Ross-shire, Scottish Highlands and is in the Scottish council area of Highland.

== Geography ==
Cove overlooks the Isle of Ewe on Loch Ewe to the southwest. The nearest major town is Ullapool, from where there are ferry sailings to the Outer Hebrides.
