= Watcombe Bay =

Bay on the Isle of Wight, England

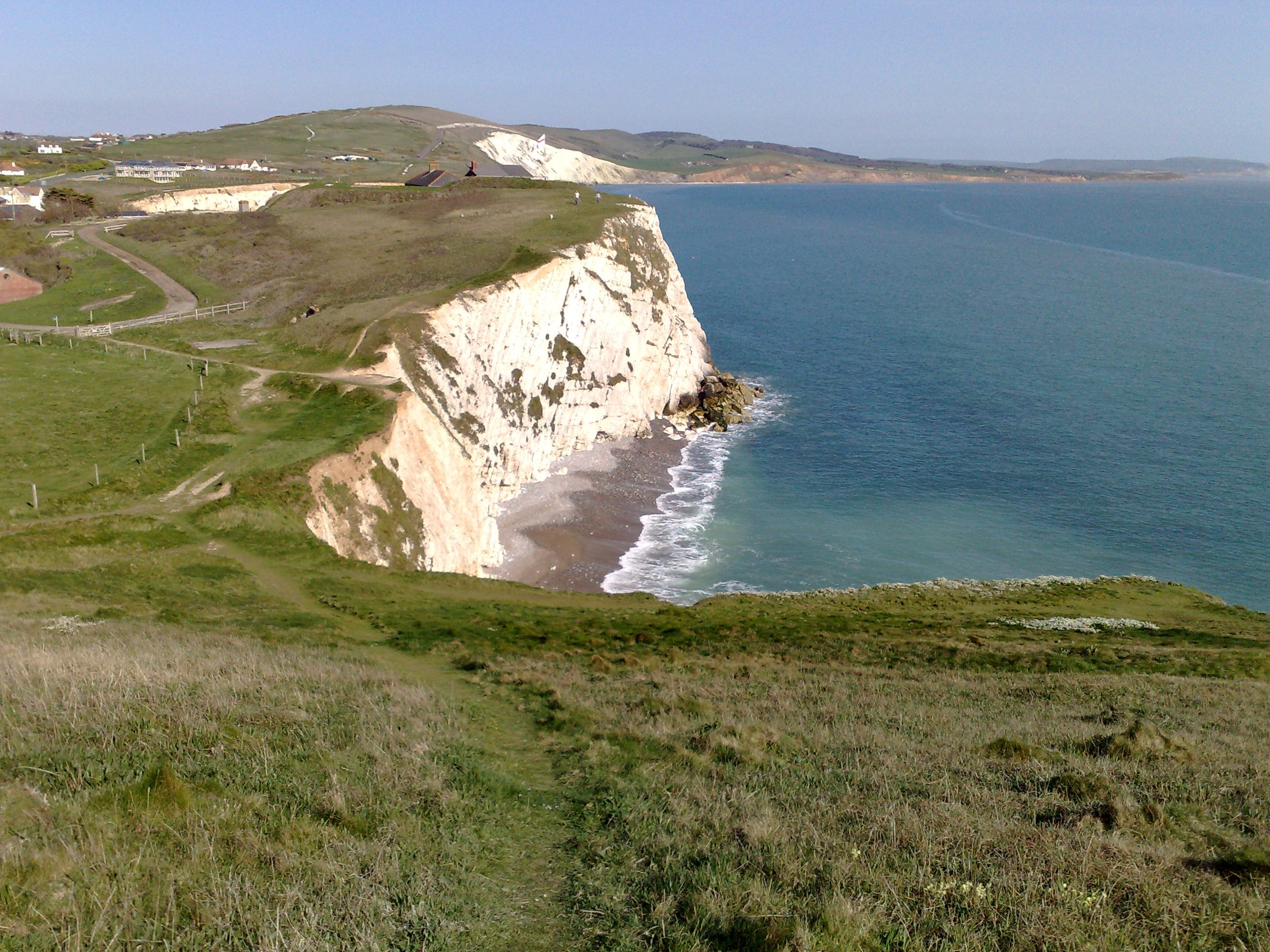
- Watcombe Bay from the cliff top

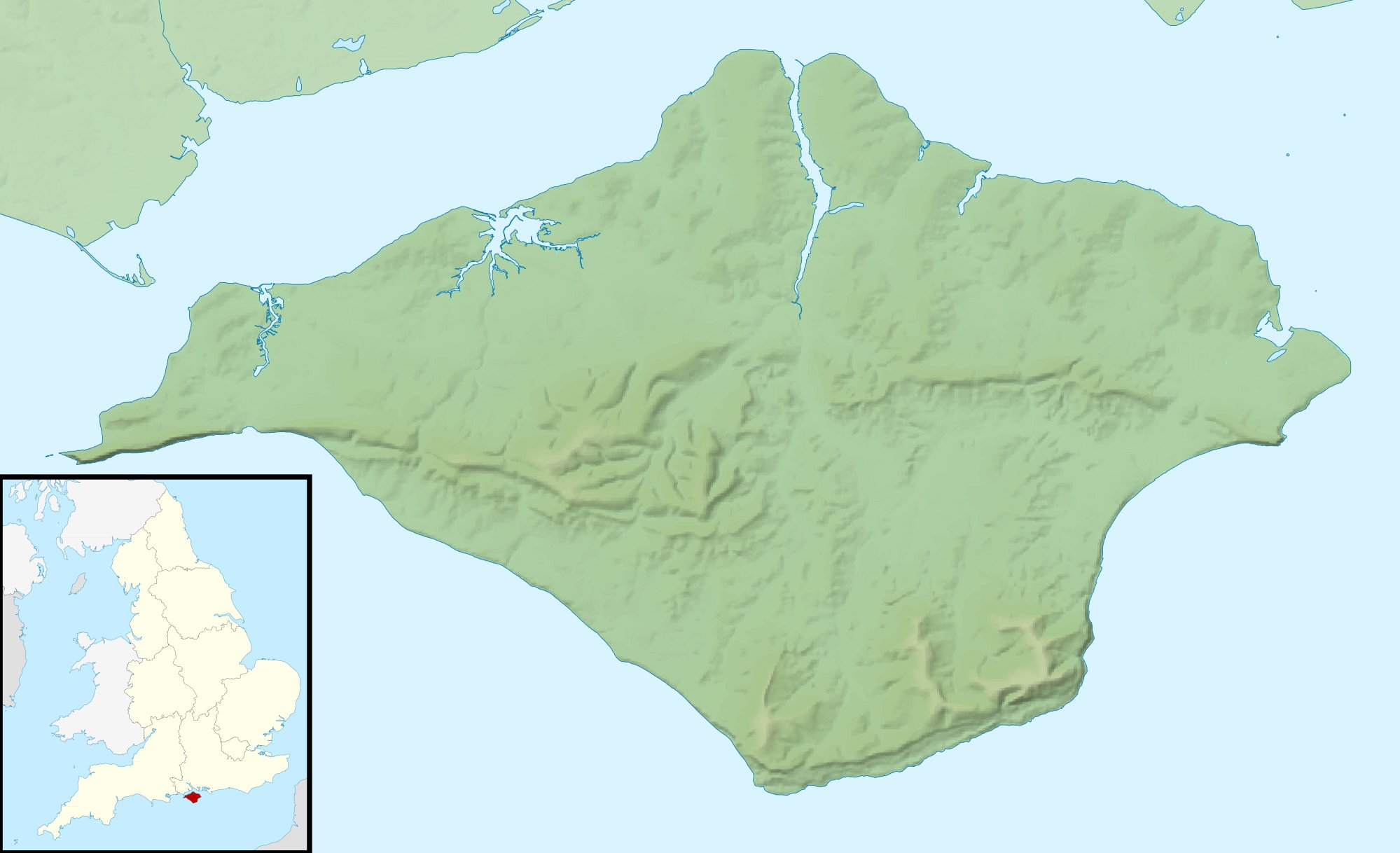
- Location within Isle of Wight
- Coordinates: 50.665°N 1.525°W
- Ocean/sea sources: English Channel

Watcombe Bay is a bay on the south west coast of the Isle of Wight, England. It lies just to the west of Freshwater Bay. It faces south towards the English Channel and is one of the smallest bays of the Isle of Wight. It is cut into the chalk cliff face of Highdown Cliffs. Its shoreline is less than 100m in length. Because of the steep cliffs it is only accessible by foot by scrambling round on the rocks from Freshwater Bay at low tide.

The seabed is a mixture of mud, sand and shells. The beach is predominantly shingle

The bay is best viewed from the cliff top on the Isle of Wight Coastal Path which passes by the bay.

In the mid-19th century, a tunnel and steps led from the clifftop to the beach. A second tunnel, intended to connect the beach to the grounds of Redoubt House above, was commenced in the 1930s by EH Crinage.
