= Corran, Loch Hourn =

Hamlet in the Highlands of Scotland

Coordinates: 57.1264°N 5.55051°W

Corran: Scottish Gaelic: An Corran
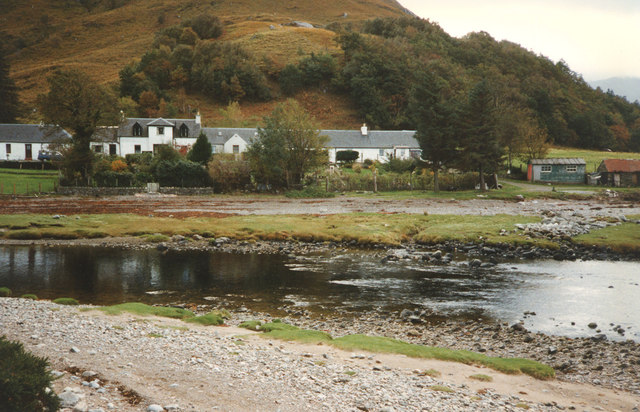
- Cottages at Corran

- Location within the Ross and Cromarty area
- OS grid reference: NG851095
- Council area: Highland
- Country: Scotland
- Sovereign state: United Kingdom
- Post town: Arnisdale
- Postcode district: IV40 8
- Police: Scotland
- Fire: Scottish
- Ambulance: Scottish

Corran (Scottish Gaelic: An Corran) is a hamlet on the northern shore of Loch Hourn, in Lochalsh in Inverness-shire in the Highlands of Scotland. It is situated at the foot of Glen Arnisdale, where the River Arnisdale flows past into Loch Hourn.

Corran is at the end of a minor road, about 1 km past the village of Arnisdale. A footpath continues to Kinloch Hourn.
