= Ardfern =

Village in Argyll and Bute, Scotland

Coordinates: 56°10′52″N 5°32′12″W

Ardfern: Scottish Gaelic: Aird Fheàrna
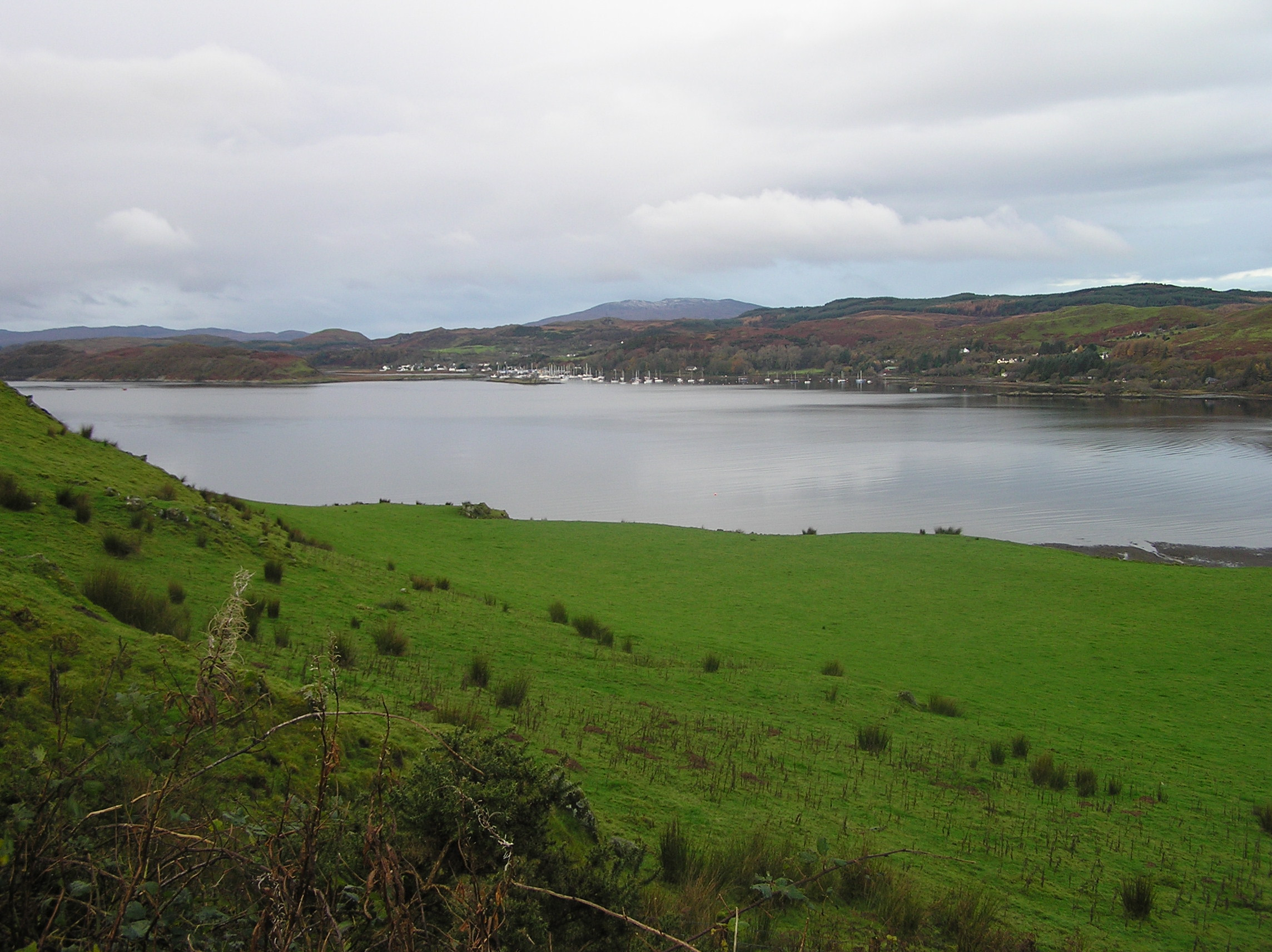
- View of Ardfern, Scotland From the A816 road

- Location within Argyll and Bute
- Population: 400
- OS grid reference: NM806043
- Council area: Argyll and Bute
- Lieutenancy area: Argyll and Bute
- Country: Scotland
- Sovereign state: United Kingdom
- Post town: LOCHGILPHEAD
- Postcode district: PA31
- Police: Scotland
- Fire: Scottish
- Ambulance: Scottish
- UK Parliament: Argyll, Bute and South Lochaber
- Scottish Parliament: Argyll and Bute

Ardfern (Scottish Gaelic: Aird Fheàrna, meaning "the head-land of alder-trees") is a village in Argyll and Bute, Scotland. It lies on the south coast of the Craignish peninsula, facing Loch Craignish.

Ardfern lies between the towns of Oban to the north and Lochgilphead to the south. On the east side of the Craignish Peninsula is Nether Lorne, Argyll. The population is approximately 400.

== Village Services ==
Ardfern has several amenities:

- The Galley of Lorne: The local pub and hotel in Ardfern.
- Ardfern Yacht Centre: Marina, full service yard and chandlery.
- Lucy's Ardfern: The café that opened in early 2020. The café has received notable reviews, including a positive mention in The Times.
- Village Store: The village store, which previously housed a post office, continues to serve the community.

=== Craignish Village Hall ===
The original hall was built in the early 1950s on land gifted by John Lindsay-MacDougall of Lunga. However, by 1997, the old village hall had become inadequate: the kitchen was condemned, and the building was crumbling. A new hall was required, and fundraising efforts began. By 2004, enough money had been raised to begin the project. Due to the delay between 1997 and the completion of fundraising, the cost had risen from £471,000 to £600,000. Fortunately, enough additional money was raised during the construction to finish the project to full specifications, and in 2005, Craignish Village Hall was opened.

== Brief history ==
There is evidence of habitation going back to pre-history. Contemporaries of St. Columba settled by 600 AD and the earliest church on Craignish, Kilvaree, now a ruin, is 12th century or earlier.

After 1778, when most of the peninsula was in the ownership of the Campbells of Craignish, who had been the dominant local clan since the earliest recorded times around 1100, parcels of land were gradually sold off, and by 1850 most of the land was part of two estates; Lunga, purchased by the MacDougalls (of Lunga island), to the north and the Craignish estate to the south end of the peninsula.

This division essentially remains the same today, though in 1983 a part of the Lunga estate was sold off to a developer to create Craobh Haven, a marina and village created in and around a natural harbour on the west side of the peninsula.

Until modern times farming was the main occupation and cattle from the off lying islands, Jura, Scarba, etc., were landed near Craignish point and driven along the peninsula then headed on to mainland markets like Crieff and Falkirkt. Of the three inns that ‘supported’ the drovers only one, dating from the 17th or even 16th century and now called the Galley of Lorne, survives in Ardfern. Farming, together with a busy weaving industry and three mills, carried on during the first part of the twentieth century.

The 19th century saw farming and traditional industry decline and the population fell from 1000 by more than half to 451 in 1881 to a low of 200 in the 1940s. It now stands at more than 400. The current Laird of Lunga, Colin Lindsay-MacDougall, saw that for the community to survive, things must change. To re-vitalise the area, he created a yacht centre at Ardfern to attract the ever-increasing numbers of cruising yachtsmen on the west coast, re-opened and developed the old Inn (the Galley of Lorne), sold housing plots to attract people to the area, encouraged artists of all sorts and the trades-people necessary for a thriving community, to stay on his estate.

Ardfern today has a diverse and growing population. The Yacht Centre, and with the new marina at Craobh Haven, both harbour some of the largest fleet of cruising yachts on the west coast. Tourism and related businesses bring much income to the village, but there are many other small enterprises. Ardfern is an isolated community, 16 miles (26 km) from the nearest small town, Lochgilphead (pop circa 3,000), which is the administrative centre of Argyll & Bute but it is thriving.
