= Ormsary =

Coordinates: 55°53′34″N 5°36′25″W

Ormsary: Scottish Gaelic: Ormsaraidh
- Location within Argyll and Bute
- OS grid reference: NR740724
- Council area: Argyll and Bute
- Lieutenancy area: Argyll and Bute
- Country: Scotland
- Sovereign state: United Kingdom
- Post town: LOCHGILPHEAD
- Postcode district: PA31
- Police: Scotland
- Fire: Scottish
- Ambulance: Scottish
- UK Parliament: Argyll, Bute and South Lochaber
- Scottish Parliament: Argyll and Bute

Ormsary (Scottish Gaelic: Ormsaraidh) is a hamlet in Knapdale, Argyll and Bute, Scotland.
