= Inverie Bay =

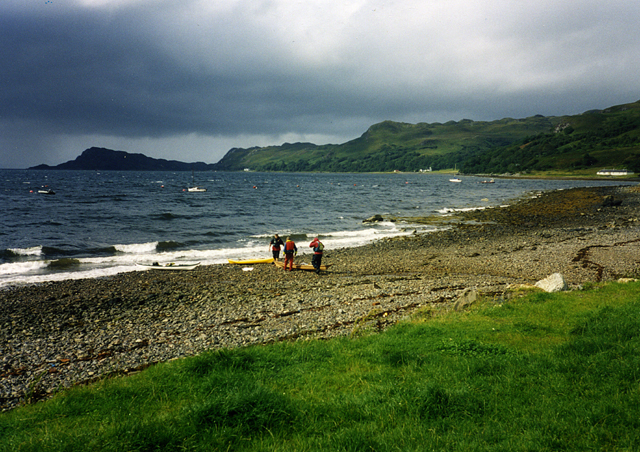
- Inverie Bay

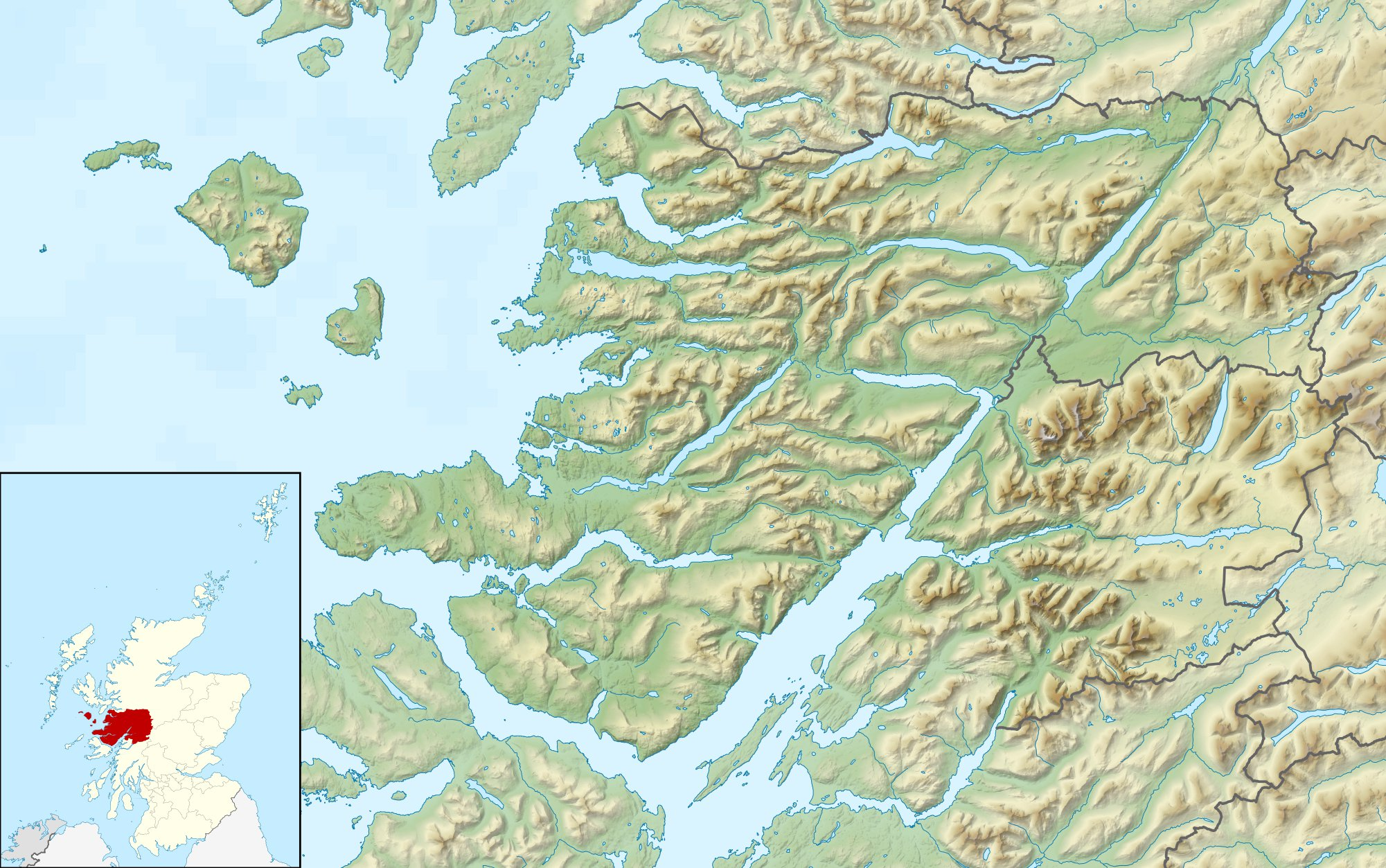
- Location within Lochaber
- Location: NM 7635 9948
- Coordinates: 57.0321°N 5.68734808°W
- Type: sea loch bay
- River sources: Inverie river,
- Ocean/sea sources: Atlantic Ocean
- Islands: Inverie River.

Inverie Bay is a coastal embayment, on a chord of 2.12 miles, on a 207° orientation, on the northwestern coast of the sea loch in Loch Nevis, and is next to the village that takes its name, Inverie, within the Knoydart peninsula.

== Geography ==
Glen Meadail is clearly visible from Inverie Bay, on the right side of the bay.
