= Sandaig Bay =

Bay in Lochaber, Scotland

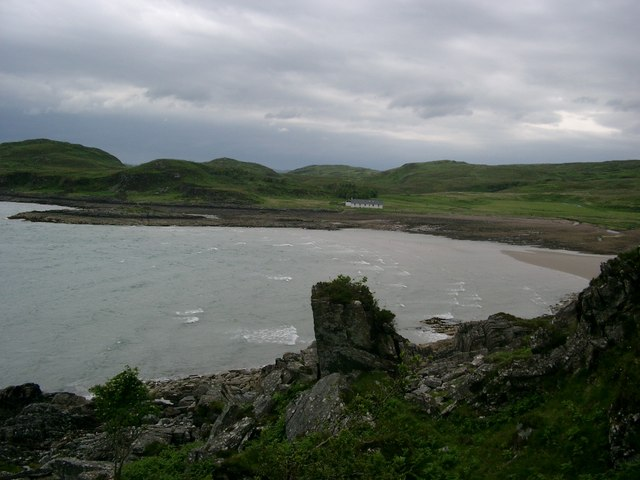
- Sandaig Bay on a wet night.

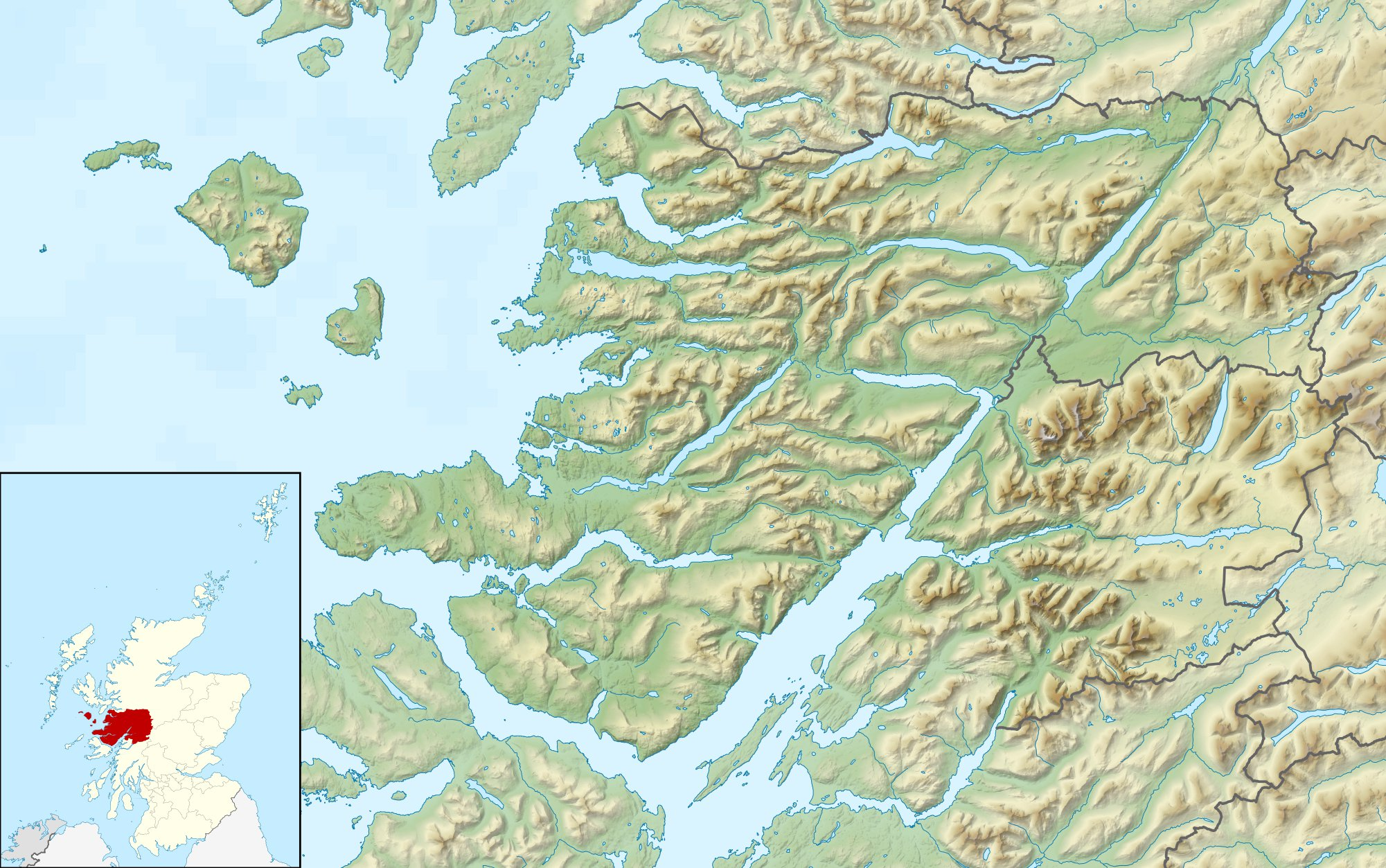
- Location within Lochaber
- Location: NG726016
- Coordinates: 57.045133°N 5.764828°W
- Type: Sea loch bay
- Primary inflows: Sandaig Burn
- Ocean/sea sources: Atlantic Ocean
- Islands: Eilean Mòr, Fraoch Eilean, Sgeir nan Eun

Sandaig Bay is a coastal embayment, on a chord of 2.04 kilometres (1 mile 471 yards), on a 194° orientation, located on the northwestern end of the sea loch, Loch Nevis, facing the Sound of Sleat. The bay is within the western end of the Knoydart peninsula, in the Lochaber district in the historical county of Inverness-shire on the north west coast of Scotland.

== Geography ==
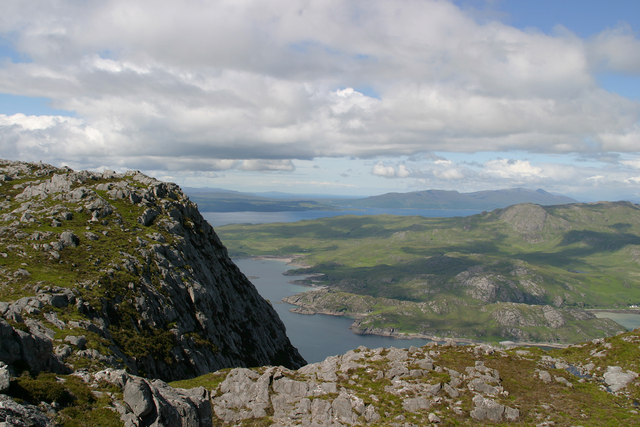
Sgurr an Eilein Ghiubhais near Mallaig. Looking at the cliffs near the top of Sgurr an Eilein Ghiubhais. Sandaig bay and Rubha Raonuill can be seen beyond.

Directly south of Sandaig Bay is the sea Loch Nevis that separates the peninsulae of Knoydart to the north-east and North Morar to the south. The view to the south-west is the Sound of Sleat, on which ferries leaving the port of Mallaig can be seen. Looking south are two peaks in North Morar, Sgurr Eireagoraidh at 548 metres and Sgurr Eilean Ghuibhais at 522 metres.

Sandaig Bay is known by the blown sand that has accumulated at its head. At the head of the Bay in the north corner, is the former Roman Catholic chapel, St Anthony's. Outside the bay lie several rocky islands, the largest of which are Eilean Dearg and Glas Eilean.
