= St Andrews Bay (Fife) =

Bay in Fife, Scotland

Coordinates: 56.366°N 2.753°W

St Andrews Bay is a bay of the North Sea located in Fife, Scotland, named for the nearby Royal burgh of St Andrews.
