= Glenborrodale =

Coordinates: 56.678240°N 5.8980929°W

Glenborrodale: Scottish Gaelic: Gleann Bhorghdail
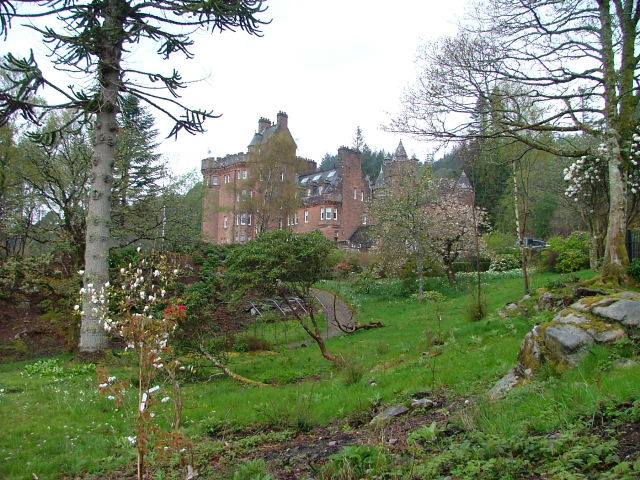
- Glenborrodale Castle

- Location within the Lochaber area
- OS grid reference: NM 6083 6071
- Council area: Highland
- Country: Scotland
- Sovereign state: United Kingdom
- Post town: ACHARACLE
- Postcode district: PH36
- Dialling code: 01972
- Police: Scotland
- Fire: Scottish
- Ambulance: Scottish

Glenborrodale (Scottish Gaelic: Gleann Bhorghdail) is a coastal community on Loch Sunart in the south of the Ardnamurchan peninsula in the Highland area of Scotland.

It gives its name to a Royal Society for the Protection of Birds' reserve in the nearby oakwoods.

In May 1746, following the Jacobite rising of 1745 two French supply ships were attacked off Glenborrodale by three ships of the Royal Navy.

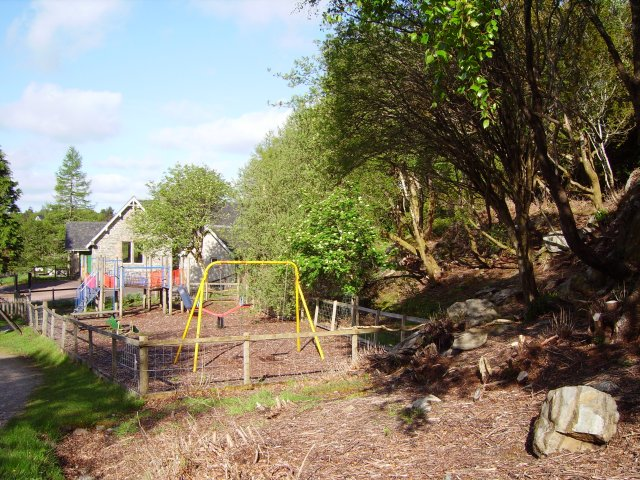
Glenborrodale School

Glenborrodale Castle was built circa 1902 as a guest house by Charles Rudd, the main business associate of Cecil Rhodes. A later owner was Kenneth Mackenzie Clark (1868–1932), of Sudbourne Hall in Suffolk, a wealthy Scottish industrialist whose fortune derived from cotton thread manufacturing conducted by the family firm of Clark & Co Ltd, of Paisley, and the father of the art historian Kenneth Clark, 1st Baron Clark (1903-1983). Clark bought Rudd's 75,000 acre Ardnamurchan estate, together with its two houses built by Rudd, namely Glenborrodale Castle (used for deer stalking) and Sheilbridge (used for salmon fishing). The Clarks used Sheilbridge and let Glenborrodale to "a grim old Scottish financier named Fleming". Another later owner was Jesse Boot, 1st Baron Trent, the proprietor of the Boots chain of chemist shops. The grounds of Glenborrodale include Risga and Eilean an Feidh.

When Glenborrodale castle was listed for sale in 2018, a news report indicated that it has 16 bedrooms and was built in red Dumfriesshire sandstone. It had previously operated as a small hotel and event venue. The property consists of 133 acres (54 hectares). Additional structures on the property included a gate lodge, coach house, gym, boathouse and a jetty.

== Access dispute ==
In 2021, an application was made to the sheriff court to prohibit access to a "historic and popular" footpath between Glenborrodale and Acharacle by the owner of Ardnamurchan Estate. It formed part of a long-standing dispute over restriction of access through a working timber yard on health and safety grounds. Objectors, including Ramblers Scotland and Highland Council, claim that blocking the long-established access route goes against both the Land Reform (Scotland) Act 2003 and the Scottish Outdoor Access Code.
