= Irvine Bay =

Bay in the West of Scotland

Coordinates: 55.597°N 4.716°W

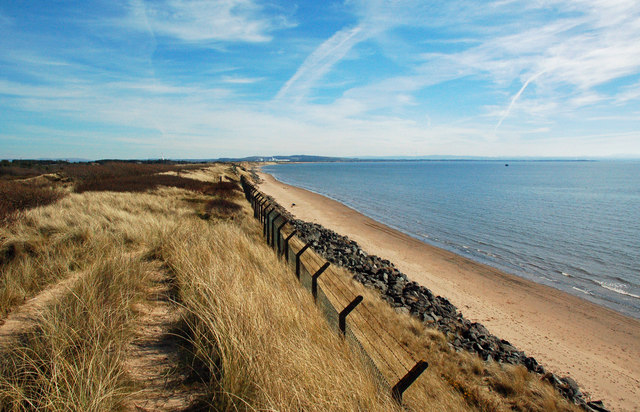
Dunes and Beach at Ardeer, a small part of the huge Irvine Bay

Irvine Bay is on the eastern shore of the Firth of Clyde, on the coast of North Ayrshire in the West of Scotland. The area is famous for its long sweeping sandy beaches and views across to the Island of Arran. In fact, Irvine Bay itself is a 14-mile stretch of sandy coastline with a range of leisure facilities, including good access to golf and sailing facilities.

Irvine, North Ayrshire is a new town towards the centre of the bay and is the centre for North Ayrshire local authority.

To the north lie Saltcoats, Stevenston and Ardrossan, often known as the three towns.

Ardrossan is the main ferry port for travelling to the Isle of Arran. Around 700,000 visitors pass through the town each year on their way to one of Scotland's popular holiday spots.

Inland is Kilwinning, an ancient Abbey town.

The Irvine Bay Regeneration initiative is improving the town centres, creating better business accommodation and attempting to reconnect communities with the sea.

The area has suffered from the gradual decline of local manufacturing industries which Irvine Bay Regeneration Company is attempting to reverse.

To the south is the small town of Troon, a popular golfing centre. Troon is outside the Irvine Bay regeneration area.
