= Thornyhive Bay =

Embayment along the North Sea coast in Aberdeenshire, Scotland

Coordinates: 56.9329°N 2.1991°W

Thornyhive Bay is an embayment along the North Sea coast in Aberdeenshire, Scotland. This bay is situated approximately 2.5 miles south of the town of Stonehaven and approximately 2.5 miles north of the Fowlsheugh Nature Reserve. The steep cliffs afford sightings of certain seabirds.

== See also ==
- Dunnottar Castle
- Trelung Ness
