= Achahoish =

Village in Argyll and Bute, Scotland

Coordinates: 55°56′22″N 5°32′50″W

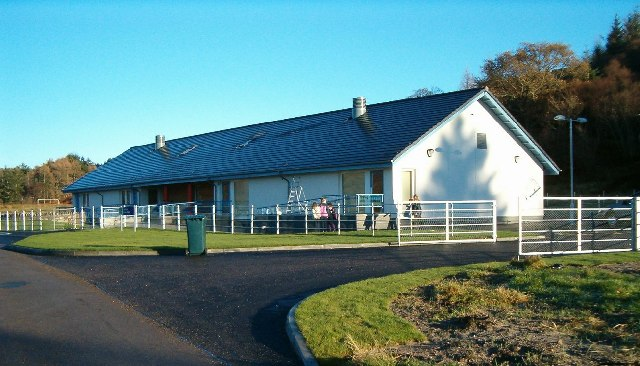
The new Achahoish Primary School

Achahoish (Scottish Gaelic: Achadh a’ Chòis) is a village on the west coast of Knapdale in the Scottish council area of Argyll and Bute. In 1882, Wilson's The Gazetter of Scotland described Achahoish as a "...hamlet at the head of Loch Killisport. It has a post office...".

Achahoish recently benefited from the government's PPP funding and received a new primary school with two classrooms catering to the 20 local children from the small villages and hamlets in the area. The school opened in the summer of 2005.
