= Asknish Bay =

Bay on the west coast of Scotland

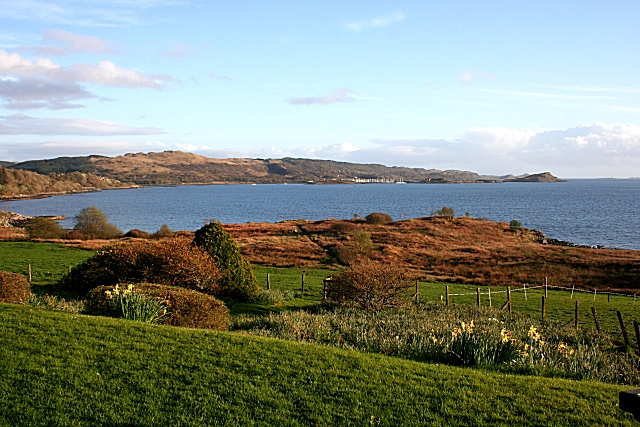
- Asknish Bay. The view across Asknish Bay from Loch Melfort Hotel. The white patch at the far side of the bay is the masts of the yachts moored in the marina at Craobh Haven

- Location within Argyll and Bute
- Location: Argyll and Bute, Scotland
- Coordinates: 56°13′55.0740″N 5°33′19.7712″W
- Ocean/sea sources: Atlantic Ocean
- Basin countries: Scotland
- Max. length: 1.26 km (0.78 mi)
- Max. width: 0.4 km (0.25 mi)

Asknish Bay is a small, remote, southwest-facing coastal embayment, located next to the small settlement of Arduaine within Argyll and Bute, Scotland. To the east of the bay lies Arduaine Point (Gael: Rudh' Arduaine), which makes up the west most southern coast of Loch Melfort to the north. It is 12 miles (20 km) south southwest of large west coast town of Oban.

== Settlements ==
The main A816 road from Oban to Lochgilphead passes the bay. Kilmelford is the biggest village to the immediate North, with Kilmartin the closest largest village to the south.

== Geography ==
To the north of the bay on the small peninsula containing Arduaine Point, meaning Green Prometary is the Arduaine Gardens, which occupy most of the headland and are owned by the National Trust for Scotland and is known for the large number of Rhododendron species contained in the garden, some 229, planted by the tea baron, Arthur Campbell. To the west of the bay is the island of Shuna one of the Slate Islands, with the larger island of Luing separated by the Shuna Sound. The small rocky island of Eilean Creagach is located several hundred feet from the entrance the bay.
