= Kilbride Bay =

Bay in Argyll and Bute, Scotland

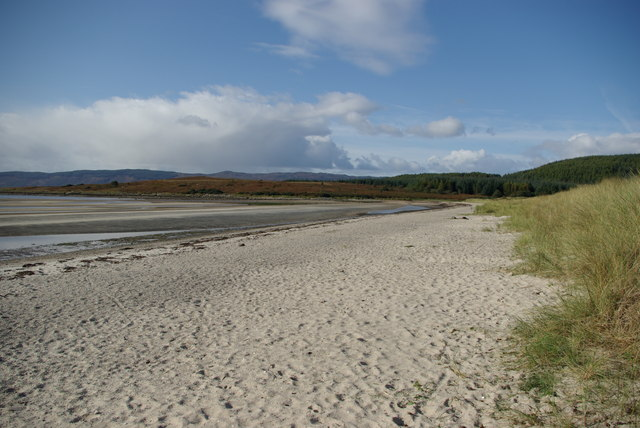
- Kilbride Bay pictured in 2008
- Coordinates: 55°50′53″N 5°15′36″W

Kilbride Bay (also known as Ostel Bay, Ostell Bay or Bàgh Osde) is a bay and beach in Argyll and Bute, Scotland. It is situated in the far south-west of the Cowal peninsula where Loch Fyne meets the Firth of Clyde. The nearest settlements are Kames, 4 miles (6.4 km) to the north, and Portavadie, 5 miles (8.0 km) to the west. Ardlamont Point, the southern-most point in Cowal, is 2.5 miles (4.0 km) to the south-east.

The beach at Kilbride Bay is sandy and faces due south towards the Isle of Arran. The nearest road access is at Kilbride Farm, 1 mile (1.6 km) to the north, where there is an (often full) layby and a path to the beach.
