= Airds Bay =

Bay on the west coast of Scotland

Coordinates: 56°32′49″N 5°24′43″W

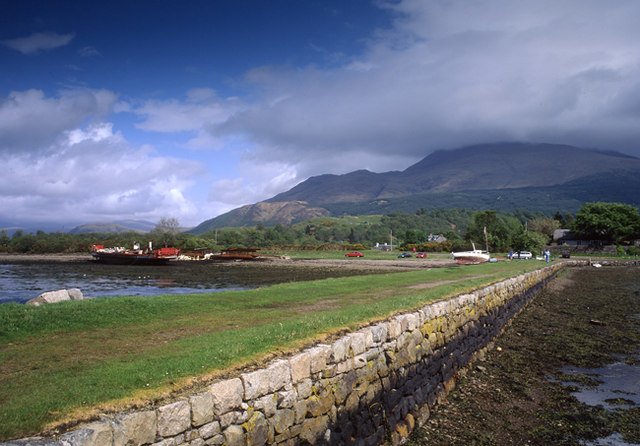
Airds Bay near Taynuilt

Airds Bay is a small bay south-west of Port Appin on the west coast of Scotland. It is located at the south-western end of Appin in Argyll and Bute, forming an inlet north of the mouth of Loch Creran. The bay looks out over the Lynn of Lorn, between Loch Linnhe and Loch Creran. Lorne MacLaine Campbell, recipient of the Victoria Cross, was from Airds.
