= Kilfinan =

Hamlet in Argyll and Bute, Scotland

Coordinates: 55.957654°N 5.3111551°W

Kilfinan: Scottish Gaelic: Cill Fhionain
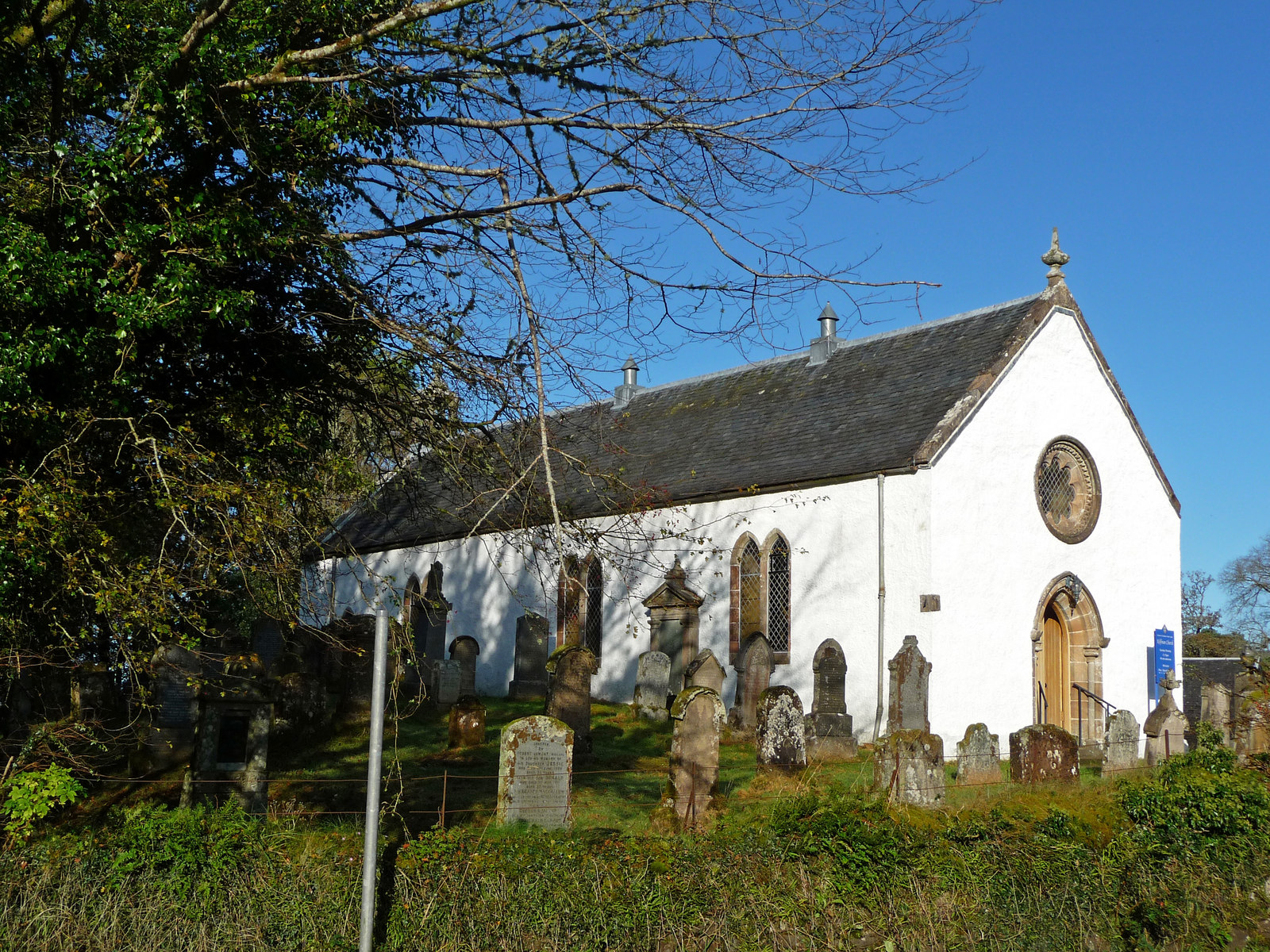
- Kilfinan Parish Church

- Location within Argyll and Bute
- OS grid reference: NR 93400 78800
- Council area: Argyll and Bute
- Lieutenancy area: Argyll and Bute
- Country: Scotland
- Sovereign state: United Kingdom
- Post town: TIGHNABRUAICH
- Postcode district: PA21
- Dialling code: 01369
- UK Parliament: Argyll, Bute and South Lochaber
- Scottish Parliament: Argyll and Bute

Kilfinan is a hamlet in Argyll and Bute, Scotland in the historic parish of the same name. Located in the Cowal Peninsula on the eastern side of Loch Fyne, the hamlet is 4 miles (6.4 km) northwest of the village of Tighnabruaich. Kilfinan is the burial place of the clan chiefs of the Lamonts, in the 13th-century Kilfinan Parish Church.

The hamlet includes the Kilfinan Hotel, originally a coaching inn, which is over 300 years old. The ruins of Castle MacEwen lie on the coast, about 2 kilometres (1.2 mi) to the north-west of Kilfinan.

== Church of Saint Finan ==
The parish church of Saint Finan dates from the 13th century. The earliest mentions are in the forms of grants made between 1231 and 1241 to the Cluniac Monks of Paisley Abbey, Paisley.

=== Interior ===
In 1633 the Lamont North Aisle was added by Sir Coll Lamont, whose initials "S/CL" are carved into the crowstepped north gable, and on the lintel of the west doorway, along with those of his wife, "D/BS", Dame Barbara Semple.

In 2015 and 2016, during restoration, stones were removed from the Lamont Vault and the floor lowered. Two 17th-century lead coffins were discovered, which may hold the remains of Sir Coll and Dame Barbara. The Upper Lamont Aisle is now a gallery. The vault has among the best collections of ancient burial stones in the West of Scotland, including the Inveryne Stone.

=== Exterior ===
In 1759 the bird-cage belfry was added at the west end of the church. The bell is dated 1832.

=== Swallows ===
Swallows nest at the church. For many years the rose window was broken and the swallows flew in to build their nests. Now the window is repaired visitors are reminded to leave the door open to give the swallows access.

=== Churchyard ===
The monument inscriptions of the graveyard have been fully catalogued. Most of the monuments in the churchyard are from the 18th and 19th centuries. In the 20th century burials in the parish took place at the (now disused) Kilbride church, on the west side of the Ardlamont peninsula, and more recently at the cemetery in Millhouse. The graveyard also includes the McFarlane Vault, to the west of the church, and the Rankin Vault, on the south side of the burn.

== Transport ==
Kilfinan is situated on the B8000 road that follows the south and east coast of the Cowal peninsular from Tighnabruaich to the head of Loch Fyne. Millhouse lies some 9 kilometres (5.6 mi) to the south along this road, whilst Otter Ferry is about 6 kilometres (3.7 mi) to the north. Dunoon is some 42 kilometres (26 mi) away via Otter Ferry. The Kintyre peninsula can be reached by a car ferry across Loch Fyne from Portavadie (near Millhouse) to Tarbert.

== Gallery ==
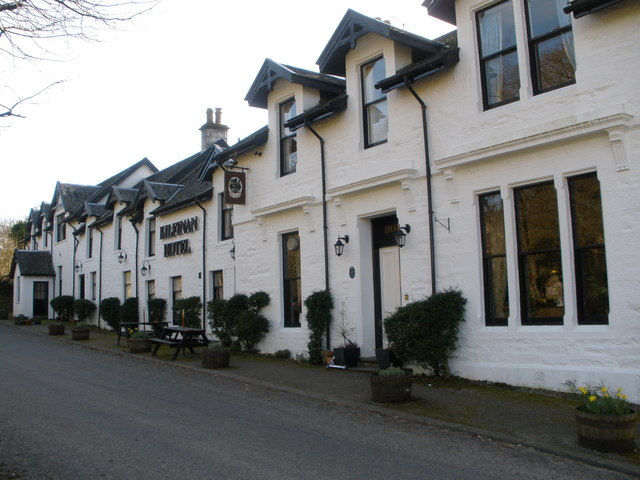
Kilfinan Hotel

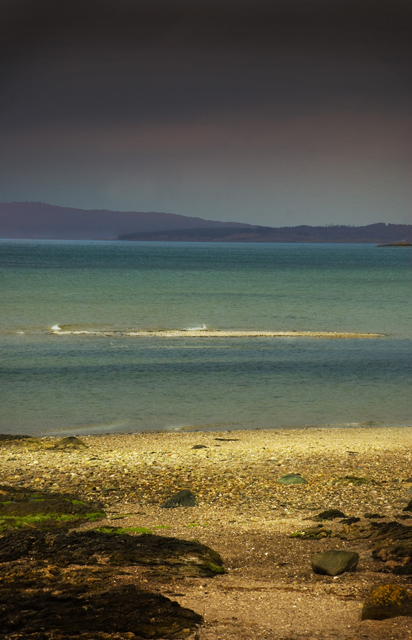
Kilfinan Bay

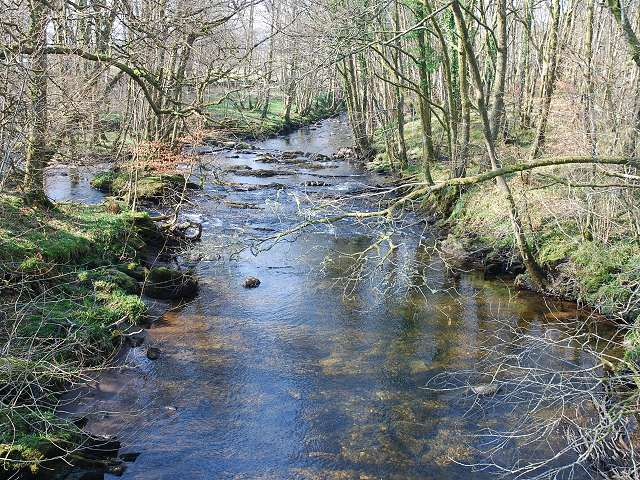
Kilfinan Burn
