= Stormie Mills =

Australian street artist (born 1969)

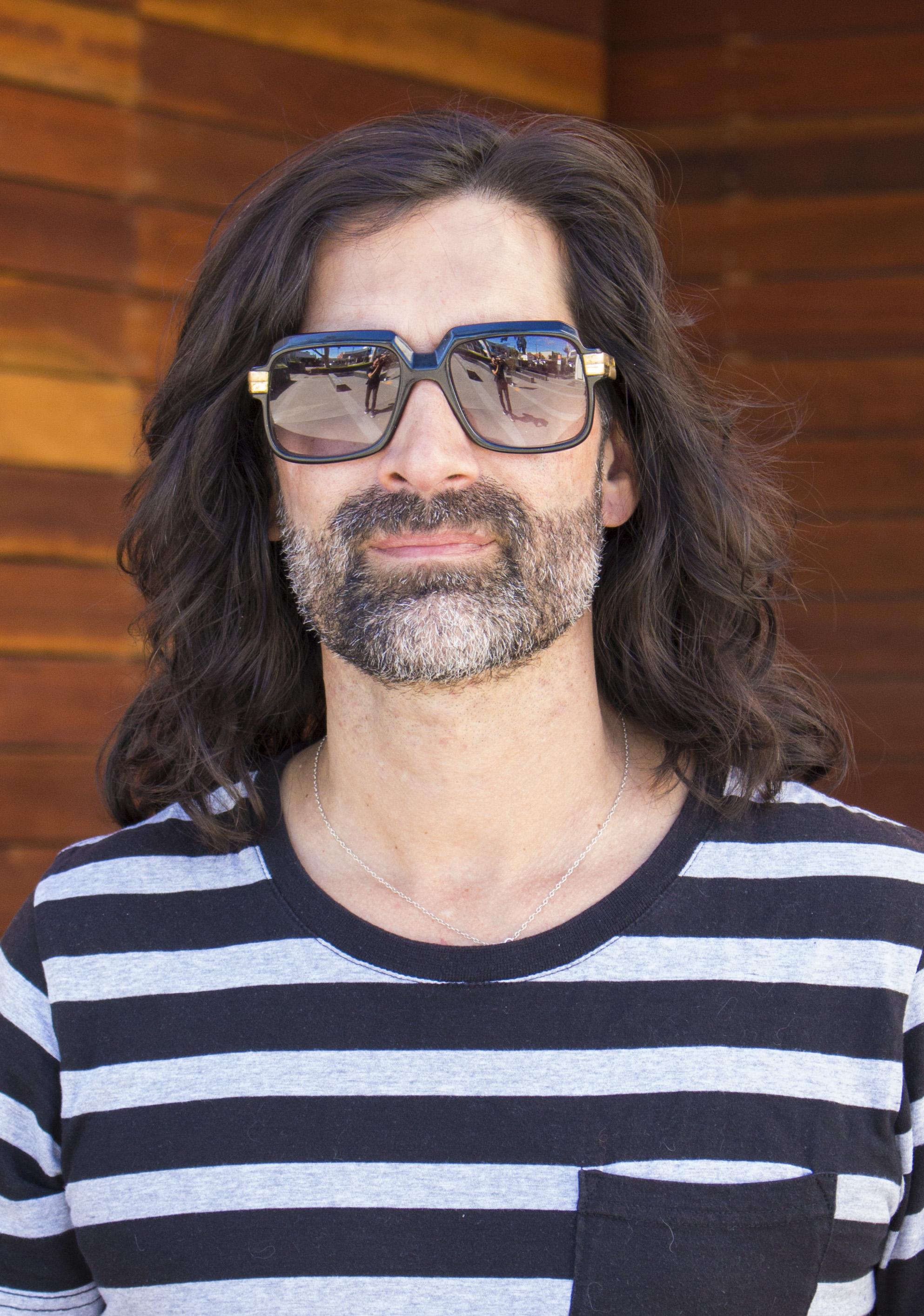
- Mills in 2015
- Born: 1969 (age 56–57); Colwyn Bay, Wales, UK
- Style: Street art
- Spouse: Melissa Lekias (married 2007–present)
- Website: stormiemills.com

Stormie Mills (born 1969) is a street/visual artist operating out of Perth, Western Australia. Mills' portfolio has been published in two books, Proximamente (2008) and Dwi Yma (2013).

== Life and career ==
Mills was born in 1969 in Colwyn Bay, a coastal town in northern Wales, and moved with his brothers Barnaby and Oliver and his parents Gani and Christopher to Perth, Western Australia when he was three. In 1984 Mills discovered spray-paint and painting in the streets, and at 16 years of age he travelled back to Wales to live with his grandmother before visiting New York in 1986. During that time he also travelled to London.

When I went to New York in 1986, I met a bunch of guys that were subway painters and I saw the work of Jenny Holzer and John Fekner. These people were the godfathers of street art. They had a movement, and I was so impressed by them that it certainly changed the way I was thinking and steered my work into another direction.

— Stormie Mills

Mills returned to Perth just before his 21st birthday. In 1999 he held his first solo exhibition in Perth at Jacksue Gallery.

In 2002 he achieved a Commendation Award in the "City of Perth Invitational Art Award". He has been commissioned to create works in Los Angeles and London and in 2002 was invited to create large scale murals across Greece in preparation for the Olympics achieving international acclaim for his work.

In 2003 he was invited to produce a limited edition toy, Toy2R, which was retailed in Tokyo and New York. He was also invited to produce work for a group show at the Adicolor Studios in Berlin and was invited to participate in group shows in Tokyo and Taiwan with the Seventh Letter in October 2006.

In October 2004 Mills was invited to participate in a show in London to launch the Thames and Hudson publication, Graffiti World, where he was invited as a guest speaker at the Institute of Contemporary Arts, London.

In 2009, together with Timid, Remi/Rough, System, Juice 126, Derm and Burial, Mills travelled to the west coast of Scotland to transform an abandoned village, Polphail near Portavadie. Over four days the artists decorated the grey walls of the village. A short film, The Ghost Village, was made documenting the project and was screened at the London Film Festival. In the same year his work was exhibited as part of Installation 5, presented by SCION LA at the annual Art Basel exhibition in Miami Beach, Florida, where he has been invited back twice.

The year 2012 saw Mills become the first Australian artist to create a street art suite at the Art Series Hotel Group's Cullen Hotel in Prahran Melbourne, joining international practitioners D*Face, Swoon and Blek le Rat. Mills also presented at the agIdeas conference and in 2015 was subsequently invited by Conference Creator Ken Cato to be one of 25 artists to create an artwork to celebrate the conference's 25-year history.

In July 2013 Mills was invited to paint works for Art Whino's Richmond Mural Project in Virginia, USA. Mills contributed a total of nine murals. The same year he created a series of four metre tall pink bunny figurines for the annual Brisbane Festival, which were reimagined by Mills the following year for the 2014 Brisbane Festival. In 2015 the Bunnies appeared as part of the Perth Fringe Festival making appearances in and around the City, as well as at the international Sculptures By The Sea exhibition where Mills was awarded the People’s Choice Prize as voted by the public.

In 2014 and 2015 Mills painted large scale murals for the Re.Discover project in Bunbury as well as Form's #Public Street Art Festival, speaking at the inaugural #Public Symposium.

In July 2026, Mills held his first solo art exhibition in Australia at the Art Gallery of Western Australia, showcasing both old and new creations.

== Personal life ==
In 2007 Mills married Melissa Lekias, a public relations professional, in Oaxaca, Mexico.

== Publications ==
- Mills, Stormie (2008). Proximamente. Magenta Group. ISBN 978-0-9804642-0-7.
- Mills, Stormie (2013). DWI YMA. Magenta Group.
