= Clan Ewen of Otter =

Scottish clan

- Clann Eóghain na h-Oitrich

Profile
- District: Cowal
- Clan Ewen of Otter no longer has a chief, and is an armigerous clan
- Historic seat: Cnoc Mhic Eoghain; Caisteall Mhic Eoghain
- Last Chief: Swene Mac Ewen
- Died: 1493
Allied clans
Clan Lamont
Clan MacLachlan
Clan MacSween
Rival clans
Clan Campbell

Clan Ewen of Otter (Scottish Gaelic: Clann Eóghain na h-Oitrich) was a Scottish clan which once controlled the area around Kilfinan in Argyll, Scotland.

== Origin ==
Clan Ewen of Otter claimed descent from Donnsleibhe, who was said to be a descendant of an Irish prince of the O'Neill dynasty named Ánrothán Ua Néill, who left Ireland for Kintyre in the 11th century. He was a son of Áed, son of Flaithbertach Ua Néill, King of Ailech and Cenél nEógain, died 1036. There are several other Argyll clans which claim a descent from this prince—Clan Lamont, Clan Maclachlan, Clan MacNeil of Barra, and also the MacSweens who left Scotland to settle in Ireland in the 14th century. From this descent, these clans claim a further descent from the legendary Niall Noigíallach, High King of Ireland, who lived from the mid 4th century to the early 5th century.

The only genealogy to survive regarding Clan Ewen of Otter, is the so-called MS 1467, now held in the National Library of Scotland. The Gaelic manuscript was written in 1467 and contains the genealogies of many Scottish clans. Unfortunately the MacEwen genealogy is practically unreadable in places. The MS 1467 was uncovered by W. F. Skene in the early 19th century, who transcribed and translated it. The following is his translated transcription for the MacEwens of Otter:

Walter son of, John son of, Ewen son of, Gillespic son of, --- son of, --- son of, Saveran son of, Dunslebhe son of, Aeda Alain called Buirche son of, Anradam son of, Flaherty.

— Celtic Scotland

Contradicting Skene's transcription (above), Niall Campbell, 10th Duke of Argyll, considered the MacEwens of Otter as a branch of the MacSweens, and thus descended from Dugald, son of Suibne (who is thought to have left his name to one of the oldest stone castles in Scotland—Castle Sween). Another origin suggested by earlier writers posited descent from the 13th-century Ewen Mac Dunslebhe, whose brother Fearchar is the ancestor of Clan Lamont.

However, there is no obvious reason to doubt that the clan took its name from the Ewen listed in the genealogy of MS1467 above. This would date the foundation of the Clan Ewen of Otter to the first half of the fourteenth century.

== History ==
The chiefs of the clan lived at Otter, on Loch Fyne. Their castle, 'MacEwen Castle' was located on the rocky shore of the loch, near Kilfinan. Ruins of the castle are still present in the area.

In March 1432, Swene MacEwen resigned his title to the Barony of Otter to his feudal lord, King James. The king restored Swene to his title, but designated Gillespie Campbell (heir to Duncan Campbell of Lochow) as heir to the Barony of Otter. When Swene died in 1493, the barony passed into the hands of the Campbells.

Since the death of Swene the line of chiefs of the MacEwens of Otter has been untraced, however according to tradition, a MacEwen clan arrived in the earldom of Lennox "under a chieftain of their own" during the fifteenth century; the same tradition, which refers to a new banner, suggests that the clan chief was granted arms by Mary Queen of Scots at some time before her defeat at The Battle of Langside in 1568.

== Castles ==
- Castle MacEwen, also known as Castle Ewen and Caisteal Mhic Eoghainn, is a mile north-west of Kilfinan, in the Cowal Peninsula, Argyll. It was the stronghold of the MacEwens of Otter. The old castle reused the site of an Iron Age dun, and is today marked by a cairn. The castle was excavated in the 1960s.
- Ballimore which was three miles north east of Kilfinan, Cowal Peninsula, Argyll was also held by the MacEwens of Otter and was lost at the same time as Castle MacEwen. There is now a steep sided motte and on the summit are two burial enclosures of the Campbells of Otter that date from the nineteenth century.

== See also ==
- Clan Ewing
