= Otter Ferry =

Coordinates: 56.007712°N 5.3218587°W

Otter Ferry: Scottish Gaelic: An Oitir
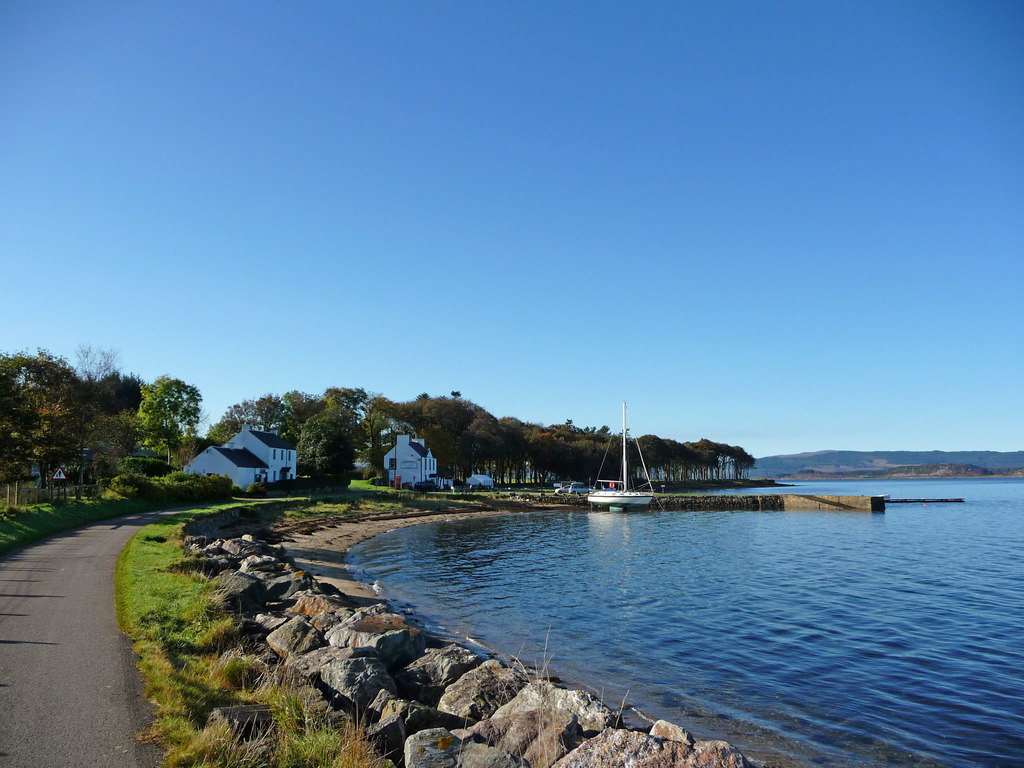
- Waterfront at Otter Ferry

- Location within Argyll and Bute
- OS grid reference: NR 93000 84400
- Council area: Argyll and Bute
- Lieutenancy area: Argyll and Bute
- Country: Scotland
- Sovereign state: United Kingdom
- Post town: DUNOON, ARGYLL
- Postcode district: PA21
- Dialling code: 01700
- UK Parliament: Argyll, Bute and South Lochaber
- Scottish Parliament: Argyll and Bute

Otter Ferry (Scottish Gaelic: An Oitir) is a settlement on the Cowal Peninsula, in Argyll and Bute, west of Scotland. The settlement was formerly the site of, and takes its name from, a ferry across Loch Fyne.

The category B listed Ballimore House lies about 1 kilometre (0.62 mi) to the south of Otter Ferry. The Oystercatcher restaurant and pub in Otter Ferry belongs to the Ballimore estate.

== Transport ==
Otter Ferry is situated on the B8000 road that follows the south and east coast of the Cowal peninsular from Tighnabruaich to the head of Loch Fyne. Kilfinan lies some 6 kilometres (3.7 mi) to the south along this road, whilst Strachur is about 25 kilometres (16 mi) to the north. An unclassified road heads east from Otter Ferry to join the A886 road after some 10 kilometres (6.2 mi) near Clachan of Glendaruel; Dunoon is about 36 kilometres (22 mi) away via this road.

Despite its name, there is no longer a ferry at Otter Ferry. The former ferry used to cross Loch Fyne to a, now abandoned, pier at West Otter Ferry, near Lochgilphead, but this service ceased in the late 1940s. The Kintyre peninsula can now be reached by a car ferry across Loch Fyne from Portavadie to Tarbert. Portavadie is situated just off the B8000, some 20 kilometres (12 mi) to the south of Otter Ferry.

== Gallery ==
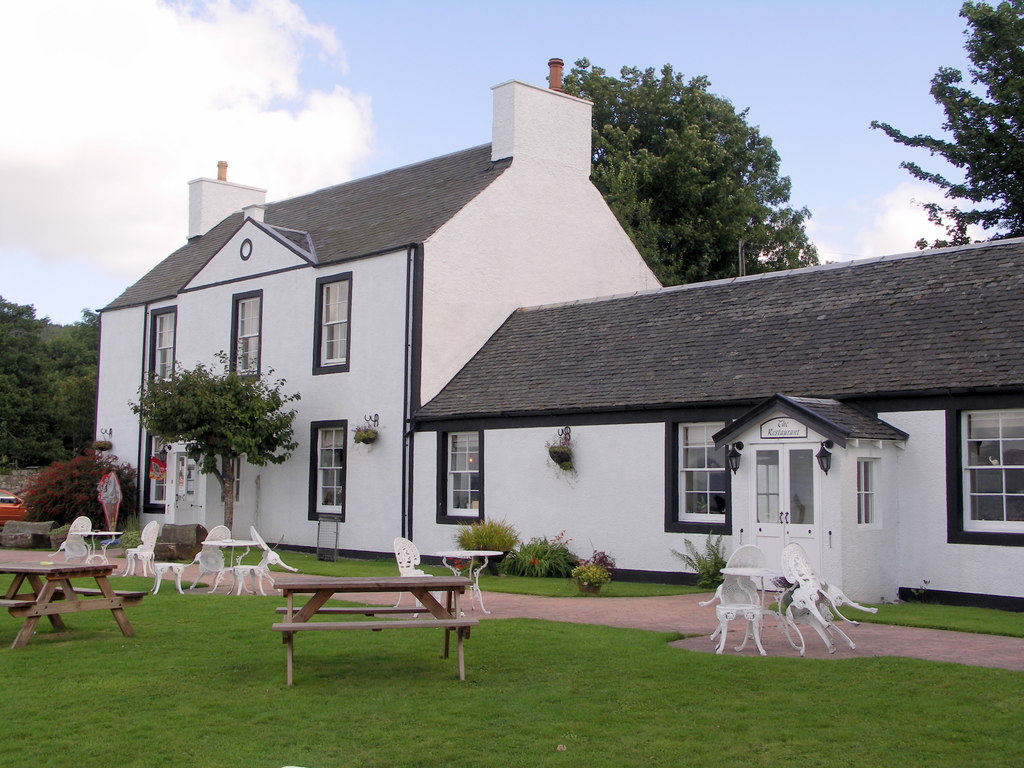
The Oystercatcher

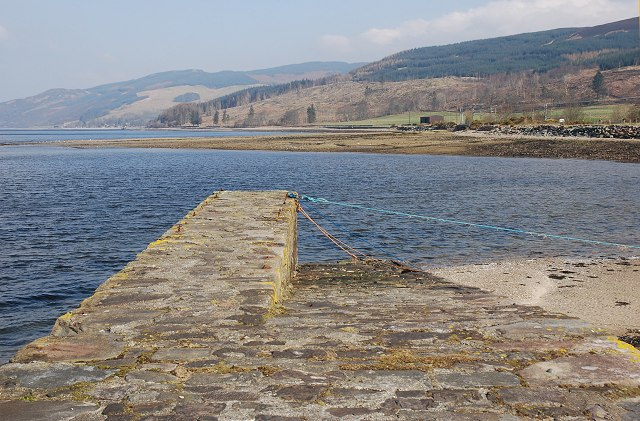
Quay at Oyster Ferry

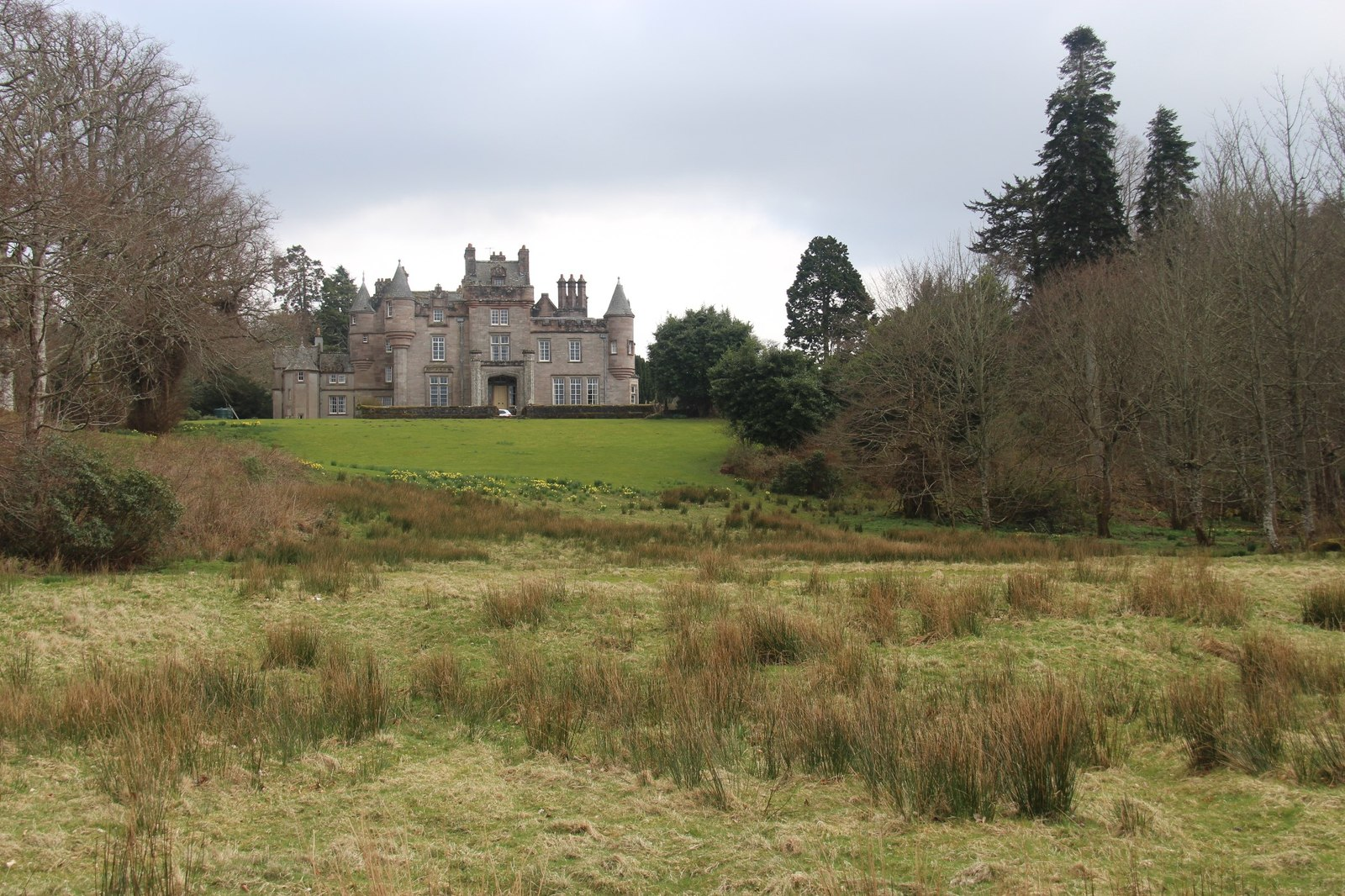
Ballimore House
