= Millhouse, Argyll =

Coordinates: 55.883246°N 5.269622°W

Millhouse
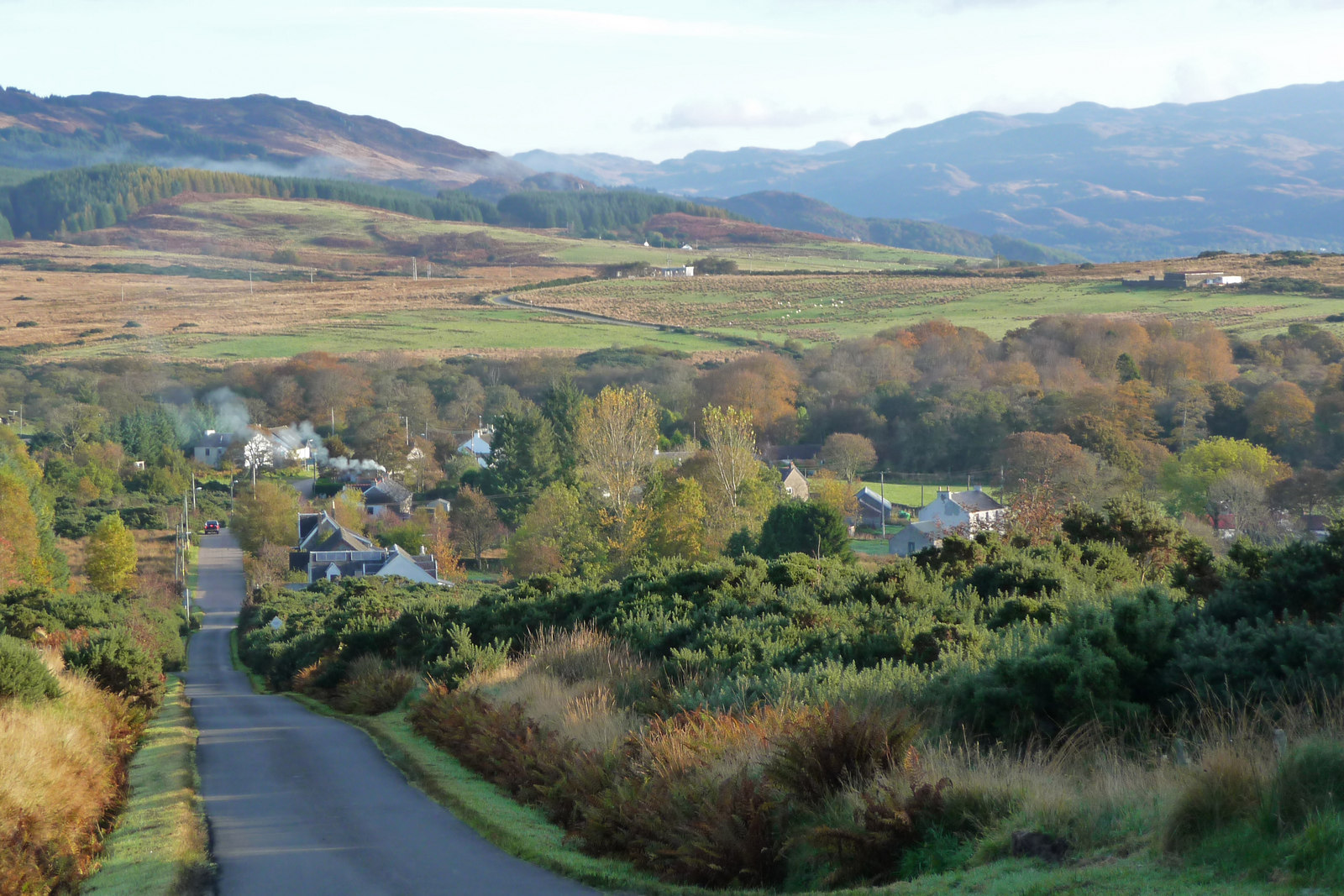
- Millhouse, Argyll, Scotland

- Location within Argyll and Bute
- OS grid reference: NR 956704
- Council area: Argyll and Bute
- Lieutenancy area: Argyll and Bute
- Country: Scotland
- Sovereign state: United Kingdom
- Post town: Tighnabruaich
- Postcode district: PA21
- Dialling code: 01700
- UK Parliament: Argyll, Bute and South Lochaber
- Scottish Parliament: Argyll and Bute

Millhouse is a village in the parish of Kilfinan. It is located on the B8000 road, and is inland from Kames in the east and Portavadie in the west, on the Cowal Peninsula, in Argyll and Bute, west of Scotland.

== History ==
Millhouse was the location of a 19th-century powder mill, which operated from 1839 until 1921. The gunpowder produced was taken to nearby Kames, where the powder mill owners built a pier/quay for the loading of boats and the onward transport of their product.

== Transport ==
=== Road ===
Millhouse is situated on the B8000 that links to Kames and Tighnabruaich, about 4 kilometres (2.5 mi) to the east, and in the other direction follows the west shore of the Cowal peninsular towards the head of Loch Fyne, some 60 kilometres (37 mi) distant. From Tignabruaich, other roads provide provides connections to Dunoon, about 40 kilometres (25 mi) away. An unclassified road also connects Millhouse to Portavadie, a distance of some 4 kilometres (2.5 mi), from where a ferry runs across Loch Fyne to Tarbert on the Kintyre Peninsula.

=== Bus ===
The village is served by the 478 Dunoon–Portavadie bus, operated by West Coast Motors.

=== National Cycle Route 75 ===
Millhouse is on the NCR75 a route from Edinburgh to Tarbert on the Kintyre peninsula. The National Cycle Network is maintained by sustrans.
