= Castle MacEwen =

Ruined fort in Argyll and Bute, Scotland

Castle MacEwan
- Scottish Gaelic: Caisteal Mhic Eoghainn
- Kilfinan, Argyll and Bute, Scotland
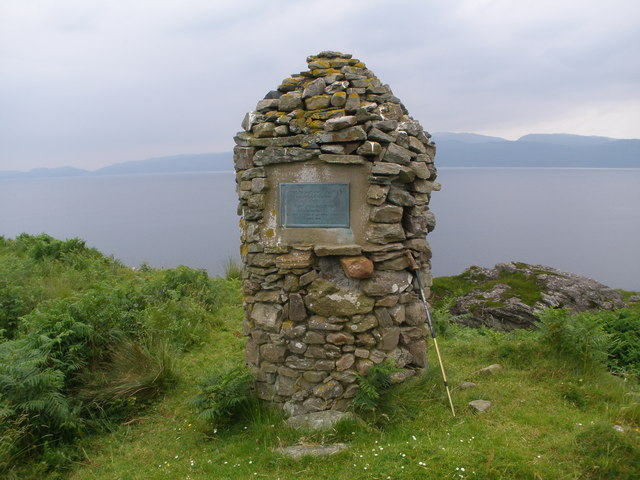
- Monument on the site of Castle MacEwen

Site information
- Type: Castle

Location
- Location within Argyll and Bute
- Coordinates: 55.963595°N 5.3408348°W

Castle MacEwen (Scottish Gaelic: Caisteal Mhic Eoghainn) is a ruined fort in Argyll and Bute, Scotland. It is near Kilfinan, on the eastern banks of Loch Fyne, around 5 kilometres (3.1 mi) south of Otter Ferry.

== History ==
The site was a medieval dun, which was superseded by a promontory fort, and later by a medieval homestead. The site is linked to the Clan MacEwen who are associated with the Loch Fyne area.

The castle was held by Clan Ewen of Otter. In the year 1432 the chief Swene MacEwen of Otter surrendered his barony to King James I who regranted it with a destination to Celestine Campbell in the event that Swene should die without an heir. Thus when Swene died in 1493, the lands passed to a branch of Clan Campbell along with the castle.

An excavation project led by the Cowal Archaeological Society in 1968-69 found that the earliest structure that stood on the site was a palisaded enclosure of medieval date. Results from the excavations also showed that a fort was built over this initial structure. Eventually, the fort was turned into a medieval homestead. The builders of the homestead used the ancient walls for bolstering defense, adding large rectangular stones to it. Passages leading to the sea, on the north and the south, were also discovered. Postholes provided material that was dated to the 15th and 16th centuries, and vitrified material was also discovered.

Another discovery was made in 1969, when a round house built against the rampart at the gateway was discovered. The house had a cobbled floor, and it was conjectured that the building was possibly a store house. The other discovery was of a building resembling a boat. It was found just outside the main rampart. These new discoveries were, however, not accompanied by findings of any objects, which meant that the age of the buildings could not be ascertained. Other finds included a 12th-century crucifix, a 15th-century groat, and 13th and 18th century pottery shards. All finds were sent to the Glasgow Art Gallery and Museum.
