= Polphail =

Archaeological site in Highland, Scotland

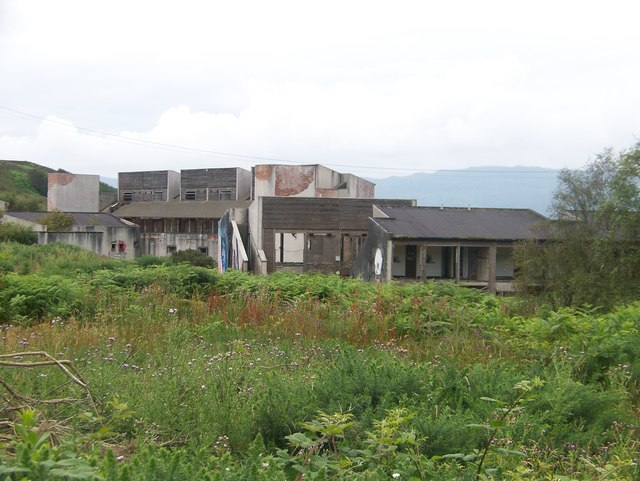
- Ruins of Polphail village

- Location in Argyll, Scotland
- 55.870056°N 5.306956°W
- Type: village
- Periods: 1970s-2016
- Location: Argyll

Polphail was a ghost village, located at Portavadie in Argyll & Bute, Scotland. Originally built in the 1970s, it was never occupied and was demolished in 2016.

== Development ==
The farms of 'Portavaudie' and 'Pollphail' are depicted amongst areas of cultivated ground on the Ordnance Survey 1st edition map (1870). Portavadie continued into the 1970s as a small rural settlement comprising half a dozen houses. Polphail farm appears to have been abandoned and is not depicted on the Ordnance Survey ‘Popular’ edition map in 1926 (Sheet 71).

The origins of the village lie during the expansion of the oil industry in the 1970s. Specific locations around the coast of Scotland were developed for construction sites to build oil rig platforms. Portavadie and Polphail on the west coast of the Cowal peninsula, on Loch Fyne, was chosen as one such location. It provided a sheltered port, a geological feature in which to build a dry dock and a construction yard for the building of deep water oil gravity platforms. Land was purchased for the whole development by the Government for the construction yard and adjacent village that was built between 1975 and 1977, to house up to 500 workers. The position of the new village was placed just north of Polphail farm. The impetus to build the yard was based on future forecasting and was to be operated by the people living in Polphail village, but structural design issues of the oil gravity platforms, cost implications and inflexibility in the sector at the time led to no orders being placed at the yard.

== Decline and demolition ==
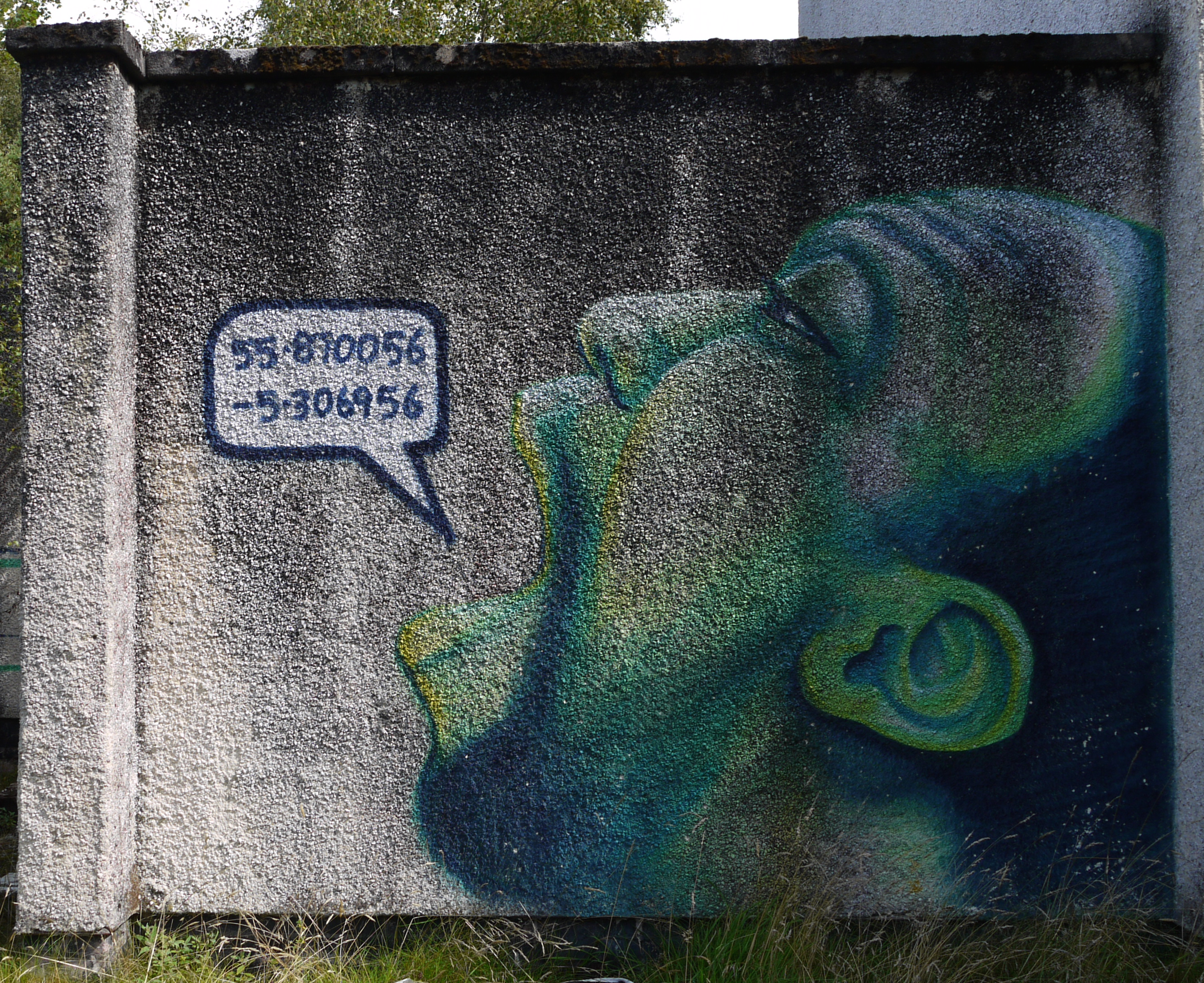
Graffiti at Polphail

Polphail village was never occupied, and was a ruin from the outset.

In July 2009 Agents of Change, an artistic collective, came to Polphail knowing that the site was due for demolition later that year. They created a graffiti art gallery with paintings of figures, faces, abstract designs and haunting images. The village was finally demolished by December 2016, at a cost of £300,000, with a planning application submitted for a craft distillery on the site.

Today, Portavadie comprises eight individual houses, a row of detached holiday houses built as part of the marina development, and the ferry terminal across Loch Fyne to Tarbert.
