= Kames, Argyll =

Coordinates: 55.890202°N 5.2446110°W

Kames: Scottish Gaelic: Camas nam Muclach
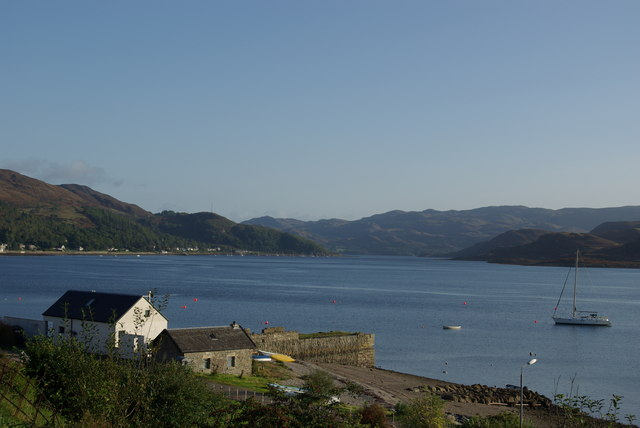
- Pier at Kames

- Location within Argyll and Bute
- OS grid reference: NR 97200 71100
- Council area: Argyll and Bute
- Lieutenancy area: Argyll and Bute
- Country: Scotland
- Sovereign state: United Kingdom
- Post town: TIGHNABRUAICH
- Postcode district: PA21
- Dialling code: 01700
- UK Parliament: Argyll, Bute and South Lochaber
- Scottish Parliament: Argyll and Bute

Kames (Scottish Gaelic: Camas nam Muclach) is a small village on the Cowal Peninsula, in Argyll and Bute, west of Scotland, on the shore of the west arm of the Kyles of Bute.

Kames is now part of a continuous coastal strip of housing that joins onto Tighnabruaich. Kames has a grocery shop (containing a post office, and relaunched under new management as the "Kames Village Store" in late 2016), a church and a hotel.

The Kames Hotel has views over the west arm of the Kyles of Bute.

== History ==
Between 1839 and 1921 the village was involved in the transit of gunpowder that was made in the nearby inland settlement of Millhouse. The gunpowder plant owners built a pier and quay for the transport of their products.

== Sport and leisure ==
=== National Cycle Route 75 ===
Kames is on the NCR75 a route from Edinburgh to Tarbert on the Kintyre peninsula. The National Cycle Network is maintained by Sustrans.

=== Kyles of Bute golf club ===
The Kyles of Bute golf club is located above Kames and was founded in 1907. It is a nine-hole course and has no bunkers, as the terrain provides enough hazards on the course.

== Transport ==
=== Road ===
Kames is situated on the B8000 that links to Tighnabruaich, about 2 kilometres (1.2 mi) to the east, and to Millhouse, a similar distance to the west. From Tignabruaich, other roads provide provides connections to Dunoon, about 40 kilometres (25 mi) away. An unclassified road connects Millhouse to Portavadie, a distance of some 6 kilometres (3.7 mi), from where a ferry runs across Loch Fyne to Tarbert on the Kintyre Peninsula.

=== Bus ===
The village is served by the 478 Dunoon–Portavadie bus, operated by West Coast Motors.

== Notable people ==
The artist Hamilton Macallum (1841–1896) was born in Kames.

== Gallery ==
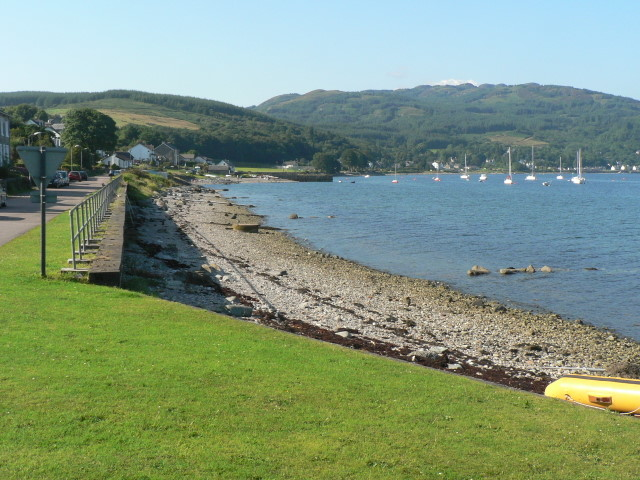
Kames foreshore

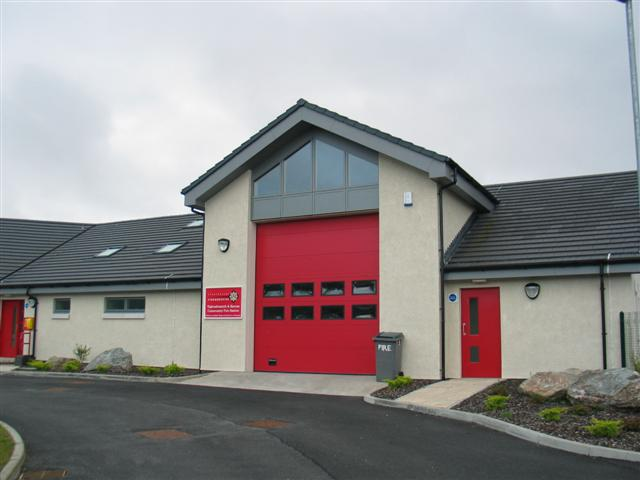
Tighnabruaich and Kames Fire Station

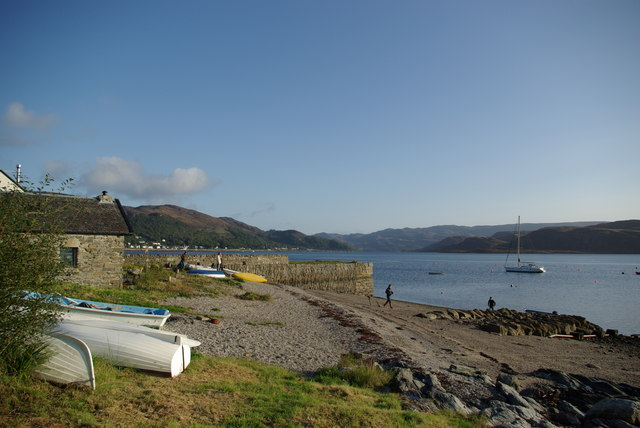
Kames pier
