= B8000 road =

Secondary road in Argyll & Bute, Scotland

B8000

Route information
- Length: 37.2 mi (59.9 km)

Major junctions
- South end: Tighnabruaich
- North end: Junction with A886 near Strachur

Location
- Country: United Kingdom
- Primary destinations: Kames, Millhouse, Kilfinan, Otter Ferry, Castle Lachlan

Road network
- Roads in the United Kingdom; Motorways; A and B road zones

The B8000 is a scenic secondary road in the Argyll and Bute district of Scotland. It runs broadly parallel to the west and south coasts of the Cowal peninsula from Tighnabruaich, on the shore of the Kyles of Bute, to a point on the Loch Fyne shore just south of Strachur.

For most of its route, the B8000 is a single-track road with passing places. It is 59.8 kilometres (37.2 mi) in length. Because the A886 and A8003 offer a shorter and faster route between its end points, the B8000 is principally used by sightseers and local residents.

== History ==
The current route of the B8000 has had several previous designations, being the B837 and then the A886. Similarly the B8000 designation was previously used for part of the route that is now the A886. The two roads swapped their designators in the late 1960s.

== Route ==
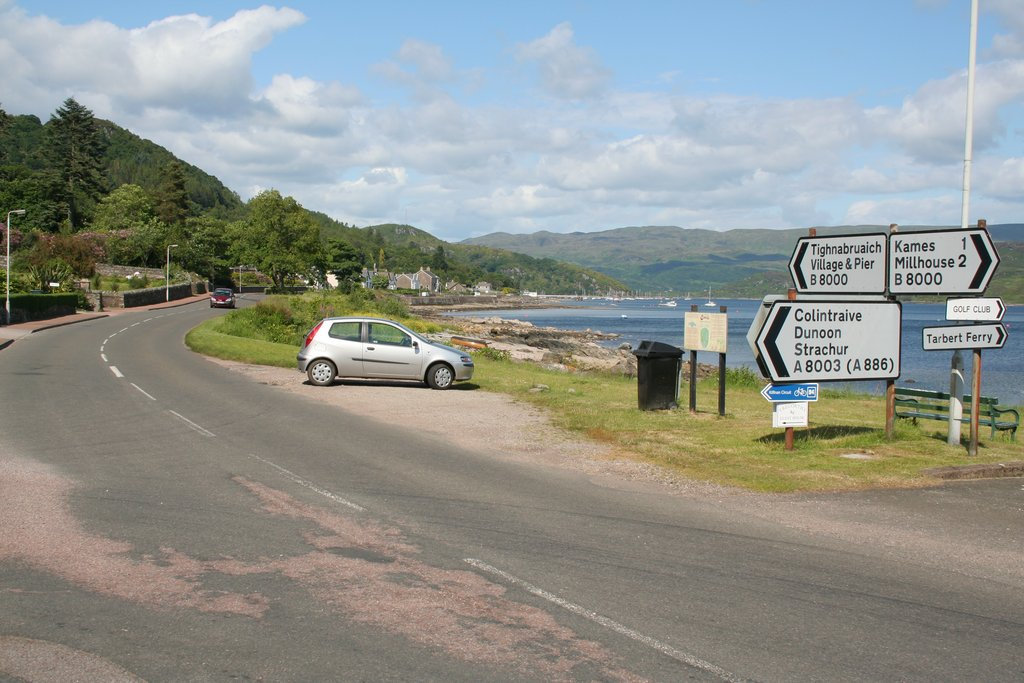
The junction of the B8000 and A8003

The south-eastern terminus of the B8000 is near the pier in Tighnabruaich. For its first 1 kilometre (0.62 mi) or so, it heads south, directly alongside the Kyles of Bute and parallel to the A8003, which runs further inland and at a higher level. Eventually the two roads merge just before they arrive in Kames, which marks the end of the A8003.

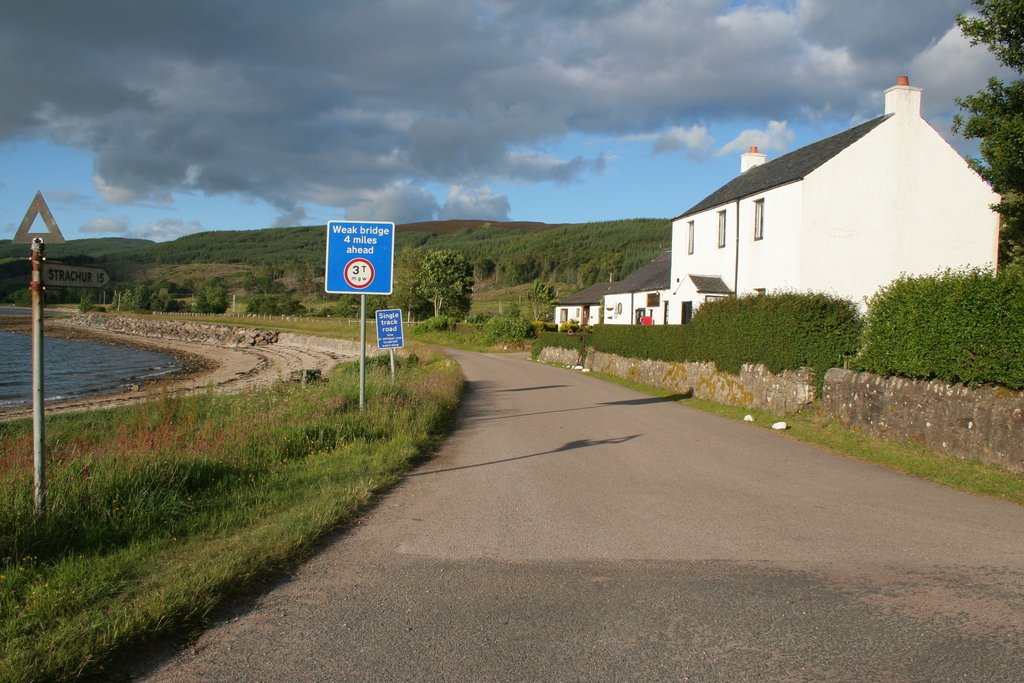
The B8000 at Otter Ferry

The B8000 then turns sharply west to reach the inland village of Millhouse. Here a short unclassified side road links to Portavadie, where a car ferry crosses Loch Fyne to Tarbert on the Kintyre peninsula. From Millhouse the B8000 turns north and runs via the settlements of Kilfinan and Otter Ferry. Despite its name, there is no longer a ferry at Otter Ferry, but an unclassified road runs east to meet the A886 near Clachan of Glendaruel.

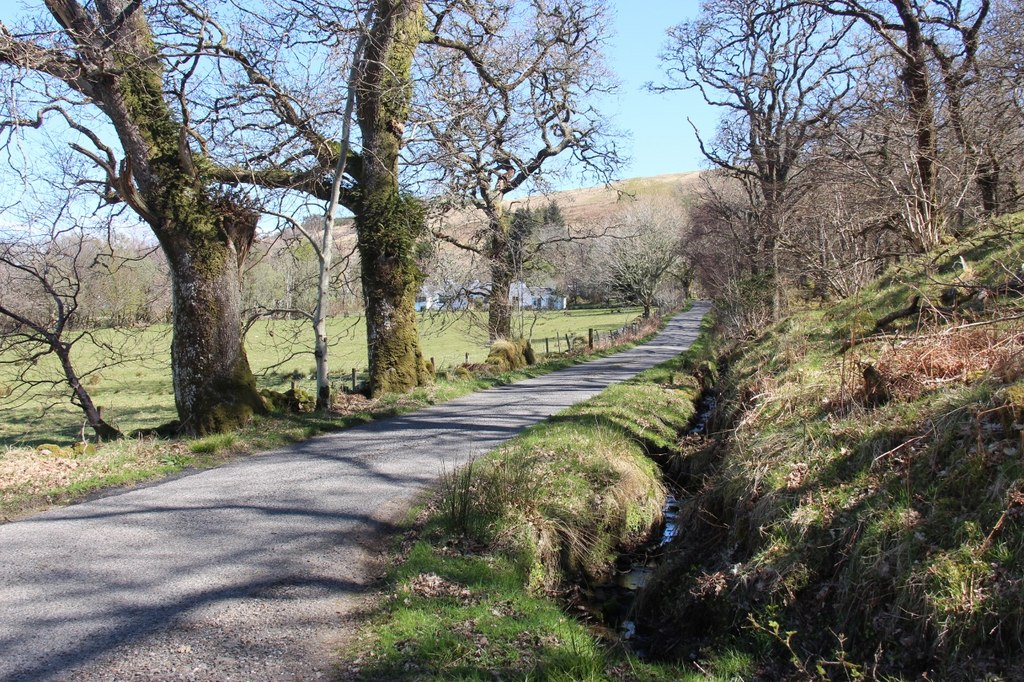
The B8000 approaching Castle Lachlan

From Otter Ferry, the B8000 runs directly alongside Loch Fyne for some 14 kilometres (8.7 mi). Eventually it reaches the ruined Old Castle Lachlan and its more recent replacement. Here it turns north-east up Strathlachlan and reaches its end at a junction with the A886 some 5 kilometres (3.1 mi) south of Strachur. Northbound, the A886 offers various connections towards Glasgow, either via the Rest and be Thankful pass or via a ferry from Dunoon to the south side of the Firth of Clyde. It also offers, in conjunction with the A8003, a shorter and faster route back to Tighnabruaich.

== Buses ==
A short stretch of the B8000, between Tighnabruaich and Millhouse, is used by the 478 bus route from Dunoon to Portavadie. The service is operated by West Coast Motors.
