= Sound of Jura =

Body of water in Argyll and Bute, Scotland

- An Linne Rosach (Scottish Gaelic)
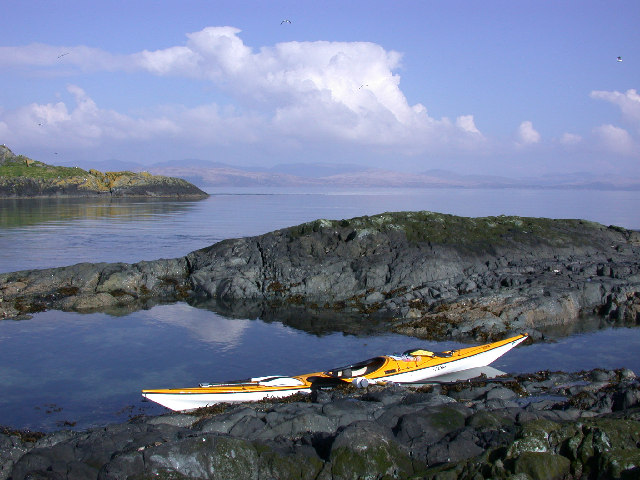
- Small group of skerries in the Sound of Jura, looking Northwest towards Jura

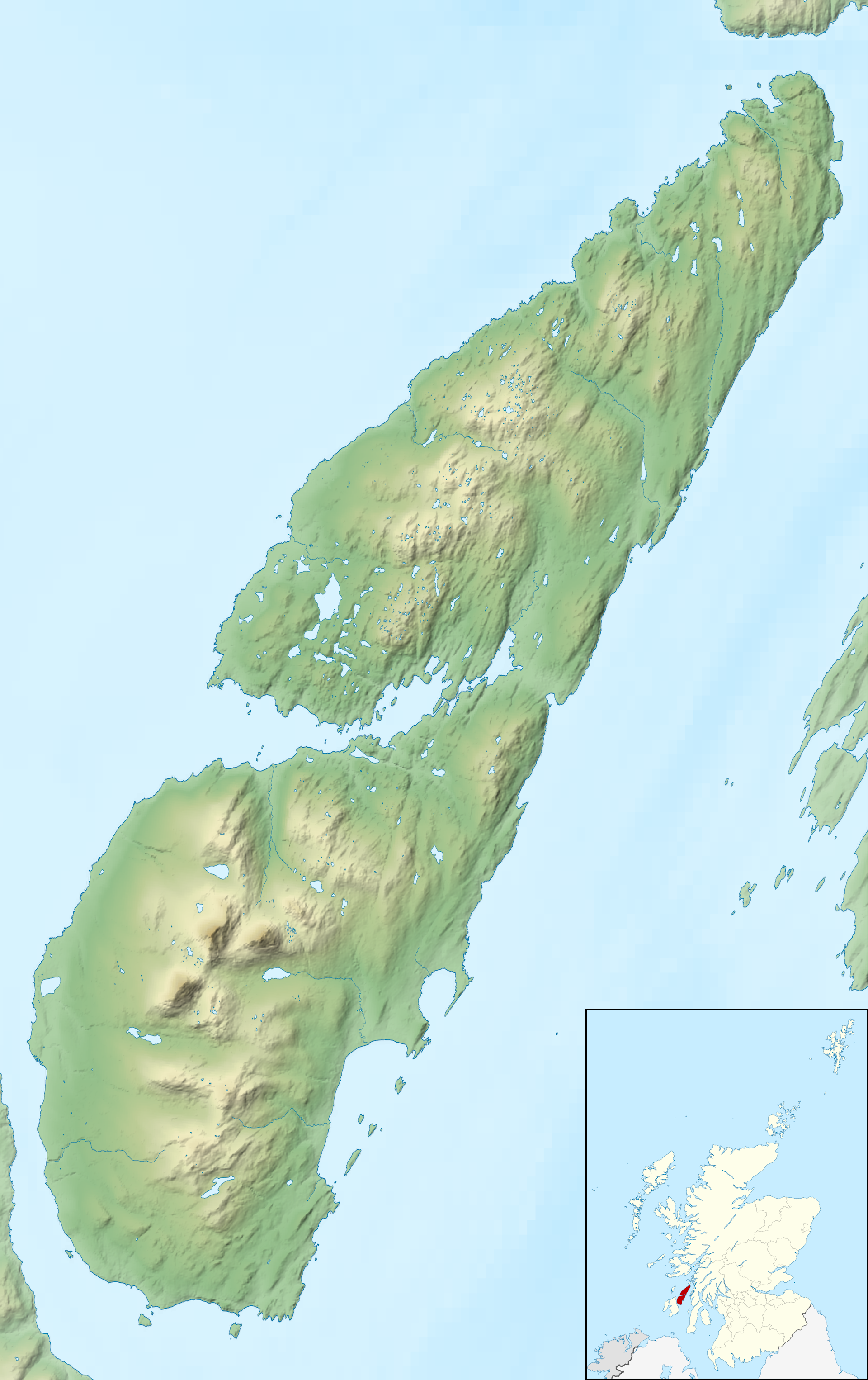
- Location within Jura
- Location: Western Scotland
- Coordinates: 55°58′50″N 5°45′20″W
- Type: Sound
- Frozen: No

The Sound of Jura (Scottish Gaelic: An Linne Rosach) is a sound in Argyll and Bute, Scotland. It is one of the several Sounds of Scotland. It is to the east of the island of Jura and the west of Knapdale, in the north of the Kintyre Peninsula, of the Scottish mainland. Lochs that lead to the sound include Loch Sween, and Loch Killisport (Caolisport (Scottish Gaelic)). It is not to be confused with the Sound of Islay, which lies between Jura and Islay. Most of Jura's small population lives on the east coast, overlooking the sound.

- The north end is particularly treacherous, being filled with skerries, small islands, strong tidal currents and whirlpools.
- The south end, in contrast, is much wider and more open; most of the small islands and reefs are close to shore. The ferries to Colonsay and Islay from the mainland skirt the southern end of the sound.

== Gulf of Corryvreckan ==
The Gulf of Corryvreckan, which contains a notorious whirlpool, the world's third largest, located at the north of the Sound.

== Crinan Canal ==
The Crinan Canal's west exit is also on the Sound of Jura. The canal is a shorter route from Loch Fyne, than sailing round the Mull of Kintyre.

== Lighthouses ==
=== Ruadh Sgeir Lighthouse ===
The Ruadh Sgeir Lighthouse, built in 1906, by David A and Charles Stevenson. It is a category C listed structure (LB52575). Located at grid reference NR 72141 92628.

=== Skervuile Lighthouse ===
The Skervuile lighthouse, was completed in 1865, built by David and Thomas Stevenson. Located at grid reference NR 60459 71191, at the entrance to Lowlandman's Bay.

== Gallery ==
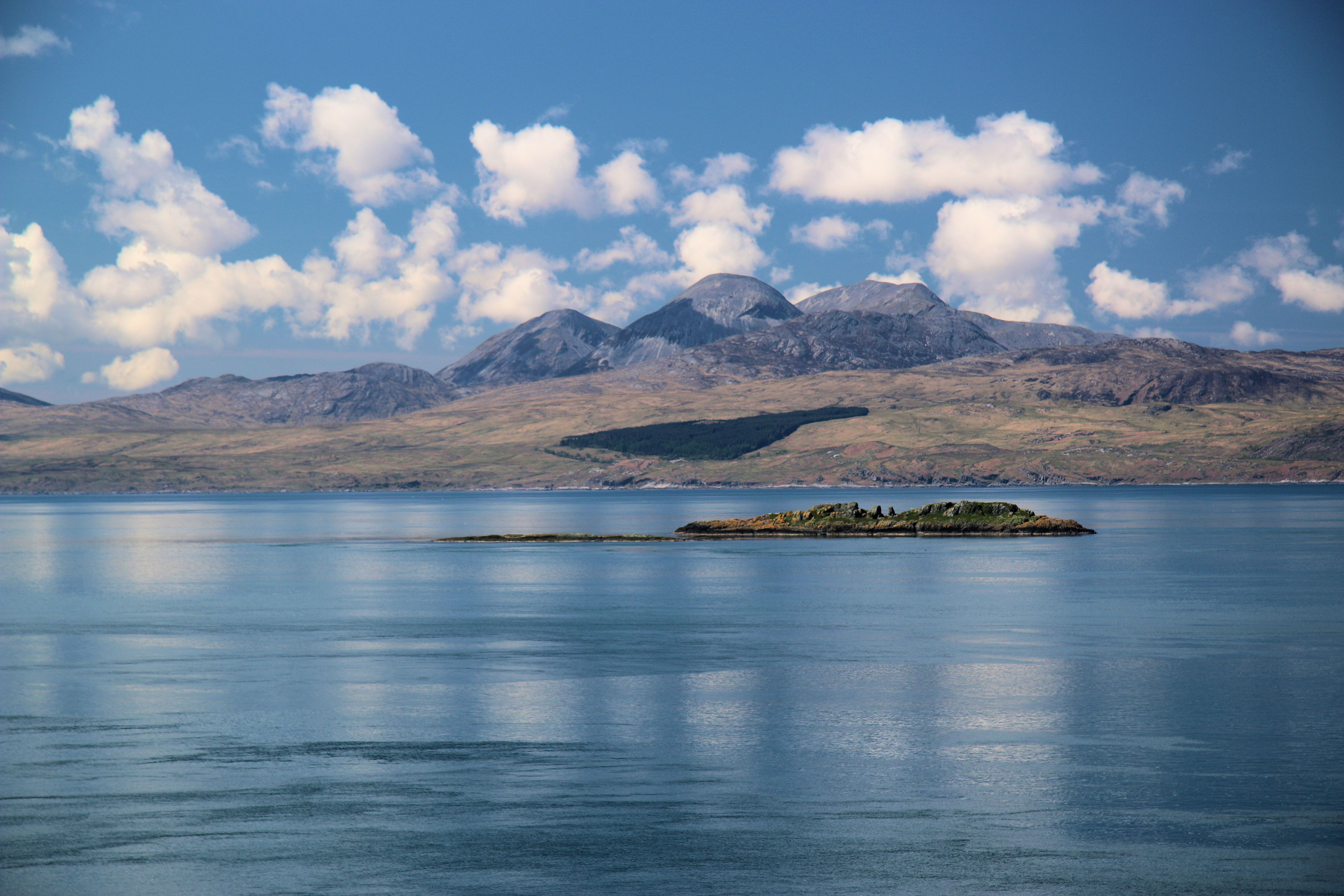
Islets in the Sound of Jura

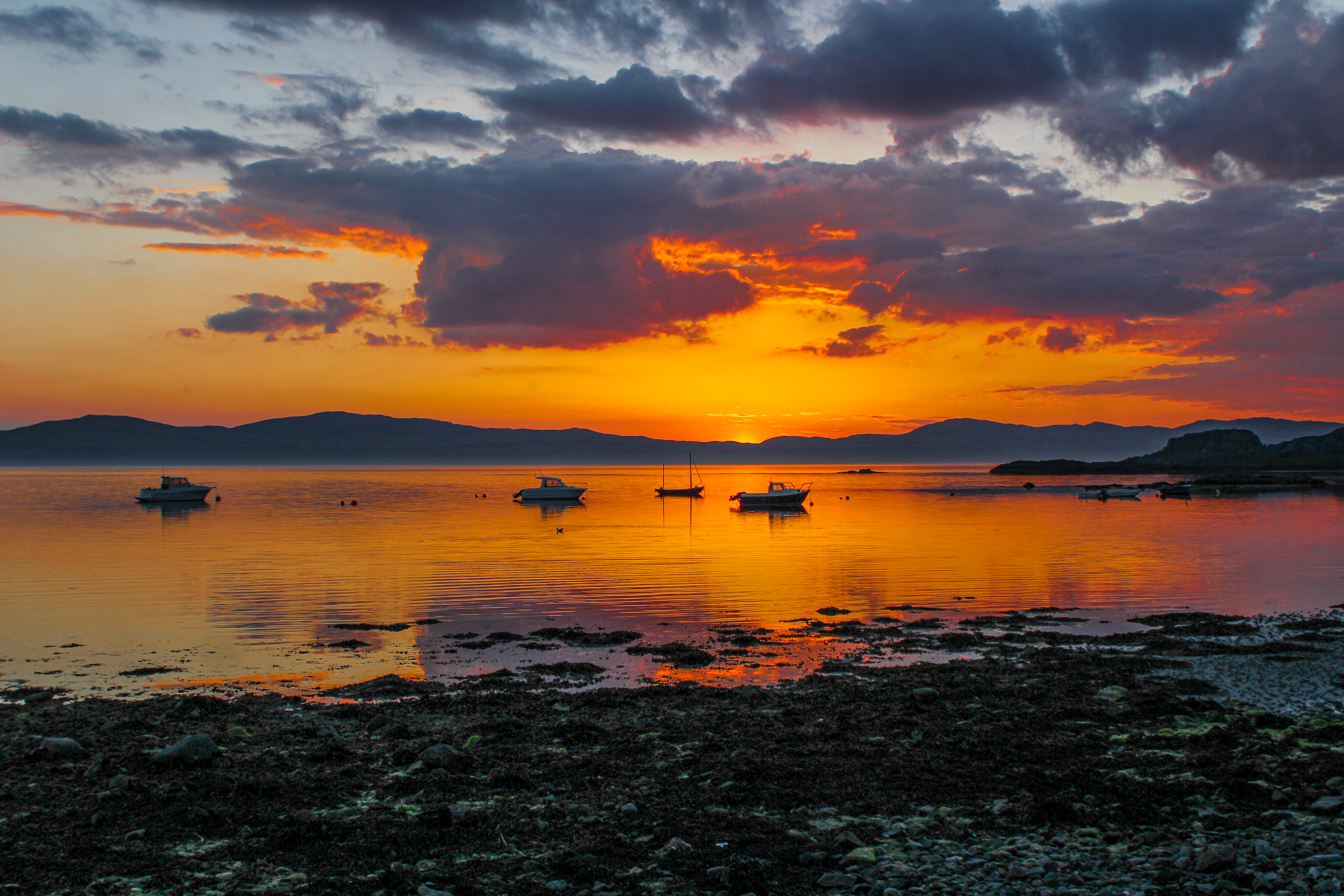
Sunset over the Sound of Jura, Carsaig Bay

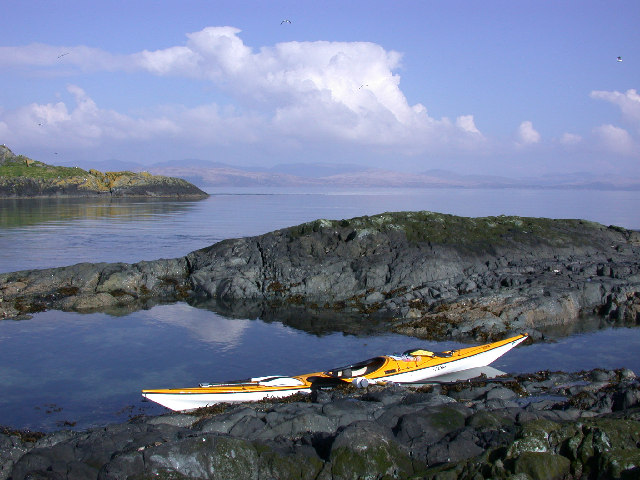
Dubh Sgeir The sound of Jura

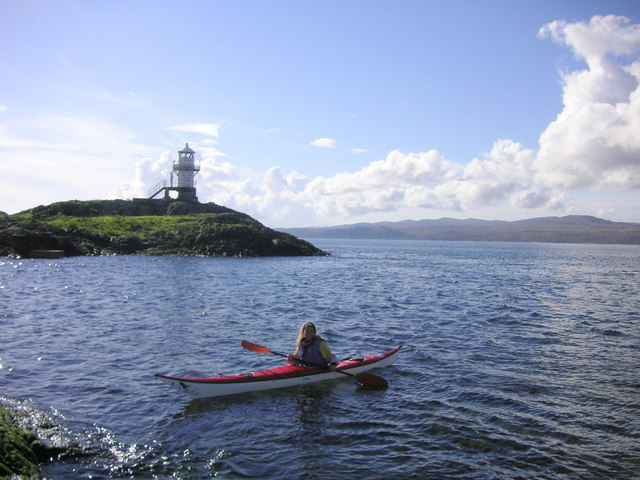
Ruadh Sgeir Lighthouse

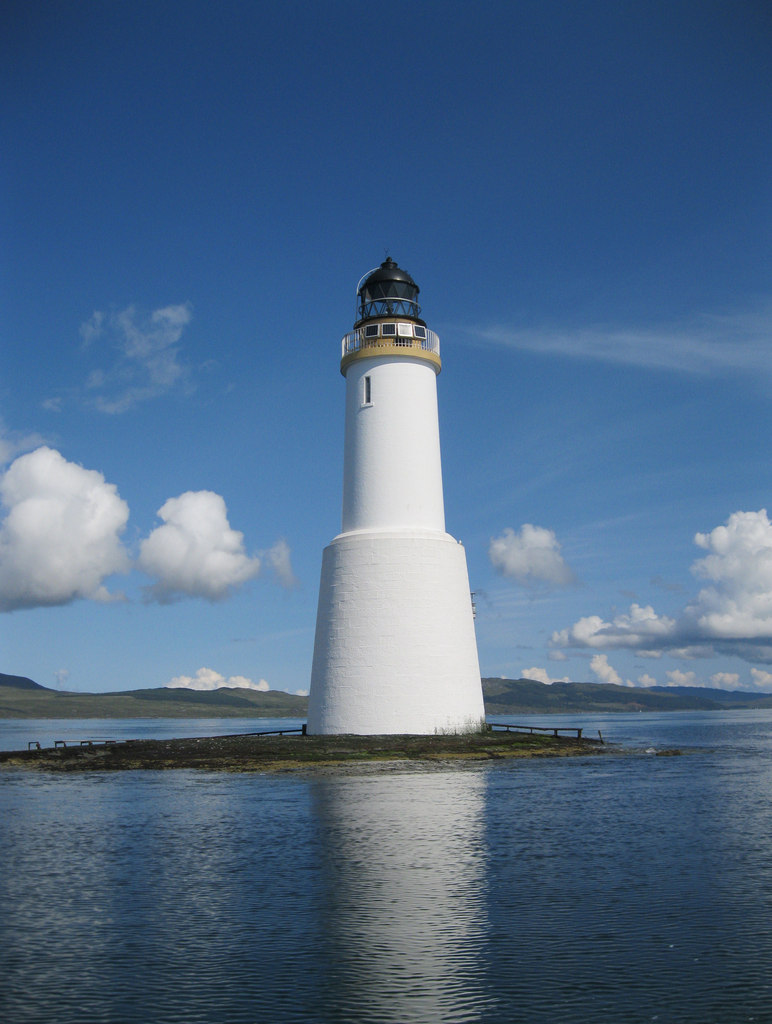
Skervuile lighthouse
