= Skervuile lighthouse =

Coordinates: 55.8741°N 5.8309°W

Skervuile lighthouse

The Skervuile lighthouse is a lighthouse on a reef in the Sound of Jura in Argyll and Bute, Scotland. It was established in 1865 by David and Thomas Stevenson.
