= Hamilton Macallum =

Scottish painter (1841–1896)

(John Thomas) Hamilton Macallum (22 May 1841 – 23 June 1896) was a Scottish painter.

== Life ==
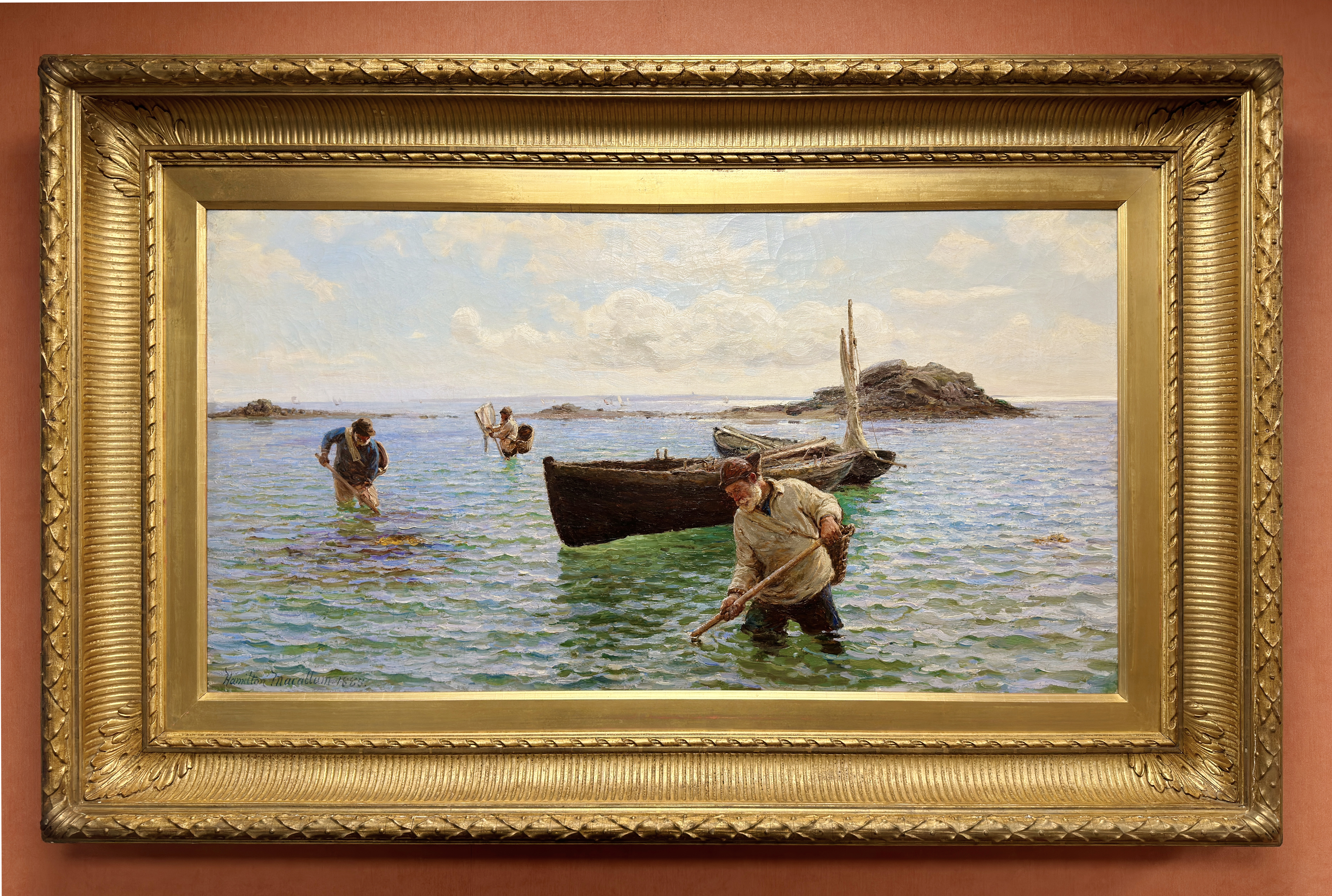
Shrimping, Devon (1885), by Hamilton Macallum

Born at Kames, Argyllshire, on 22 May 1841, he was the second son of John Macallum, J.P., of the Kames gunpowder works. His father insisted on his entering a merchant's office in Glasgow, in preparation for an Indian commercial career. In 1864, when he was 23 years of age, he went to London to become a painter.

Macallum entered the Royal Academy schools the same year, 1864. He had studios successively at Hampstead (Haverstock Hill), in Piccadilly, and at Beer, Devon. He painted in the western Scottish Highlands from a small yacht, the south coast of Devon, Heligoland, the Netherlands, and southern Italy.

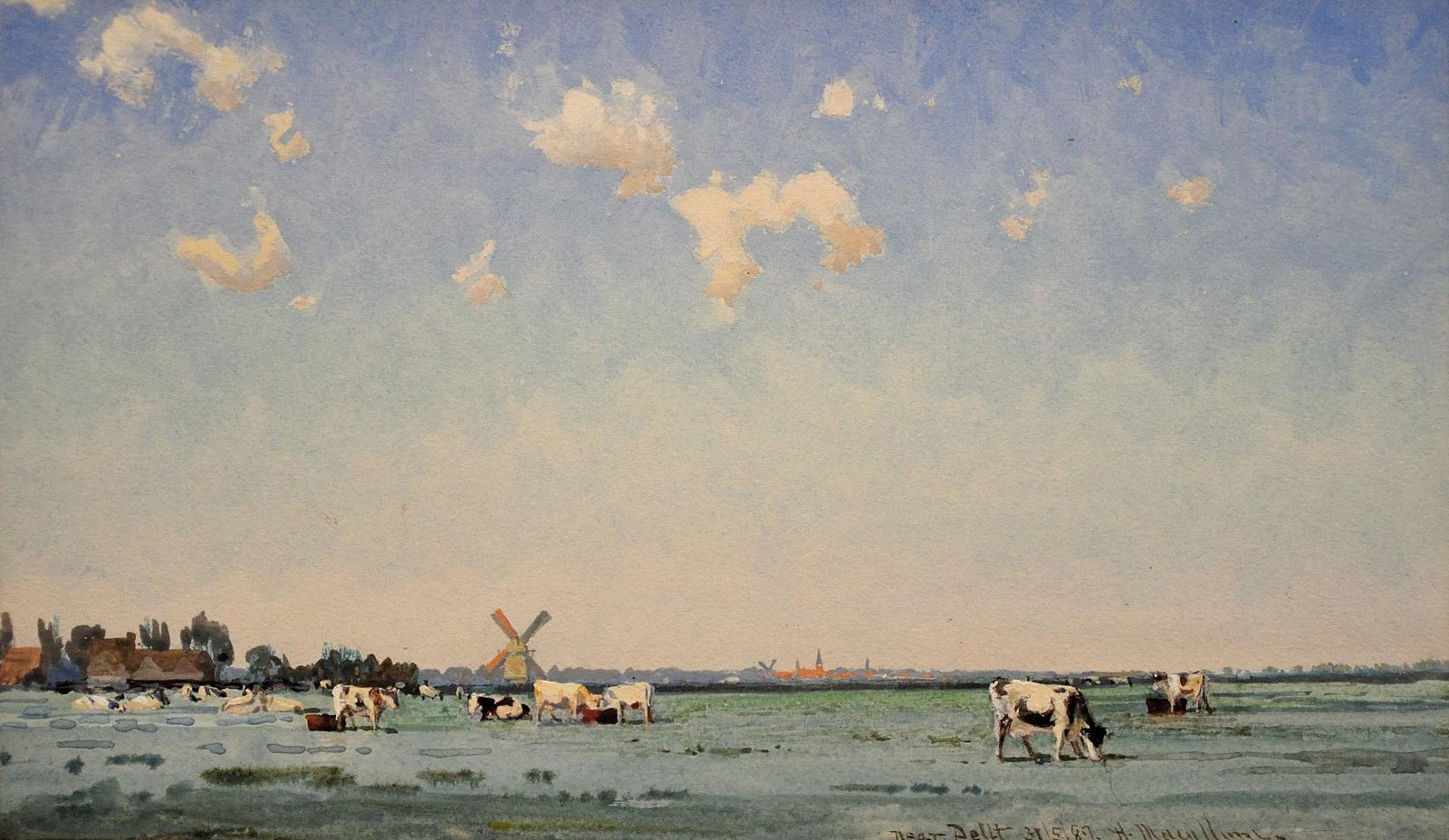
Pasture, Near Delft (1887), by Hamilton Macallum

His contributions to the major London exhibitions extended over twenty years, from 1876, when Hoisting the Storm Jib was at the Royal Academy, until 1896, when his last picture, the Crofter's Team, (which went to the Millbank Gallery) hung on the same walls. Macallum died very suddenly of heart disease at Beer on 23 June 1896.

== Family ==
Macallum left a widow, Euphemia, daughter of John Stewart of Glasgow, and one son. Mrs. Macallum subsequently (13 March 1900) received a civil list pension.

== Memorial ==
A memorial to Macallum was erected by residents of Beer.

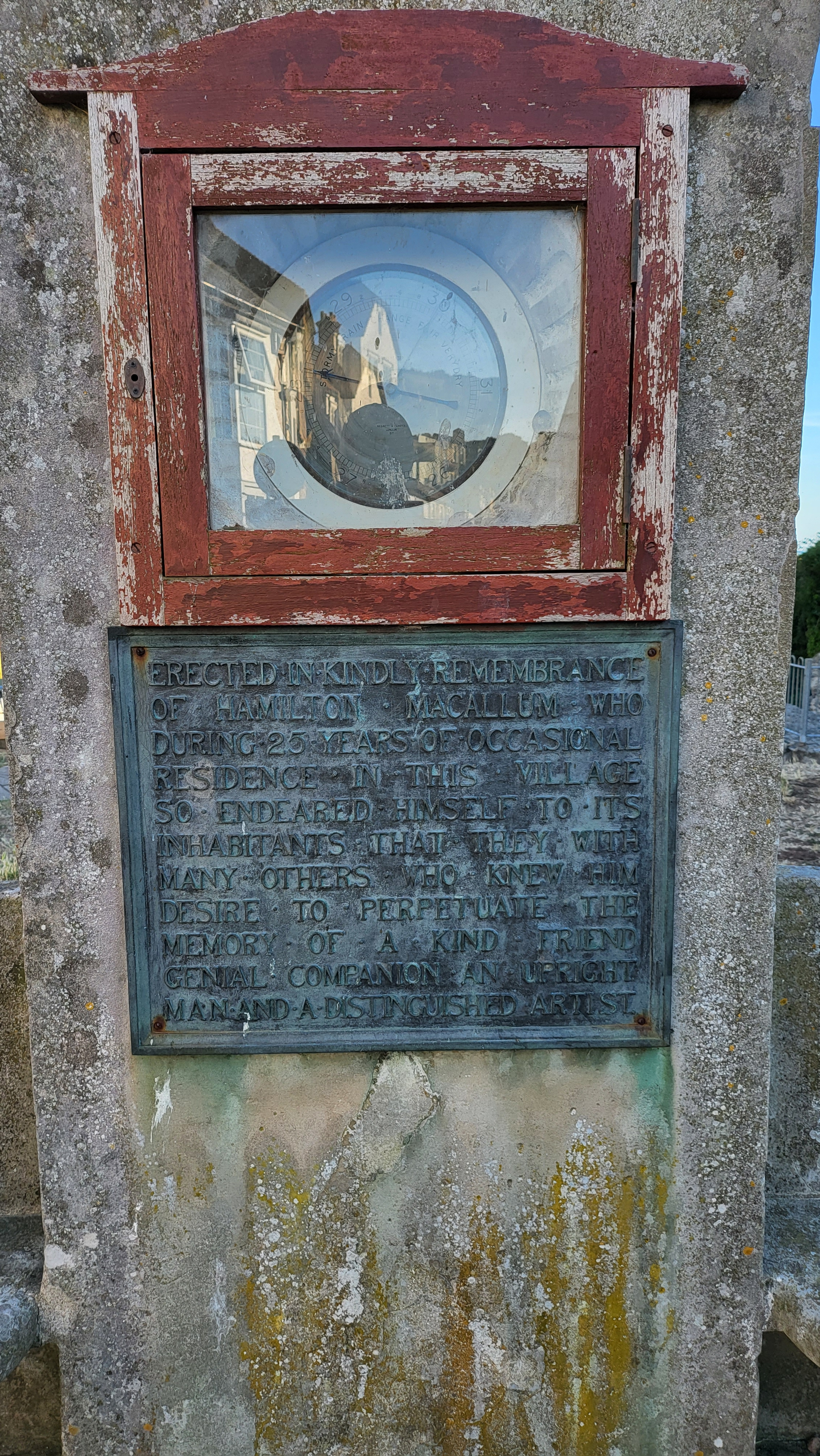
Hamilton Macallum memorial, Beer, Uk
