= Loch Fyne =

Sea inlet on west coast of Scotland

- Loch Gilp, Loch Shira
- Loch Fine (Scottish Gaelic)
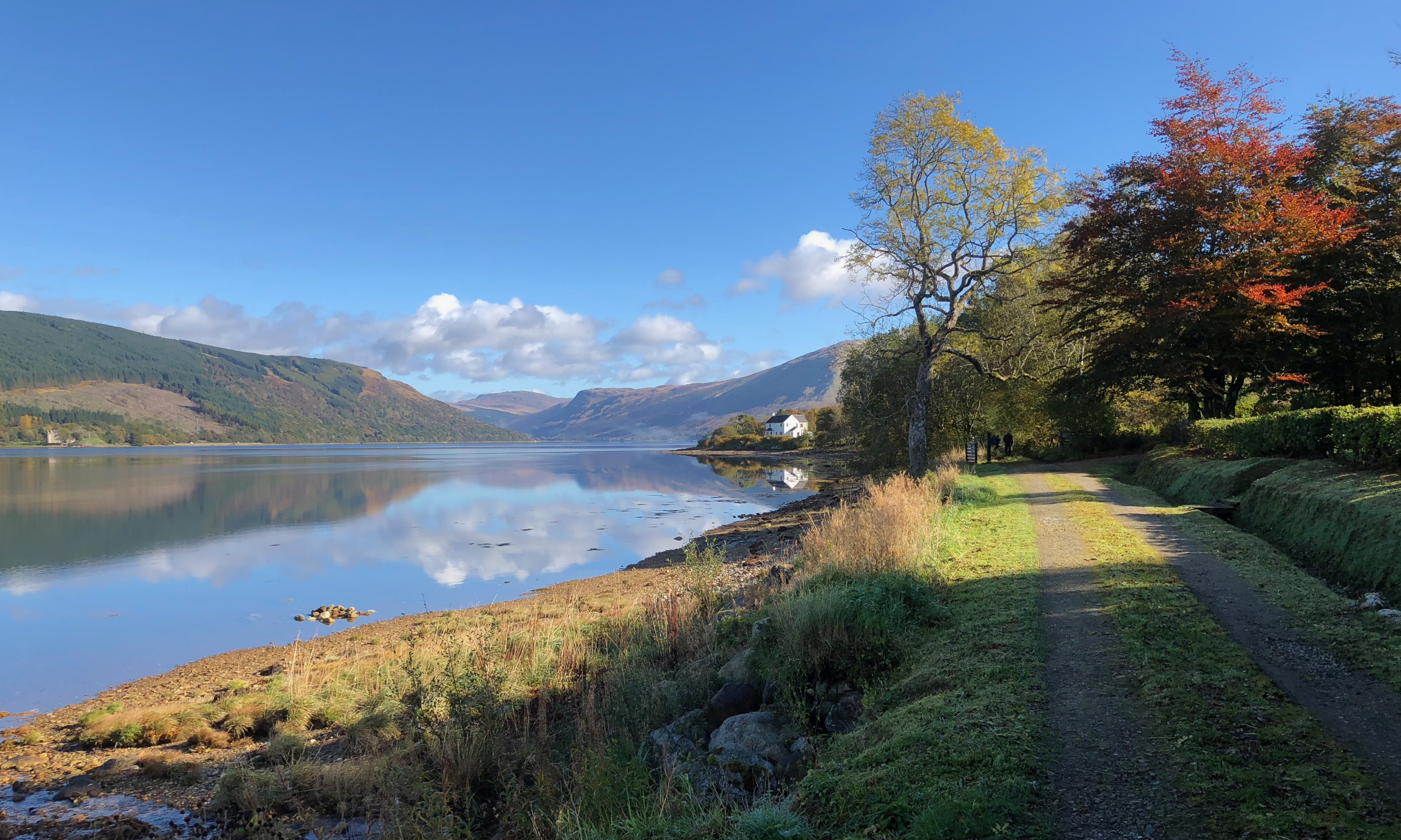
- Head of the loch from near St Catherines

- Location within Argyll and Bute
- Location: Cowal Peninsula, Argyll and Bute, Scotland.
- Coordinates: 56.05°N 5.31°W, grid reference NR939890
- Type: Sea Loch
- Etymology: Vine (wine) lake Loch
- River sources: Curl Arstich burn, river garron river Fyne lingerton burn king las water allt na craobh uinsinn Allt oigh Allt oich allt na Craig Abhainn Mor Inverneill river Allt Airigh na brodaig Douglas water dalchenna burn Allt Airigh na brodaig Abhainn Srathain Ardfenaig burn Crinan Canal Inverdrishaig water Allt an bog
- Basin countries: Scotland, United Kingdom
- Salinity: Seawater
- Surface elevation: Sea Level
- Frozen: No

Loch Fyne (Scottish Gaelic: Loch Fìne, pronounced [l̪ˠɔx ˈfiːnə]; meaning "Loch of the Vine/Wine"), is a sea loch off the Firth of Clyde and forms part of the coast of the Cowal Peninsula. Located on the west coast of Argyll and Bute, west of Scotland. It extends 65 kilometres (40 mi) inland from the Sound of Bute, making it the longest of the sea lochs in Scotland. It is connected to the Sound of Jura by the Crinan Canal. Although there is no evidence that grapes have grown there, the title is probably honorific, indicating that the river, Abhainn Fìne (river Fyne), was a well-respected river.

In the north the terrain is mountainous, with the Arrochar Alps, Beinn Bhuidhe, Glen Shira, Glen Fyne, Glen Croe, Arrochar, Tyndrum and Loch Lomond nearby.

It is overlooked by the Tinkers' Heart, an old travellers' monument. It was a place for weddings to traditionally take place.

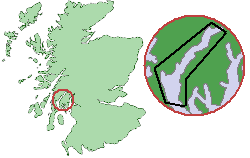
Loch Fyne in Scotland

== Transport ==
=== Roads ===
The loch has several roads surrounding it. The A83 goes round the head of the loch then travels down the west coast of Loch Fyne, from Ardrishaig to Tarbert along the Knapdale coast. Leaving the A83 north of Cairndow the A815 travels down the east shore of Loch Fyne along the Cowal Peninsula coast to Strachur, where to continue down the east shore the A886 leads to Newton. Where you turn off onto the B8000 which carries on down the east shore to Millhouse, where you can go to Portavadie or Kames (direct) or via the Ardlamont Peninsula, a longer route to Kames.

=== Ferries ===
At the mouth of Loch Fyne between Portavadie on the Cowal Peninsula, on the east shore of the loch. A vehicle ferry traverses the loch to Tarbert on the Kintyre Peninsula on the west shore.

=== Crinan Canal ===
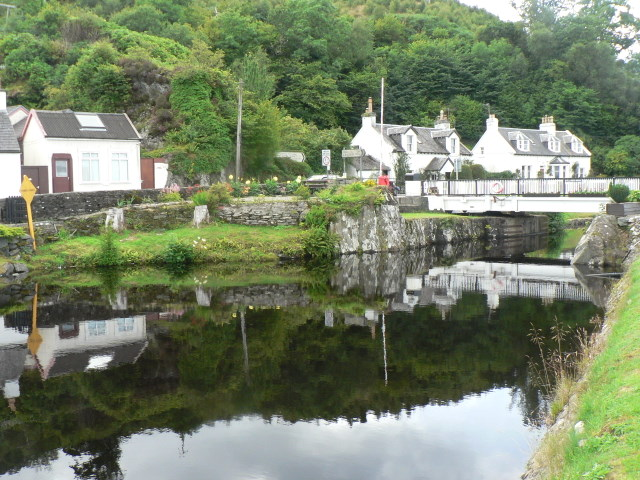
The Crinan Canal at Bellanoch

The Crinan Canal connects Loch Fyne at Ardrishaig and the Sound of Jura at the hamlet of Crinan itself, giving a shortcut for smaller vessels out to the Hebrides saving the longer route of going around the Kintyre Peninsula. The canal was built between 1794 and 1801 when the canal was opened, under the supervision of John Rennie. In 1816 Thomas Telford redesigned parts of the canal to remedy technical issues with water supplies for the canal. There are fifteen locks along the canal's 9-mile (14 km) length.

== History ==
=== World War II ===
During the Second World War, HMS Quebec (a shore establishment) also known as the "No 1" Combined Operations Training Centre (CTC) was centred a few miles south of Inveraray and used the shores of the Loch Fyne and surrounding coastline. It trained personnel in the techniques involved in the use of landing craft and the setting-up of a beachhead. The No1 CTC was manned and trained personnel from all three services, Royal Navy, Royal Air Force and the Army; troops of the Allies were also trained. This important military facility was set up in October 1940, and around 250,000 personnel passed through the training centre by 1944. The main site is now occupied by Argyll Caravan Park.

== Nature and conservation ==
Dolphins, seals and otters inhabit the loch, and basking sharks can appear in its waters during the summer months. A Ross's gull was present at the loch in early 2007.

In 2014 Loch Fyne was declared a Nature Conservation Marine Protected Area (NCMPA). The designation covers the entire loch northwards from a point near Otter Ferry.

== Fisheries ==
Loch Fyne has a reputation for its oyster fishery, and as a consequence, the loch has given its name to the once locally owned Loch Fyne Oysters and to the associated Loch Fyne Restaurants. It is also notable for its herring-fishing industry, and hence the famous Loch Fyne Kipper, originally caught using the drift-net method. In the mid-19th century, Loch Fyne was the centre of the battle between the traditional drift-net fishermen and the new trawl-net fishermen who sprang up around Tarbert and Campbeltown in 1833.

Several Scottish sea-fishing records have been set in the loch:

Species	Weight lb-oz-dr	Angler	Date	Method
Dogfish black mouthed	02-13-08 (1.29 kg)	J. H. Anderson	1977	Boat
Poor cod	01-00-00 (0.45 kg)	F. Johnstone	1970	Shore
Tadpole fish	01-04-00 (0.57 kg)	H. Donnelly	1995	Shore
Blue whiting	01-12-00 (0.79 kg)	J. H. Anderson	1977	Boat

== Sport and leisure ==
=== Diving ===
Loch Fyne is a popular area for sport diving. Off the coast at St Catherines, is a boulder field and a wrecked speedboat. At Kenmore Point is Stallion Rock, a single rock that rises from the sea bed.

=== Sightseeing ===
==== Castles ====
It is also a popular tourist destination with attractions such as Inveraray Castle, Dunderave Castle, Kilmory Castle, Minard Castle and the nearby ruins of Castle MacEwen and Old Castle Lachlan around the shores of Loch Fyne.

==== Crarae Garden ====
Crarae Garden located 10 miles south of Inveraray, the National Trust for Scotland gardens overlook Loch Fyne.

==== Inveraray Bell Tower ====
The Loch is overlooked by the 126 feet (38 m) high Inverary Bell Tower, visible from much of the Loch, and is a popular tourist attraction.

== Gallery ==
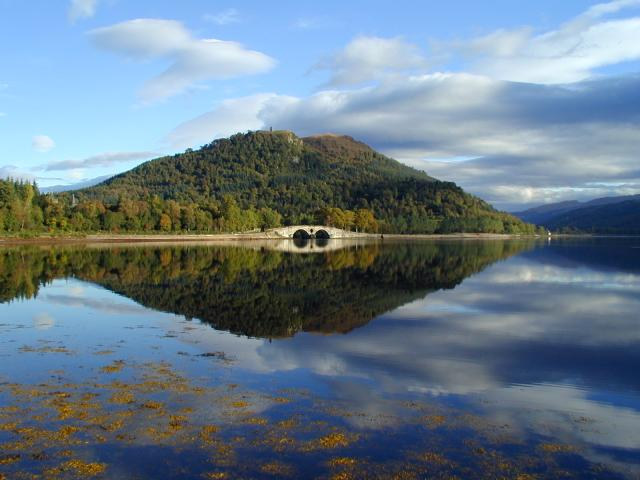
Inveraray Bridge on Loch Fyne. The spires of Inveraray Castle can just be seen on the left.

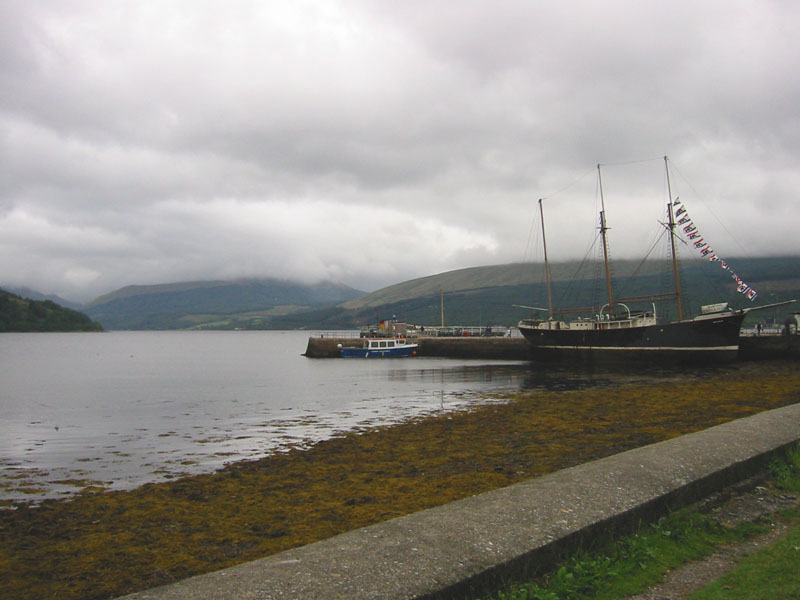
Loch Fyne at Inverary harbour.

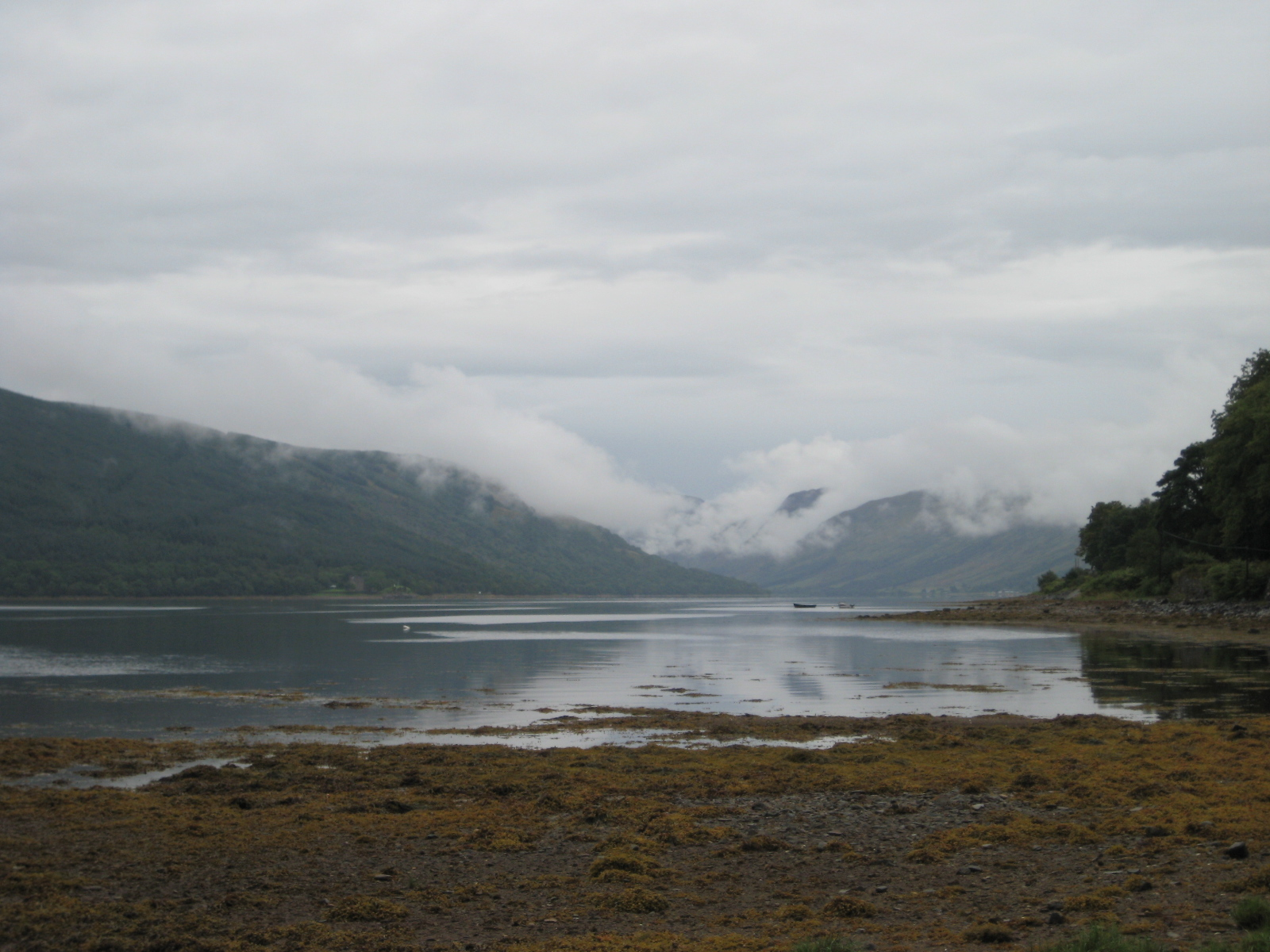
A view towards the north-eastern tip of the loch from St Catherines.

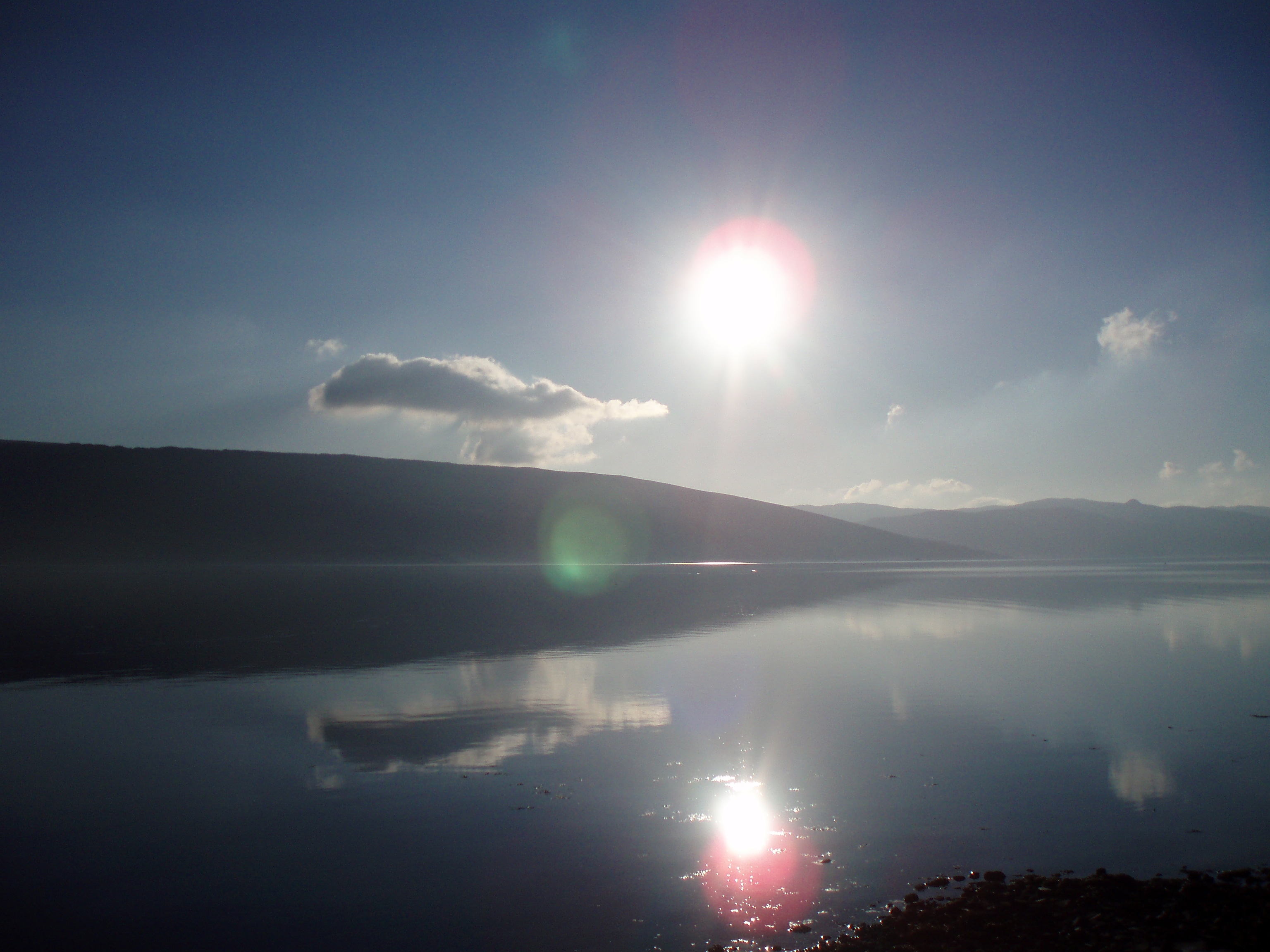
The view down Loch Fyne, from Inveraray. The Fairy Hill can be seen in the distance to the right.

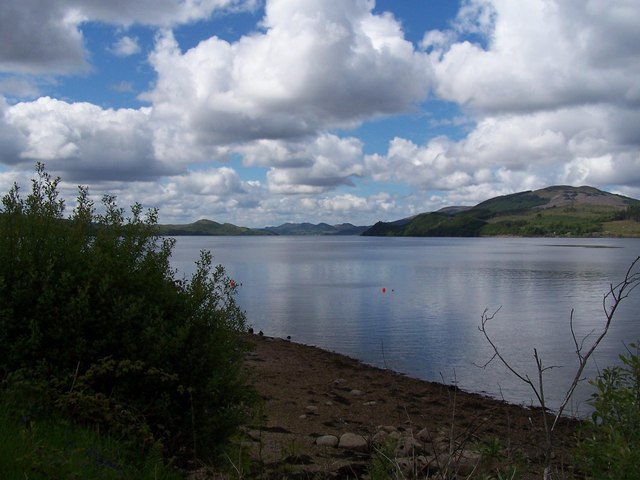
Shoreline and Loch Fyne

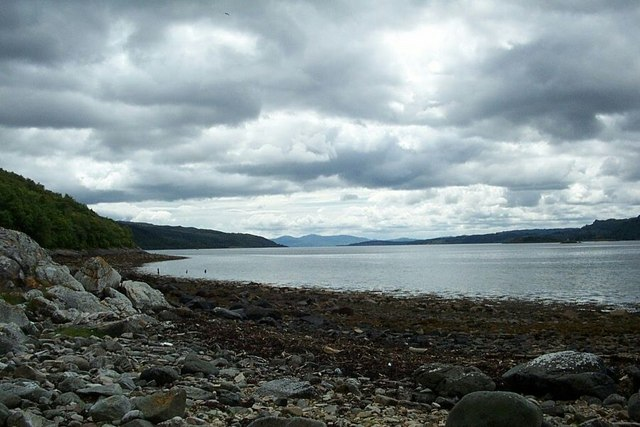
The foreshore of Loch Fyne near Castle Lachlan.

== See also ==
- Ardkinglas Railway
- Loch Fyne (Greenland), a fjord named in 1823 by Douglas Clavering after this loch
