= Tighnabruaich =

Village in Argyll and Bute, Scotland

Coordinates: 55.906685°N 5.2331850°W

Tighnabruaich: Scottish Gaelic: Taigh na Bruaich
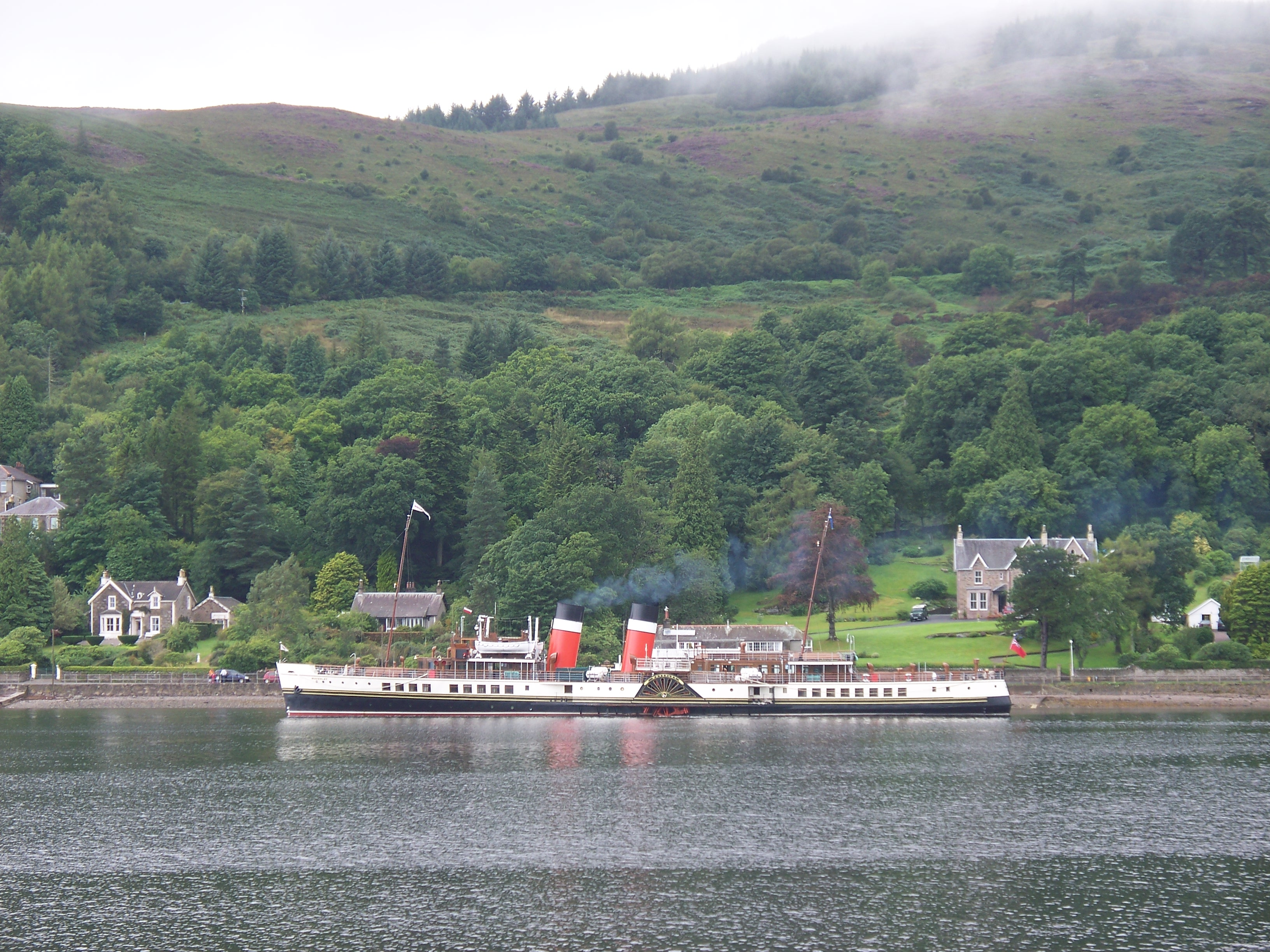
- The PS Waverley at Tighnabruaich (2008)

- Location within Argyll and Bute
- Population: 550 (2020)
- OS grid reference: NR 98000 72900
- Council area: Argyll and Bute
- Lieutenancy area: Argyll and Bute
- Country: Scotland
- Sovereign state: United Kingdom
- Post town: TIGHNABRUAICH
- Postcode district: PA21
- Dialling code: 01700
- Police: Scotland
- Fire: Scottish
- Ambulance: Scottish
- UK Parliament: Argyll, Bute and South Lochaber
- Scottish Parliament: Argyll and Bute

Tighnabruaich (/ˌtaɪnəˈbruːəx/; Scottish Gaelic: Taigh na Bruaich) is a village on the Cowal Peninsula, on the western arm of the Kyles of Bute in Argyll and Bute, west of Scotland. In 2011 the population was 660. It is west of Glasgow and north of the Isle of Arran. Tighnabruaich is Gaelic for "house of the bank".

Tighnabruaich is now part of a continuous coastal strip of housing that joins onto Kames.

== Transport ==
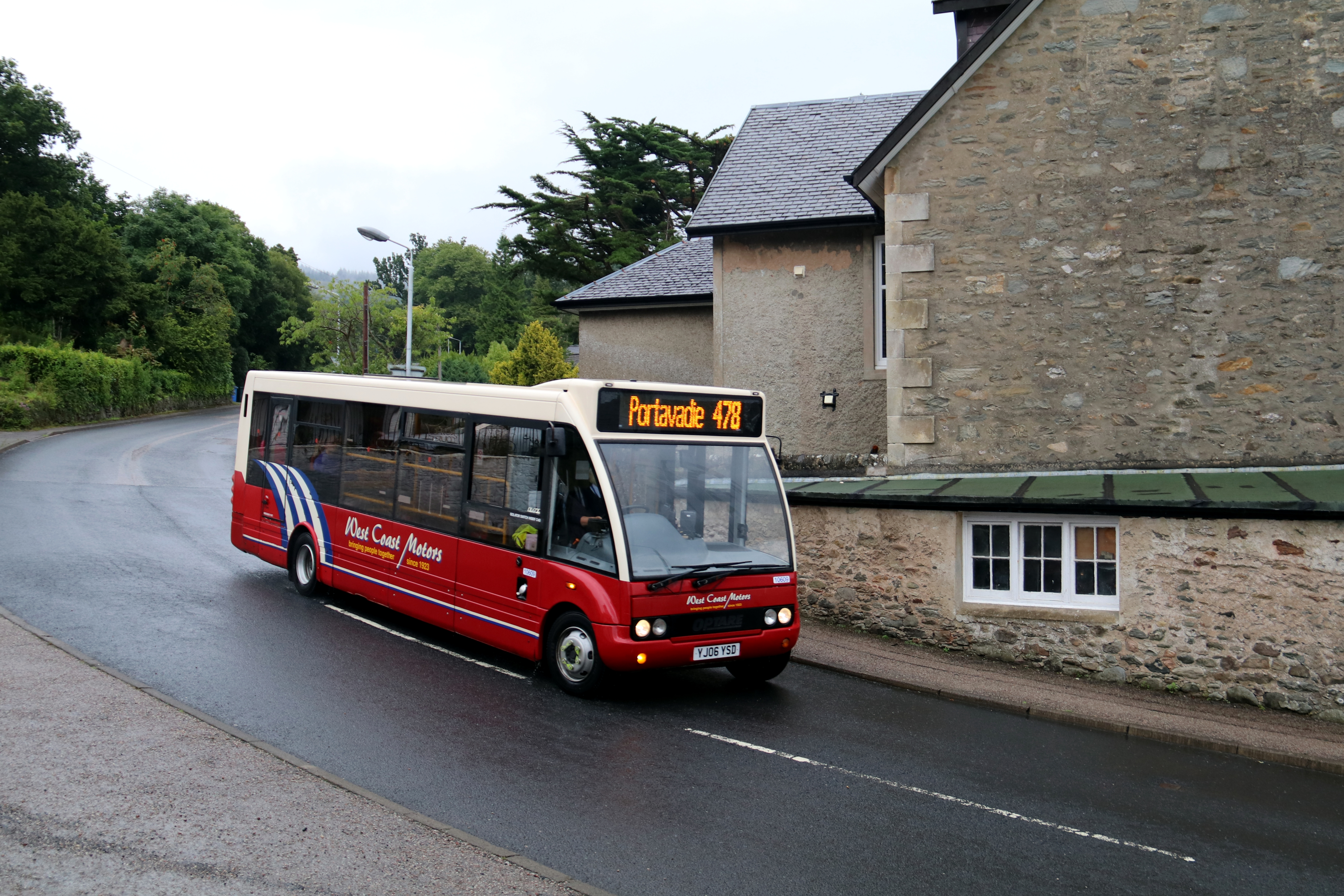
An Optare Solo M880SL running the 478 route in Tighnabruaich in 2006

=== Road ===
Tighnabruaich is on the A8003 road, which is 8 miles (13 kilometres) long and travels to the A886 in the east. The A8003 was built in the 1960s. The B8000 was the original road, which travels down the west coast of the Cowal peninsula from Newton in the north again on the A886, 25 1/2 miles (41 kilometres) away. The village was more reliant on the sea for the transport of passengers and freight until the completion of the shorter A8003.

A CalMac ferry connects Tighnabruaich with Tarbert, Loch Fyne from nearby Portavadie, making it easy to reach the Kintyre Peninsula. A nearby ferry goes from Skipness to Lochranza on the Isle of Arran.

=== Bus ===
Tighnabruaich is served by the 478 Dunoon–Portavadie bus, operated by West Coast Motors.

== History ==
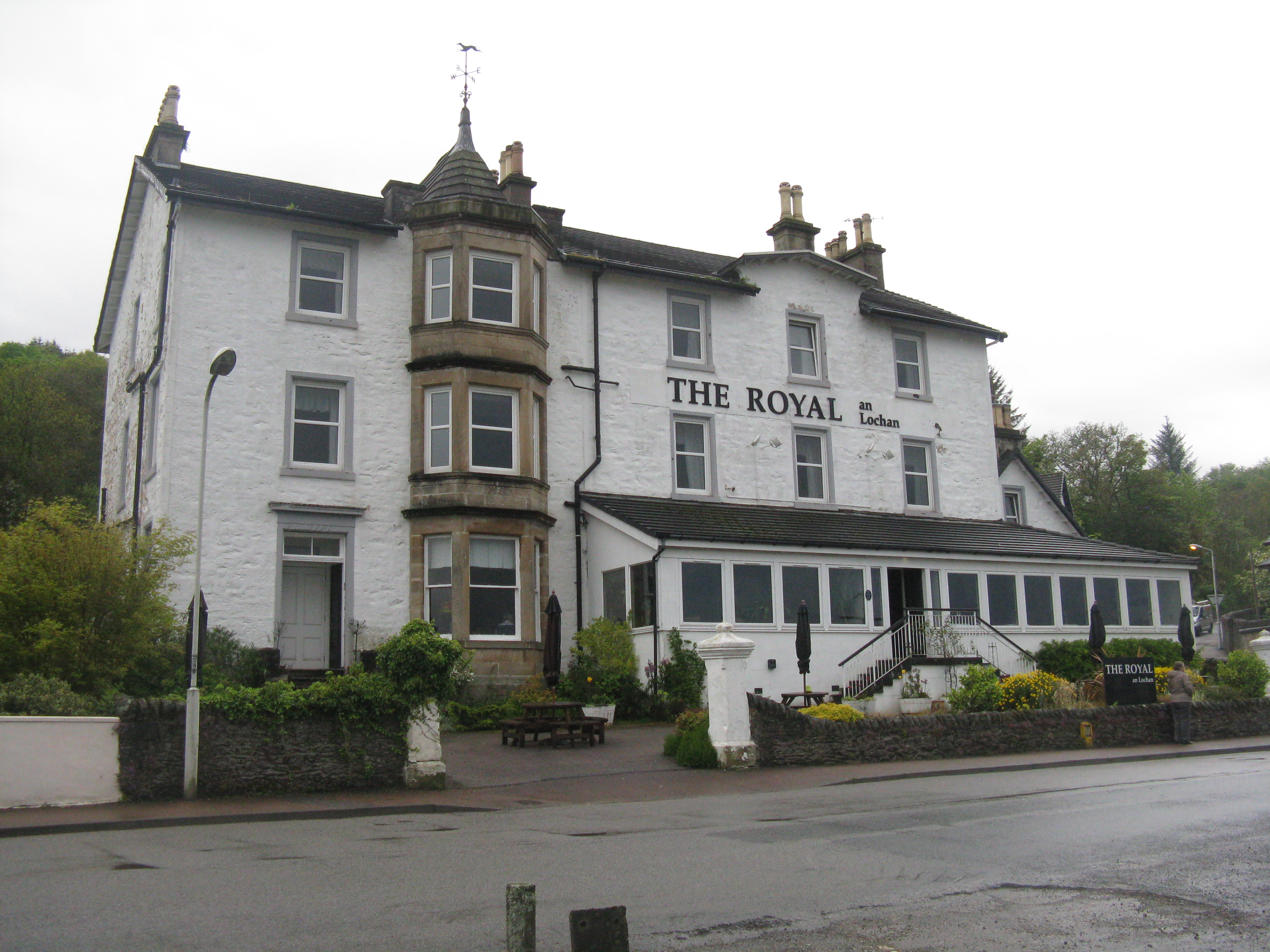
Royal an Lochan hotel (2014)

A pier was possibly built in the 1830s by the Castle Steamship Company, a forerunner of Caledonian MacBrayne. It was a stopping place for paddle steamers and Clyde puffers. The wooden pier was rebuilt in 1885 by the Tighnabruaich Estate who owned it from 1840 until 1950. George Olding owned it until 1965 when it became the responsibility of the local council.

Passenger services on and around the Clyde were developed after the PS Comet was introduced into service in 1812 and tourism developed with the introduction of cruises through the Kyles around Bute, to Arran and along Loch Fyne.

The 1st Glasgow Company of the Boys Brigade own a camp-site near Tighnabruich which is used by many Boys' Brigade Companies from around the country. This follows in the tradition of the 1st Glasgow camping in the area since 1886.

The Royal an Lochan hotel was established in 1865. [2025, currently under new ownership and closed for extensive renovations.]

The Police Station was built in 1896 to the designs of architect Neil Gillies.

== RNLI ==
The Royal National Lifeboat Institution (RNLI) maintains an inshore lifeboat station in Tighnabruaich and currently has an Atlantic 85 type lifeboat (the James and Helen Mason) and tractor on station.

== Sport and leisure ==
=== Kyles Athletic Shinty Club ===
Shinty is the major sport in the village which is home to Kyles Athletic who have won the Camanachd Cup more than any other team apart from Newtonmore and Kingussie.

==== National Cycle Route 75 ====
Tighnabruaich is on the NCR75 a route from Edinburgh to Tarbert on the Kintyre peninsula. The National Cycle Network is maintained by sustrans.

The pier at Tighnabruaich is called at by the paddle steamer Waverley during its summer season sailings on the Firth of Clyde.

Tighnabruaich is popular for sailing and yachting and has a sailing school.

Tighnabruaich was voted "the prettiest village in Argyll, Lomond and Stirlingshire" in 2002 and featured in the More4/Channel 4 programme Penelope Keith's Hidden Villages (Series 3, Episode 2).
