= Portavadie =

Coordinates: 55.8735°N 5.3103°W

Portavadie: Scottish Gaelic: Port a' Mhadaidh
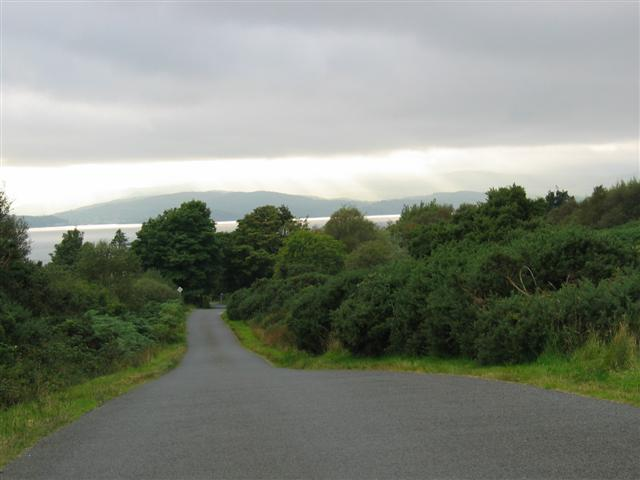
- Road into Portavadie

- Location within Argyll and Bute
- OS grid reference: NR930694
  - Edinburgh: 82 mi (132 km)
  - London: 368 mi (592 km)
- Council area: Argyll and Bute
- Lieutenancy area: Argyll and Bute
- Country: Scotland
- Sovereign state: United Kingdom
- Post town: TIGHNABRUAICH
- Postcode district: PA21
- Dialling code: 01700
- UK Parliament: Argyll, Bute and South Lochaber
- Scottish Parliament: Argyll and Bute

Portavadie (Scottish Gaelic: Port a' Mhadaidh) is a village on the shores of Loch Fyne and the coast of the Cowal Peninsula, in Argyll and Bute, West of Scotland. Portavadie is also the site of a yard built for the construction of oil platforms, which has since been converted into a marina. A ferry service across the loch to the Kintyre Peninsula departs from Portavadie, which is also on a long distance footpath and cycleway.

== Oil rig construction yard ==
The Portavadie complex was built in 1975 by the then Scottish Office for the purpose of constructing concrete platforms for extraction of oil from the North Sea. However, the intention was soon overtaken by acceptance that steel platforms were the future for the oil industry in Scotland.

Despite suggestions to turn the complex into a holiday village, it lay redundant until in the mid-1980s, when the enclosed dock was used by a local fish farm company. In the 2000s, the dock was further reused as a marina.

The nearby housing development built for the yard's workers, known as Polphail, remained unused and derelict. In 2013, it was sold to a forestry company who planned to demolish the buildings and build new houses. By 2016 the buildings had been demolished, but the plans had changed to the construction a whisky distillery on the site, with construction to commence in early 2023.

== Sport and recreation ==
=== Portavadie Marina ===
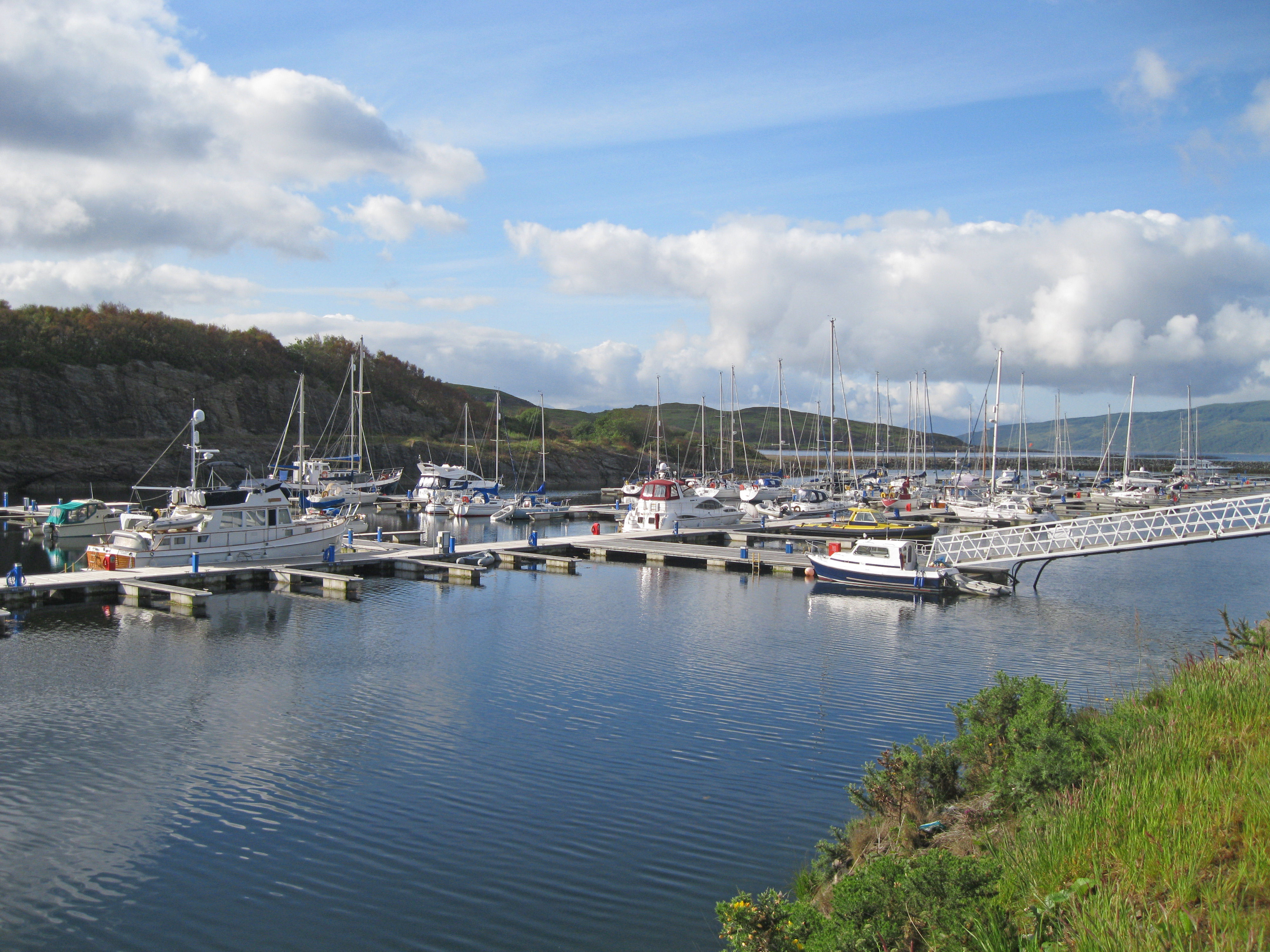
Portavadie Marina

In late 2009 the marina was used for the first time to tie up yachts for the Scottish series by the Clyde Cruising Club, won by Nigel Biggs; England; J109-IRC. The new Portavadie Marina complex opened to the public in 2010.

=== Loch Lomond and Cowal Way ===
The Loch Lomond and Cowal Way starts at Portavadie; this long-distance waymarked footpath takes one to Inveruglas on the shore of Loch Lomond, in the Loch Lomond and The Trossachs National Park, 57 miles (92 kilometres) of walking later.

=== National Cycle Route 75 ===
Portavadie is on the NCR75 a route from Edinburgh to Tarbert on the Kintyre peninsula. The National Cycle Network is maintained by sustrans. If you cross Loch Fyne, continuing on the NCR75 onto the Kintyre peninsula at Tarbert, you can join the National Cycle Route 78 (The Caledonia Way).

== Transport ==
=== Ferry ===
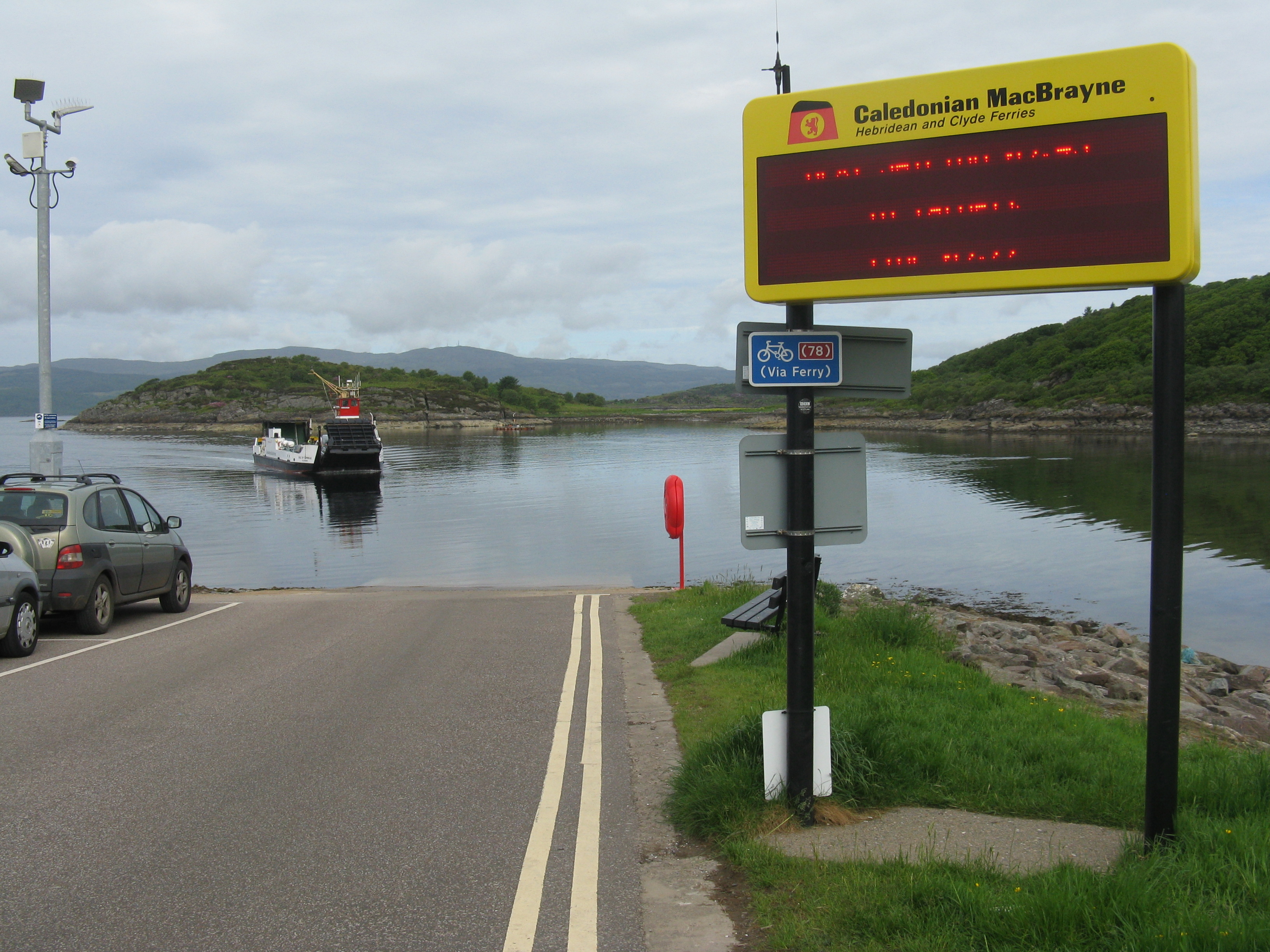
Portavadie ferry terminal, with ferry approaching

A Caledonian MacBrayne car ferry service runs across Loch Fyne from Portavadie to Tarbert on the Kintyre Peninsula. The Portavadie terminal is situated some 500 metres (1,600 ft) to the west of the village. The crossing takes 25 minutes and runs eleven times on weekdays (ten on Sundays), between 8:30 am and 6:30 pm. There is no 8:30 am ferry on Sundays.

Preceding station	Ferry	Following station
Terminus	Caledonian MacBrayne; Ferry	Tarbert

=== Road ===
An unclassified road connects Portavadie to Millhouse, a distance of about 4 kilometres (2.5 mi). From Millhouse, the B8000 provides connections to Dunoon, 45 kilometres (28 mi) away, and Inveraray, 77 kilometres (48 mi) distant.

=== Bus ===
Portavadie is the destination of the 478 bus from Dunoon. It runs to Portavadie six times a day, six days a week.
