= List of castles in Argyll and Bute =

This is a list of castles in Argyll and Bute, Scotland.

== List ==
Name	Type	Date	Condition	Ownership	Location	Notes	Picture
Achallader Castle	Tower house	16th century	Ruined		3.5 miles north of Bridge of Orchy		
Ardencaple Castle		12th century	Demolished	Royal Navy	1.6 km from Helensburgh		
Aros Castle		13th century	Ruined		Isle of Mull, 2 km north of Salen		
Asgog Castle	Tower house (square keep)	15th century	Ruined		Asgog Loch, Millhouse, Cowal peninsula	Coordinates, 194666, 670530: Clan Lamont	Asgog Castle - geograph.org.uk - 992125
Auchenbreck Castle		16th century	No longer standing		Kilmodan, Glendaruel, Cowal peninsula	Clan Campbell	
Barcaldine Castle	Tower house	17th century	In use as a hotel		Loch Creran near Oban		
Calgary Castle	Castellated house	19th century			Calgary, Isle of Mull		
Carnasserie Castle	Tower house	16th century	Ruined	Historic Scotland			
Carrick Castle	Tower House	15th century	Ruined, undergoing restoration	Private	Argyll		
Castle House		19th century			Dunoon		
Castle Stalker	Tower house	15th century	Restored	Private	Loch Laich	Seen in Monty Python and the Holy Grail as "Castle Aaaaarrrrrrggghhh"	
Castle Sween		12th century	Ruined	Historic Scotland	Eastern shore of Loch Sween		
Castle Toward	Baronial house	1820	In use as a residence	Private	Toward, Cowal peninsula		
Claig Castle		Before 17th century	Foundation Ruins		Isle of Fraoch Eilean		
Craignish Castle	Baronial House	16th century or earlier	Rebuilt	Private	Adfern	see Craignish	
Duart Castle		13th century	Restored	Chief of Clan Maclean	Isle of Mull		
Dunans Castle	Baronial house	1860	Partially restored	Private	Glendaruel		
Dunaverty Castle		13th century	Ruined		Kintyre		
Dundarave Castle	L-plan tower house	16th century		Chief of Clan MacNaghten	5 km northeast of Inveraray		
Dunollie Castle	Tower house	13th century	Ruined		Oban		
Dunoon Castle	Motte	13th-century	Ruined	Dunoon	Cowal		The castle hill in Dunoon - geograph.org.uk - 4174577
Dunstaffnage Castle	Castle of enceinte	c. 1220	Ruined	Historic Scotland		Almost entirely 13th century, although the upper gatehouse is late 15th century	
Duntrune Castle	Tower house	13th century	Still in use as a residence	Chief of Clan Malcolm	Argyll	The tower house is a 17th-century addition	
Dunyvaig Castle	Courtyard castle	13th century	Ruined		Islay		
Fincharn Castle		1240	Ruined		Shore of Loch Awe		
Glengorm Castle		1860	In use as a hotel and venue		6 km north of Tobermory		
Gylen Castle	Tower house	1582	Ruined		Kerrera		
Innes Chonnel Castle		13th century	Ruined		Loch Awe		
Inveraray Castle	Castellated house	1746	Still in use as a residence	Duke of Argyll	Inveraray		
Kames Castle	Tower house	14th century	Still in use as a residence	Private	Isle of Bute		
Kilchurn Castle	Tower house	15th century	Ruined	Historic Scotland	Loch Awe		
Kilmahew Castle	Tower house	16th century	Ruined	Roman Catholic Church	Cardross		
Kilmartin Castle	Z-plan tower house	16th century	Restored				
Kilmory Castle	Castellated house	19th century	In use as offices	Argyll County Council	Lochgilphead		
Knockamillie Castle	Tower House	c15th century	Ruin		Innellan, Cowal peninsula		
Lochnell Castle		16th century	Private Residence		Benderloch		
Minard Castle	Castellated house	19th century			Loch Fyne		
Moy Castle		15th century	Ruined		Near Lochbuie, Mull		
New Castle Lachlan	Country house	1790			Strathlachlan		
Old Castle Lachlan		15th century	Ruined		Loch Fyne		
Rothesay Castle	Shell keep	13th century	Ruined	Historic Scotland	Rothesay		Drawing of Rothesay Castle, 1830
Saddell Castle	Tower house	16th century	Restored	Landmark Trust	Shore of Kilbrannan Sound	See Saddell	
Skipness Castle		13th century	Ruined	Historic Scotland	Skipness		
Tarbert Castle		Pre-13th century			South shore of East Loch Tarbert		
Torosay Castle	Baronial house	1858	Unoccupied residence	Private	Isle of Mull		
Torrisdale Castle		1815	In use as a residence	Private	Torrisdale		

== See also ==
- Castles in Scotland
- List of castles in Scotland
- List of listed buildings in Argyll and Bute

== Bibliography ==
- Coventry, Martin (2001) The Castles of Scotland, 3rd Ed. Scotland: Goblinshead ISBN 1-899874-26-7
- Coventry, Martin (2010) Castles of the Clans Scotland: Goblinshead ISBN 1-899874-36-4
- Pattullo, Nan (1974) Castles, Houses and Gardens of Scotland Edinburgh: Denburn Press
