= Dunoon massacre =

Massacre

Coordinates: 55.9460°N 4.9257°W

Dunoon Massacre
- Part of the Scottish Clan Wars
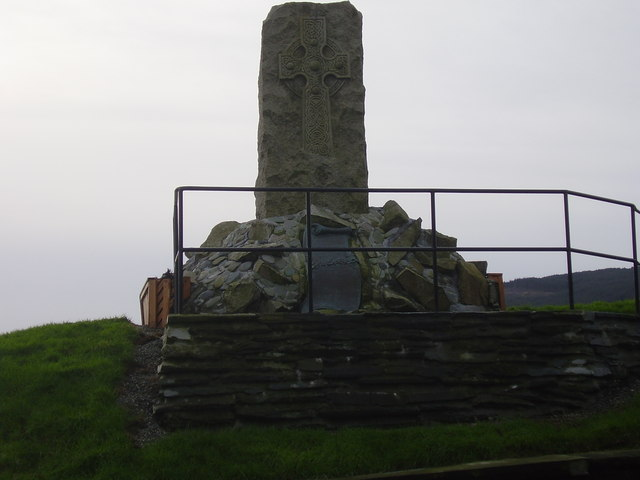
- The Lamont Memorial in Dunoon commemorates the massacre
Date	3 June 1646
Location	Dunoon, Kingdom of Scotland
Result	Campbell Victory

Belligerents
Clan Campbell	Clan Lamont

Commanders and leaders
Unknown	Sir James Lamont

Strength
Unknown	Unknown

Casualties and losses
Unknown	c. 250

The Dunoon massacre was a massacre that took place around Dunoon, Scotland, on 3 June 1646. Men of Clan Campbell massacred men, women and children of the Clan Lamont.

By 1646, the Clan Campbell, neighbours of the Clan Lamont, had steadily encroached the Lamont's lands. After the 1645 Battle of Inverlochy near Fort William, the Clan Lamont took the opportunity to lay waste to the Campbell's territory. The following year, the powerful Clan Campbell army invaded the Clan Lamont lands, taking their castles of Toward on Cowal and Asgog on the banks of Loch Asgog on South West Cowal. At Castle Toward the Campbells asked for hospitality, which was given, according to custom, and then slaughtered the Lamonts in their beds, before throwing bodies down the well to poison the water.

James Lamont surrendered after accepting fair terms for his people, but the Campbells reneged on the terms and took the Lamonts captive. The two castles were set alight and razed, and the prisoners were transported by boat to Dunoon, where the Campbells slaughtered over two hundred of Lamont's men, women and children. Thirty-six men were killed by hanging, while the rest were stabbed to death or buried alive. James Lamont was thrown into a dungeon for five years. This event became known as the Dunoon massacre.

The massacre is commemorated by a memorial in Dunoon, dedicated in 1906 and known as the Clan Lamont Memorial or the Dunoon Massacre Memorial.

== See also ==
- List of massacres in the United Kingdom
