= Clan Maclachlan =

Highland Scottish clan

- Clann Lachlainn, Clann Lachainn
- Motto: Fortis et Fidus (strong and faithful)

Profile
- Region: Highlands
- District: Loch Fyne, Argyll
- Plant badge: Rowan (or mountain ash)
- Pipe music: Moladh Màiri (In Praise of Mary)

Chief
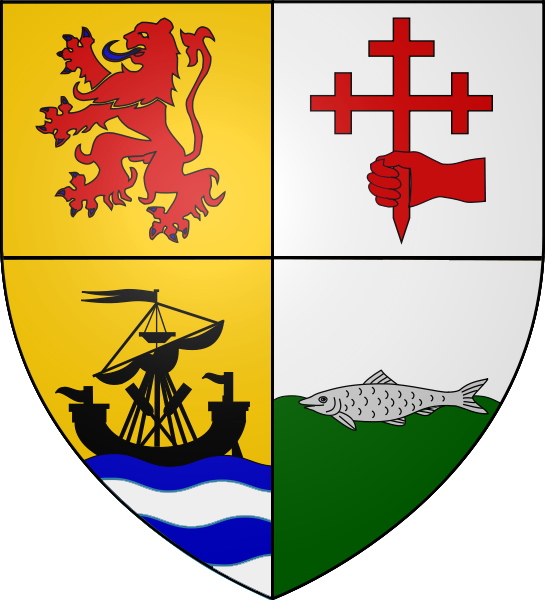
- Euan John Maclachlan of Maclachlan
- 25th of Maclachlan and Baron of Strathlachlan
- Seat: New Castle Lachlan
- Historic seat: Old Castle Lachlan
Clan branches
Maclachlan of Maclachlan (chiefs)
Claflin family (descendants)
Allied clans
Clan Maclean
Clan Campbell (late 15th to early 17th century)
Clan Ewen of Otter
Rival clans
Clan Campbell (late 17th to 18th century)
Clan Lamont

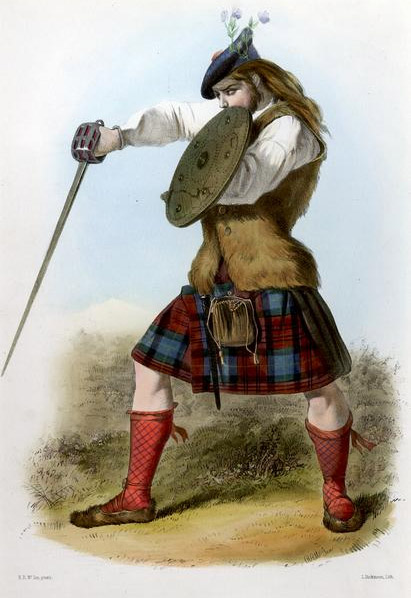
A Victorian-era romanticised depiction of a member of the clan by R. R. McIan, from The Clans of the Scottish Highlands, published in 1845

Clan Maclachlan, also known as Clan Lachlan, Clann Lachainn (Argyll), and Clann Lachlainn, is a Highland Scottish clan that historically centred on the lands of Strathlachlan (Srath Lachainn "Valley of Lachlan") on Loch Fyne, Argyll on the west coast of Scotland. The clan claims descent from Lachlan Mor, who lived on Loch Fyne in the 13th century, and who has left his name upon the countryside he once controlled: places such as Strathlachlan, Castle Lachlan and Lachlan Bay. Tradition gives Lachlan Mor a descent from an Irish prince of the O'Neill dynasty, Ánrothán Ua Néill, son of Áed, son of Flaithbertach Ua Néill, King of Ailech and Cenél nEógain, died 1036. Clan Maclachlan has been associated with other clans, such as Clan Lamont, Clan Ewen of Otter, Clan MacNeil of Barra, and the MacSweens: as all claim descent from Anrothan O'Neill who left Ireland for Kintyre in the 11th century. From this descent the clan claims a further descent from the legendary Niall Noigíallach, High King of Ireland, who lived from the mid 4th century to the early 5th century.

The clan took part in the Jacobite risings as loyal supporters of the Stuart kings of Scotland. The seventeenth chief of the clan was killed in the Battle of Culloden in 1746. Following the Jacobite defeat, a Government warship is said to have damaged the clan seat of old Castle Lachlan.

Today the clan is alive and lives as the Clan Maclachlan Society and the Lachlan Trust. The Lachlan Trust is a registered Scottish charitable organisation which takes donations to preserve the heritage of Clan Maclachlan. The Clan Maclachlan Society consists of eight branches around the world, including Australia, Britain & Ireland, Canada, New Zealand, and the United States of America.

== History ==
=== Origins ===
Clan Maclachlan claims descent from Lachlan Mor, who lived on the shores of Loch Fyne in the 13th century. Lachlan belonged to the family who originally emigrated from Ireland to Scotland in the 11th century, see Irish clan McLaughlin (surname). The progenitor of this family, Anrothan, son of Aodh O'Neil, king of the north of Ireland, is said to have married the heiress of the King of Scots and gained lands campaigning there. Moncreiffe wrote that it was more likely Anrothan married a daughter of the local king of Argyll or a sub-king of Cowal and through this marriage, Anrothan's descendants gained control of the lands of Knapdale and Cowal. Several Scottish clans claim a descent from Anrothan, including Clan MacNeil of Barra, Clan Lamont, Clan MacEwen of Otter, and the MacSweens who became the Irish Sweeney Clan who left Scotland and returned to Ireland in the 14th century as leaders of Gallowglass. Lachlan's mother was Elizabeth of the Clan Lamont, who was also a descendant of Somerled.

=== Early history ===
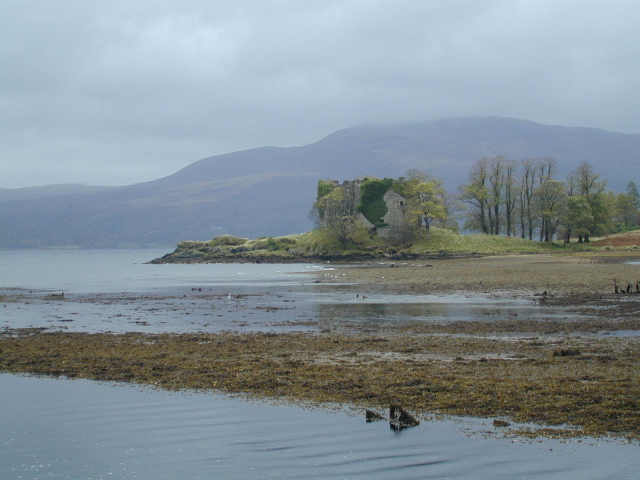
Ruinous Old Castle Lachlan, overlooking Lachlan Bay on Loch Fyne. The castle was built sometime in the 15th century, and finally abandoned in the 18th century.

In about 1230 Gilchrist Maclachlan was witness to a charter of Kilfinan granted by Laumanus, ancestor of Clan Lamont. The first documentary evidence of the clan's ownership of lands was recorded in 1292, when Gilleskel Maclauchlan received a charter of his lands in Ergadia from John, King of Scots.

According to the historian G. W. S. Barrow, Gillespie Maclachlan appears in the Ragman Rolls, when the magnates of Scotland signed their allegiance to Edward I of England, in 1296, "clerks of this period writing Anglo-French documents often had difficulty with the name Lachlan, and rendered it by some form of the more familiar name Rothland, or Roland. Thus, unnoticed by historians of Clan Lachlan, Gillespie MacLachlan figures on the Ragman Roll as 'Gilascope fiz Rouland, de counte de Perth'".

Sometime between 1306 and 1322 Gillespie received, in charter from Robert I of Scotland, the ten pennyland of "Schyrwaghthyne" (Strathlachlan) and other lands. He also appears on the list of Scottish magnates who sat at the first Parliament of the king of Scots at St Andrews, in 1309. Gillespie was one of the sixteen Scottish magnates who signed a letter to Philip IV of France in 1309. The King of France had asked for Scottish assistance in a Crusade he was forming, with the Scots answering that they were at war with England and had their hands full. His name appears on one of the seal tags with that letter, though the actual seal that had been attached to the tag has since been lost.

In 1314 "Guyllascop Maclouchlan in Ergadia" (Gillespie Maclachlan of Argyll) granted forty shillings sterling to the Preaching Friars of Glasgow, the sum of which were to be paid from his pennylands of Killbride near Castle Lachlan. ("juxta castrum meum quod dicitur Castellachlan"). Gillespie was dead by 1322 and was succeeded by Patrick his brother. Patrick married a daughter of James the Steward of Scotland, and had a son, Lachlan, who later succeeded him. In 1410 Iain Maclachlan, lord of Strathlachlan, ("Johonne Lachlani domino de Straithlaon"), witnessed a Lamont charter. In 1456 Lachlan's son, "Donaldus Maclachlane dominus de Ardlawan" ("Ardlachlan", or Castle Lachlan), like his ancestor Gillespie, granted the Preaching Friars of Glasgow six shillings and eight pence per year, from the same pennylands of Killbride beside his home Castle Lachlan.

One tradition of the Maclachlan lairds was thought to date from the era of the Crusades. The tradition was that the laird of Strathlachlan (Maclachlan of Strathlachlan) and the laird of Strachur (Campbell of Strachur) would attend the funerals of each other and "lay his neighbour's head in the grave". This tradition was thought to originate from the Crusades because, "it is said the heads of these two families went together to the war, and each solemnly engaged with the other to lay him in his family burying-place if he should fall in battle".

=== Late 15th century onwards ===
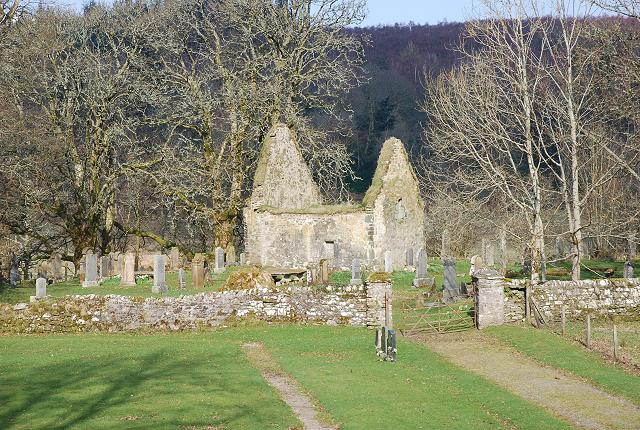
Kilmorie Chapel following renovations in 2006. It is located between the old and new Castle Lachlan, and is the traditional burying ground of the chiefs of Clan Maclachlan.

In 1487 Iain Maclachlan of Strathlachlan, witnessed a bond by Dougall Stewart of Appin to Colin Campbell, 1st Earl of Argyll. Iain died sometime around 1509 and his son Gillescop (or alternately Archibald) married a daughter of Iain Lamont of Inveryne, the chief of Clan Lamont. Iain was succeeded by his son, Lachlan, who later on forcibly ejected Archibald Lamont of Stroiog from his lands. For this, the Maclachlan chief was summoned before the Privy Council, which ruled that even though Lachlan claimed Lamont lands through his maternal grandfather (the chief of Clan Lamont), that a Lamont heir was preferable to a Maclachlan heir. Lachlan died sometime between 1557 and 1559, and was succeeded by his second son, Archibald. In 1587, the chief of the clan, "M'Lauchlane", appears on the roll of names of the landlords in the highlands and the isles, on whose land broken men dwelt. Archibald had only daughters and in turn was succeeded by his nephew Lachlan Og ("Lauchlane oig Macklauchlane his brothers sone").

Not long after assuming the chiefship, Lachlan Og was forced to resign some of his lands to the chief of the Lamonts, because of the murder of Robert Lamont of Silvercrags by Lachlan Maclachlan of Dunnamuch. Lachlan Og led the clan in the Archibald Campbell, 7th Earl of Argyll's campaign against Sir James Macdonald of Islay and his rebellion in 1615.

Lachlan Maclachlan of that Ilk was succeeded by his son Archibald, who is reckoned as the fifteenth chief of the clan. In 1680 Archibald had his lands erected into a barony by Charles II of England called the Barony of Strathlachlan which was centred on Castle Lachlan. To this day the chief of the clan is styled as Baron of Strathlachlan.

=== Jacobite Risings ===
The Maclachlans were loyal Jacobites. They were said to have been present at the Battle of Killiecrankie in 1689. In the Jacobite Rising of 1715 Lachlan Maclachlan of that Ilk "signed the Address of Welcome to the Old Chevalier, the rightful King James VIII Stuart, on his landing in Scotland". Archibald Brown, in The History of Cowal, wrote, "The chief of MacLachlan appeared with the Earl of Mar at Sheriffmuir as Colonel in the Pretender's army, and for this act it is said Campbell of Ardkinglas followed MacLachlan like a sleuthhound for five years and shot him dead in 1720".

Lachlan, the seventeenth chief of Clan Maclachlan played a part in the Jacobite Rising of 1745, and lost his life leading the clan at the Battle of Culloden. Lord President Duncan Forbes estimated that the Maclachlan force of that time was about 200 men. In 1748, Rev. John MacLachlan of Kilchoan, in a letter to Rev. Robert Forbes, wrote,

I hope you'll take notice of Collonel MacLachlan of that Ilk, whom the newspapers and magazines neglected. 'Tis true he got but few of his clan rais'd, because most of them are situated amidst the Campbells. However he attended the Prince at Gladsmuir, and march'd with him to Carlyle, from whence he was detach'd by the Prince with an ample commission and 16 horses to lead on to England the 3,000 men that lay then at Perth... ...The Collonel join'd us again at Stirlin, and when we retir'd to Inverness the Prince made him Commissary of the army. At the battle of Culloden he had a regiment of 300 men, whereof 115 were his own people and 182 were Mackleans, who chose to be under his command, seeing their chief was not there. The said Collonel being the last that received orders from the Prince on the field of battle, he was shot by a cannonball as he was advancing on horseback to lead on his regiment, which was drawn up between the Macintoshes and the Stewarts of Appin.

Following the Jacobite defeat a Government ship sailed up Loch Fyne and shelled Castle Lachlan, forcing the chief's family to abandon their residence, and in Edinburgh the Maclachlan colours were burned on the orders of the Duke of Cumberland. It had been assumed that the chiefs lands had been forfeited for his support of the Young Pretender and the Jacobite cause, but it was ruled that he had been killed before he could be attainted. The chief of the Campbells, the Archibald Campbell, 3rd Duke of Argyll, who although helped crush the Jacobite forces, aided Donald, son of the deceased Maclachlan chief, and helped save his lands. On 12 February 1747 Donald Maclachlan of that Ilk received a charter for his lands "at the intercession of the Duke of Argyll", though it was considerably unpopular decision at the time, and Maclachlan's estates were "surveyed but afterwards found not to be forfeited".

=== The modern clan ===
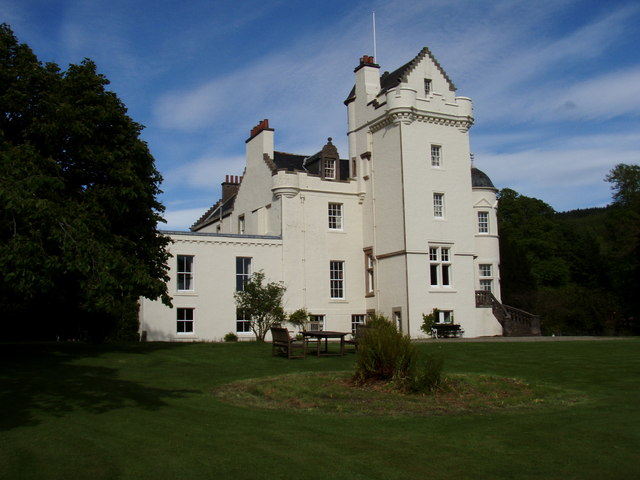
New Castle Lachlan, the residence of the current chief of the clan. This 18th century 'castle' has been divided, with the chief renting out half.

In the early 19th century, a new Castle Lachlan was built for the chiefs of the clan, and it remains the seat of the clan to this day. The last of the male line chiefs of Clan Maclachlan was John Maclachlan who died in 1942. He was succeeded by his daughter, the twenty-fourth chief of the clan, Marjorie Maclachlan of Maclachlan. Under her the Clan Maclachlan Society was formed in 1979, and on her death in 1996, she was succeeded by her eldest son Euan John Maclachlan of Maclachlan, Chief of Clan Maclachlan, 25th of Maclachlan and Baron of Strathlachlan, who is a member of the Standing Council of Scottish Chiefs.

Today the clan is alive and lives as the Clan Maclachlan Society and the Lachlan Trust. The Clan Maclachlan Society consists of eight branches around the world, including Australia, Britain & Ireland, Canada, New Zealand, and the United States of America. The Lachlan Trust is a registered Scottish charitable organisation which takes donations to preserve the heritage of Clan Maclachlan. The trust, in part with Historic Scotland and the Heritage Lottery Fund, helped raise £100,000 for the preservation of Kilmorie Chapel, the traditional burying place of the chiefs. The project was completed in 2006, as a memorial to the twenty-fourth chief (the present chief's mother). Further funding from Historic Scotland and the Heritage Lottery Fund has since been approved for the conservation of the old castle and the construction of a new footbridge over the River Lachlan. Work began in the spring of 2013 with the erection of scaffolding around the west corner of the old castle. The plan is to develop the site for the enjoyment of visitors, with improved pathways, a nature trail and information points about the heritage of the area.

== Castle Lachlan ==
Old Castle Lachlan lies on the eastern shore of Loch Fyne, near Newton. The ruinous castle dates to the 15th century, and lies about 70 feet (21.3 m) north to south, 54 feet (16.5 m) east to west, and at its highest point 43 feet (13.1 m) high.

In the late 18th century, Donald Maclachlan oversaw the construction of New Castle Lachlan, a mansion which stands about a ten-minute walk away from the ruinous old castle. This new house was first built in the Queen Anne Style, then later at the end of the 19th century it was transformed into the Scottish baronial house that stands today. The building, upon the 1,500 acres (2.3 sq mi; 6.1 km^{2}) estate, has been divided in two with the chief residing in one part and the second available for rent.

== Clan profile ==
=== Clan chief ===
The current chief of Clan Maclachlan is Euan John Maclachlan of Maclachlan, Chief of Clan Maclachlan, 25th of Maclachlan and Baron of Strathlachlan. The chief's seat is new Castle Lachlan.

=== Origin of the name ===
Clan Maclachlan claims as its eponymous ancestor Lachlan Mor. The surname Maclachlan is an Anglicised form of the Gaelic Mac Lachlainn which is the patronymic form of the Gaelic personal name Lochlann meaning "stranger". Lochlann was originally a term to describe Scandinavia, composed of the elements loch (meaning "lake" or "fjord") + lann (meaning "land").

=== Clan symbolism ===
Members of Scottish clans show their allegiance to their clan and chief by wearing crest badges. These are usually worn on a bonnet. Crest badges are usually made up of the chief's heraldic crest surrounded by a strap and buckle with the chief's heraldic motto or slogan. The crest badge used by members of Clan Maclachlan contains the Latin motto FORTIS ET FIDUS, which translates to "strong and faithful". The blazon of the crest within the badge is (Issuant from a crest coronet of four (three visible) strawberry leaves Or) a castle set upon a rock all Proper. Another clan symbol used to show a clan member's affiliation is a clan badge or plant badge. Consisting of a particular plant, these badges are sometimes said to be the original means of identification used by Scottish clans. Clan Maclachlan has two clan badges attributed to it. These include: rowan (or mountain ash) and lesser periwinkle.

Many clans are also attributed pipe tunes. Clan Maclachlan's pipe music is Moladh Màiri (translation from Gaelic: "In Praise of Mary").

=== Tartans ===
Tartan image	Notes
	The most common "Maclachlan" tartan today. Standard, or Modern. The most popular MacLachlan tartan today. First published in Smibert's The Clans of the Highlands in 1850, though "it would appear to have a longer history than might be gathered from the date of its registration".
	The Clanlavchlan (Clan MacLachlan) tartan as published in the dubious Vestiarium Scoticum, first published in 1845. Dress tartan. The Vestiarium, shown to be a forgery, is the source of many of today's clan tartans.
	Maclachlan hunting tartan, first published in 1893. Maclachlan hunting, or Old MacLachlan. This sett appears in the Collection of the Highland Society, 1812. Although one of the oldest tartans this sett has never been very popular with the clan.
	Old Maclachlan tartan. Small MacLachlan, or Old Maclachlan, also known as Moncreiffe. This tartan was in the Wilsons of Bannockburn pattern book of 1790, listed as # 66. Over time the tartan had become associated with the Maclachlans. In 1974 the chief of Clan Moncreiffe, Sir Iain Moncreiffe of that Ilk, asked the 24th chief of Clan Maclachlan, Madam Maclachlan of Maclachlan, to be assigned the right to use this tartan, as the colours of it matched the colours in his Coat of Arms. Today it is known as a Moncreiffe tartan.

== See also ==
- Claflin family
- Scottish clan
- Lochlann, description and history of the word that the surname Maclachlan is derived from
- Harriet Maclachlan (Mrs Alexander Campbell of Possil), elder daughter of Donald Maclachlan, painted by Sir Henry Raeburn.
