= Castle Lachlan =

Castle Lachlan may refer to:

- New Castle Lachlan, an 18th-century baronial mansion on the Cowal Peninsula, Argyll and Bute, Scotland
- Old Castle Lachlan, a ruined 15th-century castle on the Cowal Peninsula, Argyll and Bute, Scotland
