= Clan Lamont =

Highland Scottish clan

- Clann Laomainn
- Crest: A dexter hand couped at the wrist; all proper
- Motto: Ne Parcas nec Spernas (Neither spare nor spurn)

Profile
- Region: Highland
- District: Cowal
- Plant badge: Crab-apple tree, Trefoil, or Dryas

Chief
- The Rev. Fr. Peter Noel Lamont of that Ilk
- Chief of the Name and Arms of Lamont
- Historic seat: Toward Castle
Clan branches
Lamonts of Ardlamont
McSorley Lamonts of Monydrain
McPhadrick Lamonts of Coustoun
Lamonts of Stallaig
Lamonts of Rudhbodach
Lamonts of Auchinshelloch
Lamonts of Ascog
Lamonts of Stronalbanach
Lamonts of Silvercraigs
McGorrie Lamonts of Knockdow
Lamonts of Auchagoyl
Lamont de Lacerda of Carrick Castle
Lamont-Campbells of Possil
Allied clans
Clan MacDougall
Clan MacGregor
Clan MacDonald
Clan MacLeod
Clan MacLean
Clan Stewart
Clan Graham
Rival clans
Clan Wallace
Clan Bruce
Clan Campbell

Clan Lamont (Scottish Gaelic: Clann Laomainn [ˈkʰl̪ˠãũn̪ˠ ˈl̪ˠɯːmɪɲ]) is a Highland Scottish clan. The clan is said to descend from Ánrothán Ua Néill, an Irish prince of the O'Neill dynasty, and through him Niall Noigíallach, High King of Ireland. Clan Ewen of Otter, Clan MacNeil of Barra, Clan Lachlan, and Clan Sweeney are also descendants of Ánrothán. Traditional genealogy would therefore include Clan Lamont among the descendants of Conn Cétchathach.

Clan Lamont ruled most of the Cowal peninsula in Argyll for centuries. However, the clan's standing was damaged by the Dunoon Massacre in 1646, when Campbell clansmen killed around 200 Lamont clansmen. Many Lamonts moved, particularly to the Scottish Lowlands. Today, Lamonts are widespread in Canada, Australia, Britain and other countries.

The 29th and current hereditary chief of Clan Lamont is the Roman Catholic priest Rev. Fr. Peter Lamont, Chief of the Name and Arms of Lamont. Most Lamonts have remained Catholic.

== History ==
The surname Lamont is derived from Lagman (Lawspeaker) which is from the Old Norse Logmaðr. The Old Norse name Logmaðr is composed to two elements: log which is plural of lag meaning "law" + maðr meaning "man".

The Red Hand of Ulster symbolises both the Irish province of Ulster and the Uí Néill dynasty.

=== Origins ===
Around the year 500, the Irish kingdom of Dal Riata emigrated from Ulster to southwestern Scotland. Based on oral traditions, this invasion into Scottish territory was led by the three sons of Erc, the King of Dal Riata. It was during this "building stage" of the Scottish Kingdom of Dalriada that the Stone of Destiny and the Coronation Stone were brought by the Gaels into Argyll. The Coronation Stone was later brought to Scone, the capital of the Southern Picts. It was there that the Picts and Scots became unified in 844 under the guidance of Kenneth MacAlpine.

Anrothan O'Neill, an Irish prince from the O'Neill dynasty, took advantage of this new Scottish kingdom and gave up his rulership in Ireland to settle down in Argyll. From Anrothan's line came a prominent lord named Aodha Alainn O'Neil, who had three sons: Gillachrist, Neill, and Dunslebhe. Gillachrist's son, Lachlan, founded Clan MacLachlan, and Gillachrist's brother, Neill, founded Clan MacNeil of Barra. Dunslebhe had two sons: Ewen and Fearchar. Ewen founded Clan Ewen of Otter, and Fearchar's grandson founded Clan Lamont.

Until the 13th century, Clan Lamont was known as MacKerracher in honor of Fearchar. In 1235, however, Sir Laumon signed a charter granting lands to Paisley Abbey. From Laumon comes the modern name "Lamont", and the clan became known as such. His descendants, the early chiefs of the clan, were described as "The Great MacLamont of all Cowal" (Scottish Gaelic: Mac Laomain mor Chomhail uile).

=== Wars of Scottish Independence ===
During the Wars of Scottish Independence, Sir John Lamont, Laumon's grandson and the Chief of the clan, sided with the MacDougalls of Lorne against Robert the Bruce. The MacDougall bid for the throne was foiled, and the Lamonts suffered along with their allies. Once Robert the Bruce was firmly situated on the throne, he and his line took vengeance against the clans that had opposed him. In 1371, Robert II gave the Lamont hereditary seat at Dunoon to Bruce supporter Sir Colin Campbell, Black Knight of Loch Awe.

By the end of the 14th century, almost all of Clan Lamont's original Cowal territory had been lost to the Campbells. In spite of considerable intermarriage between Clan Campbell and Clan Lamont, the relations between Campbell clansmen and Lamont clansmen remained harsh and bitter.

=== 15th century ===
In 1400, three courtiers of King Robert II took advantage of their lord's absence to Rothesay Castle. Crossing into Cowal on a hunting trip, they encountered and raped three Lamont women. In a rage, Lamont clansmen caught up with the three courtiers and brutally murdered them. The incident was passed along to the King, who punished Clan Lamont by rescinding nearly eight square miles of their lands in Strath Echaig and granting them to the Campbells.

As a result of this increasing lordship of Lamont lands, Clan Campbell became even more bold in asserting their power over Argyll, and more specifically, Cowal. Whether by force or through sheer kindness, in 1442 the chief of Clan Lamont gave permission for the eldest son of Sir Duncan Campbell to be buried at the ancient Kirk of Kilmun on the Holy Loch, which was within the confines of Lamont territory. The Highlands were impassable because of snowfall, and those conditions led to the request. After this, Campbell petitioned the Pope to found a Collegiate Church on the site. The Pope conceded, and Sir Duncan Campbell endowed the site. He turned the Kirk into a burial place for Campbell chiefs, and it remains so even to the current day.

In 1472, Clan Campbell received charter for the lands around Dunoon, and they proceeded to turn the castle into their main seat.

=== 16th century ===
Regardless of the fierce rivalry between the two clans, Clan Campbell and Clan Lamont allied together in 1544, unsuccessfully, to defeat an English expedition sailing through the Firth of Clyde into Scotland. Henry VIII wished to kidnap the infant Mary, Queen of Scots and raise her to marry his heir. Although the Campbell/Lamont alliance failed to stop the English force, the fighting gave the Earl of Lennox enough time to escort Mary to Stirling Castle and save the House of Stuart.

=== 17th century ===
==== MacGregor hospitality ====
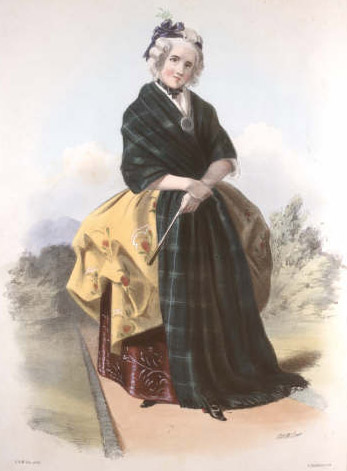
A Victorian era print of the Lamont tartan from The Clans of the Scottish Highlands by R. R. McIan, published in 1845.

A tradition of Highland hospitality and chivalry concerns Clan Lamont and Clan Gregor. The story is supposed to take place around the year 1600. The son of the chief of Clan Lamont and the only son of MacGregor of Glenstrae, chief of Clan Gregor, went hunting together on the shores of Loch Awe. After the two men had made camp at nightfall they eventually became embroiled in a quarrel at the end of which Lamont grabbed his dirk and MacGregor was mortally wounded. Lamont then fled, hotly pursued by MacGregor's furious retainers, until losing his way and eventually making it to the house of the MacGregor chief himself. On hearing that Lamont was fleeing for his life, MacGregor promised the lad protection. Soon, though, the old MacGregor guessed it was his own son who had been slain, but considered himself bound to the Highland laws of hospitality, saying "Here this night you shall be safe". With the arrival of the furious MacGregor clansman who pursued the young Lamont, the MacGregor chief was true to his word and protected Lamont from his clansmen's vengeance. Later, while it was still dark, the chief had Lamont personally conducted to Dunderave on Loch Fyne and provided him with a boat and oars. The chief bid him leave quickly, saying "Flee for your life; in your own country we shall pursue you. Save yourself if you can!"

Years later, a ragged man appeared at Toward Castle desperately seeking shelter. The man was MacGregor of Glenstrae who had been stripped of lands and possessions by the Campbells and was fleeing for his life. The Lamont chief remembered the honourable deed of MacGregor, and offered him protection and provision. The old MacGregor lived with Lamont for years until his death, and was buried in honour in the graveyard at the chapel of St. Mary on the farm of Toward-an-Uilt.

==== Wars of the Three Kingdoms and the Dunoon Massacre ====
The darkest era of Clan Lamont was undoubtedly during the mid 17th century. The brutal Covenanter wars and the Wars of the Three Kingdoms threatened to tear Scotland apart. Clan Lamont's participation in these wars began with their alliance with the Campbells but ended in what is now known as the Dunoon Massacre.

The chief of the clan during this time was Sir James Lamont of that Ilk. In 1634, Sir James represented the Barons of Argyll in Parliament, although two years later, he was discovered plotting for the Royalist cause with other clan chiefs: Macdonald of Sleat, Macleod of Dunvegan, Maclean of Duart, Stuart of Bute, and Stewart of Ardgowan. Once the Marquess of Argyll (the chief of Clan Campbell) found out Lamont was forced to recant his position, he was furious.

With the start of the following Wars of the Three Kingdoms, Lamont was sent a charter by King Charles I to crush the rebels, the Campbells. Even though the Lamont chief was a Royalist sympathizer and wished to obey Charles, he had no choice but to join forces with the superior Marquess of Argyll. After the Covenanter loss at the Battle of Inverlochy, Sir James was released by the Royalist victors and was able to side with the Marquess of Montrose and actively support the Royalist cause. Lamont then joined forces with Alasdair MacColla and invaded the lands of the Campbells. Sir James' brother, Archibald, led a force of Lamonts across Loch Long and, together with MacColla's Irish contingent, landed at the Point of Strone. Their force then laid waste to large areas under Campbell control. The Lamonts were particularly brutal in North Cowal, and singled out Dunoon because of its sore history as a Lamont stronghold that was unlawfully seized by the power-hungry Campbells. During the destruction their forces wrought on the Campbells, MacColla's men committed many atrocities, and even the Lamonts themselves took part in the brutal slaughter when they attacked the Tower of Kilmun. Once the tower had surrendered under promise of their lives being spared, the prisoners were then "taken thrie myles from the place and most cruelly put to Death, except one who was in the hot fever". Sir James Lamont ravaged the lands of Strachur, killing thirty-three men, women and children. His force destroyed much grain and drove off 340 cattle and horses.

Several months later in May 1646, while the Lamonts were home at castles of Toward and Ascog, they were besieged by Campbell forces seeking revenge. By 1 June 1646 the Campbells brought cannon forward to shell the Lamont strongholds. Two days later Sir James Lamont, in a written agreement of quarter and liberty for himself and his followers, surrendered and persuaded the other garrison at Ascog Castle to likewise lay down arms and surrender to the Campbells. Although the Campbells had agreed to the Lamonts terms of surrender, they immediately took the surrendered garrisons to Dunoon by boat. The Lamont strongholds were then looted and burnt to the ground. Sir James and his closest kin were shipped to Inveraray Castle, although he was held in the dungeons of Dunstaffnage Castle for the next five years. At Inverary, Sir James was forced to sign over all of the Lamont lands to Clan Campbell. In the churchyard at Dunoon, about a hundred Lamonts were sentenced to death and executed. Thirty-six of the clan's high-ranking gentlemen were hanged from a tree in the churchyard, cut down and then buried either dead or alive in a common grave. After languishing in captivity for years, Sir James Lamont was brought to Stirling Castle in 1651 to answer for his actions with Alasdair MacColla for their devastations in Argyll. Lamont was eventually spared trial though, when King Charles II led his ill-fated Scots forces into England to be later defeated at the Battle of Worcester. Lamont was finally released when the forces of Oliver Cromwell took Stirling. Cromwell's triumph also invalidated the "contract" that Sir James was forced to sign in captivity, and Clan Lamont regained its lands. It has been reputed that the total damage inflicted by the Campbells upon the Lamont estates was in excess of £600,000 Scots (£50,000 sterling). Argyll himself was able to recover £2,900 Scots (almost £245 sterling) for the entertainment and lodging of the Lamont chief while in captivity.

In 1661, the ringleader of the Dunoon Massacre, Sir Colin Campbell, was brought to justice. He stood trial on charges of High Treason, was found guilty, and then beheaded.

=== 18th century ===
Clan Lamont, though they still retained their lands, were functionally incapacitated in the 18th century. Their holdings in Cowal were surrounding by strong Campbell fortresses, and thus, the largely Roman Catholic Lamonts were unable to travel north and participate in the Jacobite Rising of 1715 or the Jacobite Rising of 1745. Since the Lamonts did not participate in the Jacobite risings, they were spared the brutal annihilation of the clan system in the Highlands. Even still, the clan system of Scotland was effectually crushed after the Battle of Culloden in 1746. The outlawing of bagpipes, tartans, and clan chiefs by the British government affected every clan – participatory in the Risings or not – in the Highlands, and thus it forced the county into a deep state of regression and new ways of living.

=== The modern clan ===
After the destruction of Toward and Ascog Castles in 1646, the chiefs of Clan Lamont lived at Ardlamont until the last of their lands were sold in 1893 by the 21st chief, John Henry Lamont of Lamont, who emigrated to Australia. The present chief of the clan is Father Peter Noel Lamont of that Ilk, Chief of the Name and Arms of Lamont, who is a parish priest in Marayong (a suburb of Sydney), Australia.

Chief Lamont has appointed James Burden RFD as his Clan Lieutenant, and the Much Hon Baron of Seabegs (Dr. George M. Burden, 31st Baron of Seabegs) and Mr. Scott Turner as his Chieftains (Ceann-Tighe) and High Commissioners respectively in Canada and the United States. Chief Lamont is a member of the Standing Council of Scottish Chiefs, represented by Dr. Burden from July 2018 to July 2023. In Aug 2023, Mr. Turner assumed the position of Chief Lamont's representative on the Standing Council of Scottish Chiefs.

==== Lamont-Campbell of Possil ====
The Lamont-Campbell of Possil armorial bearings

The Lamont-Campbells of Possil (see Carter-Campbell of Possil), were one of the few instances where the Lamonts turned the tables on the Campbells. The Campbells acquired much of the Lamont lands in Cowal by means fair and foul. One of the "fair" ways was for a Campbell to marry a Lamont heiress, and so inherit the estate. With the Lamont-Campbells, it is an instance of the reverse. In 1844, the 20th Chief, Archibald James Lamont, married Harriet Campbell of Possil after the death of his first wife. Their son, Celestine Norman Lamont, born in 1858, then inherited Possil, and became the first Lamont-Campbell of Possil. The addition of the Campbell name was a condition of the inheritance. The family, though, remained Lamonts – still subject to the chief of Clan Lamont. The estates are located north of Glasgow, separated from the traditional land in Cowal. Mrs. Margaret Lamont-Campbell was one of the founders of the Clan Lamont Society (Scotland), in 1895.

==== Clan Societies ====
The Clan Lamont Society (Scotland) was formed in 1895 in a hotel room in Glasgow, Scotland, with the purpose to keep alive the values and traditions of the clan. According to Hector McKechnie, in his seminal tome, "The Lamont Clan, 1235–1935." The principle founder was one Lieut-Colonel William Belfour Lamont, VD, JD of the McPhadrick sept of the Lamonts.

In 1906, a memorial was erected by the Clan Lamont Society at Dunoon. The memorial, which consists of a stone Celtic Cross, commemorates the many Lamonts who were killed in 1646. Every year the society lays a wreath at Dunoon to commemorate the site. The society also provides the Lamont Shield at the Cowal Highland Gathering, which is an award given to the best Juvenile (under 18) Solo piper at the games.

The Clan Lamont Society of North America and the Clan Lamont Society of Australia formed as independent organizations in 1982, to identify and serve the Lamont diaspora abroad, preserve clan traditions and culture, and promote the history of the clan. The Clan Lamont Society of Canada form in 1984, but officially closed in 2022.

== Clan profile ==
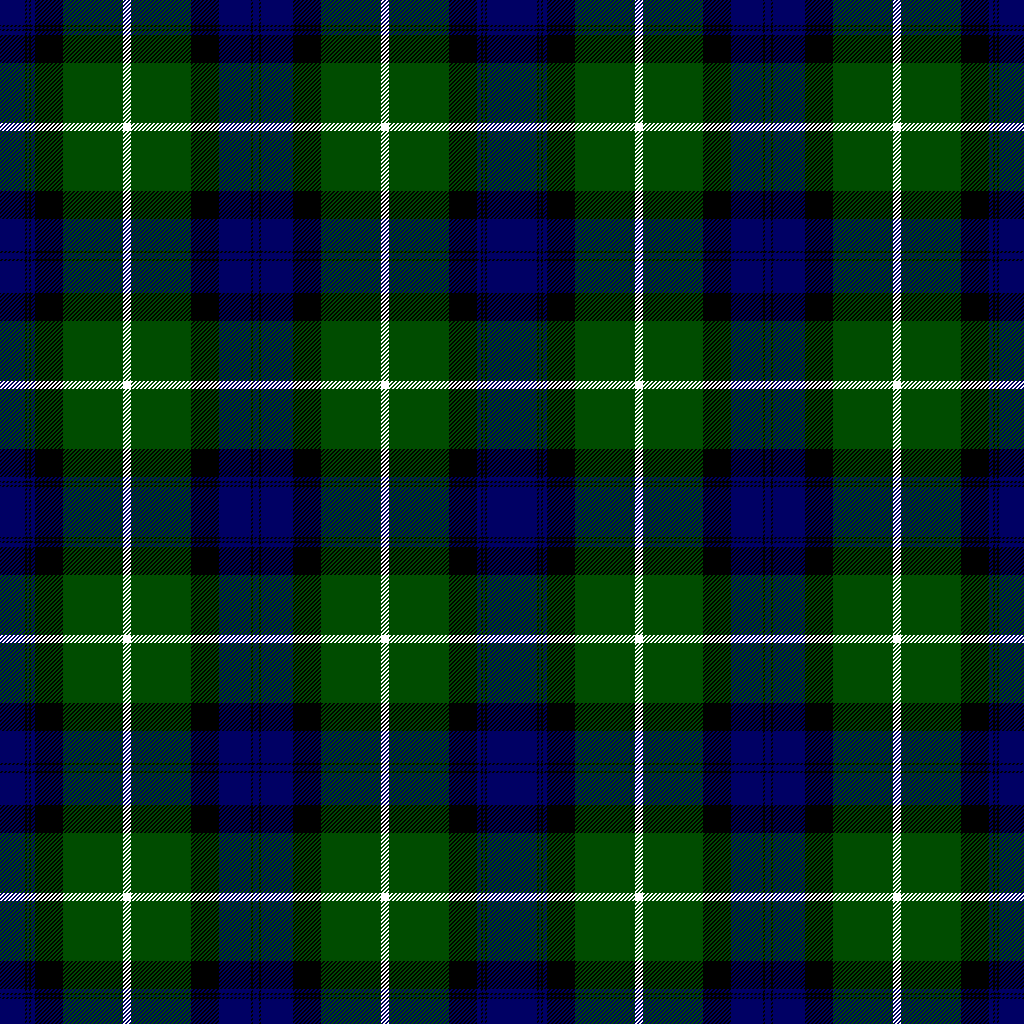
The "Clan Lawmond" tartan which appeared in the dubious Vestiarium Scoticum by the Sobieski Stuarts in 1845.

=== Chief ===
- Clan chief: The Rev. Fr. Peter Noel Lamont of that Ilk, Chief of the Name and Arms of Lamont.

=== Crest badge, clan badge and pibroch ===
- Crest badge: Note: The crest badge is made up of the chief's heraldic crest and motto,
  - Chief's crest: A hand couped at the wrist, all proper.
  - Chief's motto: Ne parcas nec spernas (translation from Latin: "Neither despise nor fear" or "Neither spare nor scorn").
- Clan badge: Note: there have been several clan badges attributed to the clan,
  - Crab Apple Tree.
  - Dryas (Latin: Octopetala) (Scottish Gaelic: Luidh Cheann).
- March: Captain MacLamont's March (Scottish Gaelic: Spaidsearachd Chaiptein Mhic Laomainn).
- Lament: The Wanderer's Lament (Scottish Gaelic: Cumha an Fhograich).
- Salute: A Hundred Welcomes to Thee, MacLamont (Scottish Gaelic: Mhic Laomainn ceud failte dhuit).

=== Tartan ===
Clan Lamont is closely associated with Clan Campbell, and the Lamont tartan reflects this. The Lamont tartan differs from the Campbell in only that the lines centred on green for the Campbell tartan are white on the Lamont. There is a sample of the Lamont tartan in the collection of the Highland Society of London which bears the seal and signature of the clan chief dating from around 1816.

=== Associated names ===
The following is a list of surnames associated with Clan Lamont. Note that many of these names are also associated with other clans.

- Aldownie, (and Aldowny)
- Albright
- Bearden
- Black
- Blackie
- Blaik
- Blaikie
- Blake
- Blaker
- Blakey
- Broun
- Brown
- Bordon
- Burden
- Burdon
- Burton
- Clement(s)
- Devers
- Green(e)
- Lamb
- Lamant
- Lambie
- Lam
- Lamm
- Lammie
- Lammon
- Lammond
- Lamon
- Lamond
- Lamondson
- Lamons
- Lamont
- Lamonte
- Lander(s)
- Layman
- Learmonth
- Leeman
- Leemans
- Leemon
- Lemmon(s)
- Lemon(s)
- Lemond
- Lemmond
- Limon
- Limond
- Limont
- Lhomond
- Lomond
- Lucas
- Luck
- Luckie, (and Lucky)
- Luke
- MacAldowie
- MacAlduie
- MacClammie, (and MacClammy)
- MacClement(s)
- MacCluckie, (and MacClucky)
- MacClymont
- MacEaracher
- MacErcher
- MacErracher
- MacFarquhar
- MacGilledow
- MacGillegowie
- MacGorie, (and MacGory)
- MacGorrie
- Mackquein (Aliased as Lamont)
- MacIldowie
- MacIlwham (and Wham)
- MacIlwhom
- MacInturner
- MacKerchar
- MacKerracher
- MacLammie, (and MacLammy)
- MacLamond
- McLellan
- McLeman
- MacLemmon
- MacLemon
- McClemont
- McClymont
- McLymont
- McCliment
- MacLimans
- MacLucas
- MacLuckie, (and MacLucky)
- MacLugash
- MacLuke
- MacLusa
- MacLymont
- MacMunn
- MacPatrick
- MacPhunn
- MacSorley
- MacSurely
- McClymonds
- McLimans
- McLaomainn
- Mecklem
- Meickleam
- Meickleham
- Meikle
- Meikleham, (and Meiklehem)
- Meiklejohn
- Meiklem, (and Maiklem)
- Munn
- Munt
- Paters(s)on
- Patrick
- Phorich
- Sitlington
- Sorlie, (and Sorly)
- Toward
- Towart
- Turner
- White
- Whyte
- Young

Note: the source for all associated names is the Clan Lamont Society of North America website.

== See also ==
- Scottish Clan
- Scottish Highlands
- Clan Campbell
- Dunoon
- Argyll & Bute
- Clan MacDougall

== Bibliography ==
- Anderson, William. The Scottish Nation; Or The Surnames, Families, Literature, Honours, And Biographical History Of The People Of Scotland. Volume 2. Edinburgh: A. Fullarton & Co., 1862.
- Eyre-Todd, George. The Highland Clans of Scotland: Their History and Traditions. Charleston, South Carolina, USA: Garnier & Company, 1969.
- Levene, Mark & Roberts, Penny. The Massacre in History, Berghahn Books, 1999. ISBN 1-57181-934-7.
- MacKinnon, Charles. Scottish Highlanders. Barnes & Noble Publishing, 1995. ISBN 0-88029-950-9.
- Manganiello, Stephen C. The Concise Encyclopedia of the Revolutions and Wars of England, Scotland, and Ireland, 1639–1660, Scarecrow Press, 2004. ISBN 0-8108-5100-8.
- McKechnie, Hector. The Lamont Clan 1235–1935. Seven Centuries of Clan History from Record Evidence. Edinburgh: Clan Lamont Society, 1938.
- Moncreiffe of that Ilk, Iain. The Highland Clans. London: Barrie & Rockliff, 1967.
- Roberts, John L. Clan, King and Covenant: History of the Highland Clans from the Civil War to the Glencoe Massacre, Edinburgh University Press, 2000. ISBN 0-7486-1393-5.
- Smibert, Thomas. The Clans of the Highlands of Scotland. Edinburgh: James Hogg. 1850.
