= Macharioch Motte =

Coordinates: 55.3261°N 5.5845°W

Macharioch Motte is the remains of a motte-and-bailey castle situated in a field near the farm of Macharioch in Kintyre, Argyll and Bute, Scotland.

== See also ==
- List of castles in Argyll and Bute
