= Of that Ilk =

Term used by Scottish clan chieftains

"Of that Ilk", otherwise known as "Chief of that Bluid", is a term used in the Scottish nobility to denote a clan chieftain in some Scottish clans. The term of that ilk means "of the same [name]", and is used to avoid repetition in a person's title.

Historically, it was customary in the Scottish feudal system for the laird of a manor to include the name of his fief in his title; Thus, in Robert Louis Stevenson's novel Kidnapped, the protagonist—after discovering he was the new laird of his (impoverished) manor—later introduced himself as "David Balfour, of Shaws". However, in a number of cases, the clan name was derived from the name of the fief, creating a repetition (such as, "Lord Anstruther of Anstruther", or even "Lachlan Maclachlan of Maclachlan"); for convenience, this was eliminated with the term of that Ilk (therefore, "Anstruther of that Ilk", or "MacLachlan of that Ilk").

Where a large clan of this type has one or more cadet branches, the leaders of those branches would have an estate name distinct from the clan name, leaving the term "of that Ilk" to denote the overall clan chieftain. Thus Mackenzie, in his Observ. Laws & Customs of Nations, refers to a decision of James VI "betwixt Blair of that ilk, and Blair of Balthaiock", two lairds of the now-defunct Clan Blair.

== Clans ==
The following clans include the term "of that ilk" in the title of their clan chiefs

- Clan Blackadder
- Clan Blair
- Clan Buchanan
- Clan Cockburn
- Clan Kilgour
- Clan Cranstoun
- Clan Dewar
- Clan Drummond
- Clan Forsyth
- Clan Hannay
- Clan Home
- Clan Innes
- Clan Kinninmont
- Clan Lamont
- Clan MacArthur
- Clan MacLachlan
- Clan Moffat
- Clan Moncreiffe
- Clan Nesbitt
- Clan Oliphant
- Clan Pollock
- Clan Pringle
- Clan Ralston
- Clan Rutherford
- Clan Sinclair
- Clan Swinton
- Clan Wallace
- Clan Wemyss

== See also ==
- von und zu
