= John Maxwell Geddes =

Scottish composer and academic

John Maxwell Geddes (26 May 1941 – 7 September 2017) was a Scottish composer and academic. He taught in Scotland and in institutions in Europe and America; compositions include three symphonies.

== Life ==
Geddes was born in Maryhill, Glasgow in 1941; his father, Jack, was a fireman stationed in Belgium during the war and was a joiner to trade. He was educated locally, and played oboe and saxophone, playing in the Glasgow Schools Orchestra. He studied at the Royal Scottish Academy of Music, where he won the Academy's prize in composition. A scholarship enabled him to study with Niels Viggo Bentzon at the Royal Danish Conservatoire in Copenhagen.

He taught at schools in Glasgow, and from 1986 he worked at the Academy. He lectured at many American universities and European academies, and was composer-in-residence in Hamburg, Berlin and Bremen. He was associated with the BBC Scottish Symphony Orchestra for more than 50 years.

Geddes was a strong supporter of musical education. His work Postlude for Strings was a protest against Argyll and Bute Council's closure in 2009 of Castle Toward, where he was composer-in-residence; the building was used by youth orchestras including Glasgow Schools Symphony Orchestra, which Geddes conducted. In Postlude for Strings, the players in the orchestra leave the stage one by one (as in Haydn's Farewell Symphony).

Awards included the PRS Composer in Education Award in 1991, Fellow of the Royal Scottish Academy of Music in 2002, and in 2007 the Creative Scotland Award.

He married in 1964 Lily Blain; they had a daughter and two sons.

Geddes died on 7 September 2017 after a short illness. The Scottish composer William Sweeney said "... there was a real intellectual drive to the music. His style was an encounter between post-war modernism and Scottish traditions... there was always a web of vivid allusion, formal dexterity and a sense of humour that could break through the dark clouds of serious symphonic thought."

On 25 June 2018 Geddes received a posthumous honorary doctorate from the University of Glasgow.

== Compositions ==
Works include three symphonies and other orchestral music, chambers works, arrangements of folk songs, transcriptions of Renaissance music, and film music.
