= Clan Ralston =

Scottish clan

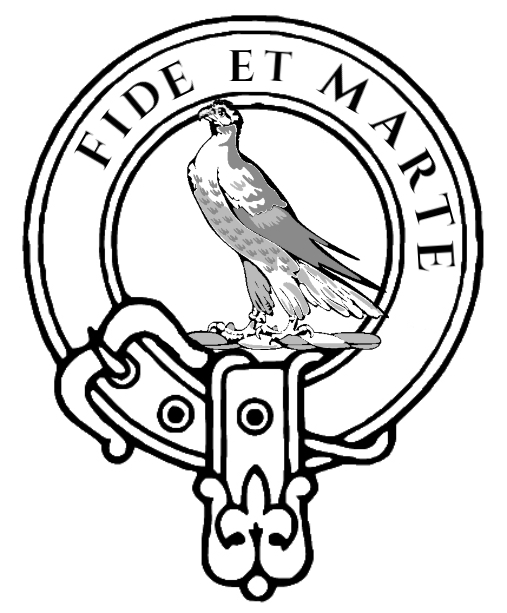
- Motto: Fide Et Marte (With fidelity and bravery)

Profile
- Region: Scottish Lowlands
- District: Renfrewshire
- Clan Ralston no longer has a chief, and is an armigerous clan
- Historic seat: Ralston, Paisley, Renfrewshire Woodside-Ralston, Beith, Ayrshire
- Last Chief: Gavin Ralston of that Ilk
- Died: June 1819
Clan branches
Ralston of Ralston (historic chiefs)
Ralston of Warwick Hill
Allied clans
Clan Campbell, Clan Douglas

Clan Ralston is a Scottish clan. The clan is recognized as such by the Court of the Lord Lyon, but as it does not currently have a chief recognized by the Lord Lyon King of Arms it is considered an Armigerous clan.

== History ==
=== Origins of the Clan ===
The surname is derived from the historic lands of Ralston located just east of Paisley, Renfrewshire. The name is a condensed version of "Ralph's Town", which over time softened into the spelling of today. The personal name Ralph is a diminutive of Randolph, which itself comes from the old English Raedwlf, meaning "cunning wolf". Like most Scottish surnames, the spelling has varied greatly over time, with variants such as Roulston, Ralfestoune, Railstoune, Raltoune, Rolston, and Ralstone.

According to one family legend commonly referenced by genealogists and historians, the progenitor of the Ralston Surname began with a Ralph, younger son of one of the Earls of Fife. This Ralph received land from the high steward and named them after himself, his descendants adopting the same. However, because of the lack of evidence, this story is highly debated. Modern researchers have suggested that the actual man in question was Ralph the Chaplain of Paisley, who owned the adjacent lands of Hillington during the late 12th Century. Due to the lack of contemporary records, the first Ralph of Ralston may never be officially determined.

Another common origin legend is that the name is derived from an ancient family line who gained notoriety in battle for defeating their enemies by rolling heavy rocks down hillsides, leading to the name "Rollingstone", eventually changing to Ralston.

The earliest mention of this family is Jacobus de Rauliston, dominis ejusden, who appears as witness to "de creatine abbotis" of Paisley in 1219. Nicolaius de Raulston witnessed a charter granted by Sir Anthony Lombard for the lands of Fulton to the monks of Paisley Abbey in 1272. In 1296 Hew de Ralstoun and his brother Thomas de Raulfefton, Counte de Lanark signed the Ragman Roll of 1296 swearing allegiance to Edward I of England. In 1346 Jacobus de Raulyston of that Ilk witnessed the election of an Abbot of Paisley. This is the first time a member of the family is found with the honorable title Of that Ilk.

=== The Stewarts of Ralston ===
It is unclear as to the lineage of the chiefs between 1346 and 1426. James Paterson in his History of the Counties of Ayr and Wigton suggests that the family line either died out and a new family stepped in to assume the name, or the name was adopted from an heiress of Ralston. Paterson further suggests that the Stewarts were responsible for the continuation.

At this time an area in Cunninghame near Kilmarnock, Ayrshire began being called "Railstoun". It was owned by Sir John Stewart of Ralston, and was passed by him to his son Walter. There are no records of Walter having any children, however he is often credited as being the father of John de Ralston, and possibly others. If he followed the traditional Scottish naming convention, then this would be plausible, as would also explain the high status of John de Ralston.

In 1416 Walter Stewart resigned his lands of Ralston in Ayrshire to Robert Stewart, Duke of Albany, and in 1430 they were under the ownership of Christina de Douglas, who at the instance of Sir Henry Douglas of Lochleven, resigned them to James de Douglas, son of the deceased Sir William Douglas of Lochleven. From this point on, the Ayrshire lands of Ralston are seldom mentioned, passing between the Boyds and Stewarts.

=== 15th & 16th Century ===
In 1426 John de Ralston is recorded as chaplain and secretary for Archibald Douglas, 5th Earl of Douglas. In 1442 he was a member of the court of King James II of Scotland, and by 1447 was elected Bishop of Dunkeld, later becoming the king's treasurer and keeper of the Privy Seal. He was succeeded as Lord of Ralston by his nephew John Ralston of that Ilk.

In 1505/6, after legal difficulty from an unfulfilled duty of protecting the interests of the Archbishop of Glasgow and its subsequent trial, John Ralston of that Ilk passed the lands of Ralston near Paisley to his eldest son and heir Thomas Ralston of Rossholme (sometimes spelled Roilsholme) in Cunninghame. Thomas then exchanged the original Ralston land for the lands of Rossholme and Dunlop Hill where he was living, reserving 1/3 of Ralston land in liferent to his parents. Some of the Ralston family remained in Renfrewshire while others moved to Ayrshire with him. Thomas fell at The Battle of Flodden and was succeeded as chief by his son, also named Thomas.

Thomas had no children and was succeeded by his brother Hew, who fell at the Battle of Pinkie Cleugh. Hew's son and heir, also named Hew, acquired the lands of Woodside and Turnerland in the parish of Beith in 1551, and upon doing so had a tower house constructed, renaming the site “Woodside-Ralston”. This home would become the seat of the clan until the 19th century. Hew would be succeeded as heir by his grandson William.

=== 17th Century ===
William Ralston, second son of Hew Ralston of that Ilk, was the progenitor of the Ralstons of Auchentorlie who flourished from the 16th through the 18th century and expanded in the areas surrounding the original clan seat, including Paisley, Glasgow, and Hamilton. This line would go on as cadet branches of the clan as the Ralstons of Auchangramont, Tower Hill, and Warwick Hill.

In 1610 John Ralston, the third son of Hew Ralston of that Ilk, was the recipient of 1000 acres of land in Kilcloghan, Cavan, Northern Ireland as part of the Plantation of Ulster. Though records suggest that the plantation was unsuccessful, many residents of the area today still carry the Ralston surname.

In 1643 William Ralston of that Ilk, grandson and heir of Hew Ralston of that Ilk, expanded the Ralston estate by the acquisition of the lands of Auchingoun in the parish of Lochwinnoch and the lands of Roughbank and Crummock. William was an educated royalist, a leader of the Remonstrants, and a rigid Covenanter. He fought alongside Archibald Campbell, 1st Marquess of Argyll and commanded troops in battle.

In 1650, in return for his loyalty and due to his status as a successful Lowland Laird, William was granted lands in Kintyre, near Campbeltown, and charged with restoring Saddell Castle. While completing the task, he moved a portion of his family to these new lands as part of the Kintyre Lowland Plantation.

William was arrested in 1665 and imprisoned at Dumbarton Castle due to his military involvement during the Wars of the Three Kingdoms. He was released in 1667 and returned to Kintyre. When his tack for Sadell elapsed, he was granted new lands in both Campbeltown and Southend. He spent the rest of his life as a church elder and was buried in Kiel, Southend.

William is the first to be recorded as having armorial bearings, being registered in 1672 with the Court of the Lord Lyon. They are described as:

“Argent, on a bend, azure: three acorns in the seed. Crest, a falcon proper. Supporters, dexter, a man in armour, sinister, a horse rampant. Motto, Fide et Marte.”

It is because of these arms that many researchers point out a family connection with Muirhead. William's mother Barbara Hamilton of Udston was the daughter of Margaret Muirhead, who herself was the daughter of Sir James Muirhead 7th of Lauchope. It is possible that William matriculated his shield from James, as he was the closest relation to possess armorial bearings.

=== 18th Century to the Present ===
Gavin Ralston of that Ilk succeeded his grandfather as heir to the chieftain title. In 1703 he was called out before his church on the account of unseasonable drinking and swearing. The following year, due to excessive debts, Gavin sold the ancient family lands of Ralston near Paisley to John, Earl of Dundonald, with the exception that he could keep his title Of that Ilk. Gavin's son and heir William followed in his unsavory lifestyle, and in 1744 while in a bout of drunkenness sustained a head injury from his wife via a brass ladle, leading to his death a few days later. His son Gavin succeeded him at age 9.

The last Gavin Ralston of that Ilk spent his younger years living in Virginia working with his merchant cousin William Sheddon. Upon returning to Scotland he married Anabella Pollock, and remodeled the family seat at Woodside. He joined the army and served in Ireland. In 1771, in order to pay off remaining debts from his father, Gavin sold the property of Woodside-Ralston. In 1780 Gavin inherited the lands of Arthurlie from his father-in-law, and established himself as a well respected businessman in the textile industry. He died in June 1819 at the age of 85 without any still-living heirs, and was buried in Beith with Masonic honors. He was the last surviving representative of the Ralstons of that Ilk

== Tartans ==
Clan specific tartans were not common until 1815 when The Highland Society of London began registering Clan Chief recognized colors. Prior to this, most tartans were worn based on districts encompassing grouped towns and families, and generally the colors were determined based on available dyes and threads of the area. In 2008 through an act of the Scottish Parliament, The Scottish Register of Tartans was established to promote and preserve information on each claimed tartan. It consists of all formerly registered tartans from STS, STA, and STWR in conjunction with The National Records of Scotland.

There is no chiefly recognized tartan for Clan Ralston, however there are several that are registered and associated with the family.

•Paisley District

Designed by Alan C Drennan. Registered in 1952.

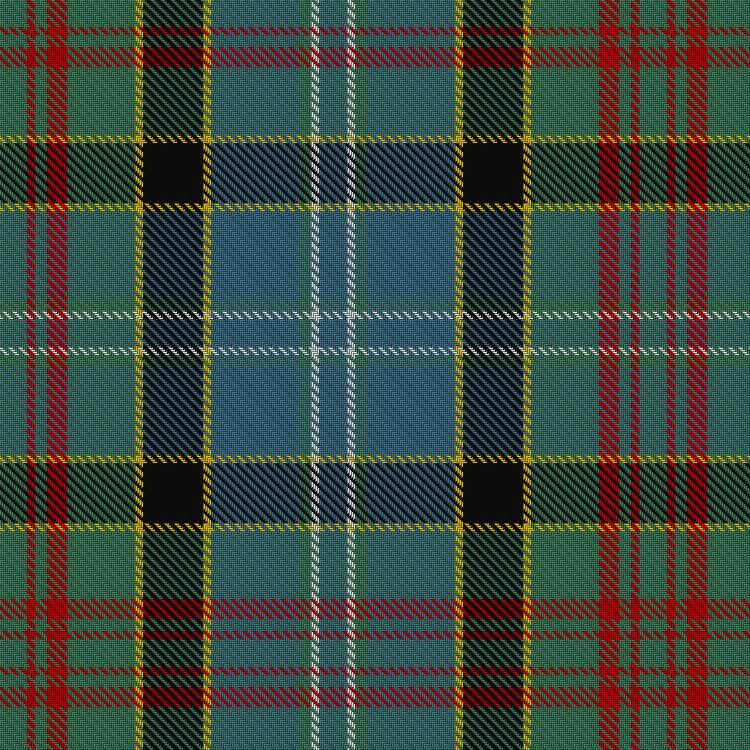
Paisley District Tartan

•Ralston (UK)

Designed by Robin Elliot and Alison Ralston. Registered in 2006.

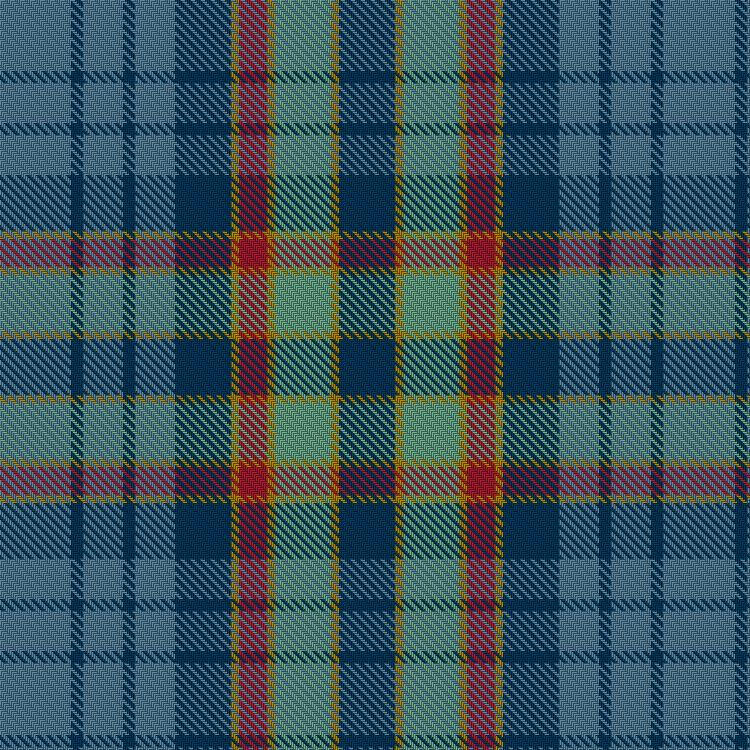
Ralston (UK) Tartan

•Ralston (USA)

Designed by Michael T Ralstin. Registered in 2003.

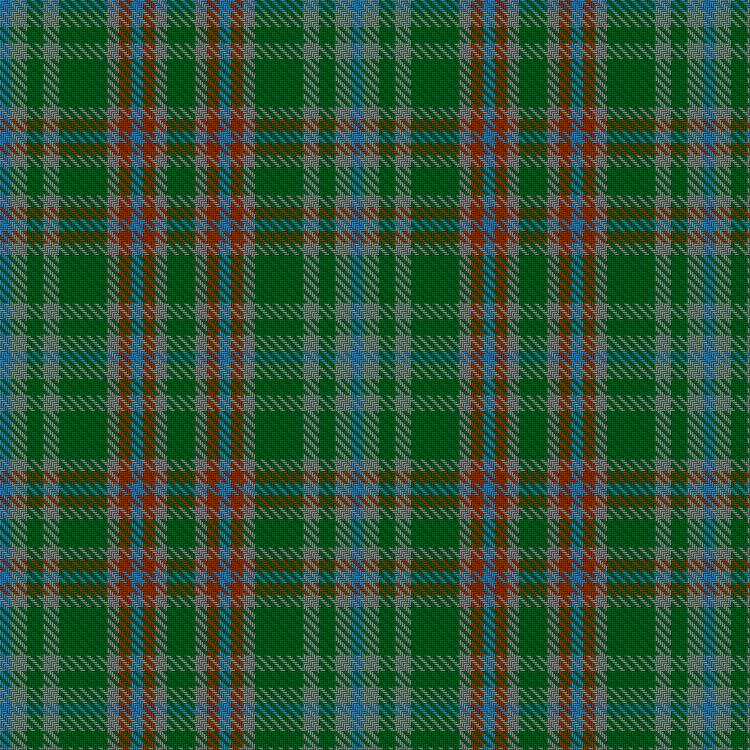
Ralston (USA) Tartan

•Ralston (Universal)

Supported by Scotclans.com. Designer and dates unlisted.

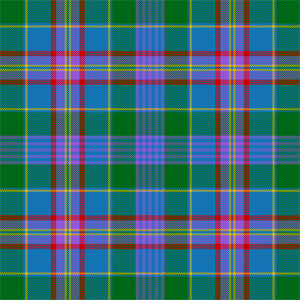
Ralston (Universal) Tartan

== List of the Chiefs of Ralston ==
The succession of the chiefs vary from source to source, however a common line is generally accepted starting with John de Ralston. According to George Robertson, in his book "Topographical Description of Ayrshire; More Particularly of Cunninghame: Together with a Genealogical Account of the Principal Families in that Bailiwick” the line is as follows:

- Ralph, of Paisely and Ralston
- Jacobus de Raulyston, dominus ejusdem
- Nicholaius de Rauilston
- Thomas de Ralfestone, Counte de Lanark
- Jacobus de Rauliston, of that Ilk
- (unknown, possibly Sir John Stewart of Ralston)
- (unknown, possibly Walter Stewart of Ralston)
- John de Ralston, Bishop of Dunkeld and keeper of the Privy Seal. Succeeded by his nephew:
- John Ralston of that Ilk. Married to Hawes Wallace
- Thomas Ralston of that Ilk, fell at the battle of Flodden
- Thomas Ralston of that Ilk. Succeeded by his brother:
- Hew Ralston of that Ilk, fell at the battle of Pinkie Cleugh. Married to Janet Whiteford
- Hew Ralston of that Ilk. Married to Janet Hamilton of Torrance. Succeeded by his grandson:
- William Ralston of that Ilk. Married first to Ursula Mure of Glanderstoun, secondly to Jean Dunlop of Dunlop. Succeeded by his grandson:
- Gavin Ralston of that Ilk. Married to Anna Porterfield of Porterfield
- William Ralston of that Ilk. Married to Marion Ewing of Cadder
- Gavin Ralston of that Ilk. Married to Annabella Pollock of Aurthurlie.

The chieftain line ended with Gavin Ralston, as none of his sons outlived him.

== Castles ==
- Ralston, which was two miles north of Paisley, was held by the Ralstons from the 13th century. In 1704 the property passed to the Earl of Dundonald, then to the Hamiltons and then to the Orrs. There was a castle but it was replaced with Ralston House in 1810. However, the house was demolished in 1934.
- Woodside House, which is a mile north-east of Beith in Ayrshire incorporates an old tower house from 1551, which has been altered and extended down the centuries. It was held by the Ralstons from 1551 to 1772 but later passed to the Patrick family.
- Saddell Castle in Kintyre, was built by the Bishop of Argyll in 1507. While Clan Campbell had control, the Ralstons were the tenants and they remodeled the castle in the 1650s. The castle was superseded at the end of the 18th century by Saddell House, but the castle has been restored and can be rented as holiday accommodation.
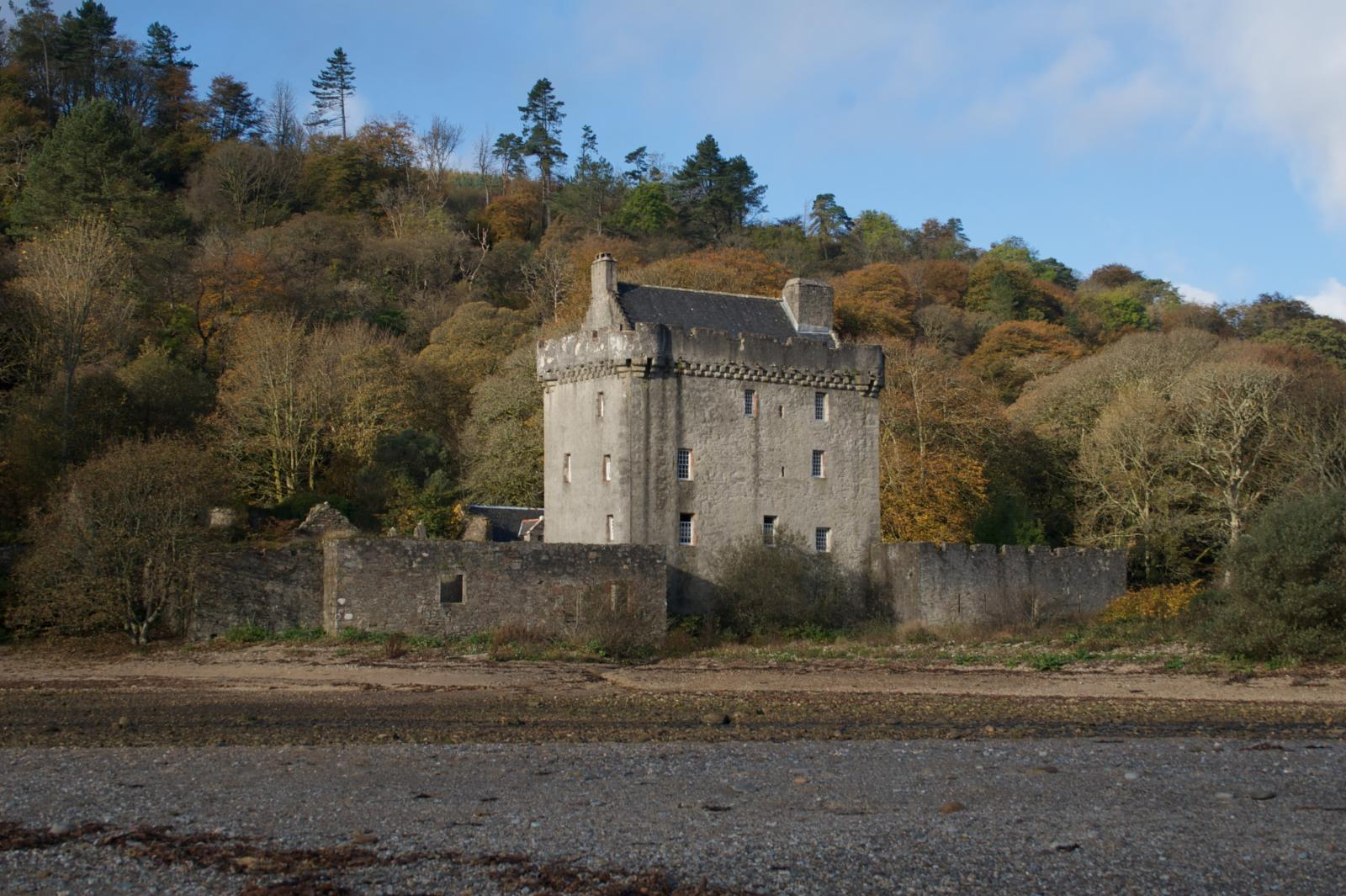
  Saddell Castle

== See also ==
- Scottish clan
- Armigerous clan
- Kilmaurs Place
- The Lands of Roughwood
- Ralston, Renfrewshire
- Ralston (surname)
