= Clan Blair =

Scottish clan

- Blar (meaning field or plain)
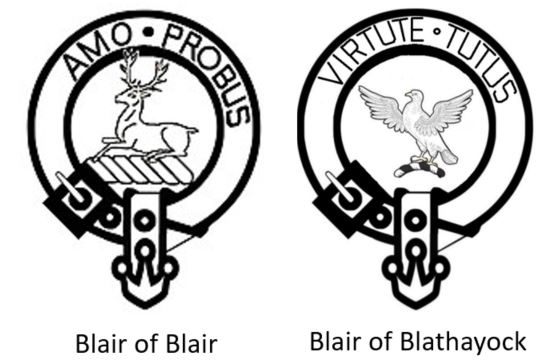
- Crest: For Blair of Blair: a stag lodged, proper For Blair of Balthayock: a dove, wings apart
- Motto: Amo Probos (Love the virtuous); Virtute tutus (Protected by virtue)

Profile
- District: Ayrshire and Blairgowrie
- Animal: Stag and dove
- Clan Blair no longer has a chief, and is an armigerous clan
- Seat: Ayrshire and Blairgowrie
Allied clans
Clan Wallace; Clan Bruce

Clan Blair is a Lowland Scottish clan.

== History ==
=== Origins ===
Blair as a place name is found in over two hundred localities throughout Scotland. Blair as a surname in Scotland is first recorded in the early 1200s with two main families – Blair of Blair (also known as Blair of that Ilk) from Ayrshire, and Blair of Balthayock from Perthshire, with no known evidence of a common ancestor.

=== The Blairs of Blair ===
The records of the monastery of Kilwinning apparently show that the Barony of Blair was conferred upon a Norman, Jean Francois, by King William I of Scots (1165–1214). It is generally accepted that John Francis de Blair's grandson, William de Blair, married one of the daughters of King John of England.

Alexander de Blare was mentioned as witnessing an agreement between the burgh of Irvine and Brice de Eglunstone in 1205. Alexander was probably of the Barony of Blair in Ayrshire, granted by King William "the Lion".

William de Blare was knighted by King Alexander II and was made Steward of Fife in 1235.

Sir Bryce de Blare was knighted by King Alexander III. He eventually supported William Wallace and was executed by the English at the Barns of Ayr Massacre in 1296. His nephew, Roger de Blare, was knighted by Robert the Bruce after the Battle of Bannockburn in 1314.

=== The Blairs of Balthayock ===
This Blair family can trace its ancestry back to Stephen de Blair, who held lands in the Parish of Blair in Gowrie, now named Blairgowrie. He also witnessed a charter on the lands of Balgillo, Angus, by Dovenald the Abbot of Brechin to the monastery at Arbroath between 1204 and 1211.

These Blairs have several cadet branches:

- of Ardblair,
- of Bendochy,
- of Balgillo,
- of Balmyle,
- of Pittendreich and Lethendy,
- of Glasclune,
- of Denhead,
- of Over Durdie,
- of Melginch,
- of Balgray,
- of Friarton,
- of Gairdrum,
- of Ballathie,
- Blair burgesses of Dundee, and
- the Blair family in France.

=== Chieftainship ===
These two families long contested to be recognised for chieftainship of the entire Blair clan until King James VI affirmed in 1658 that "The eldest male of either of the two Families would have precedency over the younger to the Chieftainship". The significance of this suggests that members of these two family groups had frequent interchange with each other and recognized some form of kinship, whether secular or by blood ties.

== Places of interest ==
The following properties are associated with both Blair families:

- Ardblair Castle, Blairgowrie, Perthshire.
- Balthayock Castle, near Perth.
- Blair Castle, Dalry, Ayrshire. Above the drawbridge, carved on a stone arch, is the stag of the Blair crest.
- Blairquhan, Straiton, Maybole, Ayrshire.
- Carberry Tower, near Musselburgh, East Lothian.
- Cathcart Castle, Rutherglen, Lanarkshire.
- Cowden Hall, near Neilston, Renfrewshire.
- Dunimarle Castle, Culross, Fife.
- Glasclune Castle, near Blairgowrie, Perthshire.
- Nether Auchendrane, or Blairstoun, near Ayrshire.
- Rossie Ochil House, Forgandenny, Perthshire.
- Rusco Castle, or Rusko Castle, Gatehouse of Fleet, Castle Douglas, Kirkcudbrightshire.
