= Asgog Castle =

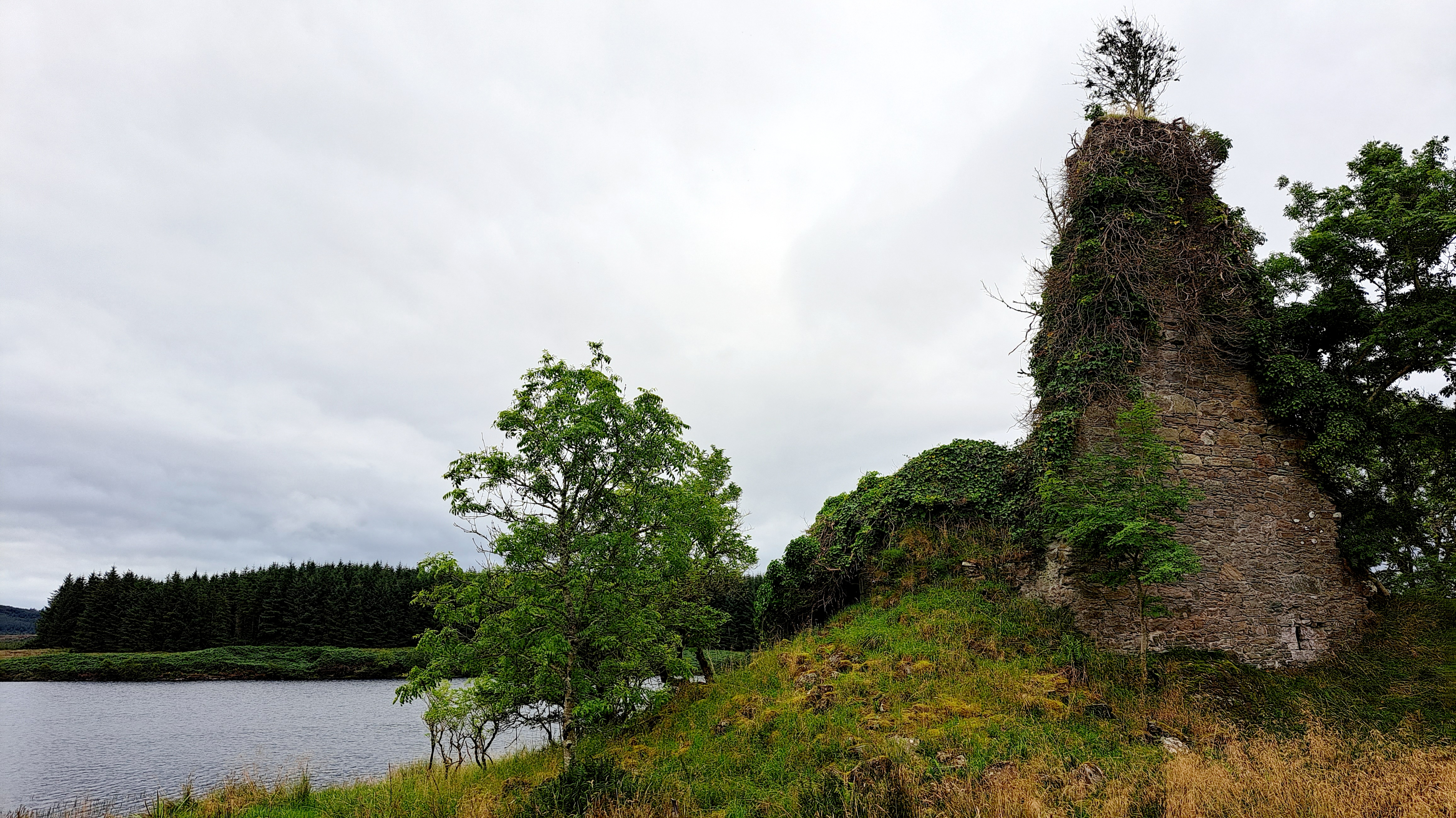
- The ruins in 2022
- Interactive map of the Asgog Castle area

General information
- Status: Ruin
- Location: Argyll and Bute, Scotland, Asgog Loch, Millhouse, Scotland, United Kingdom
- Coordinates: 55.884015°N 5.284626°W, National grid reference NR 94666 70530

Listed Building – Category B
- Official name: Castle Ascog
- Designated: 20 July 1971
- Reference no.: LB12082

Asgog Castle is situated on the north-western shore of Loch Asgog, on the Cowal Peninsula, in Argyll and Bute, western Scotland. It has been designated a Category B listed building since 20 July 1971.

== History ==
The castle was once the residence of a cadet branch of Clan Lamont. It was first recorded in 1581, although its origins may date back to the mid-15th century. In 1646, the castle was besieged and ultimately destroyed by Clan Campbell, during the event now known as the Massacre of Dunoon.

The Cowal Peninsula had been under the Lamont family’s control since the reign of David II, with Ardlamont and Ascog recorded as their lands between the 15th and 16th centuries. The first documentary reference to a castle at Ascog dates from 1581. In 1646, during the Civil Wars, the castle was attacked and destroyed by Campbell forces and was not rebuilt, although the estate returned to the Lamonts following the Restoration of Charles II.

The surviving tower is rectangular, featuring a vaulted ground floor, two mural chambers, two upper storeys, and a latrine in the north-west angle, with mural staircases connecting the floors. Although older accounts indicate the existence of courtyard walls and a round tower, no visible traces remain. Architecturally, the tower bears similarities to Kilchurn Castle, which dates from the 15th century. Access is presently via a footpath that skirts the nearby gardens.

Today, only three walls of the tower remain standing; there are no identifiable remains of the courtyard.
