= Asgog Loch =

Lake in Argyll and Bute, Scotland

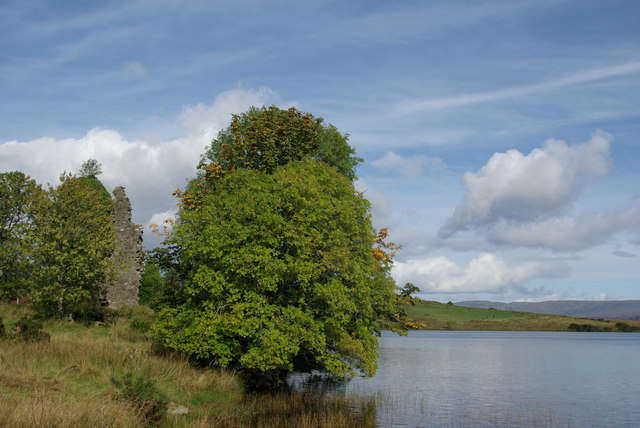
- Asgog Castle and Loch.

- Location within Argyll and Bute
- Location: Argyll and Bute, Scotland.
- Coordinates: 55.884162°N 5.2824952°W, grid reference NR94807054
- Type: Freshwater Loch and Reservoir.
- Basin countries: Scotland, United Kingdom.
- Max. length: 2,285 feet (696 m)
- Max. width: 1,235 feet (376 m)
- Surface area: 250,000 m^{2} (2,700,000 sq ft)
- Water volume: 450,000 m^{3} (360 acre⋅ft)

Asgog Loch is a natural freshwater loch in Argyll and Bute, Scotland. It is located about 4 kilometres (2.5 mi) southwest of Tighnabruaich, on the Cowal peninsula. The loch was dammed during the 19th century to create an impounding reservoir for the supply of freshwater to the Low Mills of the nearby gunpowder mills at Millhouse (the Kames Powder Works).

The remains of three crannogs, or artificial islands, have been observed within the loch on occasions when the water level has been lowered. Asgog Castle stands on the northwest shore of the loch.

== See also ==
- List of lochs in Scotland
- List of reservoirs and dams in the United Kingdom
