= Castle Toward =

Country house in Scotland

- Caisteal an Toll Àird
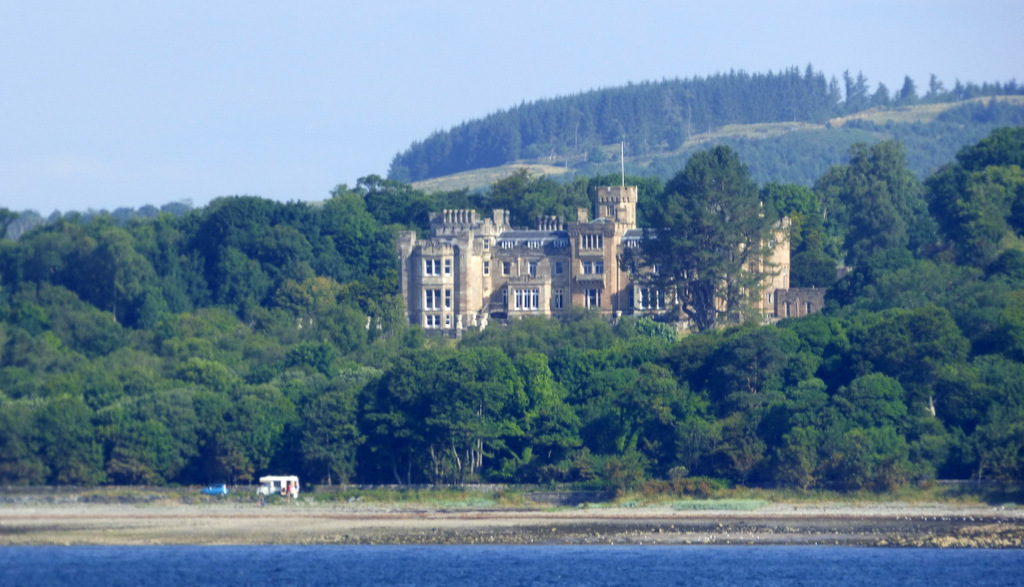
- The castle in 2018

- Location within Argyll and Bute

General information
- Status: Private
- Type: Country House
- Architectural style: Gothic Revival
- Location: Toward, Argyll and Bute, Scotland, Scotland
- Coordinates: 55.869554°N 5.0140108°W
- Construction started: 1820
- Client: Kirkman Finlay
- Owner: Denice Purdie, Keith Punler; Argyll and Bute Council; Glasgow Corporation; Kirkman Finlay; Clan Lamont

Technical details
- Material: Stone

Design and construction
- Architect: David Hamilton

Listed Building – Category B
- Official name: Castle Toward
- Designated: 19 July 1971
- Reference no.: LB5068

Inventory of Gardens and Designed Landscapes in Scotland
- Official name: Castle Toward
- Designated: 30 March 2007
- Reference no.: GDL00097

Castle Toward (Scottish Gaelic: Caisteal an Toll Àird) is a nineteenth-century country house in Argyll and Bute, Scotland.

Built in 1820, by Glasgow merchant Kirkman Finlay, it replaced the late medieval Toward Castle, formerly the ancestral home of the Clan Lamont. It was greatly extended in the early 20th century, and in the Second World War it served as HMS Brontosaurus. After the war it was sold to Glasgow Corporation and was used as an outdoor education facility until its closure in 2014. After a failed community buyout, Toward Castle and the estate were sold by Argyll and Bute Council to private owners in 2016. Castle Toward is a scheduled monument (LB5068).

== History ==
=== Toward Castle ===
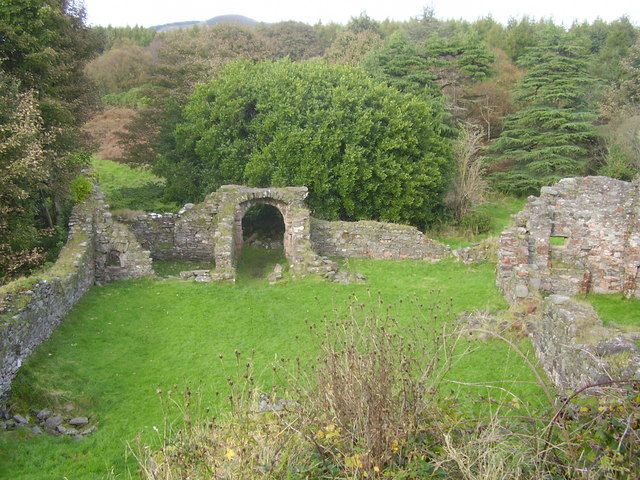
Ruins of Toward Castle

The original Toward Castle dates from the 15th century and was owned by the Clan Lamont until 1809. The castle was extended in the 17th century, but was abandoned after an attack by the Clan Campbell in 1646. The ruins lie around 500 metres (1,600 ft) south-east of the later Castle Toward. Toward Castle is a scheduled monument (SM300).

=== Castle Toward ===
The present Castle Toward was built in 1820 for Kirkman Finlay (1773–1842), former Lord Provost of Glasgow, as his family's country house. Finlay purchased the Achavoulin estate and renamed it Toward in 1818. It is built in the castellated Gothic Revival style, and was designed by David Hamilton. Edward La Trobe Bateman was involved in garden design work here in the 1880s.

It was from Castle Toward that the second son of Alexander Struthers Finlay – Alexander Kirkman Finlay – emigrated to the then colony of Victoria, Australia, and subsequently married the daughter of the then Governor of New South Wales, Hercules Robinson, 1st Baron Rosmead. The wedding of Nora Robinson and Alexander Kirkman Finlay at St James' Church, Sydney, in 1878 attracted enormous attention in the colony and was extensively reported in the press.

Later owned and extended by Major Andrew Coats, of the Coats family of Paisley, Italian plasterwork was installed in the public rooms in 1920. The entire building was restored and enlarged over the course of the 1920s by the architect Francis William Deas, who also laid out most of the current landscaping. The grounds incorporate the ruins of the original Toward Castle, the Chinese ponds, wooded areas, access to the shore, and views over the Firth of Clyde.

=== HMS Brontosaurus ===
During the Second World War the castle was requisitioned as a combined operations centre (COC No. 2), and was commissioned as HMS Brontosaurus in 1942. It was a training centre for the amphibious landings that were launched on D-Day, as well as for other raids. Officers and men trained on nearby beaches to use various landing craft. Both Winston Churchill and Lord Mountbatten during this time visited Brontosaurus. It closed in 1946.

=== Outdoor education centre ===
The castle, and 226 acres (0.91 km^{2}) of woodland, were purchased by the Corporation of Glasgow in 1948. The building was used initially as a residential school for children recovering from illness or living in deprived home conditions. It then became available for residential education for children from all Glasgow Primary Schools and operated for 50 years as an outdoor education centre for children from Glasgow, Renfrewshire and further afield. With the reorganisation of local government in Scotland in 1996, ownership passed to Argyll and Bute Council and such centres were threatened with closure. Peter Wilson, at the time the principal of the centre, formed a company called Actual Reality to operate the centre, as well as a second council-owned centre at Ardentinny. Activities operated by Actual Reality included high ropes, kayaking, and orienteering, as well as gorge walks and hill walks. The grounds of the centre were used as a filming location for the children's BBC Television series Raven, featuring the actor James Mackenzie, up to and including the seventh series at the start of 2008. The house was also used for residential courses for young people in music and art. The Glasgow Schools' Symphony Orchestra and West of Scotland Schools' Concert Band visited regularly. The house has been a category B listed building since 1971, and the grounds were added to the national Inventory of Gardens and Designed Landscapes in Scotland in 2007.

== Sale ==
On 13 November 2009, Argyll and Bute Council temporarily closed the castle on the recommendation of Strathclyde Fire and Rescue, on the grounds that it was unfit for purpose. There followed several attempts by the council to sell the estate, though all met with local opposition. The castle's former composer-in-residence, John Maxwell Geddes, wrote a Postlude for Strings in protest at plans to sell the castle. The Council placed the building on the market in 2010, and in response the South Cowal Community Development Company (SCCDC) was formed to explore community ownership of the castle, though their initial bid was rejected by the Scottish Ministers in 2011. An agreement was reached with a holiday company, which then pulled out of the sale in 2013 forcing the council to market the property once more. SCCDC launched a second community ownership bid which was accepted by Scottish Ministers in November 2013. However, in December 2014, the Council rejected SCCDC's offer, claiming that at £865,000 it was below market value, and instead offered to support SCCDC with a loan. SCCDC dismissed the council's proposal in January 2015, stating that securing the community purchase before a 31 January deadline now had "very little chance of succeeding". By 26 January, 5,600 people had signed an online petition calling on the council to reconsider their decision. The council sold the castle in October 2016, for £1.51 million, to Scottish entrepreneurs and married couple Denice Purdie and Keith Punler, who planned to restore the mansion house and grounds to their former glory.
