= Old Castle Lachlan =

Castle by Loch Fyne, Scotland

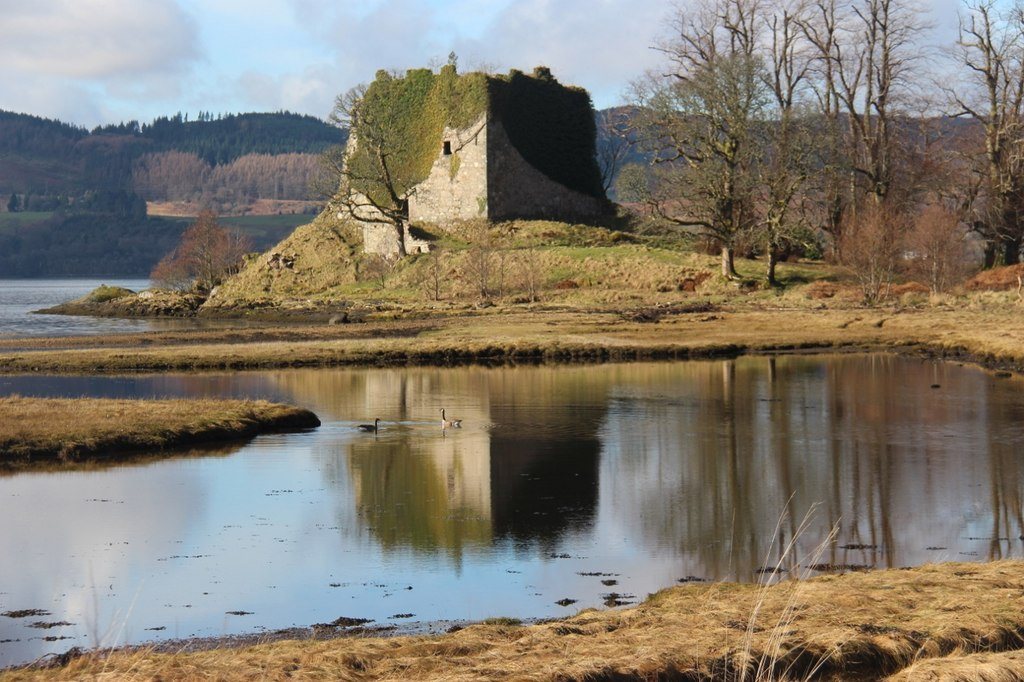
- The castle in 2017

Site information
- Type: Castle
- Open to the public: yes
- Condition: ruin
- Website: Official website

Location
- Location within Argyll and Bute
- Coordinates: 56°06′31″N 5°12′34″W
- Grid reference: grid reference NS0050995292

Site history
- Built: 15th century

Garrison information
- Designations: Scheduled Monument: SM292

Old Castle Lachlan, also known as Castle Lachlan, is a ruined 15th-century castle on the shore of Loch Fyne, on the Cowal Peninsula, in Argyll and Bute, west of Scotland. It was probably built by Clan Maclachlan on lands first recorded in 1314 as "Castlelachlan". Nothing remains of this fourteenth-century castle. Instead, the enclosure of Old Castle Lachlan appears to date to the early fifteenth century, whilst the internal buildings seem to date to the later part of the century. The castle remained a residence of the clan's chiefs until New Castle Lachlan was built as a replacement in 1790, 0.8 kilometres (0.5 mi) east-north-east.

It is protected as a scheduled monument.

Near the castle is Kilmorie Chapel, the resting place of the Maclachlan clan chiefs and one of the few remaining medieval church buildings in the West of Scotland.

== Early history ==
The clan is descended from Lachlan Mor ('Great Lachlan') a powerful chieftain who lived on the shores of Loch Fyne in the 13th century. Lachlan Mor is said to be descended from Anrothan O'Neill an Irish prince who left Ireland in the 11th century. Yet despite MacLachlan's presence little is known about the construction and creation of Old Castle Lachlan. The earliest references date back to 1314, and it is believed to have been built by Clan Lachlan. Other sources stating the first documentary evidence of the clan's ownership of the land known as Strathlachlan on the east of Loch Fyne was in 1292 when Gilleskel Maclachlan received a charter from John, King of Scots. The castle's design however has led architects to date the castle to the late 15th Century, or 16th Century.

The 15th Clan Chief, Archibald MacLachlan was granted a charter confirming his lands of Cowal and Glasrie on him and his male heirs bearing the name and arms of MacLachlan by the crown in 1574.

After aiding the MacGregors in the Battle of Glen Fruin in 1603, and after fighting for Charles in the Battle of Alford in 1645. It was not until 1680 when the Clan is erected into a free Barony consolidating all lands under the Strathlachlan name.

== Battle of Culloden ==
The clan had a long history of support for the 'Prince over the Water', unlike the Campbells across Loch Fyne, Lachlan Maclachlan the 17th Clan Chief was a staunch Jacobites, supporting Viscount Dundee at the Battle of Kiliiecrankie in 1689, James VIII in the 1715 Uprising. Thirty years later in 1745, hopes were rising of the Young Pretender's imminent arrival on Scottish soil, Charles Edward Stuart unfurled his banner on the shore of Glen Shiel, the Highland clans were faced with a momentous choice. Many were 'out' for the Prince, while some wavered, doubting the chances of success and keenly aware of the possible consequences. Lachlan MacLachlan rallied 100 men and went Westwards to Holyrood in Edinburgh.

16 April 1746, Lachlan MacLachlan led a Regiment consisting of 115 MacLachlan's, 182 MacLeans of Mull, whose Chief failed to arrive, into the Battle of Culloden alongside Clan Mackintosh and Clan Chattan. After managing to survive the Hanoverian artillery barrage, the Jacobites launched a fierce offensive against the government lines; However, found themselves outnumbered and retreated towards their lines. Few Clansmen survived, Lachlan MacLachlan himself was a casualty of this battle when he was struck and killed by a cannonball. His body was later found behind Hanoverian lines.

Following the battle, The MacLachlan's were forced to flee the castle as an aftermath of the Jacobite Rebellion. It was bombarded from the sea in 1746, on the orders of Duke of Cumberland. Since then, Old Castle Lachlan has remained uninhabited and has fallen into ruin.

In 1748, Rev. John MacLachlan of Kilchoan, in a letter to Rev. Robert Forbes, Bishop of Ross and Caithness, wrote,

I hope you'll take notice of Collonel MacLachlan of that Ilk, whom the newspapers and magazines neglected. 'Tis true he got but few of his clan rais'd, because most of them are situated amidst the Campbells. However he attended the Prince at Gladsmuir, and march'd with him to Carlyle, from whence he was detach'd by the Prince with an ample commission and 16 horses to lead on to England the 3,000 men that lay then at Perth... ...The Collonel join'd us again at Stirlin, and when we retir'd to Inverness the Prince made him Commissary of the army. At the battle of Culloden he had a regiment of 300 men, whereof 115 were his own people and 182 were Mackleans, who chose to be under his command, seeing their chief was not there. The said Collonel being the last that received orders from the Prince on the field of battle, he was shot by a cannonball as he was advancing on horseback to lead on his regiment, which was drawn up between the Macintoshes and the Stewarts of Appin.

Through the intervention of the Duke of Argyll, the lands were returned to Robert MacLachlan, the 18th Chief, on November 18, 1749, then age 14.

== Modern history ==
Old Castle Lachlan nowadays has become an attraction, drawing in many passersby and fellow MacLachlans. Since 2011, conservationist attempts have been made by Clan MacLachlan to prevent further erosion and the possible collapse. Using traditional masonry techniques, the goal is to preserve Old Castle Lachlan and to protect it from further aging and weathering.
