= Thomas Smibert =

Scottish poet and writer

Thomas Smibert (1810–1854) was a Scottish journalist, writer and poet.

== Life ==
He was born on 8 February 1810 at Peebles, where his father, Thomas Smibert, a leather-merchant, was provost (1808–11); his mother's name was Janet Tait. Educated there, he was apprenticed to a druggist, and then qualified as a surgeon at Edinburgh University.

Smibert set up as a surgeon at Innerleithen, near Peebles, but left after a year when faced by personal and business problems. From Peebles he contributed to Chambers's Edinburgh Journal, of which he became sub-editor and editor between 1837 and 1842. During that period he wrote for the periodical about 650 literary articles, tales, and biographical sketches. He was also a large contributor to Chambers's Information for the People.

In 1842 Smibert became sub-editor of The Scotsman, but a legacy meant he shortly dropped journalism for literature. In his later years he was a frequent contributor to Hogg's Instructor. He died at Edinburgh on 16 January 1854.

== Works ==
Smibert wrote:

- Condé's Wife (1842), a historical play that had a run of nine nights at the Edinburgh Theatre Royal.
- Clans of the Highlands of Scotland (Edinburgh, 1850).
- Io Anche! Poems chiefly Lyrical (Edinburgh, 1851), a collection of his verse including the song The Scottish Widow's Lament, with a Tweeddale setting and in dialect.
