= Clan Wallace =

Lowlands Scottish Clan

- Uallas
- Crest: Issuant from a crest coronet of four (three visible) strawberry leaves Or, a dexter arm vambraced, the hand brandishing a sword all Proper
- Motto: Pro libertate (For liberty)
- War cry: Freedom

Profile
- Region: Lowlands
- District: Ayrshire and Renfrewshire
- Plant badge: Oak

Chief
- Andrew Robert Wallace
- 36th Chief of the Name and Arms of Wallace
- Historic seat: Craigie Castle, Ayrshire; Auchenbathie Tower
Clan branches
Wallace of Cragie
Wallace of Cairnhill
Wallace of Cessnock
Wallace of Elderslie
Wallace of Auchenbathie Tower
Wallace of Kelly
Wallace of Riccarton.
Wallace of Carnell.
Wallace of Sundrum.
Allied clans
Clan Bruce
Clan Campbell
Clan Cathcart
Clan Cumming
Clan MacDougall
Clan Graham
Clan Crawford
Clan Lennox
Clan Lindsay
Clan Murray
Clan Hamilton

The Clan Wallace is a Lowlands Scottish Clan and is officially recognized as such by the Lord Lyon King of Arms. The most famous member of the clan was the Scottish patriot William Wallace of the late 13th and early 14th centuries.

== History ==
=== Origins of the clan ===
The Wallace family first came to Scotland with a Breton family in the 11th century. David I of Scotland was eager to extend the benefits of Norman influence and gave grants to the nobles of the south. Among them was Walter FitzAlan, who the Scottish king appointed his Steward in 1136. One of FitzAlan's followers was Richard Wallace from Oswestry who came north to try to improve his fortunes. Oswestry is on the Welsh border. So it is possible that the name Wallace may be a corruption of Le Waleis meaning 'the Welshman'. A similar theory is the name being derived from the Old English wǣlisċ, meaning 'foreigner' or 'Welshman'. However, while it is possible that the Wallaces in the Clyde area were originally Britons from Wales, who came north with David I of Scotland in the eleventh century, another theory is that they were Britons who had settled in the Kingdom of Strathclyde in the tenth century, as the 'Welsh' term was also used for the Cumbric-speaking Celtic Britons of that area.

The steward received from King David lands in Ayrshire and so it was here that his follower Richard Wallace settled. Richard Wallace was granted his own estate in Kyle, where it is claimed that his name Richard is still remembered in the placename of the village of Riccarton. Richard Wallace (Walensis) held lands in Kilmarnock and was a vassal of the High Steward of Scotland before 1160. His grandson was Adam Walays who in turn had two sons, the eldest of whom succeeded to the family estates in Ayrshire. Adam's younger son was Malcolm Wallace who received the lands of Auchinbothie and Elderslie in Renfrewshire.

=== Wars of Scottish Independence ===
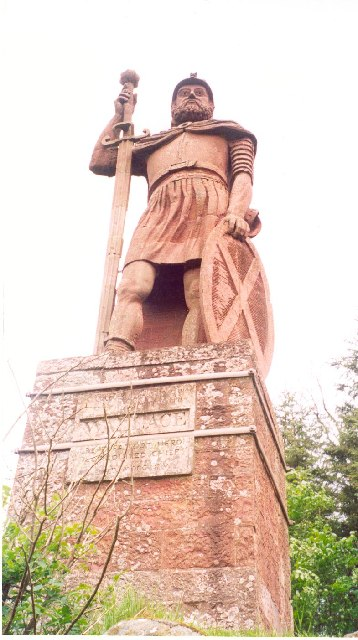
William Wallace Statue, Dryburgh.

Malcolm Wallace appears in the Ragman Rolls of 1296 paying allegiance to Edward I of England, however later he was one of the few Scottish nobles who refused to submit to Edward and as a result he and his son, Andrew, were executed. According to some sources Malcolm was the father of the Scottish patriot William Wallace, however the seal of William Wallace, rediscovered in 1999, identifies him as the son of Alan Wallace of Ayrshire, who also appears in the Ragman Roll of 1296 as "crown tenant of Ayrshire". Dr. Fiona Watson in "A Report into Sir William Wallace's connections with Ayrshire", published in March 1999, reassesses the early life of William Wallace and concludes, "Sir William Wallace was a younger son of Alan Wallace, a crown tenant in Ayrshire".

During the Wars of Scottish Independence William Wallace and Andrew de Moray began a successful military guerrilla campaign against the English. In 1297 they won a great and stunning victory over the English at the Battle of Stirling Bridge, after which Wallace was knighted as Guardian of Scotland. Wallace was also in command at the Battle of Falkirk in 1298, but there he was defeated by the superiority of the English numbers. Wallace was eventually captured at Robroyston near Glasgow and delivered to Edward Longshanks of England by a senior Scottish law officer – Sir John Mentieth. Wallace was subjected to a show trial, in which he was found guilty of treason and hanged, drawn, and quartered at Smithfield, London in 1305.

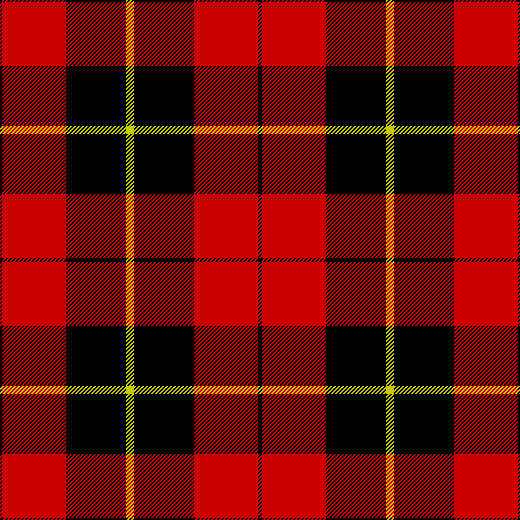
Wallas tartan, as published in 1842 in Vestiarium Scoticum.

=== Border wars ===
The Wallaces of Cragie from whom the senior branch of the clan is descended obtained their estate during the late 14th century, through the marriage to the heiress of Sir John Lindsay of Cragie. In October 1449, Sir John Wallace of Cragie was a commander at the victory over the English, at the Battle of Sark. William Wallace of Carnell was killed at the Battle of Flodden in 1513.

=== 17th century and civil war ===
The Wallaces of Cragie branch descend from the uncle of the patriot, William Wallace, and in 1669 Hugh Wallace of Craigie was created a Baronet of Nova Scotia.

A contemporary Wallace, James Wallace served as a captain under General Robert Monro when he occupied Huntly Castle of the Clan Gordon in 1640. Another contemporary Wallace, Sir Hugh Wallace, a royalist raised a regiment for King Charles Stuart during the Puritan revolution of Oliver Cromwell.

In 1669 Hugh Wallace of Cragie was one of the Scottish nobility who was created a Baronet of Nova Scotia under Sir William Alexander of Menstrie's scheme to promote that part of Canada as a Scottish colony.

Also in the 17th century, mathematician John Wallis was the first to deal with the concept of infinity mathematically and paved the way for the development of calculus and binomial theorem in his 1657 work Arithmetica Infinitorum.

=== Wallaces in the 19th century ===
In the 19th century, eminent naturalist and author, Alfred Russel Wallace, developed his own theories on evolution, based on his studies of flora and fauna in South America and in the East Indies, independently of Charles Darwin. Both theories were published simultaneously in 1858. Thomas Wallace served as the vice-president of the British Board of Trade, who in 1821, cut the duties long imposed on Baltic timber; the act heralded the end of the mercantile system that had existed since England had first established colonies. Sociologist Graham Wallas was an early leader of the Fabian Society, along with George Bernard Shaw, an organization which promoted the peaceful and democratic "permeation of (British) politics with socialist and collectivist ideas." Sir Richard Wallace was a great collector of painting, sculpture and furniture, primarily 18th-century French. He bequeathed his collections to the people of Britain; upon his death in 1897 they became known as the National Wallace Collection.

== Chief ==
The current Chief of the Name and Arms of Wallace is Andrew Robert Wallace, son of former chief Ian Francis Wallace of that Ilk, the who died on 14 May 2016 at the age of 89. Andrew Wallace is the 36th Chief of Clan Wallace.

Ian, the former Chief, was the 35th Chief of the Clan. He became Chief upon the death of his brother, Lt. Col. Malcolm Robert Wallace, on 9 December 1990.

Born 28 September 1926 Ian is the son of Colonel Robert Francis Hunter Wallace of that Ilk and Euphemia Hoskyns. On February 2, 1963 he married Teresa Hyne Buckingham, daughter of Reverend Christopher Leigh Buckingham. Educated at Stowe School, Buckingham, Buckinghamshire, England. He graduated from New College, Oxford University, Oxford, Oxfordshire, England, with a Master of Arts. He gained the rank of Lieutenant in the service of the Royal Army Service Corps and Arab Legion.

Ian lived with his family in Edinburgh. With Teresa he had three children; Andrew Robert Wallace of that Ilk, younger, Henrietta Katherine Wallace and James Christopher Wallace".

Andrew Wallace was born in February 1964, only 500 yards from the location where William Wallace was executed. Though he was born in England and his mother is English he maintains that he is decidedly Scottish.

== Castles ==
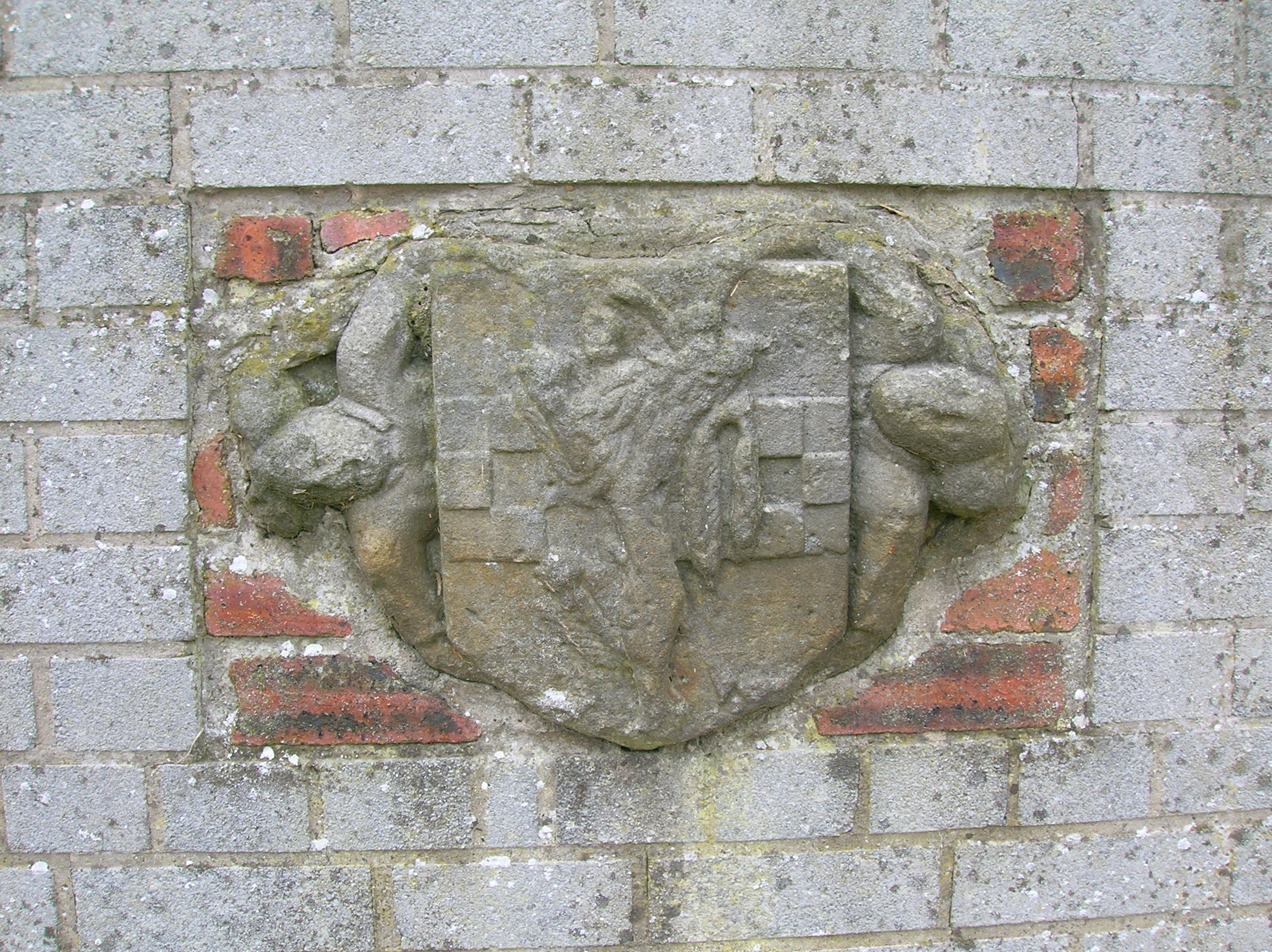
Wallace and Lyndsay conjoiner Coat of Arms and supporters from Craigie Castle, Ayrshire.

Castles that have belonged to the Clan Wallace have included amongst others:

- Riccarton Castle, Riccarton, Ayrshire is named after Richard Wallace (Richard's Town). The lands were held by the Wallaces from the thirteenth century or earlier and they had a castle there. Malcolm Wallace, is said to have been born there and a plaque now marks the site.
- Wallace's Buildings, in the village of Elderslie, Renfrewshire is said to have been the birthplace of the patriot William Wallace, son of Alan Wallace, although there are other places that have also been suggested. It was a property of the Wallaces from the thirteenth century to about 1850. The buildings have now been demolished and all that remains are a grassy mound and a monument.
- Craigie Castle, Ayrshire, four miles south of Kilmarnock dates from the thirteenth century and consists of a ruined hall house and castle. It was originally held by the Clan Lindsay but passed to the Wallaces of Riccarton in 1371. The Wallaces of Riccarton had Blind Harry collect and record stories here about the patriot William Wallace. The castle was abandoned in about 1600 when the Wallaces moved to Newton in Ayr.
- Craigie House, near Ayr dates from 1730 and was built by the Wallaces of Craigie. It is a three-storey mansion with a bow-windowed front. It went to the Clan Campbell in 1782 and was sold to the local council in 1942. It later became a management centre for Paisley University and the grounds are open to the public.
- Auchenbathie Tower, also known as Auchenbathie Castle, near Beith, was held by the Wallaces of Elderslie but now only ruins remain.
- Busbie Castle, also known as Busbie Tower, near Kilmarnock, Ayrshire was held by the Wallaces but later passed to the Mowats.
- Carnell Estate, near Kilmarnock, Ayrshire, was held by the Wallaces of Carnell. William Wallace of Carnell was killed at the Battle of Flodden in 1513.
- Crosbie Castle, near West Kilbride, Ayrshire was held by the Wallaces and William Wallace the patriot is said to have sheltered here from the English in an earlier castle.
- Sundrum Castle near Ayr was held by the Wallaces of Sundrum from 1373 or earlier.

== Septs ==
There are no sept families of Clan Wallace, just Wallace. This is the decision of the current clan chief.

Some of the many ways of spelling the name attributed to the family of:
Most common Wallace - and second most common: Wallis
Walla, Wallais, Wallace, Wallice, Wallang, Wallass, Wallayis, Wallays, Walleis, Wallensis, Walles, Walleyis, Walleys, Walli, Wallis, Walls, Wallyis, Wallys, Walker, Walois, Walys
- Waces, Wal’, Walace, Walais, Walans, Walas, Walays, Wale, Waleis, Walency, Walens, Walense, Walensen, Walensi, Walensis, Wales, Waless, Wylie, Waleyss
- Valance, Valensis, Valeyns, Vallace, Vallance, Valles, Valleyis, Vallibus (Not Vallibus, which has always signified the family of de Vaux or Vaus)
- Uallas (Scottish Gaelic)
- Gadhel, Galeis, Galeius, Gales, Galeys, Galleius, Grieve, Galleius, Galles, Galles, Gallia, Gallois, Gaul, Gweddol

== Clan profile ==
- Arms of the Chiefs: Gules, a Lion rampant argent, armed azure, a Bordure counter compony azure and argent.
- Crest Badge: Issuant from a crest coronet of four (three visible) strawberry leaves Or, a dexter arm vambraced, the hand brandishing a sword all Proper.
- Natural Badge of water: A sprig of oak fructed Proper.
- Motto: Pro Libertate - "For liberty".
- Gaelic Name: Uallas
- Tartans: Red Wallace, Green Wallace, Blue Wallace; each available in modern, ancient and weathered hues and all invented in relatively recent times.

== See also ==
- William Wallace
- Scottish clan
- Craigie Castle, Ayrshire
- Wallace Monument
- Wallace's Monument, Ayrshire
