= New Castle Lachlan =

Country house in Argyll and Bute, Scotland

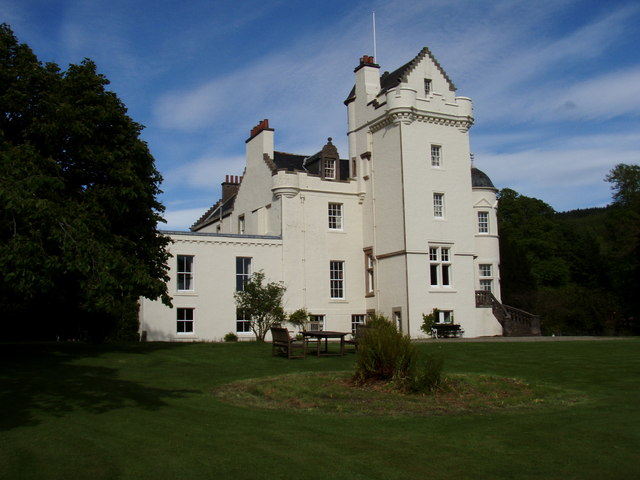
- New Castle Lachlan in 2007
- Interactive map of the New Castle Lachlan area

General information
- Location: Cowal Peninsula, Argyll and Bute, Scotland, United Kingdom, Strathlachlan, Scotland
- Coordinates: 56.111°N 5.194°W grid reference NS 01298 95558

New Castle Lachlan, is an 18th-century baronial mansion or country house located at Strathlachlan, Cowal peninsula, Argyll and Bute, Scotland.

== History ==
It was built in 1790 by Donald Maclachlan, 19th laird, to replace the 15th century Old Castle Lachlan, which stands nearby on the shores of Loch Fyne. The building is protected as a category C listed building.

The building was remodelled around 1910 by the architect George Mackie Watson.

Part of the residence now operates a holiday lets business. With space for up to 15 guests with 8 bedrooms.

== Gallery ==
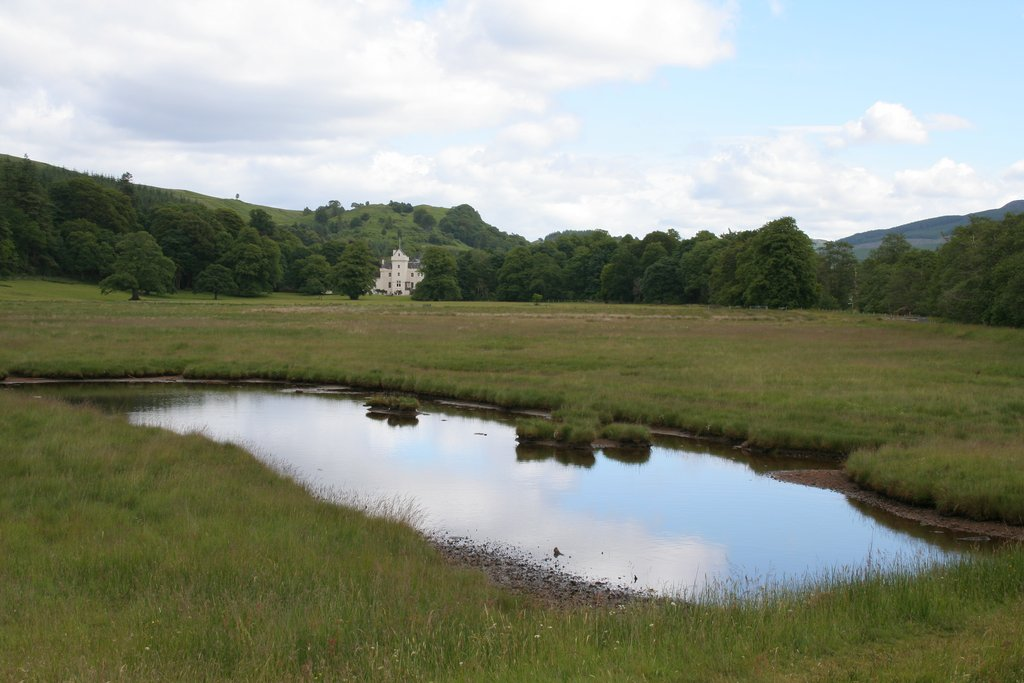
The castle from the pond in 2008

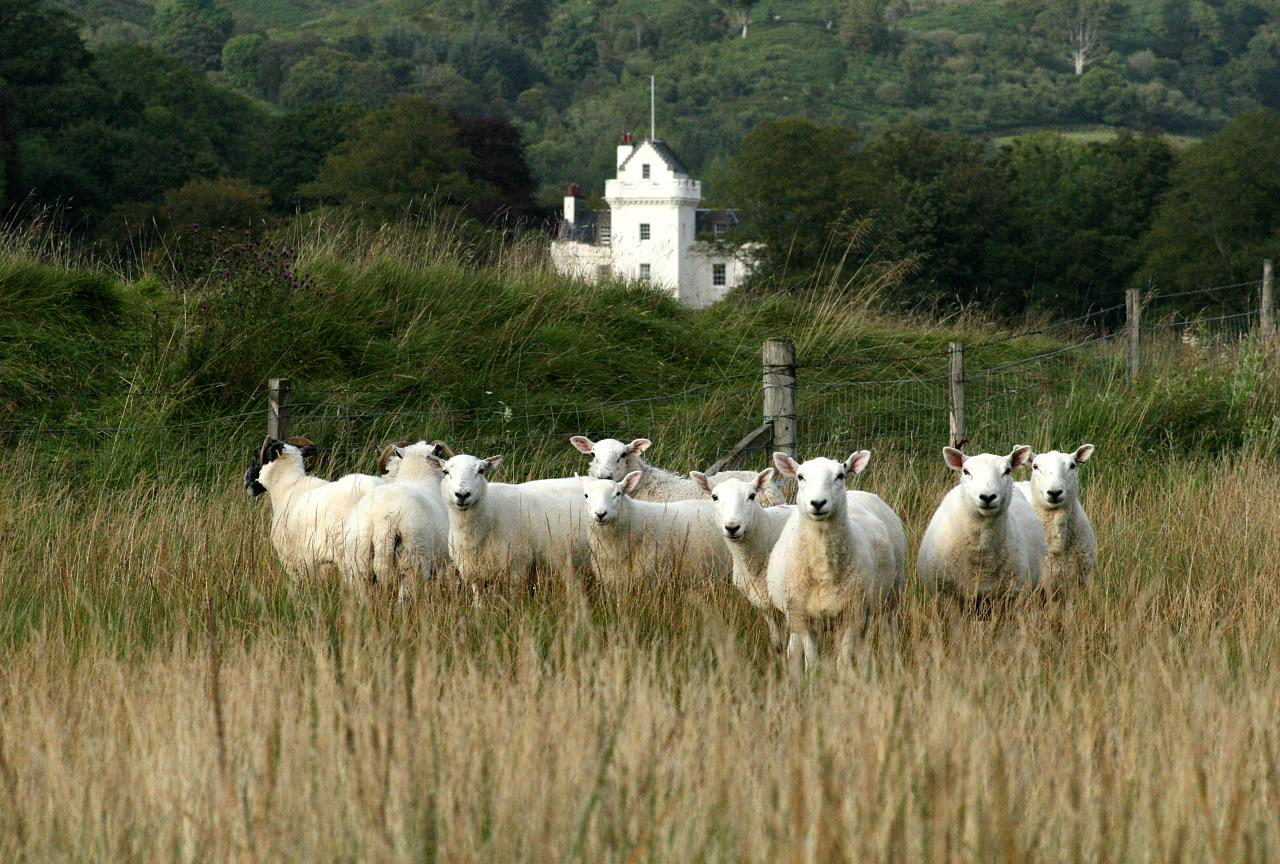
The castle as seen from the meadow in 2007

== See also ==
- Old Castle Lachlan
