= Clarke & Bell & R. A. Bryden =

Scottish architectural firm

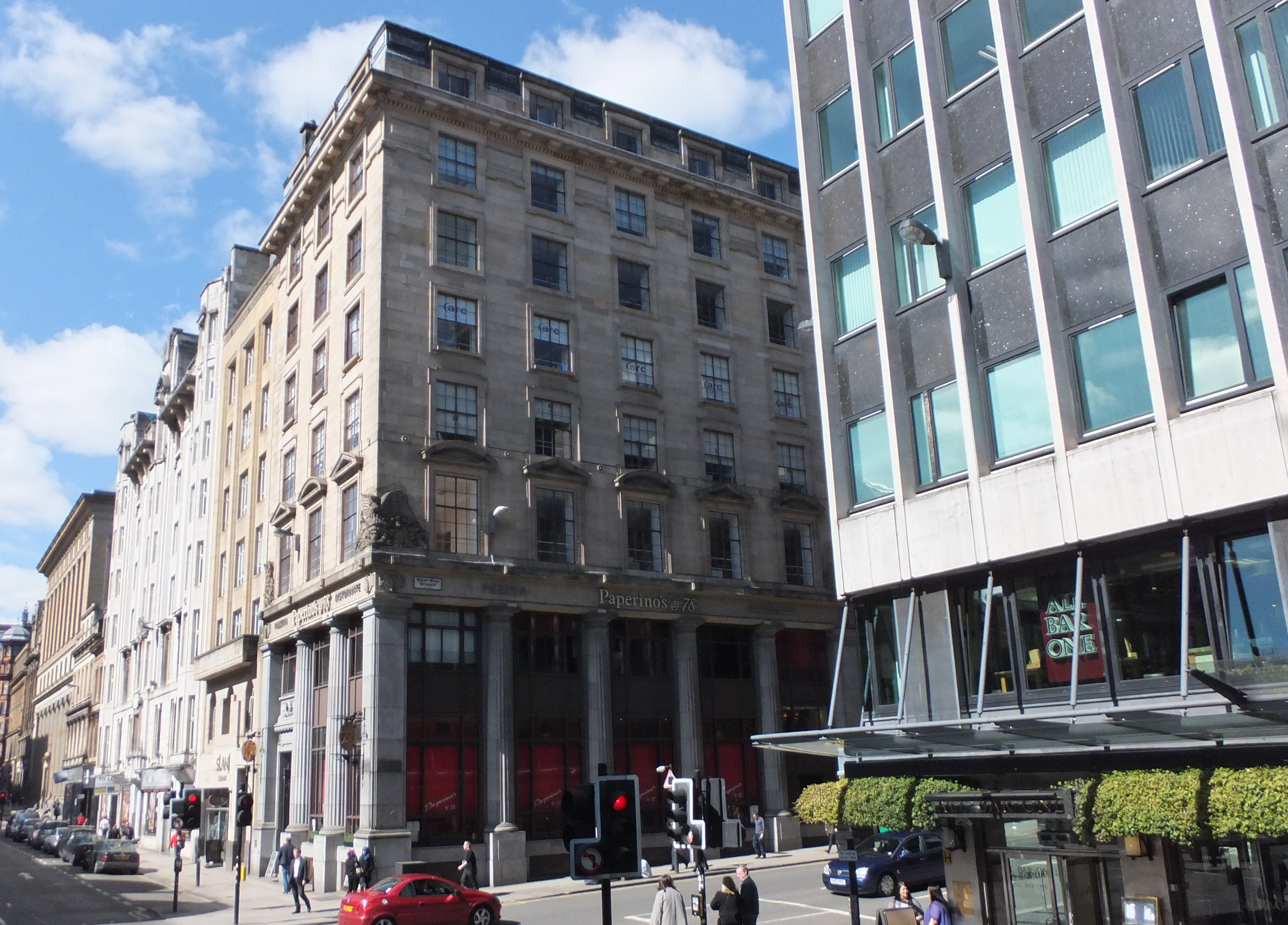
- The firm's offices were in this building on West Nile Street, Glasgow

Practice information
- Key architects: William Clarke; George Bell; Robert Alexander Bryden; George Bell II
- Founded: c. 1875
- Dissolved: 1902 (123 years ago)
- Location: Glasgow, Scotland

Significant works and honors
- Design: Dunoon Burgh Hall; Dunoon Infants' School; Dunoon Pier

Clarke & Bell & R. A. Bryden was a major Scottish architectural firm based in Glasgow, created by William Clarke (1809–1889), George Bell (1814–1887) and Robert Alexander Bryden (1841–1906) around 1875. The practice dissolved in 1902, but several of their designs are now listed buildings.

Bryden was initially an apprentice with the partnership, and by the mid-1870s he appeared to hold a senior position within the firm. It is not clear if he was a partner at that time. He appears to have run another practice concurrently beside the Clarke & Bell enterprise, for it was based at the same 37 West Nile Street office. This lasted until 1891, when he was again only of Clarke & Bell, this time as a formal partner. Clarke had died two years earlier, and Bell four. Bell's son, George II, was made a partner in 1880 and was in charge of the firm.

Bryden was again running his own practice, behind a glazed door within the Clarke & Bell office, by the time of the partnership's dissolution in 1902. That year, he and his son, Andrew, went into partnership and moved out of the Clarke & Bell office, by which time was at 212 St Vincent Street in Glasgow, and into 147 Bath Street.

== List of selected works ==
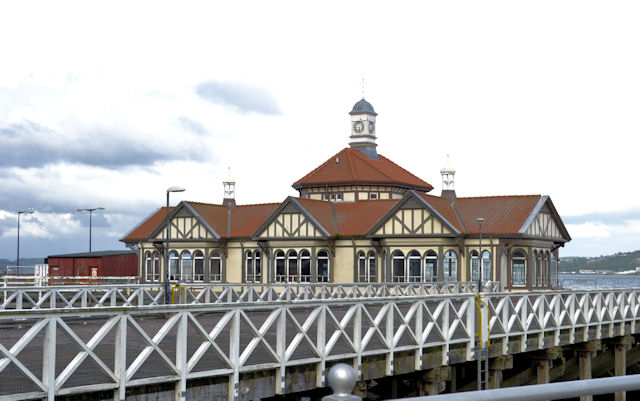
Dunoon Pier

- St Cuthbert's Church, Dunoon (1874; now demolished)
- Avondale Parish Church (1875)
- Western Baths, Glasgow (1876)
- St John's Church (Dunoon Free Church) (1877) – now Category A listed
- Dunoon Infants' School (1880) – now Category B listed
- Seafield House and lodge (1880) – now Category B listed
- Jubilee Fountain, Jedburgh (1889)
- Dunoon Burgh Hall (1893) – now Category B listed; additions, alterations, new gallery and decoration (Bryden designed the building in 1874)
- Dunoon Pier and offices (1896) – rebuilding, in collaboration with Sir William Robertson Copland and C. J. M. Mackintosh
- Charles Cameron Memorial Fountain, Glasgow (1896) – now Category B listed
