= Jeanie Stewart Oswald =

Jeanie Stewart Oswald (born May 1884, Dunoon, Scotland) was a Scottish early female academic. Oswald went to Dunoon Grammer School where she topped her year in 1896 and, over the next few years, won prizes in subjects such as inorganic chemistry, French, German, English, drawing, composition, maths, and arithmetic. She also received an award from Trinity College London recognizing her pianoforte skills. Jeanie attended the University of Glasgow after being awarded a scholarship from the Highland and Islands Education Trust to support her studies in 1900. She graduated from the University of Glasgow with an MA degree in 1906 in English literature and natural philosophy.
