= Robert Alexander Bryden =

Scottish architect (1841–1906)

- Bryden towards the end of his life
- Born: 7 July 1841; Glasgow, Lanarkshire, Scotland
- Died: 14 April 1906 (aged 64); Glasgow, Lanarkshire, Scotland
- Occupation: Architect

Robert Alexander Bryden (7 July 1841 – 14 April 1906) was a Scottish architect, prominent in the second half of the 19th century. He was mainly active in the west of Scotland, where he designed schools, churches and municipal buildings.

== Early life ==
Bryden was born in Glasgow, Scotland, in 1841, the son of Robert Bryden and Margaret Ramage.

He was educated at Arthur's Academy in Dunoon, Argyll, and Kirkcaldy Grammar School.

== Career ==
In the 1860s, he was an apprentice at Glasgow-based practice Clarke & Bell, of whom he became a partner around 1875. He was elected a Fellow of the Royal Institute of British Architects in 1878.

Around 1875, Robert Alexander Bryden, with William Clarke (1809–1889) and George Bell (1814–1887) created the Clarke & Bell & R. A. Bryden, a major architectural firm based in Glasgow. The practice dissolved in 1902, but several of their designs are now listed buildings.

=== Selected works ===
Selected works include:

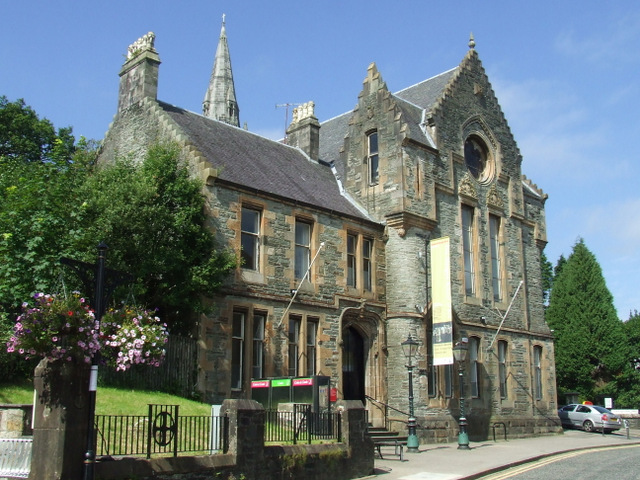
Dunoon Burgh Hall

- Dunoon Burgh Hall (1873)
- St Cuthbert's Church, Dunoon (1874; now demolished)
- St John's Church, Dunoon (1876)
- Martin's Memorial Church, Stornoway (1877-78)
- Dunoon Infants' School (1880)
- Broughton Parish Church (rebuilding; 1886)
- Seafield Children's Hospital (rebuilding; 1888)
- Lanarkshire Regimental Drill Hall, Glasgow (1894)
- Dunoon Pier and offices (rebuilding; 1896)
- Sir Charles Cameron Memorial Fountain, Glasgow (1896) – the clocktower dome of the fountain

== Personal life ==
Bryden married Elizabeth Robertson, daughter of Alexander Robertson. They had at least one child, a son named Andrew Francis Stewart Bryden (1876–1917), who also became a noted architect and a Fellow of RIBA. For the final few years of his father's life, the two worked as partners.

== Death ==
Bryden died in Glasgow in 1906, aged 64. He is interred in Dunoon Cemetery, half a mile to the north of Dunoon Burgh Hall, one of his designs. He is believed to be the subject of the building's stained-glass window.
