= Robert Buchanan (playwright) =

Robert Buchanan (1785–1873) was a Scottish minister and Professor of Logic and Rhetoric at the University of Glasgow, known as a dramatist and poet.

== Life ==
Buchanan was a cadet of the Clan Buchanan, and a native of Callander, where he was born in 1785. He specially distinguished himself in the philosophy classes. After completing his divinity course at the University of Glasgow, he was in 1812 licensed as a preacher of the Church of Scotland by the presbytery of Haddington, and in 1813 was presented to the parish of Peebles.

In 1824 Buchanan was appointed assistant and successor to George Jardine in the chair of Logic and Rhetoric at Glasgow, becoming sole professor in 1827. As a philosopher he was influenced by his teacher James Mylne, and was wary of the philosophy of commonsense. Following Jardine, and with the support of Mylne's successor William Fleming, he resisted attempts to bring Glasgow's courses more in line with those taught in England.

In 1864, Buchanan retired to Ardfillayne, Dunoon. He died on 2 March 1873 and is buried in Dunoon Cemetery.

== Legacy ==
In commemoration of Buchanan's services, the Buchanan prizes were instituted in 1866, for students of the logic, moral philosophy, and English literature classes of the University of Glasgow. By his will he bequeathed £10,000 for the founding of Buchanan bursaries, for the arts classes of the university.

== Works ==
Buchanan was the author of:

- Fragments of the Table Round, 1860;
- Vow of Glentreuil, and other Poems, 1862;
- Wallace, a Tragedy, 1856;
- Tragic Dramas from Scottish History, 1868, containing: The British Brothers; Gaston Phœbus; Edinburga; and the tragedies of Wallace and King James the First.
- Anonymous, Canute's Birthday in Ireland, a Drama in Five Acts, in 1868.

Buchanan's tragedy Wallace was performed twice for a charitable object at the Prince's Theatre, Glasgow, in March 1862, the major characters being played by students.

== Notes ==
Attribution

This article incorporates text from a publication now in the public domain: Stephen, Leslie, ed. (1886). "Buchanan, Robert (1785-1873)". Dictionary of National Biography. Vol. 7. London: Smith, Elder & Co.
