= Professor of Logic and Rhetoric =

The Professor of Logic and Rhetoric is a professorship at the University of Glasgow. The Nova Erectio of King James VI of Scotland shared the teaching of moral philosophy, logic and natural philosophy among the Regents.

In 1727, separate chairs were instituted, one of which was the Chair of Logic and Rhetoric.

== Holders of the Chair of Logic and Rhetoric ==
- John Loudon MA (1727)
- Adam Smith MA LLD (1751) Later Professor of Moral Philosophy and Rector
- James Clow MA (1752)
- George Jardine MA (1774)
- Robert Buchanan MA LLD (1827)
- John Veitch MA LLD (1864)
- Robert Adamson MA LLD (1895)
- Robert Latta MA DPhil LLD (1902)
- Archibald Allan Bowman MA LittD (1925) Later Professor of Moral Philosophy
- Herbert James Paton MA DLitt (1927)
- Charles Arthur Campbell MA DLitt (1938)
- Rodney Julian Hurst MA (1961–1981)
- Alexander Broadie MA PhD DLitt FRSE FBA (1995)
- Fraser MacBride MA MPhil PhD (2013–16)
- Jack Lyons BA PhD (2020-)

== Sources ==
- Who, What and Where: The History and Constitution of the University of Glasgow, compiled by Michael Moss, Moira Rankin and Lesley Richmond.
