= John Veitch (poet) =

Scottish poet, philosopher, and historian (1829–1894)

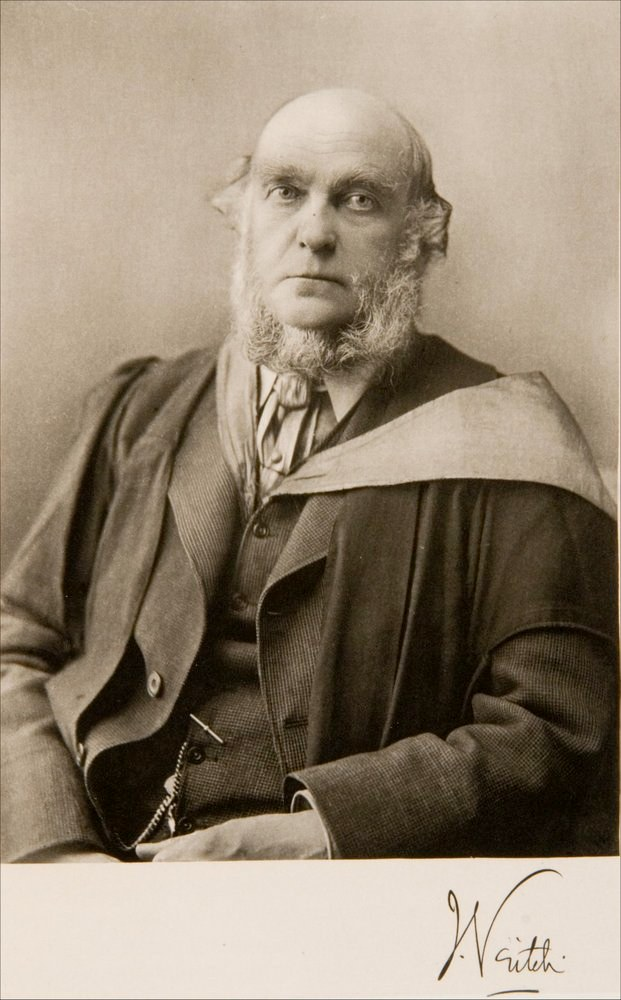

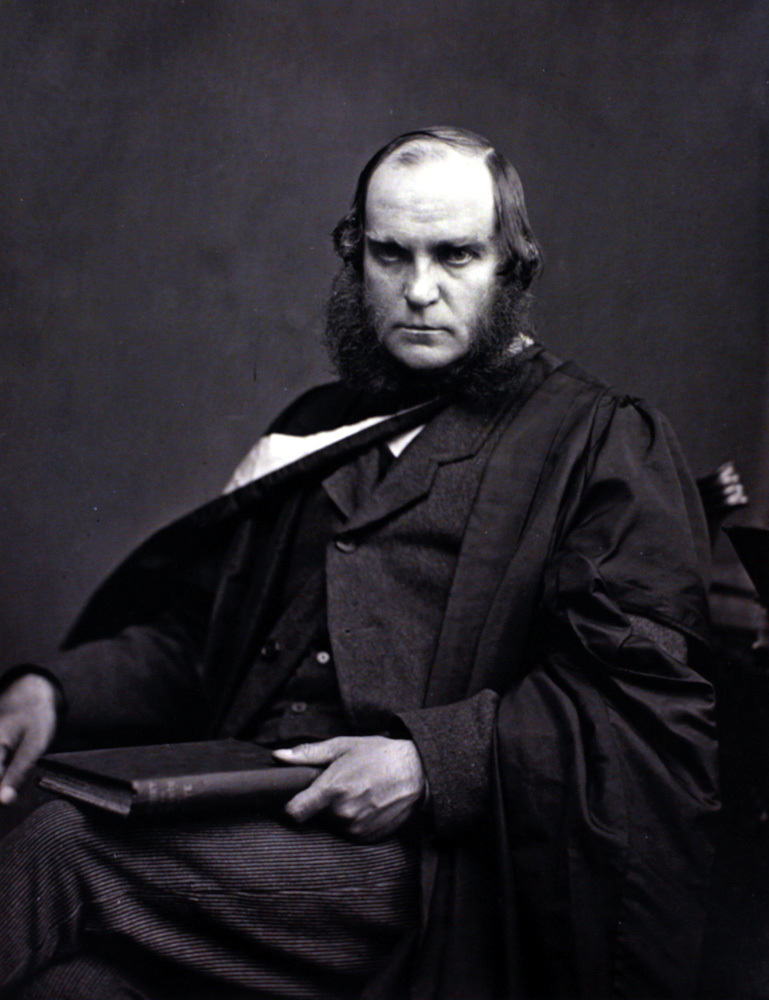
John Veitch

John Veitch (24 October 1829 – 3 September 1894), Scottish philosopher, poet and historian: John was born in Peebles; the only son of Peninsular War veteran James Veitch and his wife, Nancy Ritchie; a woman, steeped in the folk traditions of the Borders; he was educated at the University of Edinburgh.

He was assistant lecturer successively to Sir William Hamilton and Alexander Campbell Fraser (1856–60). In 1860 he was appointed to the chair of logic, metaphysics and rhetoric at the University of St Andrews, and in 1864 to the corresponding chair at the University of Glasgow.

In St. Andrews, he lived at 8 Playfair Terrace.

In Glasgow, he lectured to working men and women and between 1877 and 1883 put on courses for the Glasgow Association for the Higher Education of Women. He founded the Scottish Mountaineering Club in 1892. He deplored the damaging environmental impacts of industrialisation and campaigned to save old buildings.

In philosophy an intuitionist, he was dismissive of idealist arguments. He is remembered chiefly for his work on the literature and antiquities of the Scottish Borders. See Memoir by his niece, Mary RL Bryce (1896).

== Publications ==
- Translations of Descartes' Discours de la méthode (1850) and Méditationes (1852)
- An edition of Sir William Hamilton's lectures with memoir (1869, in collaboration with HL Mansel)
- The Tweed and other Poems (1875)
- Lucretius and the Atomic Theory (1875)
- The History and Poetry of the Scottish Border (1877; ed. 1893)
- Hamilton (1882)
- The River Tweed from its Source to the Sea (1884)
- Institutes of Logic (1885)
- The Feeling for Nature in Scottish Poetry (1887)
- Knowing and Being (1889)
- Merlin (1889)
- Dualism and Monism (1895)
- Border Essays (1896)
