= HMS Untamed =

Submarine of the Royal Navy

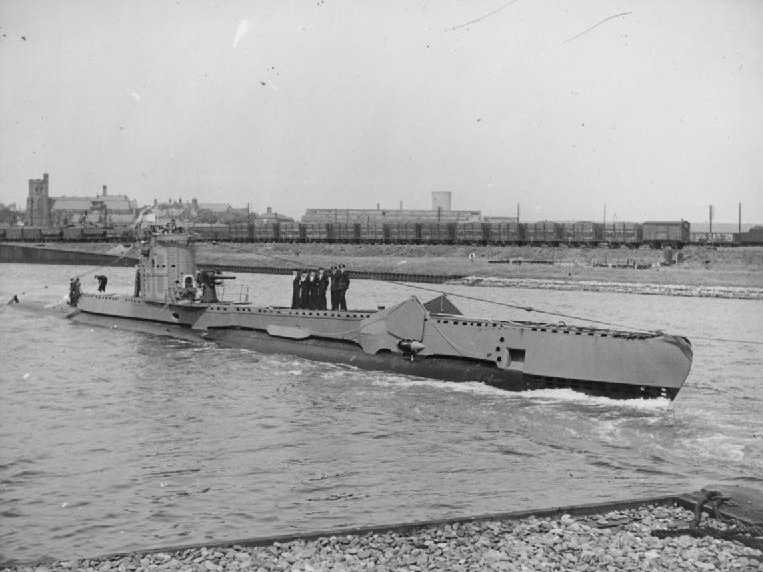
- HMS Vitality moving away from the quayside with some of the crew on deck

History

United Kingdom
- Name: HMS Untamed
- Builder: Vickers-Armstrongs, High Walker
- Laid down: 9 October 1941
- Launched: 8 December 1942
- Commissioned: 14 April 1943
- Identification: Pennant number: P58
- Fate: Sunk on 30 May 1943; Salvaged on 5 July 1943; Recommissioned
- Badge

United Kingdom
- Name: HMS Vitality
- Commissioned: July 1944
- Fate: Sold for scrapping on 13 February 1946
- Badge

General characteristics
- Class & type: U-class submarine
- Displacement: Surfaced - 540 tons standard, 630 tons full load; Submerged - 730 tons
- Length: 191 ft (58.2 m)
- Beam: 16 ft 1 in (4.9 m)
- Draught: 15 ft 2 in (4.6 m)
- Propulsion: 2 shaft diesel-electric; 2 Paxman Ricardo diesel generators + electric motors; 615 / 825 hp
- Speed: 11.25 knots (20.84 km/h; 12.95 mph) max surfaced; 10 knots (19 km/h; 12 mph) max submerged
- Complement: 27-31
- Armament: 4 x bow internal 21 inch (533 mm)torpedo tubes - 8 - 10 torpedoes; 1 x 3-inch (76 mm) gun

HMS Untamed was a Royal Navy U-class submarine built by Vickers-Armstrongs, High Walker. So far, she has been the only ship of the Royal Navy to bear the name Untamed. On 30 May 1943, she sank during a training exercise in the Firth of Clyde with the loss of all 35 of her crew. Untamed was subsequently salvaged and renamed HMS Vitality, another unique name, and lasted until 1946, when she was scrapped.

== Sinking ==
Untamed was on a training exercise with the 8th Escort Group in the Firth of Clyde on 30 May 1943 acting as a target. In the second exercise that day, Untamed was used as a target for anti-submarine mortar practice by the yacht HMS Shemara. When the submarine did not respond to attempts to contact her nor surface, assistance was summoned. Shemara located Untamed with sonar and heard the sounds of her engines being run and tanks being blown. HMS Thrasher arrived but no more was heard from Untamed after 17:45 – nearly three hours from the first indication of a problem. Weather prevented divers inspecting the submarine until 1 June. There was no outward sign of damage and it was not until after Untamed was salvaged on 5 July 1943 that it was found that she had been flooded through a sluice valve.

Untamed was salvaged, refitted and named Vitality, returning to service in July 1944. As Vitality, she had a short and uneventful career and was sold to be broken up for scrap on 13 February 1946. She was broken up at Troon.

The Sandbank War Memorial at Hunters Quay is in part dedicated to the crew of Untamed who were buried in Dunoon Cemetery.
