= William Fraser (architect) =

Scottish architect (1867–1922)

William Fraser RIBA
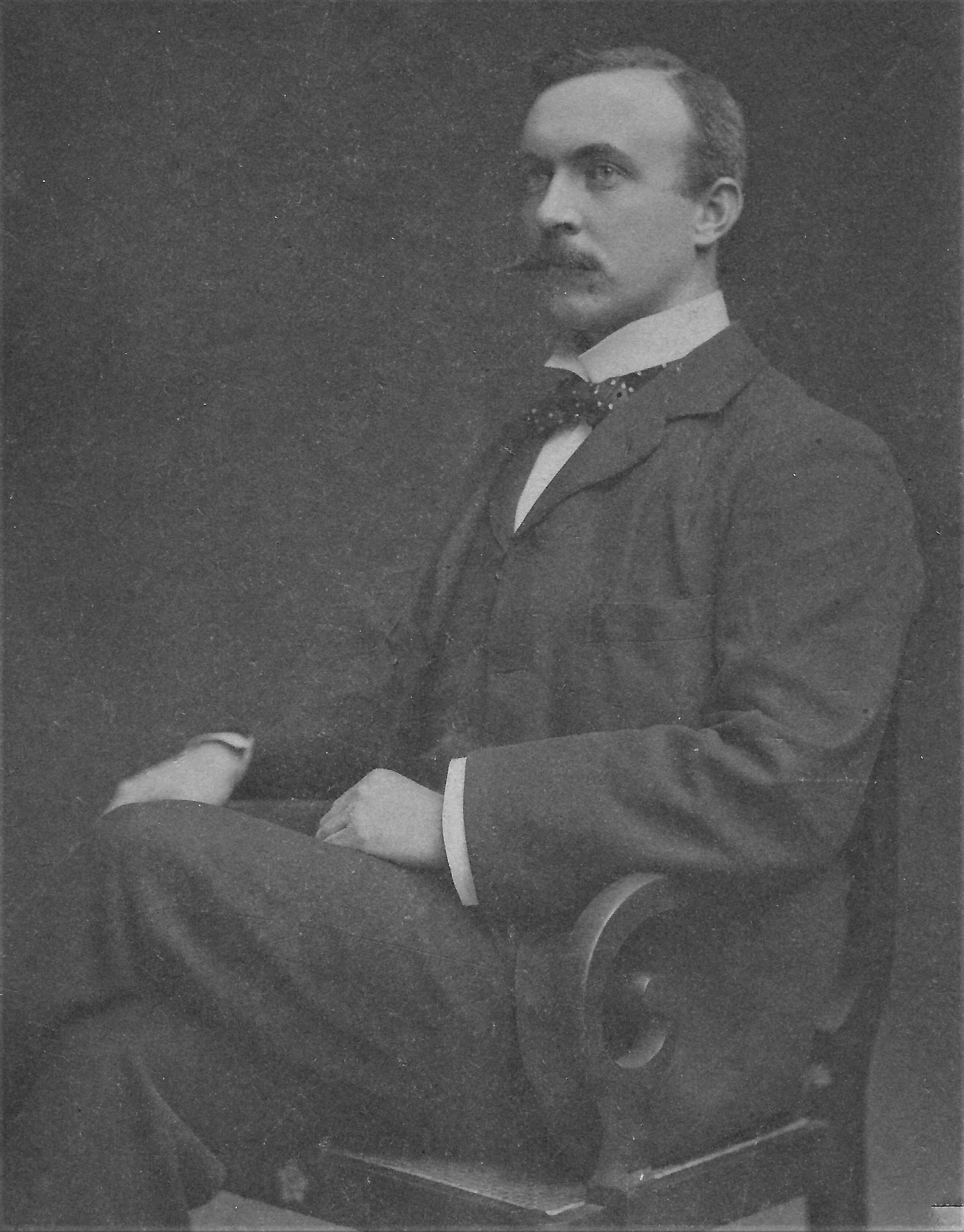
- Fraser, circa 1898
- Born: 24 October 1867; Lochgilphead, Scotland
- Died: 14 June 1922 (aged 54); Toronto, Canada
- Education: University of Glasgow

William Fraser RIBA (24 October 1867 – 14 June 1922) was a Scottish-born architect, prominent in the late 19th and early 20th centuries, who practised in Great Britain and Canada.

== Early life ==
Born in the town of Lochgilphead, Argyll, in western Scotland, Fraser was the second of eight children born to The Reverend William Fraser (1824–1892), minister of the Free Church of Scotland in Lochgilphead, and Violet Ferguson (1835–1888). His younger brother was the missionary Donald Fraser.

Fraser studied at the University of Glasgow.

== Career ==
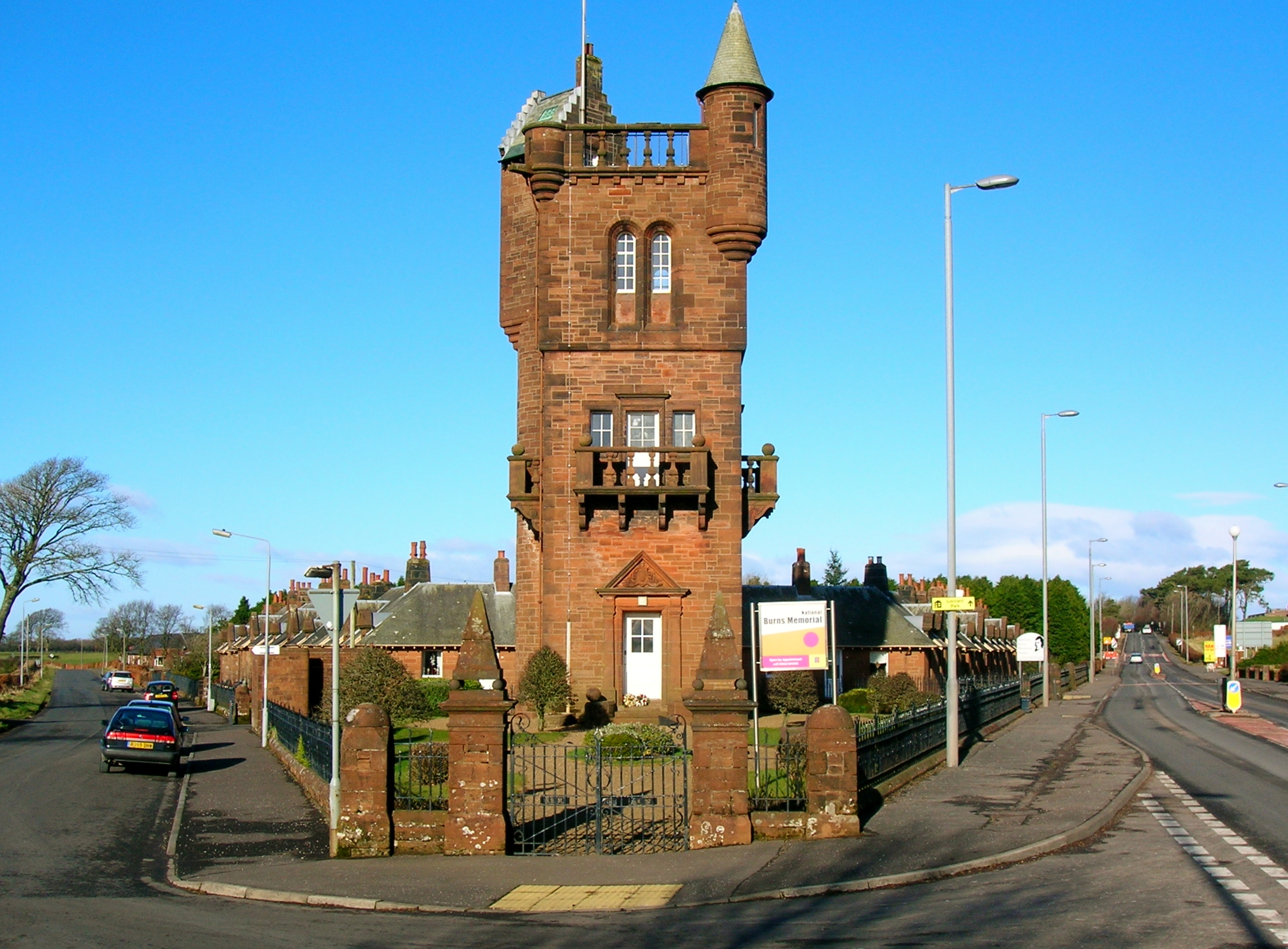
The Burns Memorial and Cottage Homes

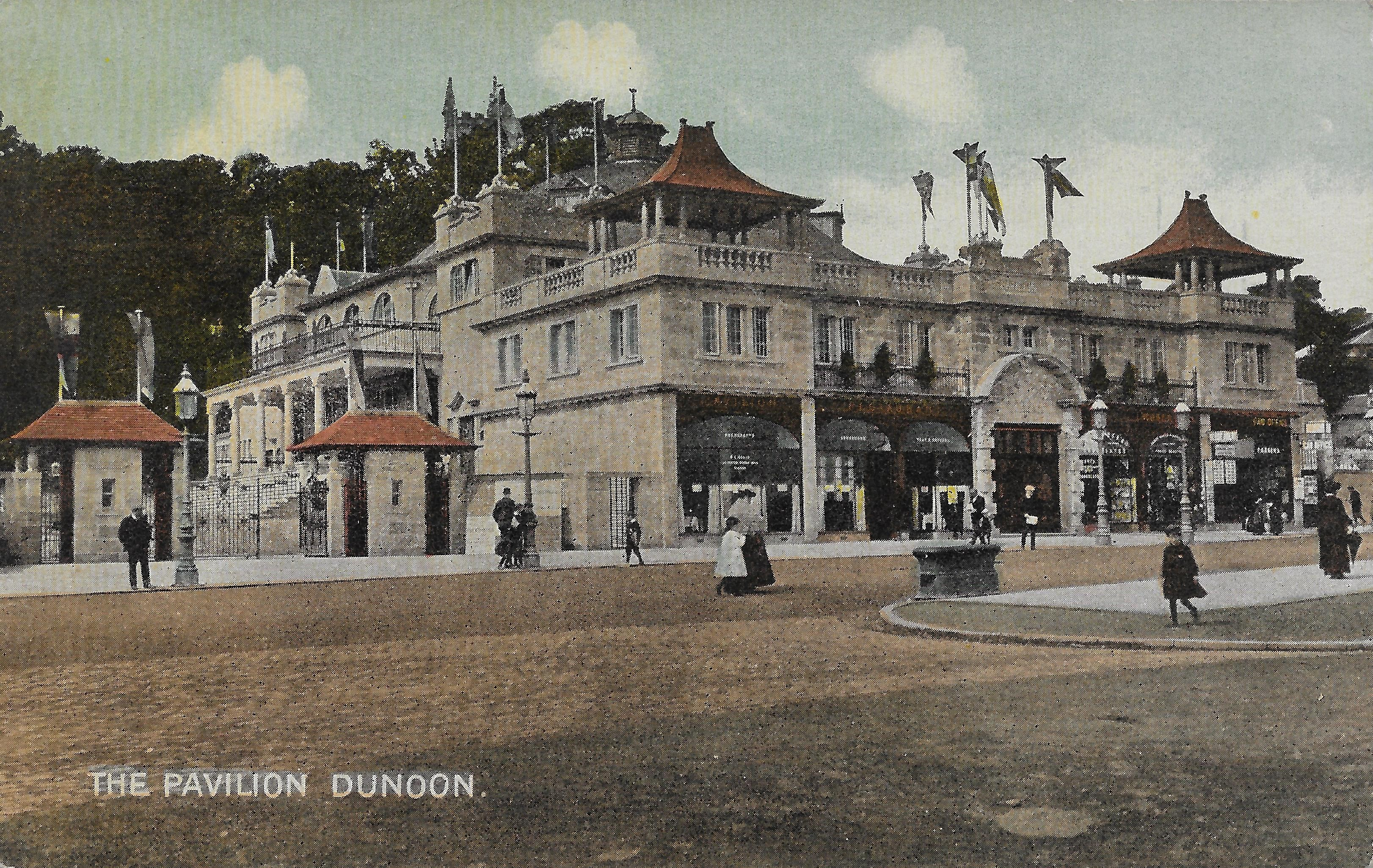
The Dunoon Pavilion, which opened in 1905, became a local landmark in the Scottish town.

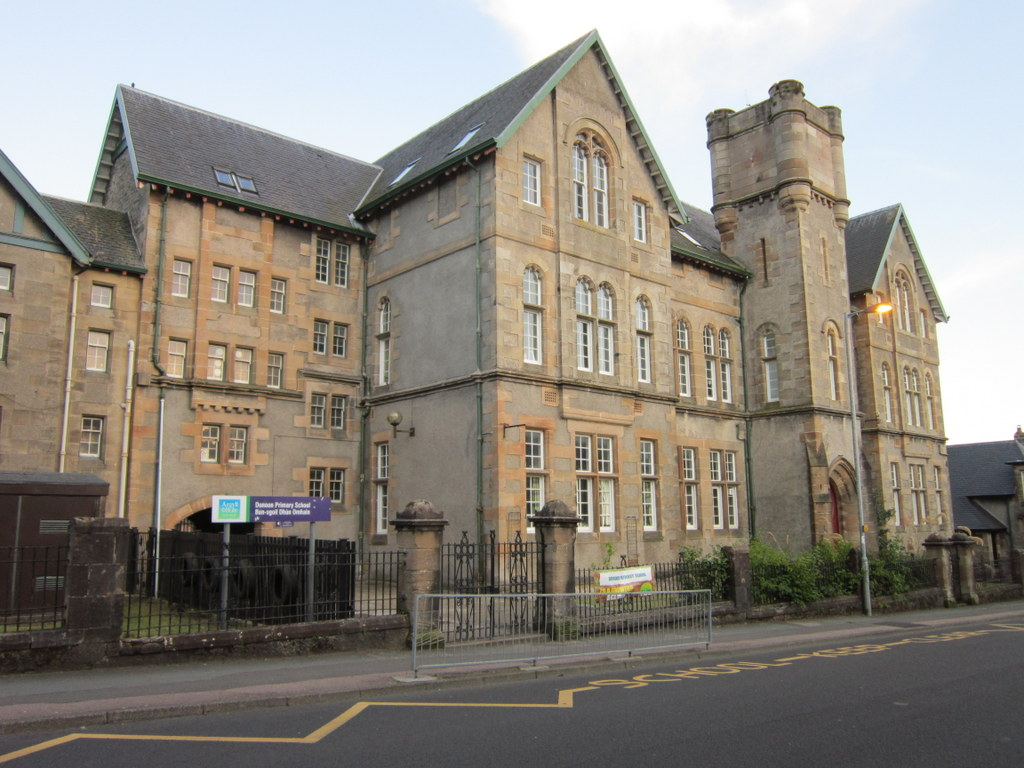
Fraser designed the Dunoon Primary School in 1899.

=== Scotland ===
From 1883 to 1888, Fraser apprenticed with the architecture firm of John McLeod in Glasgow. In 1889, Fraser moved to London, where he served as assistant to architect William Warlow Gwyther and in 1891 was elected as an Associate of the Royal Institute of British Architects (ARIBA).

Fraser won the competition to design the Burns Memorial and Cottage Homes in the town of Mauchline, East Ayrshire, to honour Scottish poet and lyricist Robert Burns, who rented Mossgiel Farm near Mauchline from 1784 to 1788, where he composed many of his best-known works. The foundation stone was laid in 1896. After winning the design competition, Fraser established his independent architecture practice.

The monument, also called the National Burns Memorial, features a tower designed in the Scottish Baronial architectural style and cottages that "were intended as a permanent living memorial to the poet symbolising his sympathy for the genuinely unfortunate." Today, the tower houses a contemporary art gallery, while the cottages continue to provide accommodation and facilities for elderly residents.

In 1897, a commemorative water fountain was erected in Lochgilphead, built to a design by Fraser, in memory of his older brother Alexander Rodger Fraser (1865–1894), who had served as a resident physician with the Bengal Collieries of the British East India Company in Bengal, India, and who died at the Red Sea while travelling home.

In 1898, Fraser settled in the town of Dunoon, Argyll, where he was commissioned to design several public buildings, including the Dunoon Grammar School (now the Dunoon Primary School and a Category B listed building); and the Dunoon Public Pavilion, which was officially opened on 17 August 1905 by Princess Louise, Duchess of Argyll, and her husband John Campbell, 9th Duke of Argyll. The Pavilion, which included a multi-purpose public meeting and concert hall, a restaurant and shops, was destroyed by fire in 1949. Today's Queen's Hall stands on the site.

=== Canada ===
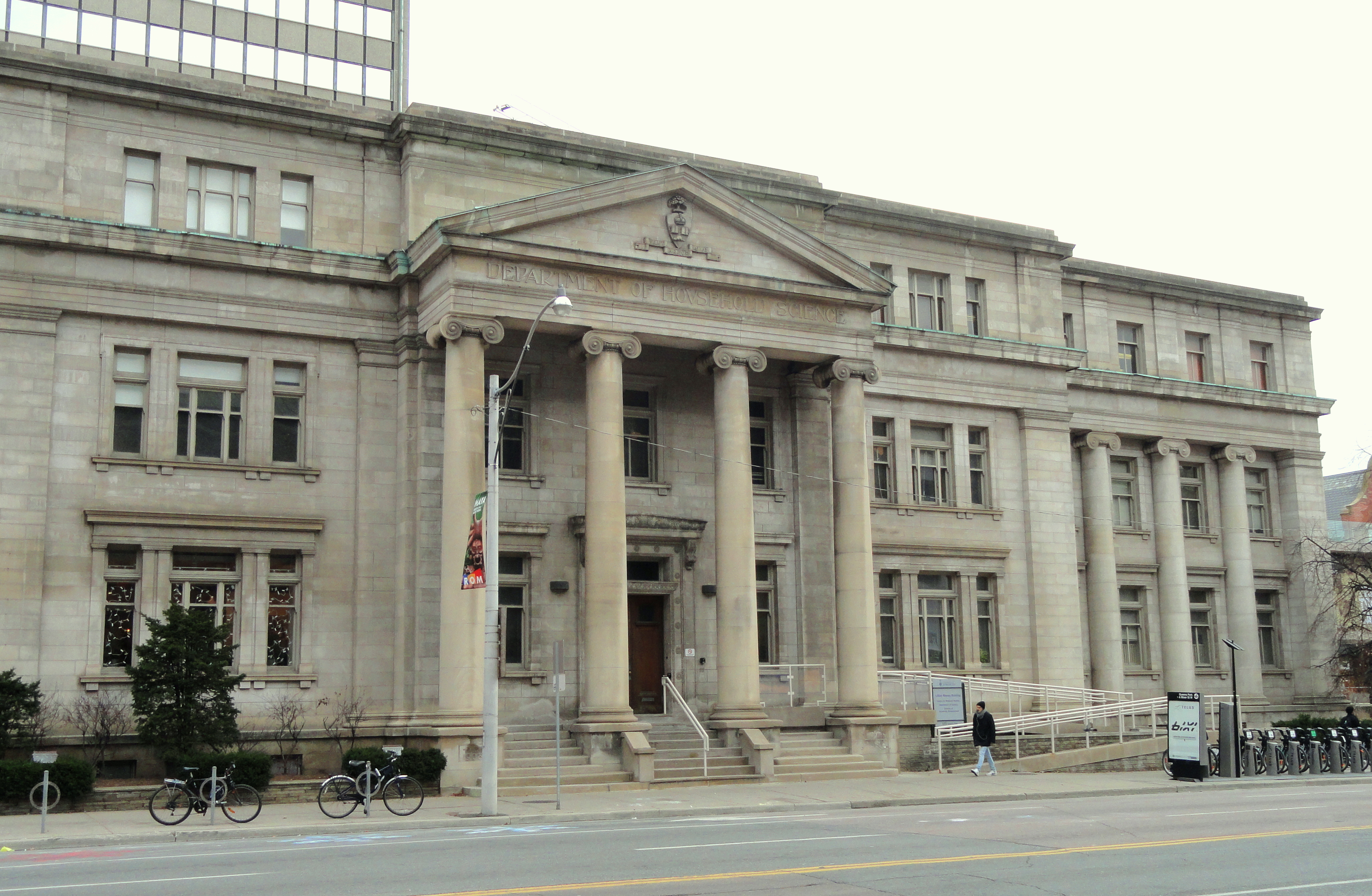
Fraser is credited with the design of the Lillian Massey Building, which was built between 1908 and 1912 for the University of Toronto's Household Science program.

In 1907, Fraser and his family emigrated to Toronto, Canada, where he became part of George M.'s architecture firm. Miller as an associate and worked on projects for the influential Massey family and "where he was credited with the design of the Deaconess' Home, St. Clair Avenue West (1908–09) and the refined Beaux-Arts scheme for the School of Household Science", which is now called the Lillian Massey Building.

In 1911, Fraser established an independent architecture practice specialising in the design of educational buildings. One of his largest commissions was for the Anderson Building in downtown Toronto.

Fraser was contracted by the Government of Canada to provide architectural services for the rebuilding of Halifax, Nova Scotia, after the Halifax Explosion devastated the city on 6 December 1917, when the French munitions ship SS Mont-Blanc exploded in Halifax harbor, killing approximately 2,000 people.

Fraser worked for two years in Halifax, where he designed two public schools and a Bank of Nova Scotia building, but while there, he fell ill from cancer and had to return to Toronto in 1921. He died on 14 June 1922, aged 54.

== Personal life ==
Fraser married Maud Marion Timpson in Dunoon in 1898, and they initially settled in the town. They had three children. Fraser's widow survived him by 45 years; she died in 1967, aged 92.

== Selected works and historical photographs ==
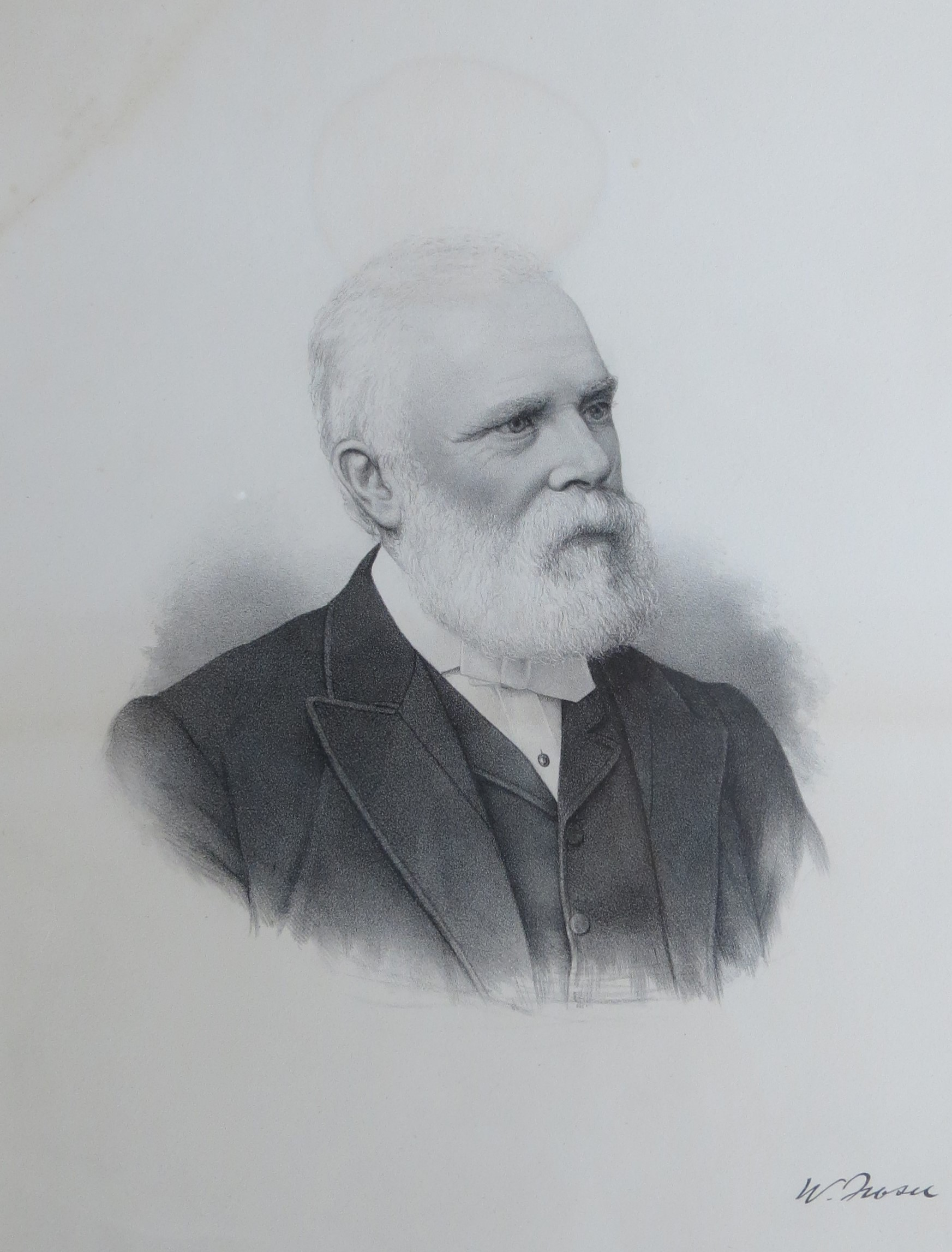
Steel engraving by William Fraser, ARIBA, dated about 1890 of his father, The Reverend William Fraser, who served as minister of the Free Church of Scotland in Lochgilphead, Scotland, from December 1861 to June 1892. Private Collection.

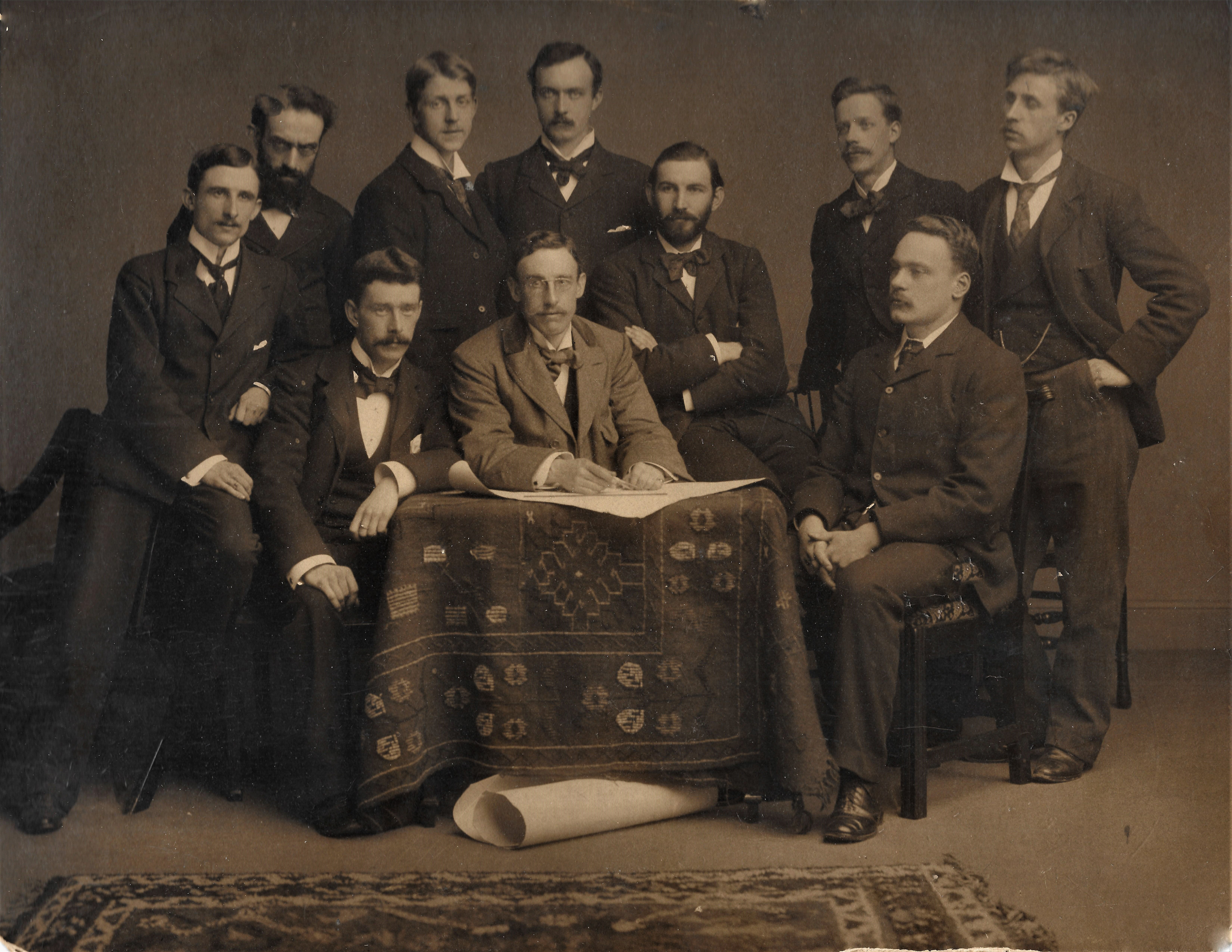
A circa 1890 group portrait of Scottish architects, including William Fraser, ARIBA, standing, center. Private Collection.

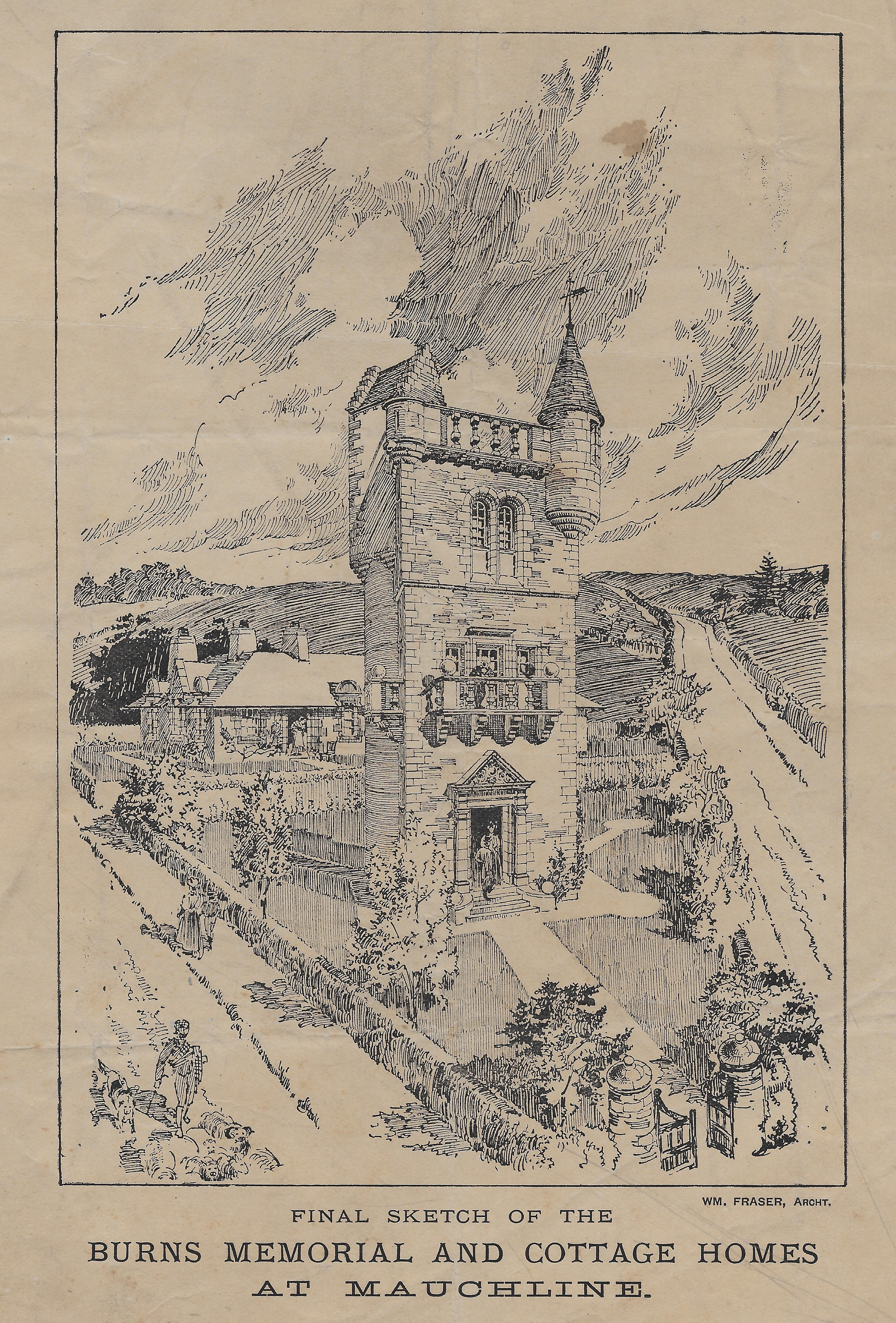
Burns Memorial and Cottage Homes in Mauchline, Scotland; final sketch by Scottish architect William Fraser, ARIBA. Private Collection.

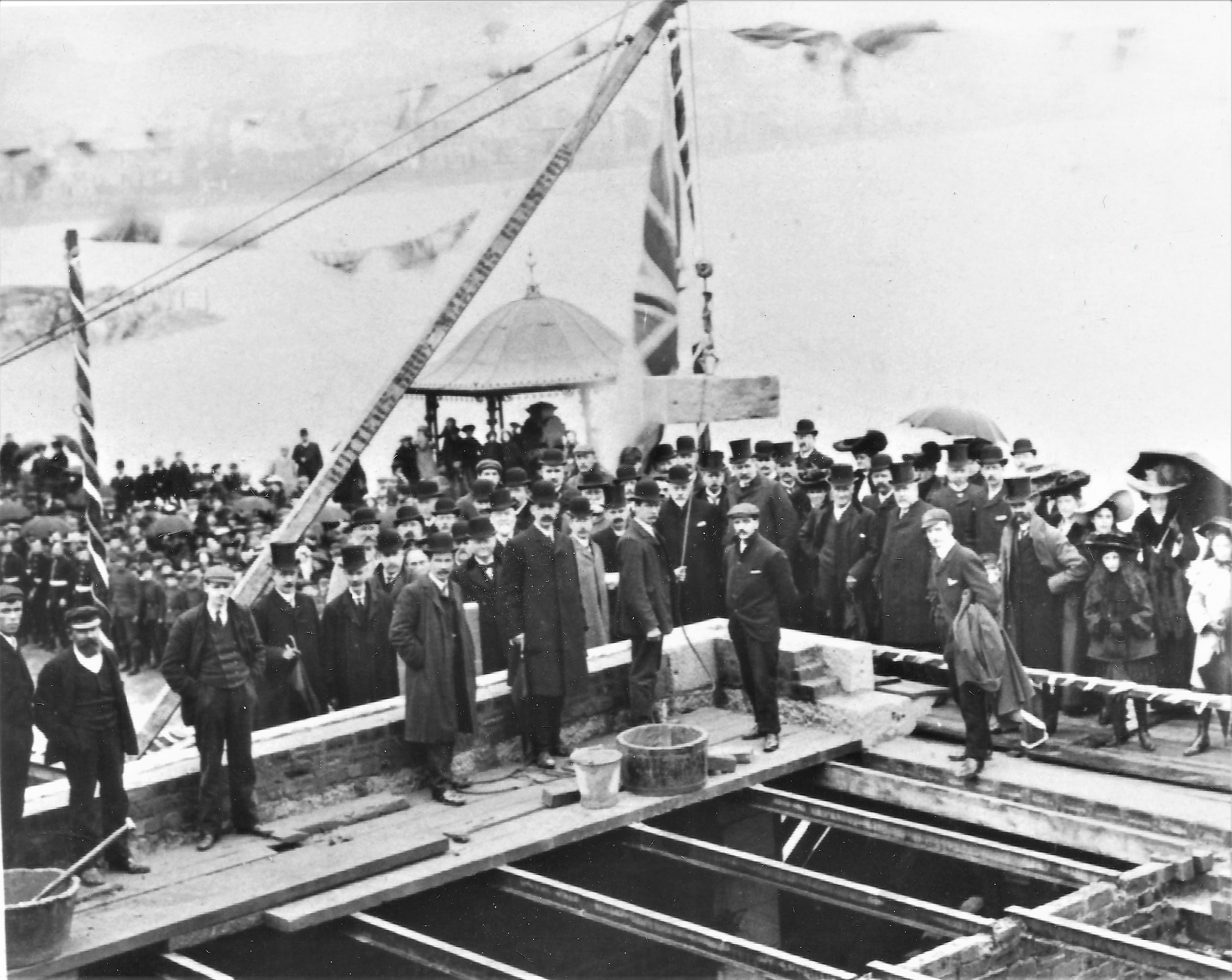
This 1904 photograph pictures the official laying of the cornerstone in Dunoon, Scotland, of the Dunoon Pavilion, which was designed by Scottish architect William Fraser, ARIBA, who is pictured first on the left wearing a top hat. Private Collection.

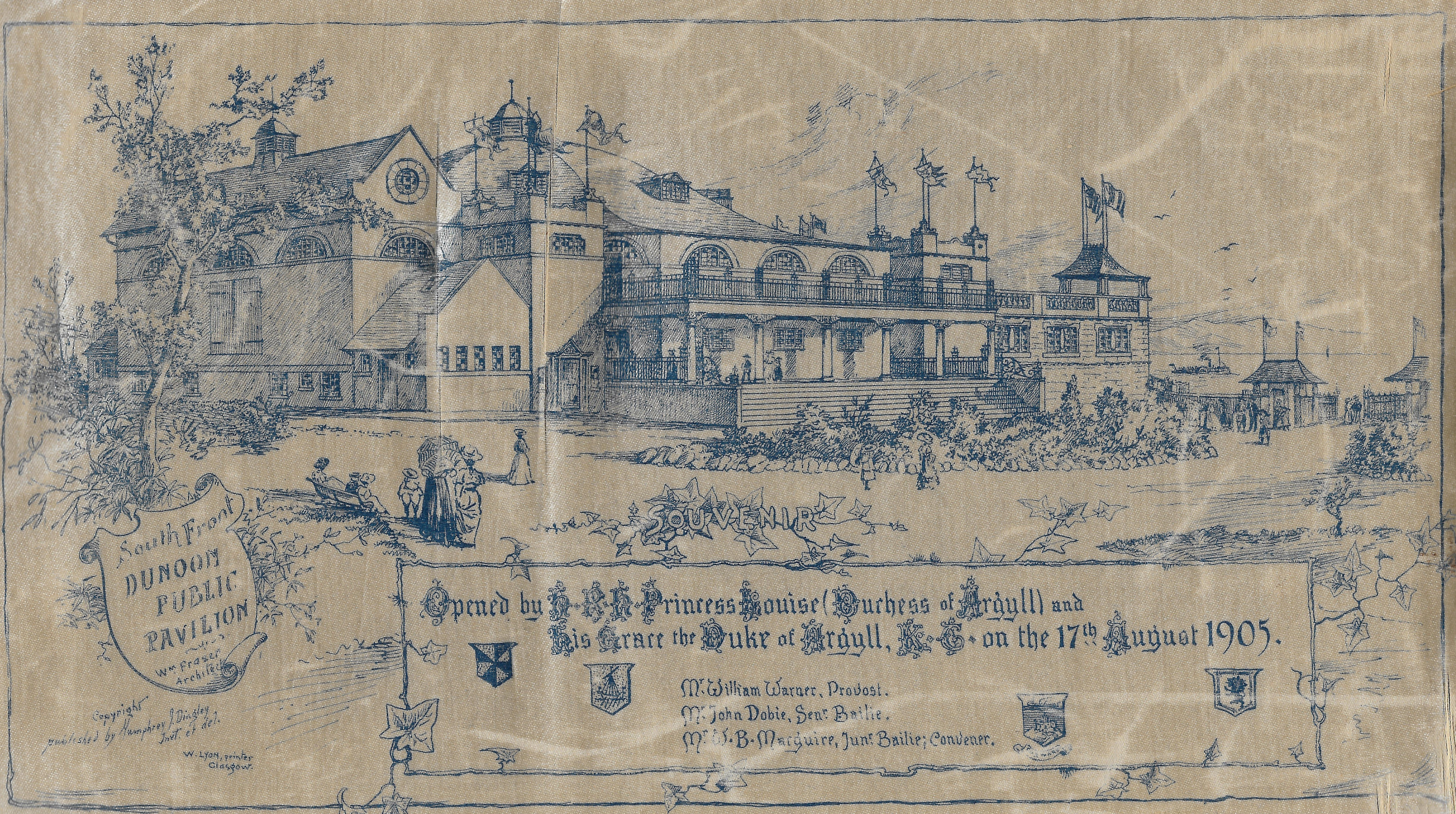
Souvenir printed on silk marking the official opening on 17 August 1905 in Dunoon, Scotland, of the Dunoon Public Pavilion; architectural rendering and souvenir artwork by the Pavilion's designer William Fraser, ARIBA. Private Collection.
