= Dunoon Pier =

Victorian pier in Dunoon, Scotland

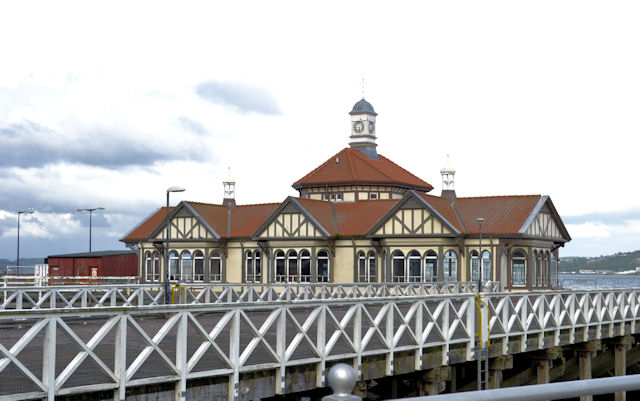
- Dunoon Pier in 2011
- Type: Historical Pier
- Spans: Firth of Clyde
- Location: Dunoon, Cowal, Scotland
- Coordinates: 55.946658°N 4.921629°W
- Owner: Argyll and Bute Council

Characteristics
- Construction: Greenheart timber (piles)

History
- Designer: Clarke & Bell; Sir William Copland; Robert Alexander Bryden; C. J. M. Mackintosh
- Opening date: 1898 (128 years ago)

Dunoon Pier is a Victorian pier in Dunoon, Argyll and Bute, Scotland. It is owned by Argyll and Bute Council, and was completed in its current form in 1898. Reaching out into the Firth of Clyde, the earliest parts of the pier date to 1835. It is now a Category A listed structure (upgraded from Category B in 2011) and, according to Historic Environment Scotland, the best surviving example of a timber ferry pier in Scotland.

The pier is constructed of Greenheart timber piles, first built in 1835. A more substantial structure followed in 1841 after tourism to the town had increased. This second incarnation was destroyed in a storm three years later. It was rebuilt the following year and extended in 1867 by Campbell Douglas.

The pier was purchased in 1868 by James Hunter, of Hafton House, and was "considerably enlarged, with every convenience for passenger and goods traffic". A ferry also ran from the pier to Cloch lighthouse at one stage.

The pier was extended to the current structure between 1896 and 1898, under authority of the Dunoon Burgh Pier Order 1895 and the Dunoon Burgh Pier Order 1896. It was shortened to allow the building of a breakwater in 2005, just to the south of the pier. As well as protecting the pier and its architecture from storm surges, a new link span was installed alongside the breakwater. This was to allow the berthing and loading of roll-on/roll-off ferries instead of the side-loading ferries that used to serve the pier. A tender to serve the new link-span between two interested parties, Caledonian MacBrayne and Western Ferries, came to nothing. Prior to June 2011, the pier was in daily use by Caledonian MacBrayne, who ran a regular foot passenger and car-ferry service to Gourock. However, after June 2011, a renewed tendering process produced a passenger-only ferry service (Argyll Ferries, owned by Caledonian MacBrayne) using the breakwater for berthing. On 1 September 2004, during the construction of the breakwater, the cargo vessel Jackie Moon (82 metres in length) ran aground on the breakwater, with six people on board. Since the breakwater became operational in June 2011, Argyll Ferries operate from this docking facility. The Waverley struck the breakwater on 26 June 2009, with some 700 people on board. The pier was partially refurbished by Argyll and Bute Council during 2015. Now containing meeting rooms, it is purely a tourist attraction.

== Gallery ==
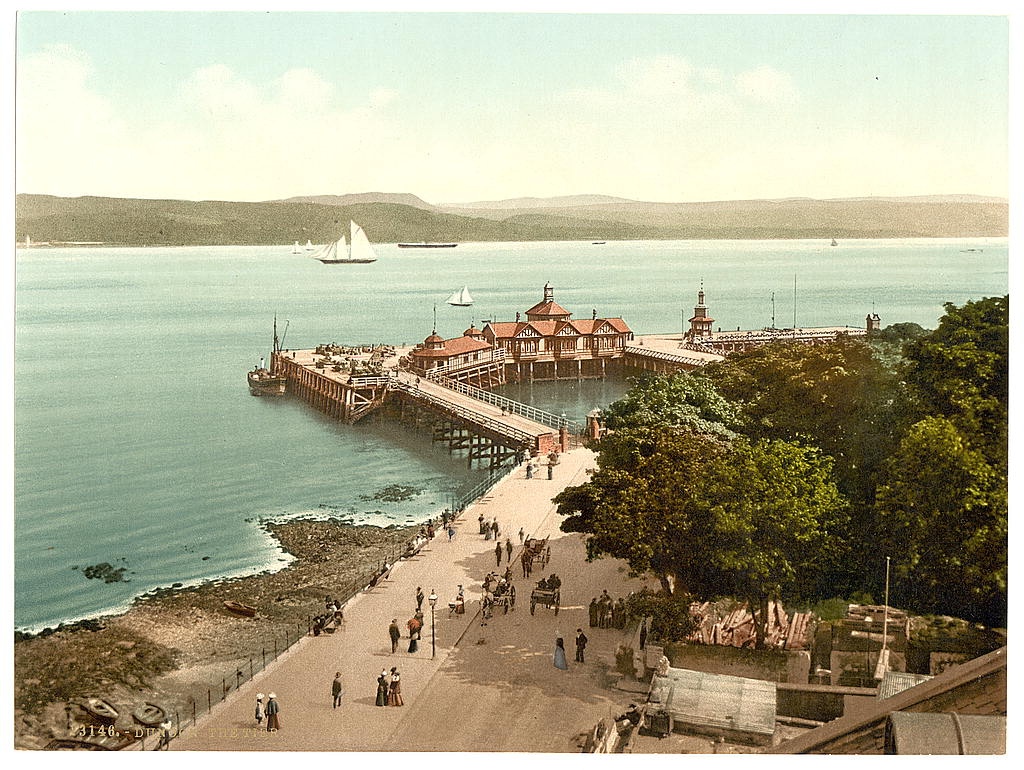
Around 1890, looking southeast

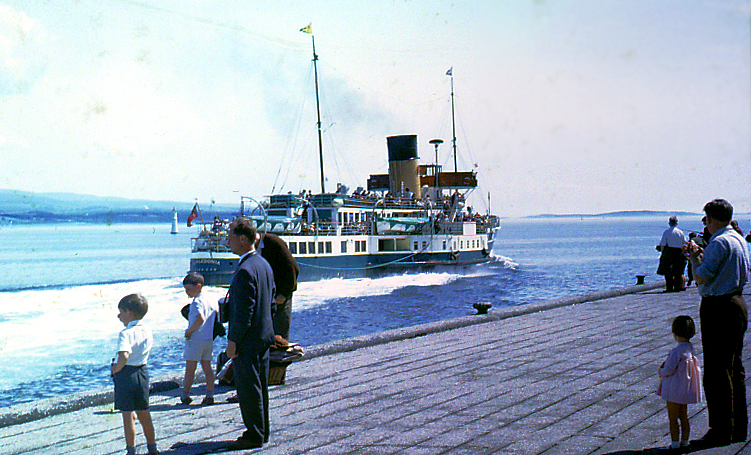
The steamboat Caledonia departing the pier in 1967

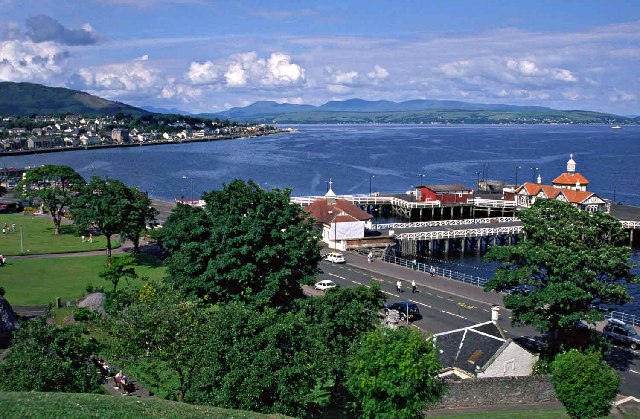
Looking north from Castle Hill, 1997

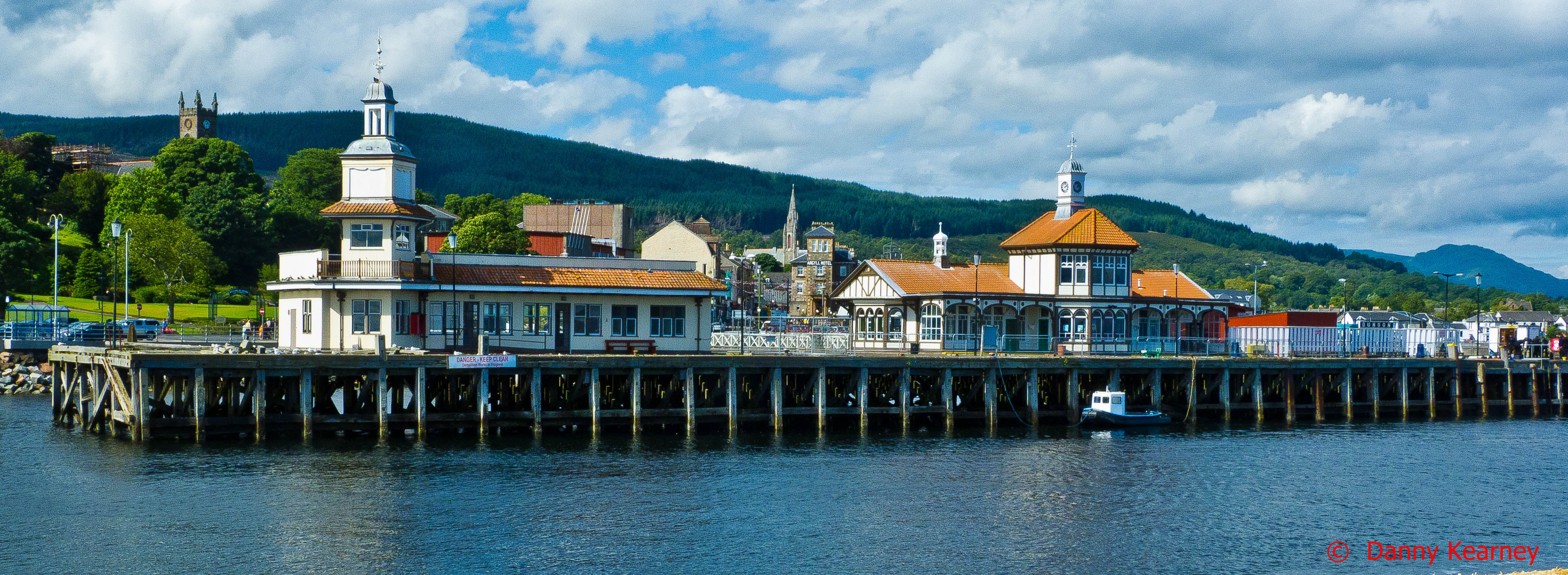
The eastern side of the pier

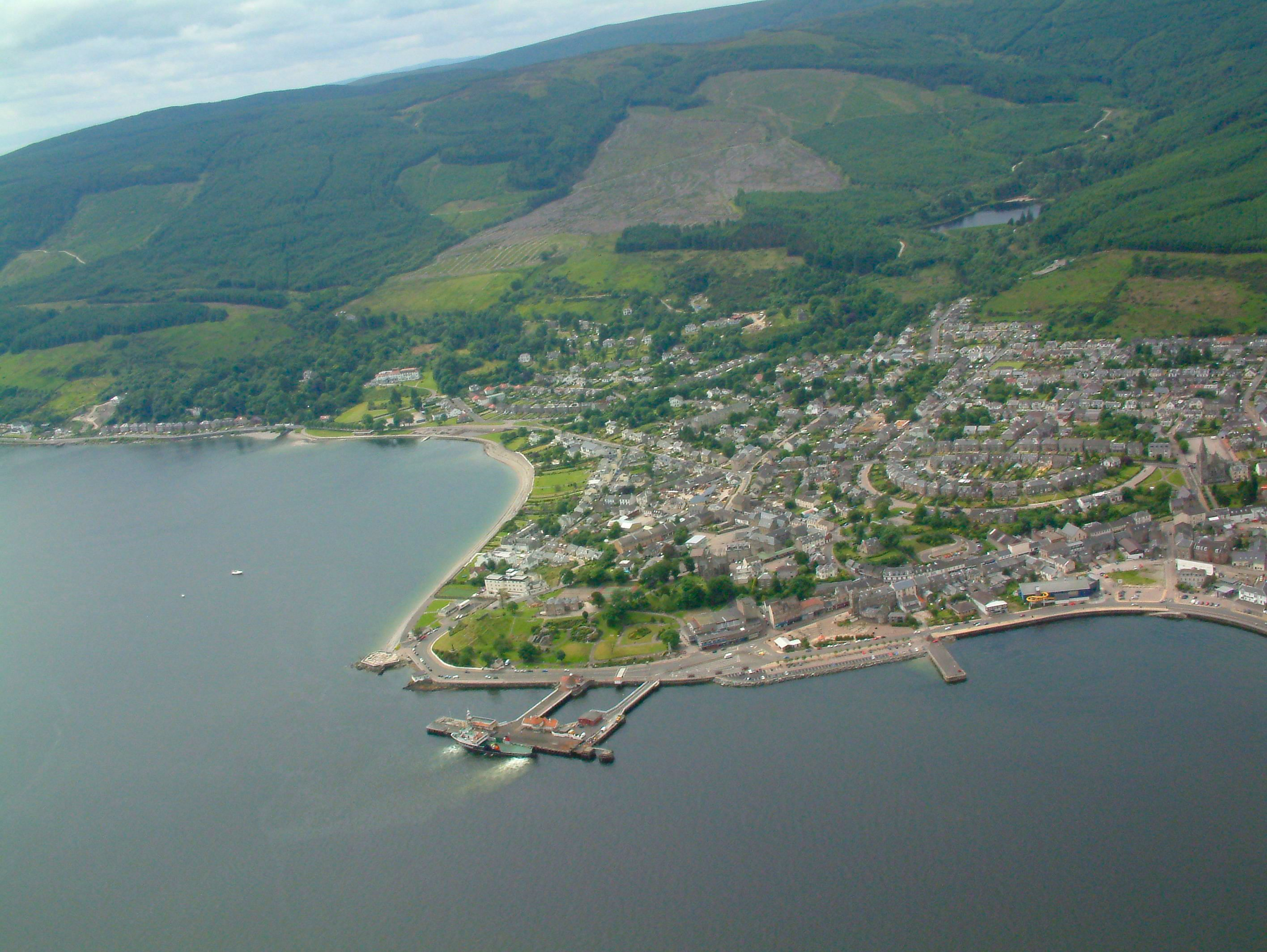
Aerial view, 2003

== See also ==
- List of piers in the United Kingdom
