= St John's Church, Dunoon =

St John's Church
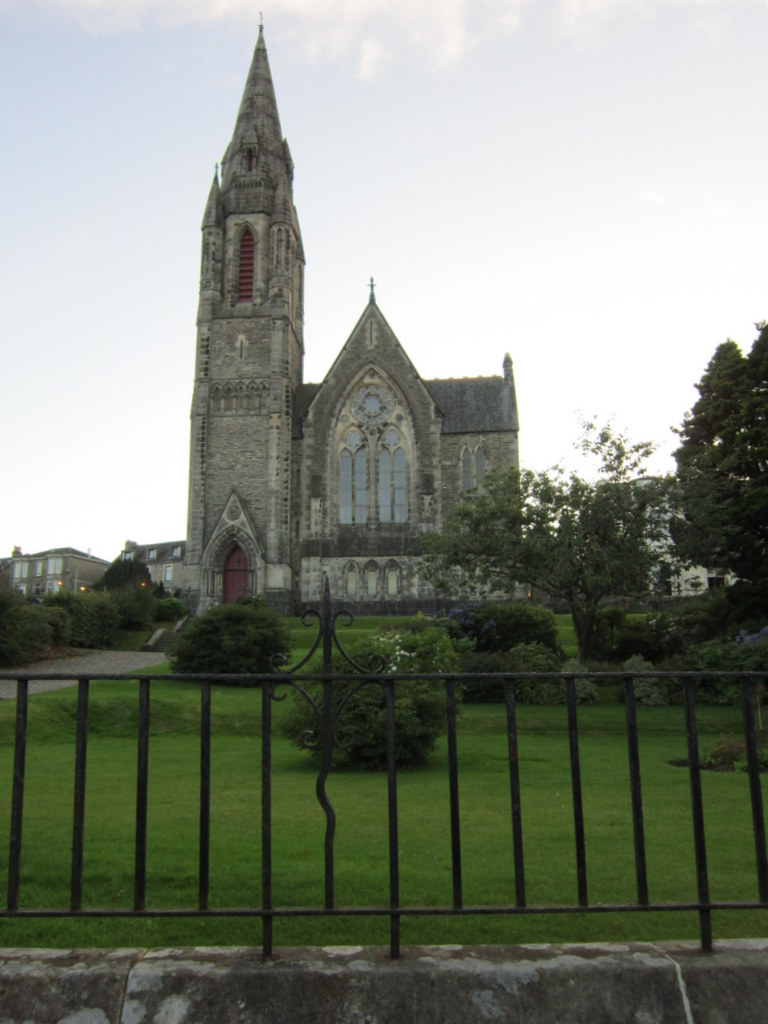
- Pictured in 2013
- St John's Church
- 55°57′02″N 4°55′44″W
- Location: Dunoon, Argyll and Bute
- Country: Scotland
- Denomination: Church of Scotland
- Website: Cowal Kirk Website

History
- Status: open

Architecture
- Functional status: used
- Heritage designation: Category A listed building
- Designated: 20 July 1971
- Architect: Robert Alexander Bryden
- Architectural type: Normandy Gothic
- Years built: 1877

St John's Church, formerly Dunoon Free Church, is a Presbyterian church building in Dunoon, Argyll and Bute, Scotland. A Category A listed structure, it is located in the town centre at the junction between Hanover Street and Victoria Road. The church is still in daily use.

== History ==
The Very Reverend Mackintosh MacKay's 27 February 1840 Address to the Parishioners of Dunoon and Kilmun, given from the Manse in Dunoon, was published later that year. An 1842 addendum by MacKay was later included.

The current building was erected in 1843 on the site of an older church. Architect Robert Alexander Bryden was hired and the present church building was completed in 1877. (Bryden is buried about half a mile to the north of the church, in Dunoon Cemetery.)

Like the predecessor, it was initially called Dunoon Free Church and later renamed St John's Church.

== Description ==
St John's Church was built using dry stone masonry and stands on a steeply sloping site which increases its apparent size and the height of the tower and spire. The architecture is in the Normandy Gothic architecture style with crisply carved details. The interior is laid out with a horse-shoe shaped gallery for the congregation and a raised and raked gallery for the choir behind the central pulpit. There are many stained-glass windows throughout the building. The organ was installed in 1895 by Brook & Co. as a two-manual pipe organ and was subsequently enlarged to three manuals in 1921.

The church was refurbished in 2012 via a £200,000 grant from Historic Scotland and the Heritage Lottery Fund.

In 2026, hopes to keep services going at the church failed, and plans to put the building up for sale were announced.

== Gallery ==
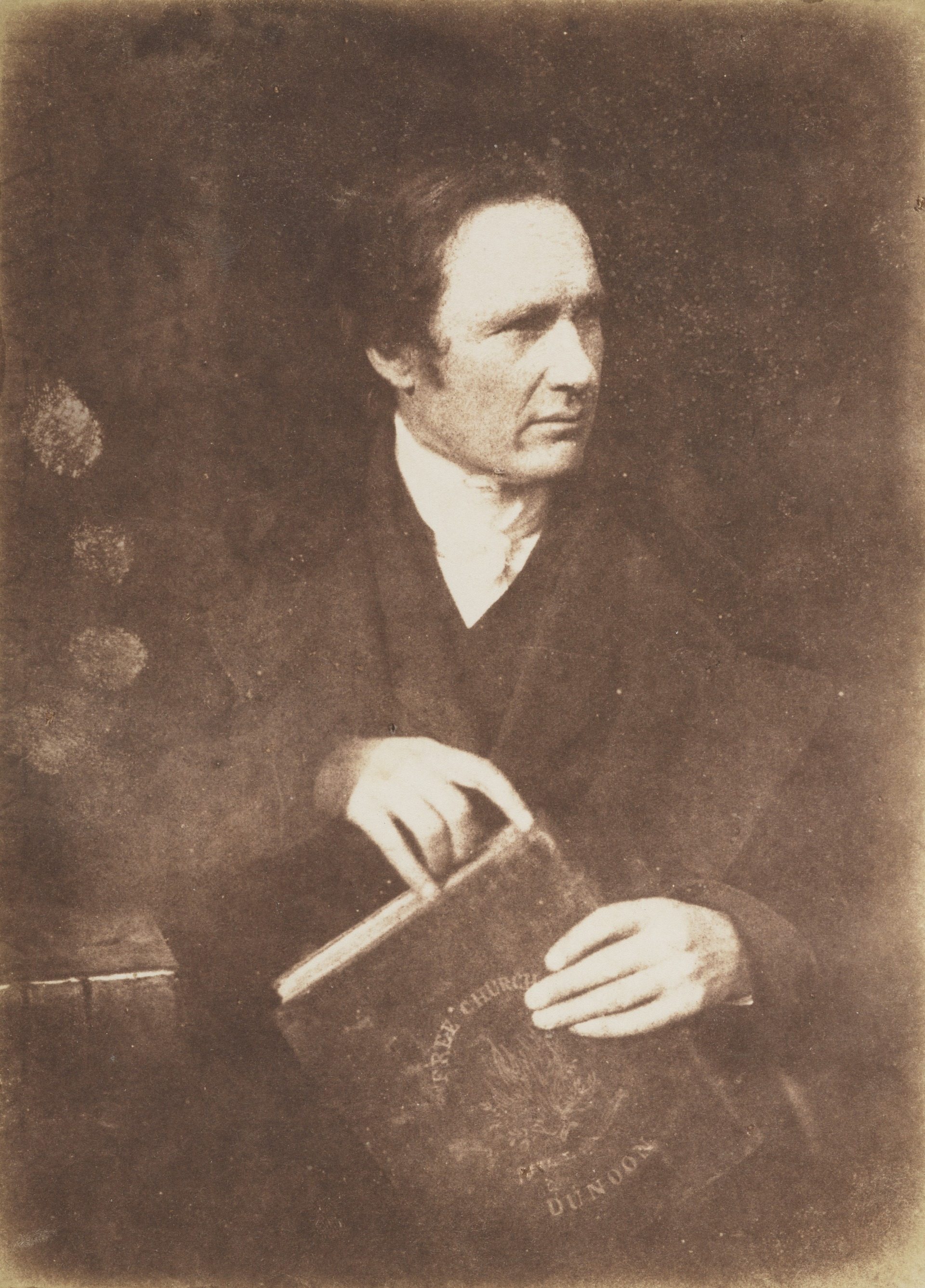
Rev. Dr Mackintosh MacKay (1800–1873). Of Dunoon, Melbourne and Sydney, Church of Scotland and Free Church minister, Gaelic scholar
