= Martin's Memorial Church, Stornoway =

Martin’s Memorial Church, Stornoway
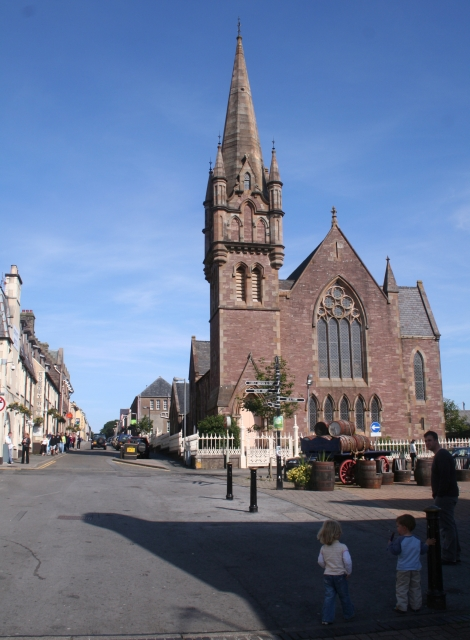
- Martin’s Memorial Church

- Location within Lewis
- 58°12′31″N 6°23′12″W
- Location: Stornoway
- Country: Scotland
- Denomination: Church of Scotland
- Previous denomination: United Free English
- Website: martinsmemorial.org.uk

History
- Status: Parish church

Architecture
- Functional status: Active
- Heritage designation: Category B listed building
- Designated: 25 November 1980
- Architect: Robert Alexander Bryden FRIBA
- Style: Early English Gothic
- Groundbreaking: 27 August 1877
- Completed: 18 October 1878

Specifications
- Capacity: 630 persons
- Length: 70 feet (21 m)
- Width: 50 feet (15 m)

Administration
- Parish: Stornoway Martin’s Memorial

Martin’s Memorial Church is a Category B listed building in Stornoway, Isle of Lewis.

== History ==
The congregation of Martin's Memorial originates in the Disruption of 1843, when a substantial number of Church of Scotland members left to form the Free Church of Scotland.

In response to those who adhered to the Free Church in Stornoway, a congregation was formed in 1844. A church was soon built. It burned down in 1850 and then rebuilt. Today, this building is Stornoway: St Columba's Church of Scotland.

In 1874 a petition, signed by 202 people, asked the Free Church's Presbytery of Lewis to form a second charge in Stornoway, which should be English speaking, rather than purely Gaelic. There was a large population in the wider area, many of whom could speak English. This number was boosted by the great influx of English-speaking people at fishing seasons. The charge was sanctioned by the General Assembly in 1876. The congregation purchased the site for the church at a cost of £250 (equivalent to £24,900 in 2025) at the corner of Francis Street and Kenneth Street.

The foundation stone was laid on 27 August 1877 by Dr. Adam of Glasgow. It was constructed from red Torridon Sandstone with white stone dressings. Designed by the architect Robert Alexander Bryden of Glasgow it was constructed mainly by local contractors. The mason, plumber and painter works were carried out by local tradesmen, the wright-work by John Baxter of Glasgow, the plasterwork by A.W. Paterson of Dunoon, and the glazier work by C&J Malloch of Glasgow. The baptismal font was presented by the architect. The building was opened for worship on Friday 18 October 1878.

The spire was added in February 1911 at a cost of £1,189 (equivalent to £121,100 in 2025) to the designs of the architect Alex Macdonald.

In 1913 the congregation of the James Street United Presbyterian Church united with the Free English Church, and its building and manse were sold, with the proceeds of the sale passing to the latter, renamed as the United Free English Church.

In 1929, the congregation unanimously voted for the adoption of a new name for the United Free English Congregation, which then became Martin’s Memorial Church. The name was in honour of the first minister, Donald John Martin, which was his first charge. He served from 9 February 1876 until 30 April 1897.

== Organ ==
The current Harrison Pipe Organ, purchased at a cost of £2,600 (equivalent to £79,400 in 2025) and opened on 20 November 1949.

== Ministry ==
- 1876-79 Donald John Martin
- 1879-1901 John Somerled MacDonald
- 1902-06 Alexander Murray
- 1907-1913 Alexander Matheson McIver
- 1913-1920 George Alexander Mills
- 1921-24 Alexander White
- 1924-27 Donald John MacInnes
- 1928-31 Robert Inglis
- 1932-34 Thomas Mackenzie Donn
- 1936-45 Ian Carmichael
- 1946-49 John Macdonald Skinner
- 1950-60 - John Robert Kilburn De Lingen
- 1961-64 Donald Gillies
- 1965-75 Colin Ian Maclean
- 1976 - 2004 Thomas Suter Sinclair
- 2006 - present Thomas McNeil
