= Western Baths =

Private members leisure club in Glasgow, Scotland

Coordinates: 55°52′36.21″N 4°17′26.85″W

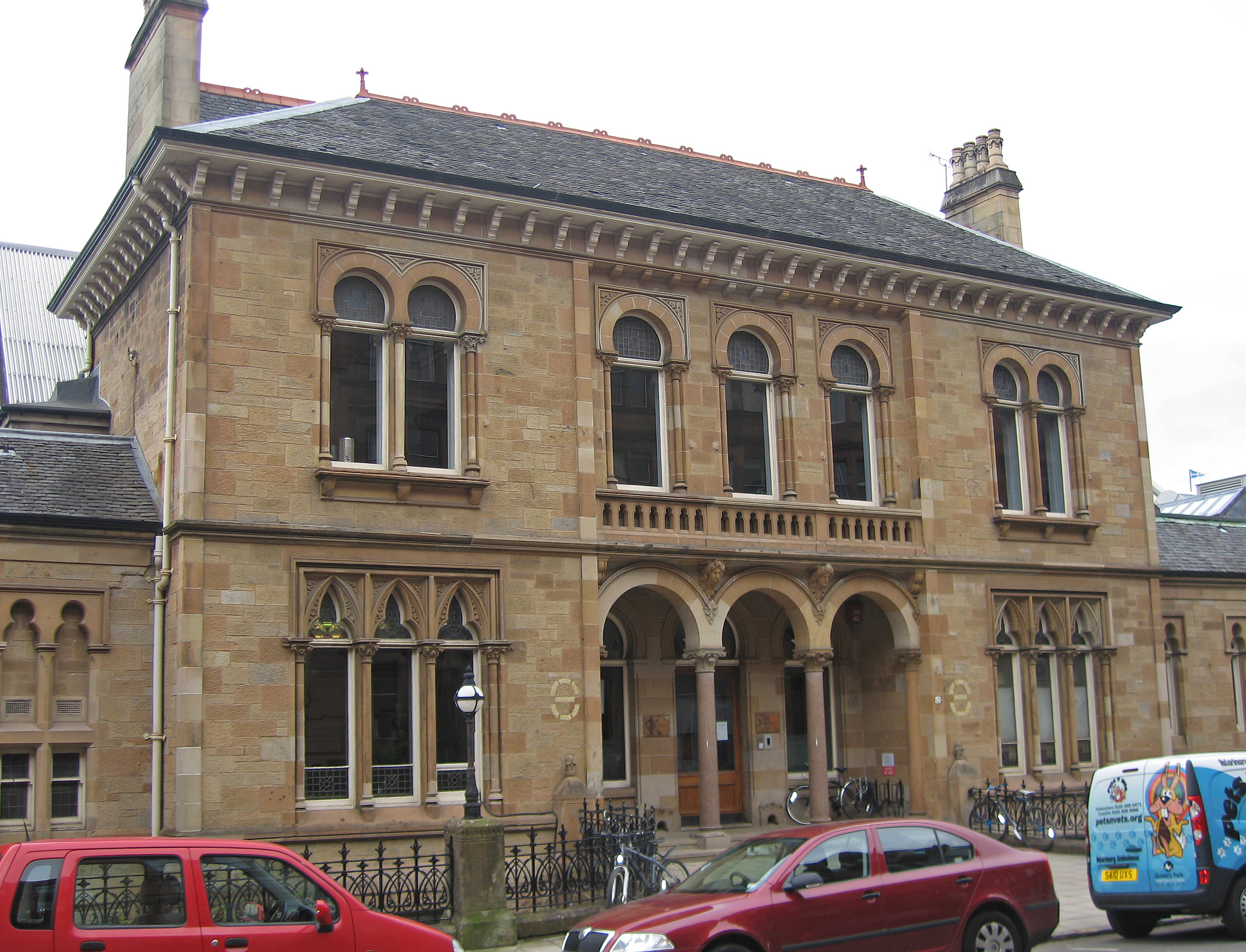
Shows the setting of the club.

The Western Baths Club "the Baths" is a Victorian-era private swimming and leisure club founded in 1876. The Club remains at its original site at 12 Cranworth Street, Hillhead, Glasgow. The 19th-century Baths, designed by Glasgow Architects Clarke & Bell are protected as a "Category A listed building", within a designated conservation area and along with the Arlington Baths Club, it is one of two Victorian Pools of its kind left in Glasgow.

Some years ago the Club acquired adjacent ground to the West and erected a new building to house a modern Sports Hall and Gym thereby further extending and enhancing the Club's facilities.

The Baths are distinctive for their period trapeze and exercise rings over the swimming pool, and its Victorian Turkish bath is one of only three remaining in Scotland. The Baths are also a founding and current member of the Historic Pools of Britain, being one of eleven Victorian Pools remaining in the UK.

The 'Baths' as they are more commonly known have survived mixed fortunes over their lengthy existence having at one point closed and lay almost derelict however was successfully reopened. A similar fate nearly closed the Baths in the 1970s "the day the roof fell in". The Victorian slated roof over the swimming pool partially collapsed and with the Cochrane oil-fired boiler rarely working the Club was trading at a loss and the membership dwindling. The then Secretary William M. Mann CBE worked to secure funding support to ensure the Club's survival.

The position of Bathsmaster was simply the role of Manager in Victorian times but the title referred to those of Victorian swimming pools/clubs. In its long life, there were five post-holders, Campbell, Jamieson, Wilson, McKellar, and Anderson.

The Baths continue to have a Manager, but the term has changed to General Manager (a title previously held by Mr Campbell, who was promoted to General Manager (and for a brief period in the 1980s Mr McKellar) who had overall control of all aspects of the club. The current position of General Manager within the Club is occupied by Ms Kathleen McCurry who stepped up from the position of Depute General Manager in March 2022

In 2026, The Western Baths Club will celebrate the 150th year anniversary of its founding.

Changed days since Alison F Blood wrote in her 1929 book Kelvinside Days that there were other baths in Glasgow, but the Western Baths were simply known as 'the Baths' and no one would have thought otherwise.

== Primary bibliography ==
- Mann, W M. [1991], 1876 The baths: the story of the Western Baths, Hillhead, from 1876 to 1990, (Glasgow: Western Baths Club)
- Shifrin, Malcolm (2015), Victorian Turkish baths, Swindon: Historic England, pp.231-234
