= Charles Cameron Memorial Fountain =

Drinking fountain in Glasgow, Scotland

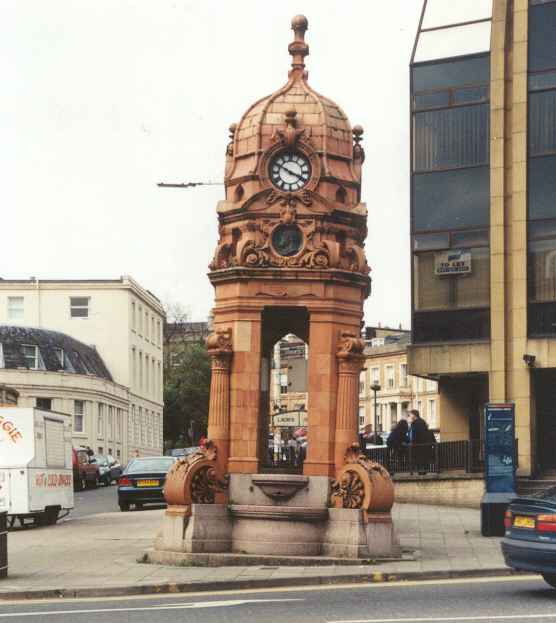
- The fountain in 2004, looking north down Woodside Crescent

- Location within Glasgow council area Location within Scotland

General information
- Type: Drinking fountain
- Architectural style: Baroque
- Location: Sauchiehall Street, Glasgow, Scotland
- Coordinates: 55.866419°N 4.272075°W
- Completed: 1896 (130 years ago)

Technical details
- Material: Peterhead granite (basin and base), Doultonware (upper stages)

Design and construction
- Architect: Robert Alexander Bryden

Listed Building – Category B
- Official name: Woodside Crescent/Sauchiehall Street, Cameron Memorial Fountain
- Designated: 20 May 1986
- Reference no.: LB32269

The Charles Cameron Memorial Fountain is a statue ensemble and drinking fountain in Glasgow, Scotland. Dating to 1896 and standing at the junction of Woodside Crescent and Sauchiehall Street, it is a Category B listed structure.

The fountain, designed by Clarke & Bell, is dedicated to Sir Charles Cameron MP. It is an ogee-domed baldacchino with basins at its base. It is in three stages, with a Peterhead granite base and basin and Doultonware for the two upper stages.

Although it no longer provides drinking water, the fountain has become notable for its pronounced eastward lean, which was first noted in 1926. An urban myth existed that the lean was caused by the construction of the M8 motorway in Glasgow.

Robert Alexander Bryden designed the clocktower dome, which has clock faces at the cardinal points and bronze portrait medallions of Cameron around its hexagonal shape.

== Gallery ==
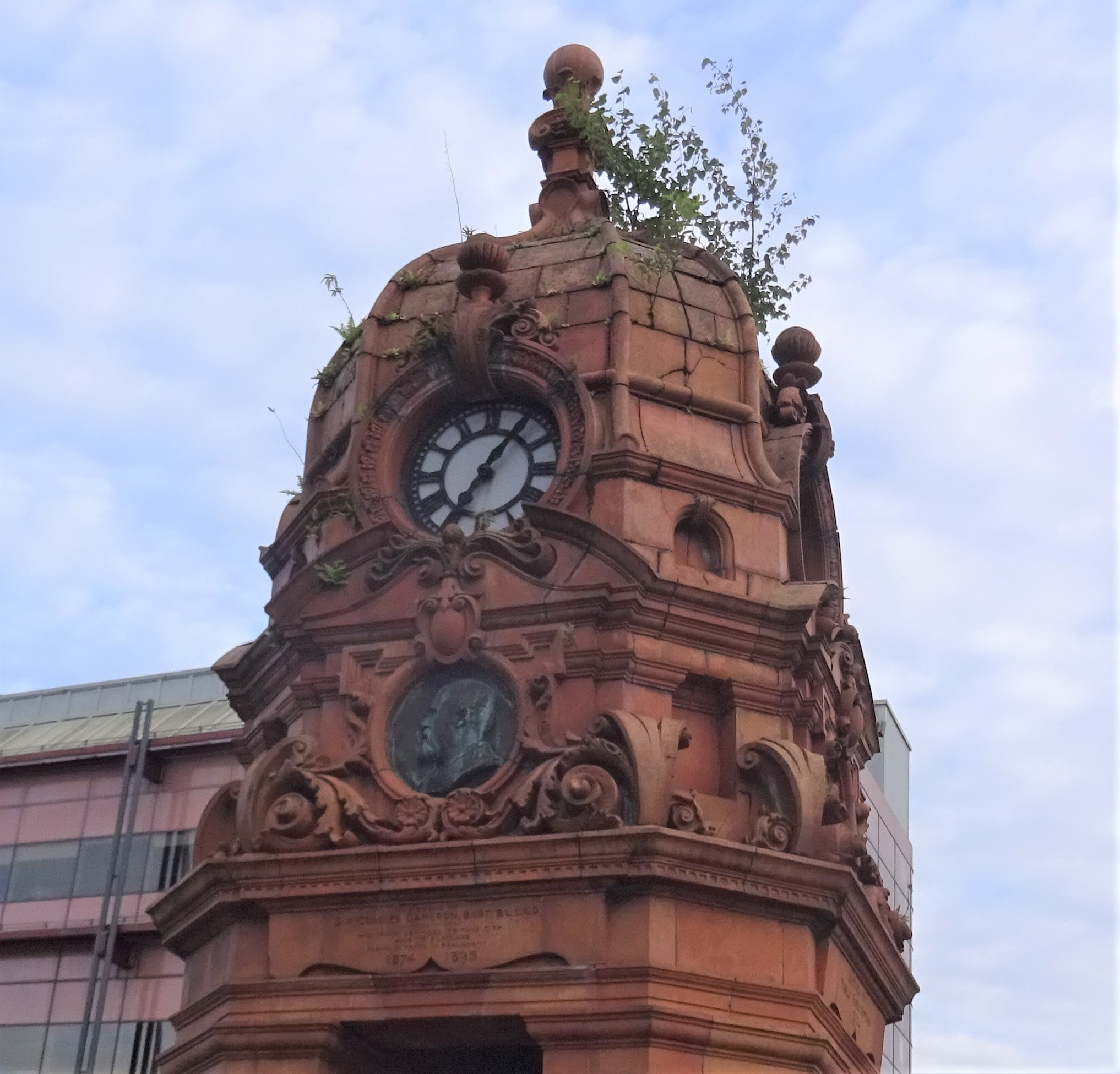
Dome detail

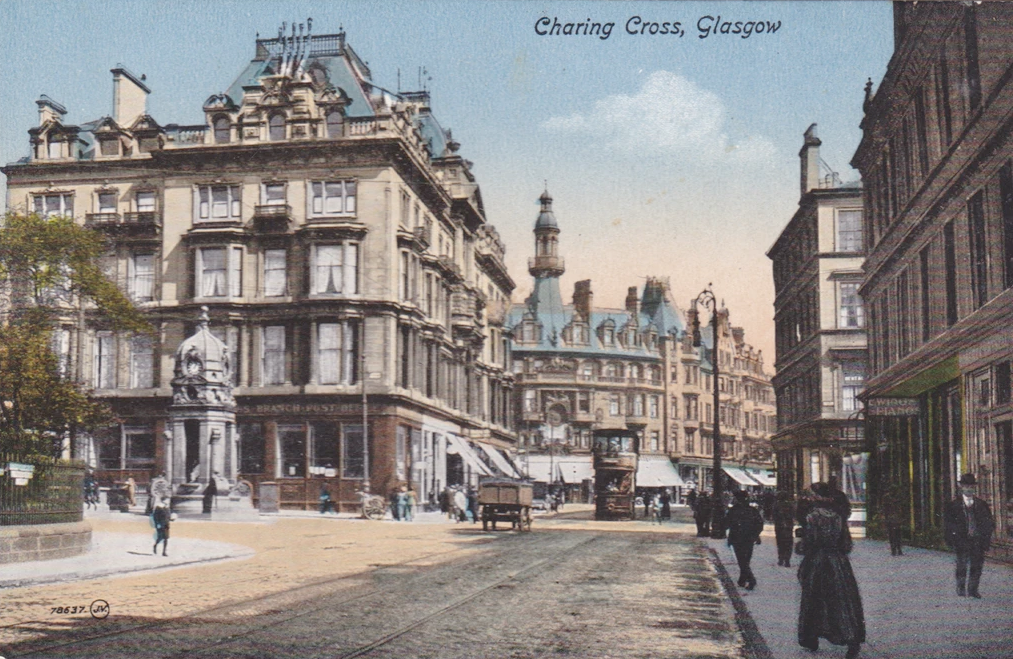
A c. 1900 view of the Charing Cross area, looking east along Sauchiehall Street

== See also ==
- List of public art in Glasgow
