= Joseph Brook and Co. =

Joseph Brook and Co. was the earliest organ maker in Scotland, in business from the early 19th century.

== Notable works ==
Brook and Co. installed organs in the following buildings:

- Dunoon Free Church, Dunoon, Scotland (1895)
