= Dunoon Cemetery =

Cemetery in Dunoon, Scotland

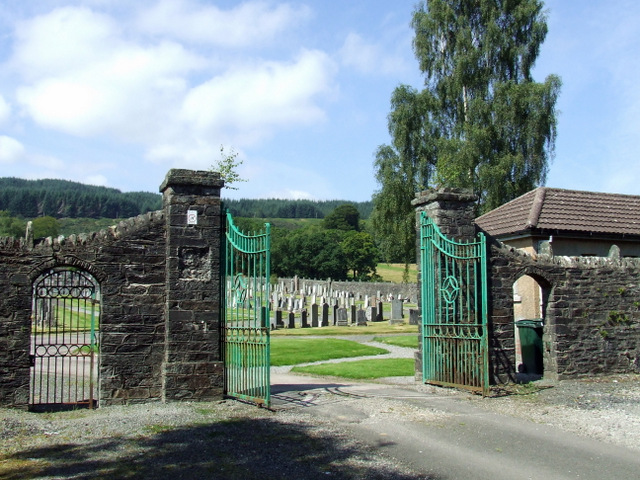
- The Bogleha' Road entrance, pictured in 2012
- Interactive map of Dunoon Cemetery

Details
- Established: 1857 (169 years ago)
- Location: Hamilton Street, Dunoon
- Country: Scotland
- Coordinates: 55.956466°N 4.931882°W
- Owned by: Argyll and Bute Council
- Find a Grave: Dunoon Cemetery

Dunoon Cemetery is a cemetery in Dunoon, Scotland. It is accessed either by Hamilton Road or by Bogleha' Road. The original section of the cemetery is 1.78 acres (0.72 ha), while its extension is 1.57 acres (0.64 ha).

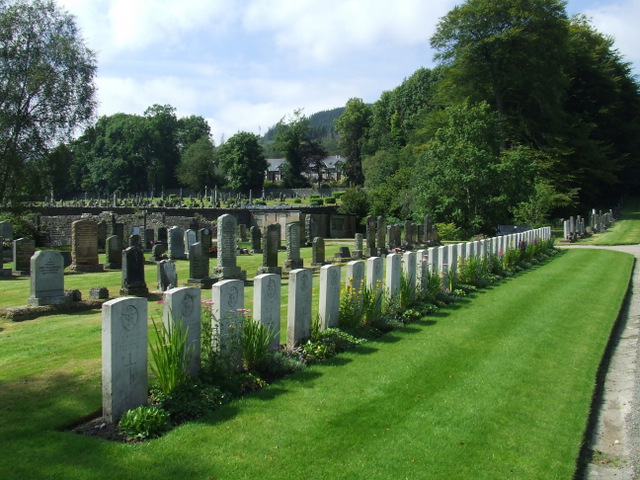
The 35 graves of the crew of HMS Untamed

As of 2003, the cemetery, which is owned by Argyll and Bute Council, contained 3,546 gravestones, with the earliest dating to 1857.

On 30 May 1943, HMS Untamed sank during a training exercise in the Firth of Clyde with the loss of all 35 of her crew. All of the dead, including 23-year-old lieutenant John Priestly Duncan, were buried in Dunoon Cemetery, while the war memorial in nearby Sandbank is partly dedicated to them.

== Notable interments ==
- Robert Alexander Bryden (1841–1906), architect
- Robert Buchanan (1785–1873), playwright
