= St Cuthbert's Church, Dunoon =

St Cuthbert's Church
- St Cuthbert's Church
- 55°57′01″N 4°55′39″W
- Location: Dunoon, Argyll and Bute
- Country: Scotland

History
- Former name: United Presbyterian Church
- Status: Demolished

Architecture
- Architect: Robert Alexander Bryden
- Years built: 1874
- Demolished: 1994 (32 years ago)

St Cuthbert's Church (formerly the United Presbyterian Church) was a church building in the Scottish town of Dunoon, Argyll and Bute, Scotland. It was built in 1874, to a design by noted architect Robert Alexander Bryden, who also designed the adjacent Dunoon Burgh Hall around the same time. The church stood for 120 years, before being demolished in 1994. A block of flats, erected in 2016, now stands on the site at 191 Argyll Street, at the head of Church Street. A planning application was first made for a similar construction in 1998.
