= Dunoon Burgh Hall =

Municipal Building in Dunoon, Scotland

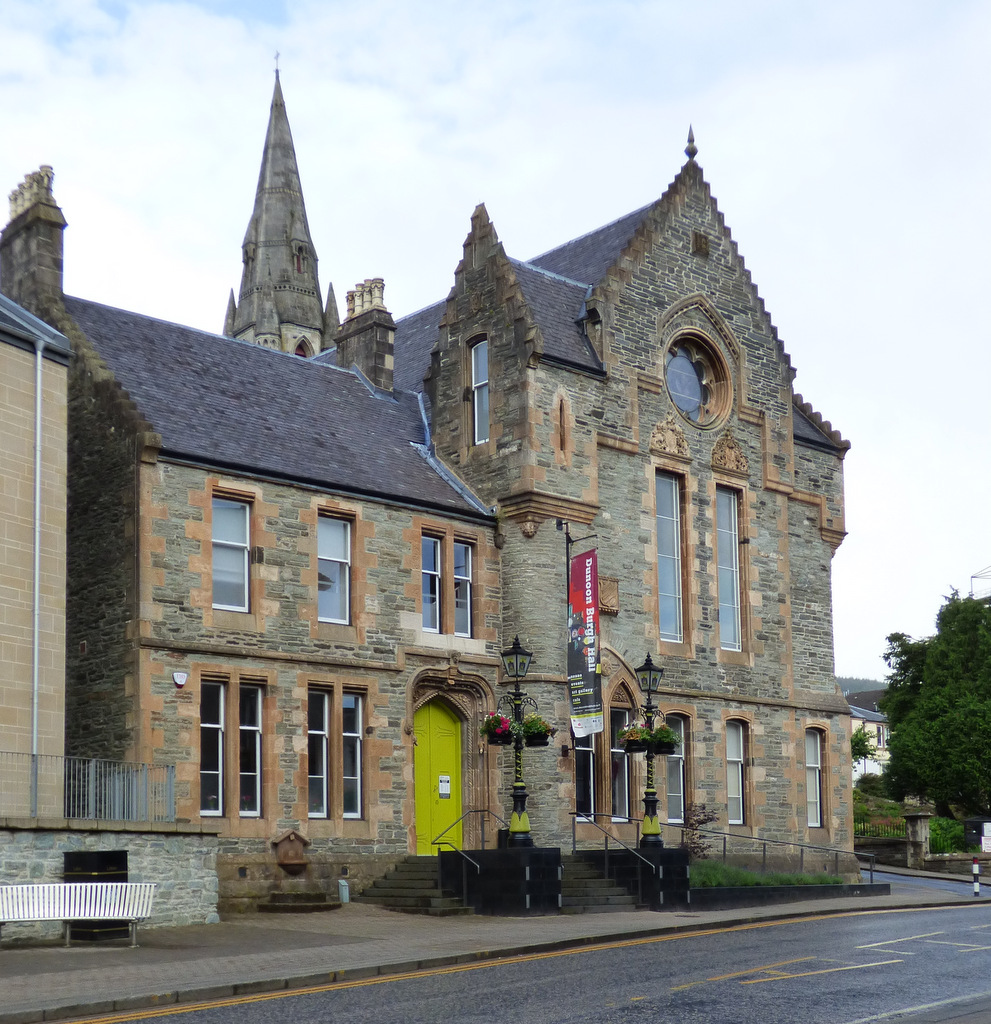
- Dunoon Burgh Hall (2019)

- Shown in Argyll and Bute Dunoon Burgh Hall (Scotland)
- 55.9504°N 4.9278°W
- Location: Argyll Street, Dunoon, Scotland

History
- Built: 1874 (152 years ago)

Site notes
- Architect: Robert Alexander Bryden
- Architectural style: Scottish baronial
- Website: Dunoon Burgh Hall

Listed Building – Category B
- Official name: Argyll Street, Burgh Hall Building
- Designated: 6 December 1993
- Reference no.: LB26439

Dunoon Burgh Hall is a municipal building in Argyll Street, Dunoon, Scotland. The structure, which is used as an events venue, is Category B listed.

== History ==
Following significant population growth, largely associated with the fishing industry, the area became a police burgh in 1868. In this context, the new police commissioners decided to procure a burgh hall: the site they selected was a piece of open land known as Gallowhill, which was part of land donated to the burgh by the local laird, James MacArthur Moir. (Note: Moir committed suicide in 1872 before the building was finished.)

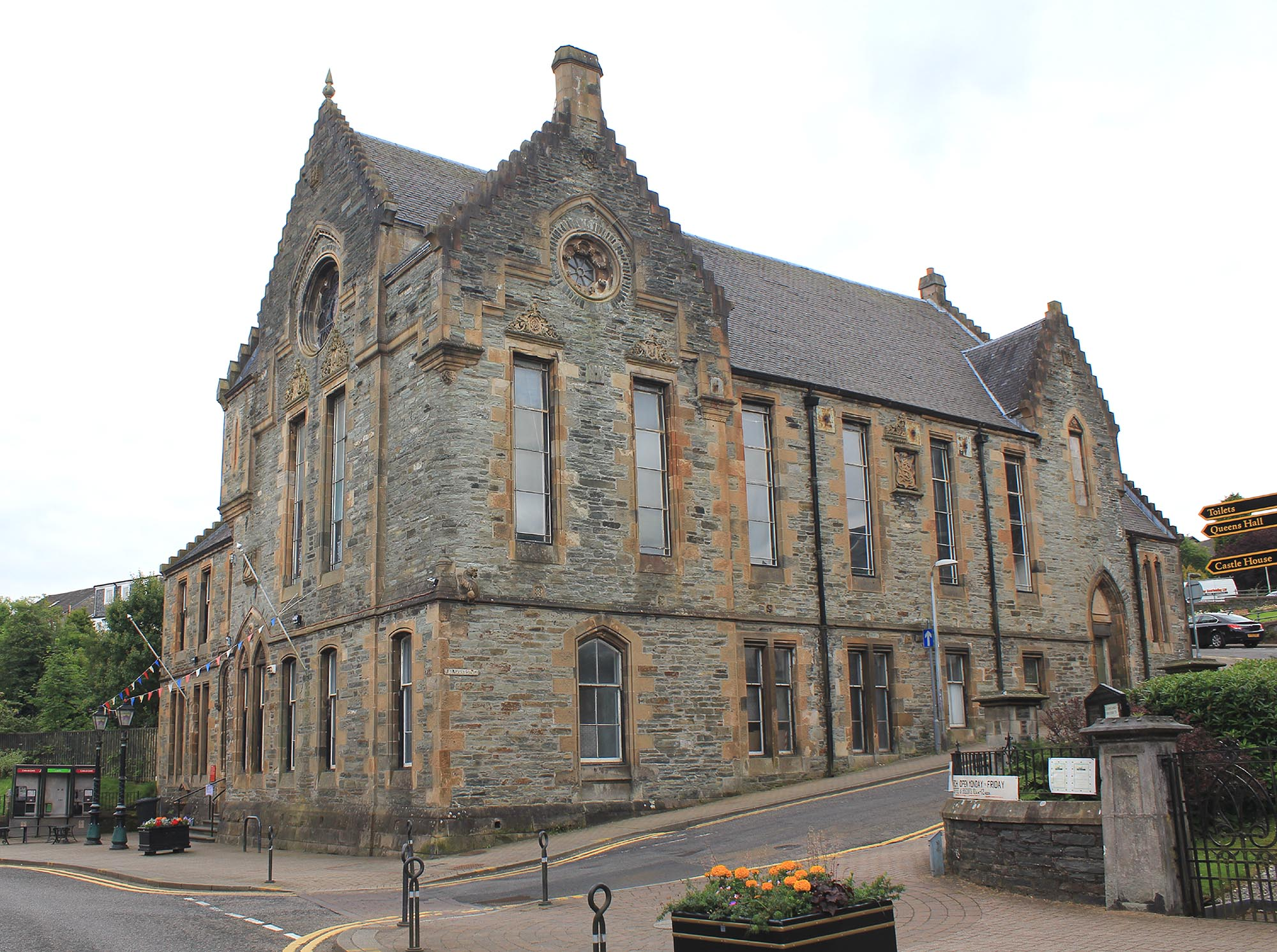
The hall's Hanover Street (north) elevation in 2011

The foundation stone for the new building was laid with full masonic honours on 30 August 1873. It was designed by Robert Alexander Bryden in the Scottish baronial style, built in schist stone at a cost of £4,000, and was officially opened on 25 June 1874. (Bryden also designed the adjacent and now-demolished St Cuthbert's Church around the same time.) The design involved an asymmetrical main frontage with six bays facing onto Argyll Street; the left-hand section, which accommodated the main offices, featured, in the right-hand bay, an arched doorway on the ground floor and a bi-partite window on the first floor. The other bays in the left-hand section were fenestrated with bi-partite windows on the ground floor and single windows on the first floor. The right-hand section, which projected forward and accommodated the main hall, featured, in the centre bay, two segmental windows on the ground floor, two tall square-headed windows on the first floor and a stepped gable containing a rose window on the second floor. The left-hand bay in this section featured twin arched windows on the ground floor with a bartizan above, while the right-hand bay was fenestrated with a single window on the ground floor. The stained glass in the rose window, which depicted a viking, was designed and manufactured by Ballantine and Allan. Internally, the principal room was the main assembly hall which was designed to accommodate 700 people.

Pollock's Dictionary of the Clyde, published in 1888, described the building as "one of the principal edifices in the town most worthy of notice". The building was altered in 1896 to create extra capacity; the changes included the creation of a seating gallery in the main hall, the transfer of the main entrance from Hanover Street to Argyll Street and an enlarged caretakers' flat.

During the Second World War, the burgh hall was used as a centre to administer the allocation of homes for 1,000 evacuee children from Glasgow. The burgh council closed the upper floors of the burgh hall after deciding to promote the Queen's Hall, which was rebuilt in 1959, as the main events venue in the town. The burgh hall ceased to be the local seat of government when the enlarged Argyll District Council was formed in 1975.

The upper floors of the building remained empty, and its condition deteriorated: the building was sold to Dunoon and Cowal Housing Association in 1993 and then to Fyne Homes in 2001. Fyne Homes presented proposals for the redevelopment of the building at a public meeting at Dunoon Grammar School in 2002 but, following local objections, the scheme did not proceed and the condition of the building continued to deteriorate.

The John McAslan Family Trust acquired the hall from Fyne Homes for a nominal sum in 2008. (Note: The matriarch of the family, Jean McAslan, who persuaded her son, the architect John McAslan, to restore the building, died on 23 June 2009.) The trust initiated an extensive programme of refurbishment works to convert the building into an arts and culture hub. The works, which were carried out to a design by Page\Park Architects, cost £3.5 million. The sources of funding included Creative Scotland, the Heritage Lottery Fund, Highlands and Islands Enterprise and Historic Environment Scotland. Following completion of the works, the building was reopened by the First Minister of Scotland, Nicola Sturgeon, in June 2017.

== Architectural detail ==
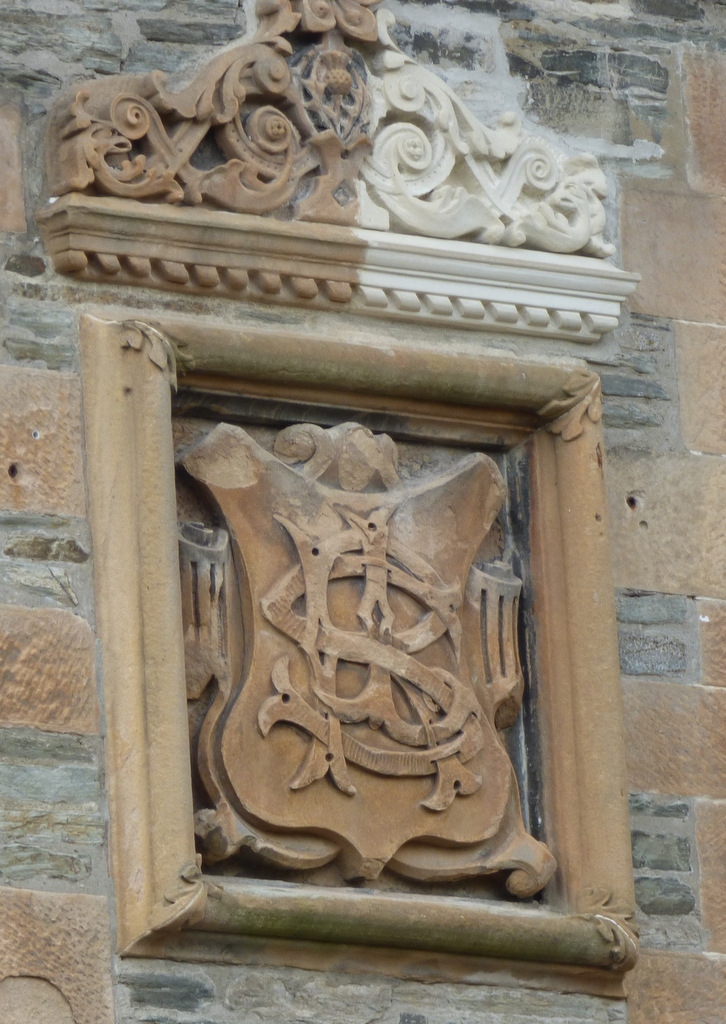
Stone carving detail

A stone carving on the building's Hanover Street elevation features the initials of Robert Leslie Smith, provost of Dunoon.

== See also ==
- List of listed buildings in Dunoon
