= Seafield Children's Hospital =

- NHS Ayrshire and Arran
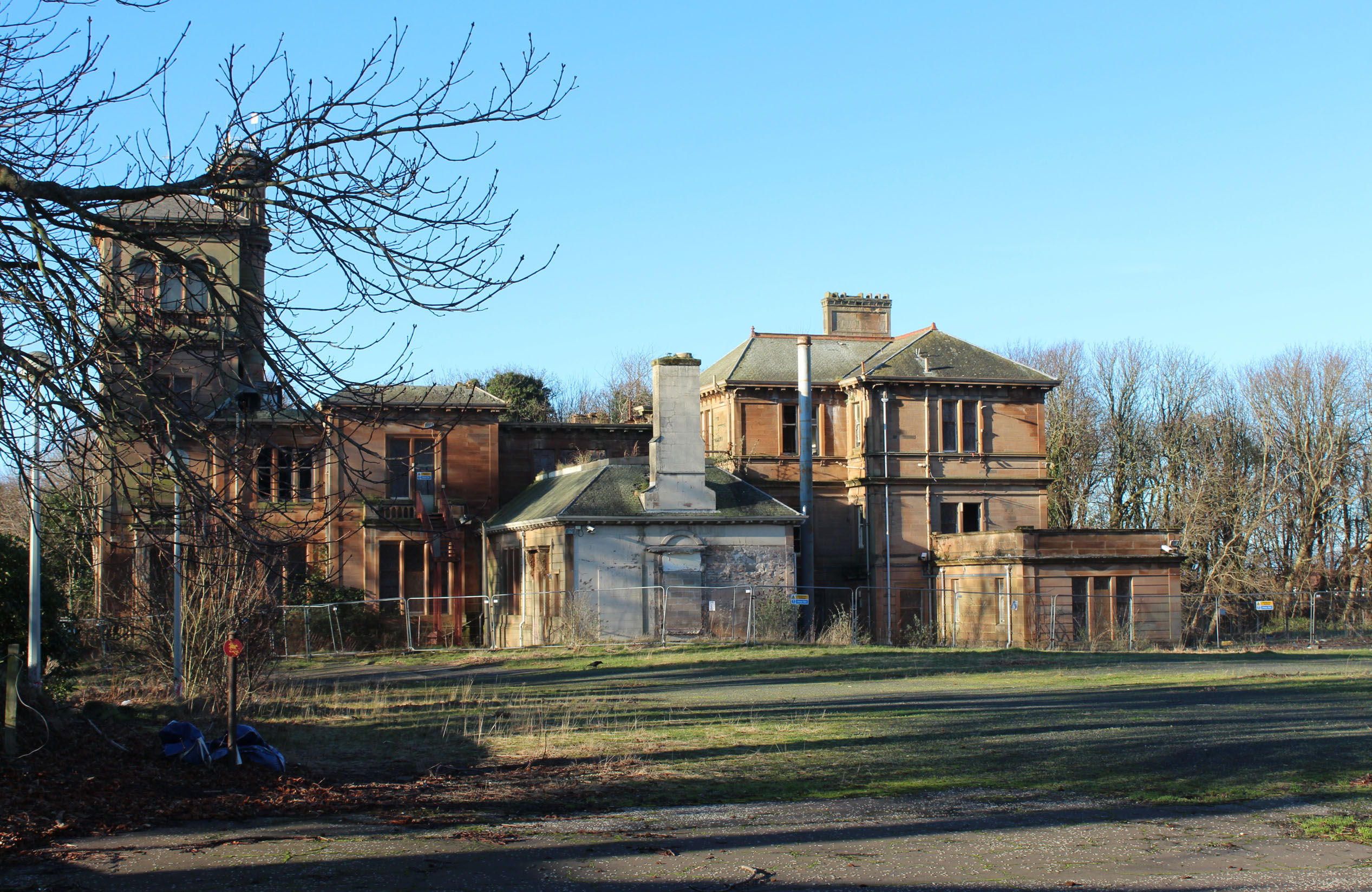
- Seafield Children's Hospital

- Shown in South Ayrshire

Geography
- Location: Doonfoot Road, Ayr, South Ayrshire, Scotland
- Coordinates: 55.4482°N 4.6413°W

Organisation
- Care system: NHS Scotland
- Type: Specialist

Services
- Speciality: Children's Hospital

History
- Founded: 1921
- Closed: 1991

Links
- Lists: Hospitals in Scotland

The Seafield Children's Hospital was a health facility in Doonfoot Road, Ayr, South Ayrshire, Scotland. It is a Category B listed building.

== History ==
Seafield House, which was originally commissioned by Sir William Arrol for use as his home, was completed in 1859. In 1888, it was rebuilt with the construction of a lodge by Clarke & Bell in the Italianate style. It was converted into an auxiliary hospital at the start of the First World War. It then became a children's hospital after the war and joined the National Health Service in 1948. After services transferred to the new Ayr Hospital, Seafield Children's Hospital closed in 1991. It was subsequently placed on the Buildings at Risk Register.
