= Dunoon Primary School =

Building in Scotland

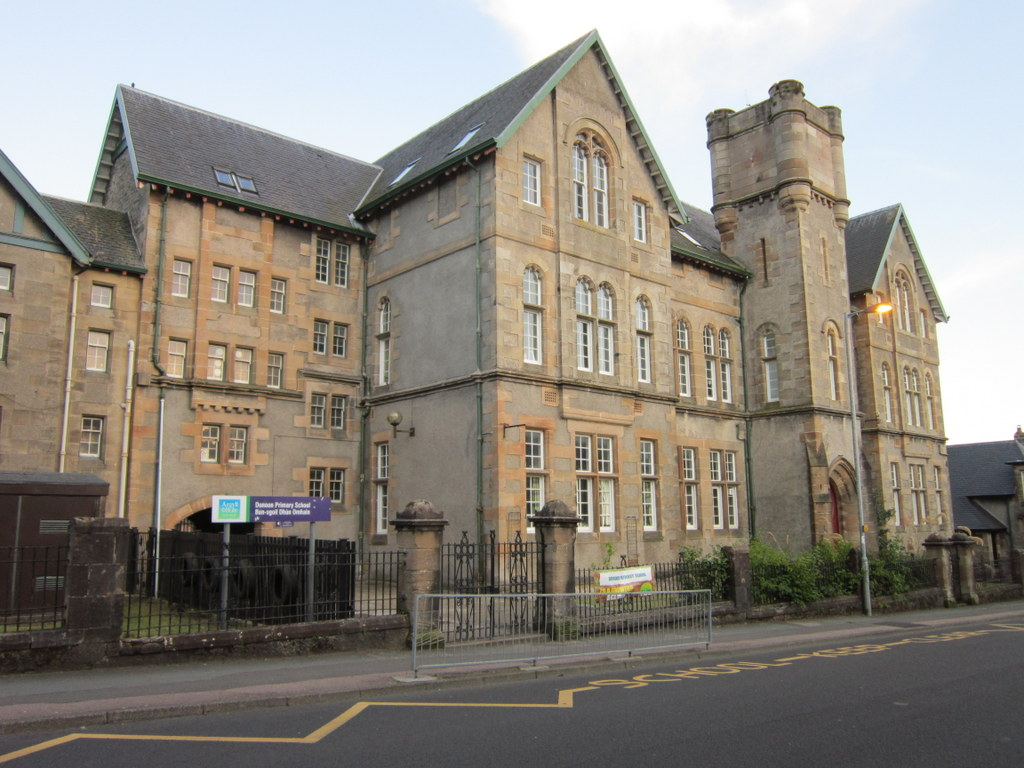
- The school in 2013
- Interactive map of the Dunoon Primary School area

General information
- Location: Hillfoot Street, Dunoon, Argyll and Bute, Scotland
- Coordinates: 55.947366°N 4.926926°W
- Completed: 1901 (125 years ago)

Design and construction
- Architect: William Fraser

Website
- Dunoon Primary School

Dunoon Primary School is a school in Dunoon, Argyll and Bute, Scotland. It is located in a Category B listed building dating from 1901. The school accommodates 300 pupils.

== History ==
The site was the original 1641 location of Dunoon Grammar School, now on Ardenslate Road. There is evidence of an episcopal seat at Dunoon from the latter part of the 15th century. No remains of the Bishop's Palace now exist, with the site now occupied by the playground of the school.

The building's architect was Lochgilphead native William Fraser, who was asked to design an extension to an earlier infants' school building (designed in 1880 by Robert Alexander Bryden and which burned down in 1958). Built in the Neo-Gothic style, the structure was constructed using blonde sandstone and harling. 1907 additions were done by Boston, Menzies and Morton. The gymnasium wing was added by Robert Cameron in 1934.

In December 2014, Argyll and Bute Council pledged £3.5 million for the refurbishment of the primary school and applied for funding from the government. In March 2015, the Scottish government provided an additional £4 million in funding as part of their £1.8 billion "Scotland's Schools for the Future" programme to retain the school's listed building status. The COVID-19 pandemic caused the refurbishment of the building to be halted in March 2020, with work not resuming until June 2020. Despite this, the building reached practical completion in November 2020.

== Janitors House ==
Janitors House is a single-storey attic cottage adjoining the school.

== See also ==
- List of listed buildings in Dunoon
