= Dunoon Grammar School =

Location
- Dunoon, Argyll; Scotland; 55°57′44″N 4°55′27″W

Information
- Type: Comprehensive Secondary
- Motto: Disciplina, Fides, Perseverantia (Discipline, Fidelity, and Perseverance)
- Established: 1641; 385 years ago
- Head Teacher: David Mitchell
- Teaching staff: approx. 70
- Enrollment: 670 as of 2017
- Affiliations: Dunoon Primary School; Kirn Primary School; Innellan Primary School; Kilmodan Primary School; Sandbank Primary School; Strachur Primary School; Strone Primary School; Tighnabruaich Primary School; Lochgoilhead Primary School; Toward Primary School
- Website: Dunoon Grammar School

Dunoon Grammar School is a secondary school in Dunoon, on the Cowal Peninsula, in Argyll and Bute, west of Scotland. It was founded in 1641.

It is currently a non-denominational comprehensive school which covers all stages from S1 to S6 (ages 12–18).

== Building ==
The present school building, which took two years to complete, is on Ardenslate Road, Kirn, and was opened to pupils and staff in August 2007. It consists of a main teaching block with two gymnasia, a fitness suite, dance studio, assembly hall, technology and technical areas and music rooms. There is a suite of rooms, purpose-built for education of pupils with additional support needs. Two astroturf sports pitches have been built on the site of the old school building, which was demolished in 2007. The pitches are serviced by training floodlights.

The newest building is the third Grammar School building in Dunoon. The first was in Hillfoot Street in the town, while the second was built on Ardenslate Road adjacent to where the latest facility is located. The Hillfoot Street premises became Dunoon Primary School when the newer building was built on Ardenslate Road in the 1960s.

The agreed maximum capacity of the school is 1150 pupils. As of 2013 it was well below this limit with 824 pupils and around 70 staff. The next year the roll fell to 783.

== Hostel ==
Unusually for a state school Dunoon has a boarding facility for some of its pupils. From Mondays to Fridays pupils from the furthest parts of the catchment area stay here in preference to a twice daily 30-mile bus journey. The concrete facility, built in the 1960s, superseded the system of local digs, which were used in earlier eras by the likes of Labour party leader John Smith. The pupils using the hostel are cared for by a staff of seven.

== Primary schools ==
As the only secondary school in Cowal, Dunoon Grammar receives pupils from all of the primaries on the peninsula. These include primary schools in Dunoon, Kirn, Innellan, Kilmodan, Sandbank, Strachur, Strone, Tighnabruaich, Lochgoilhead and Toward.

== School roll ==
In recent decades the total roll has been falling. The number of pupils staying for S5 and S6 has increased over the same period. The school had higher numbers between the 1960s and 1990s when an American naval squadron was based at Holy Loch.

== Exam pass rate ==
In 2012 it was shown that the exam pass rate among senior pupils at the school had lagged behind the rest of Argyll and Bute for the past 3 years consecutively.

== Head teachers ==
Name	Duration
Joe Rhodes	1981-2008
Stewart Shaw	2008-2013
David Mitchell	2013-

== Notable former pupils ==
- Reverend Donald Caskie – Church of Scotland minister in Paris, also known as the Tartan Pimpernel for helping an estimated 2000 Allied servicemen escape from occupied France during World War II.
- John MacKay, Baron MacKay of Ardbrecknish - Conservative MP, deputy speaker of the House of Lords
- Sylvester McCoy - actor, best known as the Seventh Doctor in Doctor Who.
- George Robertson, Baron Robertson of Port Ellen – former Labour Party politician and secretary-general of NATO from 1999–2004.
- John Smith – politician who served as leader of the Labour Party from July 1992 until his death on 12 May 1994.
- Brian Wilson – former Labour Party politician.
