= William Robertson Copland =

British civil engineer

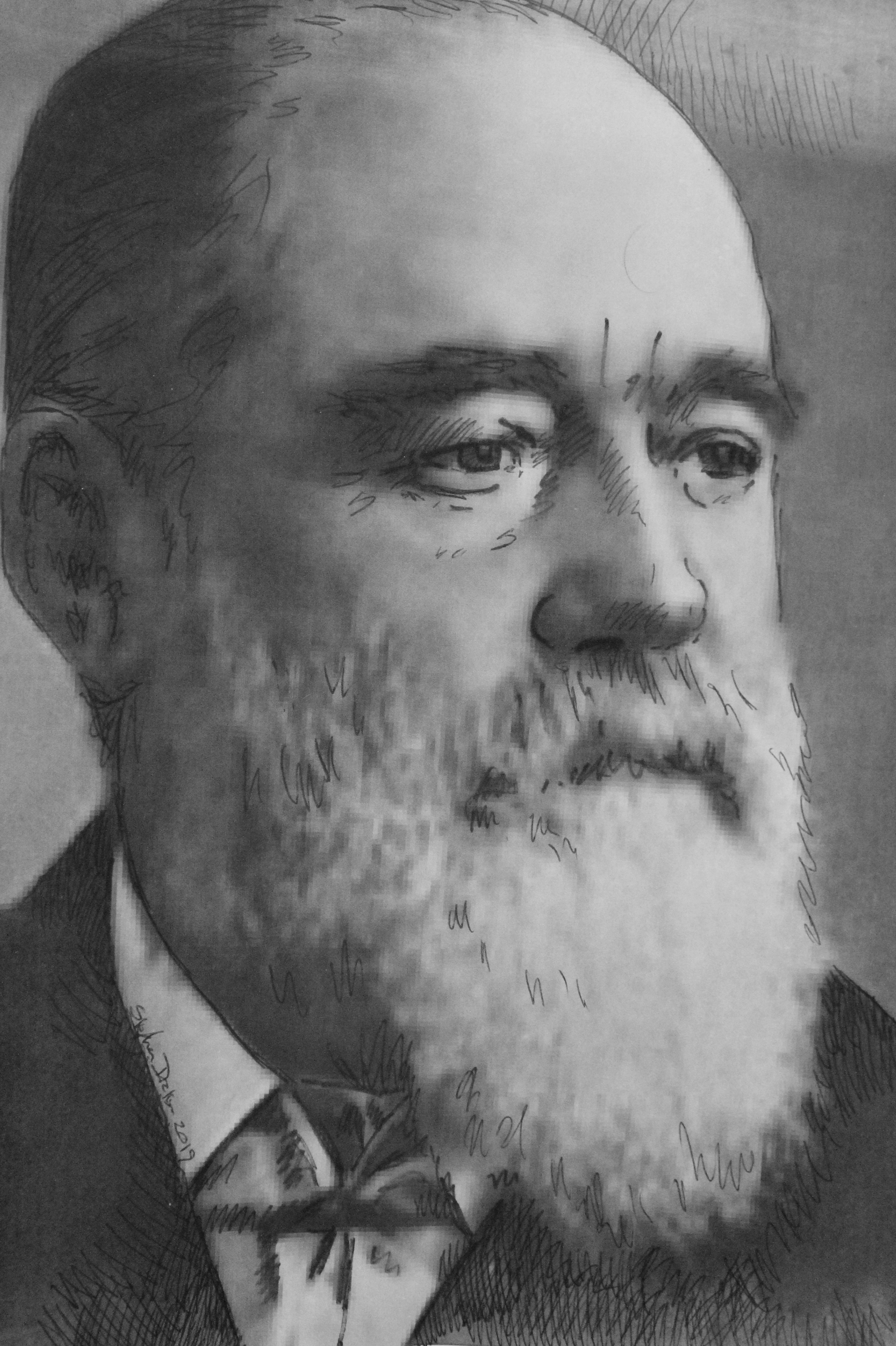
William Robertson Copland c.1890

Sir William Robertson Copland MICE LLD (1838–1907) was a 19th-century British civil engineer, specialising in drainage and water supply.

== Life ==
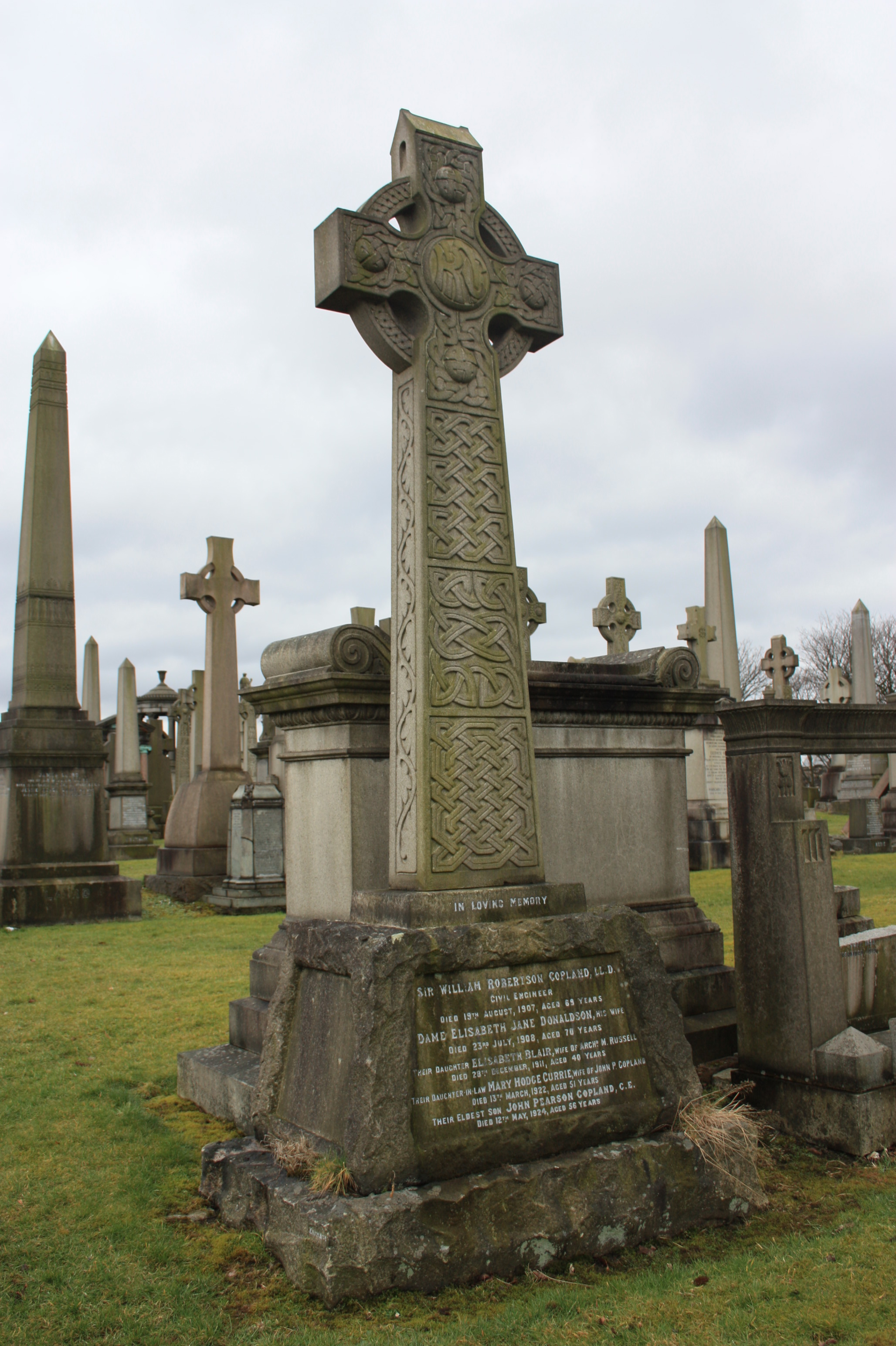
The grave of Sir William Robertson Copland, Glasgow Necropolis

He was born in Stirling in central Scotland in 1838, the son of John Copland a merchant tailor who was later Chairman of Glasgow Technical College.

He was educated at Stirling High School then studied Engineering at Glasgow University. He was then apprenticed to David Smith from 1850 to 1856. He then joined the Edinburgh and Glasgow Railway Company before becoming Burgh engineer to Paisley.

Copland was involved in the renovation of Dunoon Pier in the second half of the 19th century.

In later life he was heavily involved in the Glasgow Technical College and its expansion. He became Chairman of the Board of Governors in 1897.

He had premises with his firm Copland & Foulis at 146 West Regent Street. He was knighted by King Edward VII in 1906 and received an honorary doctorate (LLD) from Glasgow University in 1907.

He died of a heart attack at his home, 20 Sandyford Place, in Glasgow on 19 August 1907 and is buried in Glasgow Necropolis, near the summit.

== Family ==
He was married to Elizabeth Jane Donaldson (died 1908). They had one daughter and five sons.

Their eldest son, John Pearson Copland, was also a civil engineer. For some time they practiced jointly as W R Copland & Sons.
