= George Jardine =

Scottish minister of religion, philosopher, academic and educator

Rev George Jardine FRSE (1742 – January 28, 1827) was a Scottish minister of religion, philosopher, academic and educator. He was Professor at the University of Glasgow, of Greek from 1774, and then Professor of Logic and Rhetoric 1787 to 1824. He was a co-founder of the Royal Society of Edinburgh in 1783 and co-founder of Glasgow Royal Infirmary in 1792.

At the University of Glasgow he was a pioneer of collaborative learning; he wrote up his method in a book. He designed a peer review method with rules to be followed by peer editors, whom he labeled “examinators.” By participating in collaborative learning settings, Jardine thought, students develop interpersonal traits and skills “indispensable at once to the cultivation of science, and to the business of active life.”

== Life ==
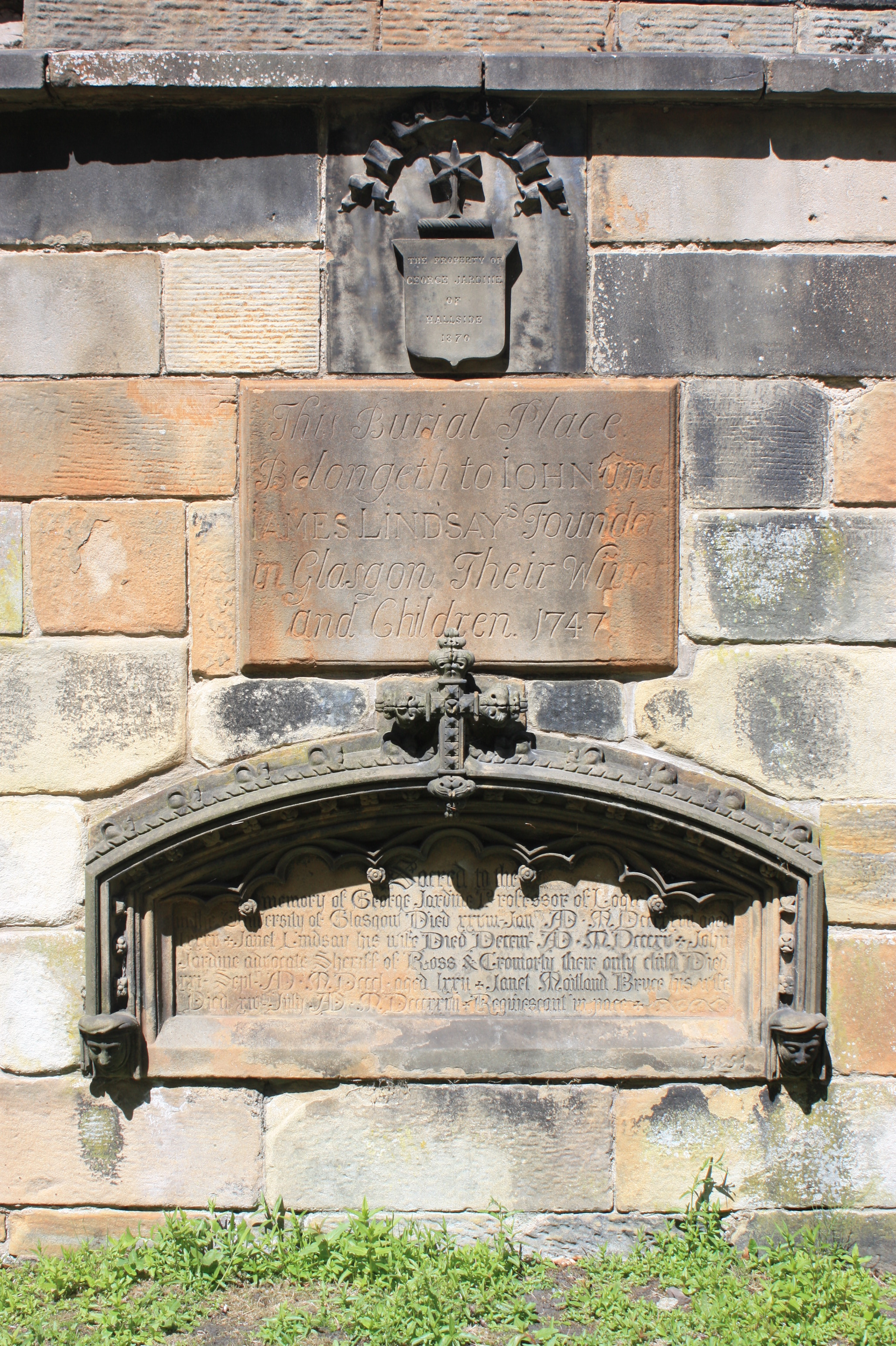
The grave of prof George Jardine, Glasgow Cathedral churchyard

He was born in 1742 at Wandel in Lanarkshire where his predecessors had resided for nearly two hundred years. His mother was a daughter of Weir of Birkwood, in the parish of Lesmahagow. Jardine was transferred in October 1760 from the parish school to Glasgow College, and after passing through the arts and divinity courses (MA 1765), was licensed to preach by the presbytery of Linlithgow.

In 1770 he went to Paris as tutor to the sons of William Mure of Caldwell, who obtained for him from David Hume introductions to Helvetius and D'Alembert. Soon after his return from France in July 1773, he failed to secure election to the chair of humanity at Glasgow, by a single vote, but in June 1774 was appointed professor of Greek and assistant professor in logic to Prof Clow. On Clow's death in 1787 he became sole professor of logic.

Jardine gave a practical turn to the teaching of his chair, and established a system of daily examination. His classes rose from an average of fifty to nearly two hundred. He expounded his principles of teaching in his Outlines of Philosophical Education, published at Glasgow, 1818; 2nd edit. 1825. He was also an administrator and brought the finances of the college to order.

Jardine created the introductory college course, which presented new or difficult material in small and digestible pieces rather than as a single imposing system that students had to either understand or fail. Jardine also insisted that lectures be interspersed with regular examinations, in order to gauge the students’ progress, and on which students had to write themes or original essays. His Outlines of Philosophical Education, Illustrated by the Method of Teaching the Logic Class at the University of Glasgow became one of the most popular textbooks in American higher education. It explained how to create a stimulating intellectual atmosphere in the classroom and lecture hall. It created a system of “writing across the curriculum,” as it would later be called, with compositions, essays, and research papers assigned in every class and at every level, which taught students how to think for themselves, but also how to write clear, incisive, original English prose.

He had a country house, Hallside (near Cambuslang and modern-day Drumsagard Village) constructed in 1790. In town he had rooms within the university courtyard.

He was one of the founders in 1792, and afterwards for more than twenty years secretary, of Glasgow Royal Infirmary. For over thirty years he was the representative of the presbytery of Hamilton in the General Assembly of the Church of Scotland. He retired from the chair of logic in 1824, and died on 27 January 1827.

He is buried in the Lindsay plot on the north side of the churchyard around Glasgow Cathedral.

== Family ==
In 1776 Jardine married Janet Lindsay, daughter of John Lindsay, founder in Glasgow. She died in 1815. They had one son, John Jardine, advocate, who held the office of sheriff of Ross and Cromarty, and died in 1850.

They are both buried with him.

== Legacy ==
Among those apparently influenced by Jardine was Alexander Campbell, founder of Bethany College, West Virginia. Jardine's pupils included Christopher North and Sir William Hamilton.

== Artistic recognition ==
Jardine's portrait, by John Graham-Gilbert, hangs in the Hunterian Art Gallery in Glasgow. He was also painted by Thomas Hodgetts in 1827 and by Sir Henry Raeburn (who also portrayed Mrs Jardine).
