= List of listed buildings in Dunoon =

This is a list of listed buildings in the parish of Dunoon, on the Cowal Peninsula, in Argyll and Bute, Scotland.

== List ==
Name	Location	Date listed	Grid ref. (Note: Sometimes known as OSGB36, the grid reference (where provided) is based on the British national grid reference system used by the Ordnance Survey. • "Guide to National Grid". Ordnance Survey. • "Get-a-map". Ordnance Survey.)	Geo-coordinates	Notes	LB number (Note: Historic Environment Scotland assign a unique alphanumeric identifier to each designated site in Scotland, for listed buildings this always begins with "LB", for example "LB12345".)	Image
34 Argyll Road, Edgemont				55°57′20″N 4°55′18″W	Category B	44182	Upload Photo
Kirk Street, Boundary Wall Of Castle Gardens				55°56′44″N 4°55′28″W	Category B	26433	Upload Photo
Gate-Lodge To Castle House With Gate-Piers And Screen Walls, Pier Esplanade				55°56′46″N 4°55′24″W	Category B	26435	Upload Photo
George Hotel, George Street				55°57′08″N 4°55′27″W	Category C(S)	26443	Upload another image
Auchamore Farmhouse And Steading With Boundary Wall, Auchamore Road				55°56′51″N 4°56′12″W	Category B	26446	Upload Photo
Kilbride Bridge, Over Balgie Burn				55°56′49″N 4°56′20″W	Category C(S)	26447	Upload another image
Hunters Quay, Marine Parade, Hunters Quay Hotel				55°58′11″N 4°54′32″W	Category C(S)	50810	Upload another image
Corner House, 2 Castle Street And 44 Kirk Street And Adjoining Wall To North				55°56′48″N 4°55′32″W	Category B	26431	Upload Photo
Argyll Hotel, Argyll Street				55°56′54″N 4°55′28″W	Category B	26438	Upload another image
Corner Tenement Moir Place And Church Street				55°57′02″N 4°55′32″W	Category C(S)	26441	Upload Photo
Clyde Cottage, Alexandra Parade				55°57′03″N 4°55′29″W	Category B	26442	Upload Photo
Hunter's Quay, Cammes Reinach				55°58′14″N 4°54′31″W	Category B	26444	Upload another image
Milton House (District Council Offices)				55°56′54″N 4°55′37″W	Category B	26451	Upload Photo
Hunter's Quay, Royal Marine Hotel (Former Royal Northern And Later Royal Clyde Yacht Club) Including Lodge, Boundary Walls And Gatepiers				55°58′12″N 4°54′38″W	Category B	46551	Upload another image
4, 6, 8 Castle Street				55°56′48″N 4°55′32″W	Category B	26432	Upload Photo
St. John's Church Of Scotland. Hanover Street And Argyll Street				55°57′02″N 4°55′45″W	Category A	26440	Upload another image
Dunoon Pier & Entrance Lodge				55°56′48″N 4°55′18″W	Category B	26450	Upload another image
Statue Of Highland Mary				55°56′44″N 4°55′24″W	Category B	26437	Upload another image
Holy Trinity Church, Kilbride Hill (Episcopal)				55°56′46″N 4°56′22″W	Category B	26448	Upload another image
Dunoon High Kirk (Old Parish Church), Kirk Street, Church Of Scotland				55°56′50″N 4°55′32″W	Category B	26429	Upload another image
'Ballochyle House' Kirk Street				55°56′51″N 4°55′33″W	Category B	26430	Upload Photo
Castle House, Castle Gardens				55°56′46″N 4°55′28″W	Category B	26434	Upload another image
Kirn, The Queen's Hotel				55°57′38″N 4°54′40″W	Category C(S)	44187	Upload another image
Dunoon Castle				55°56′45″N 4°55′26″W	Category B	26436	Upload another image
Argyll Street, Burgh Hall Building				55°57′02″N 4°55′41″W	Category B	26439	Upload another image
'Beach House' Corner Of Jane Street And Clyde Street				55°56′44″N 4°55′44″W	Category B	26445	Upload Photo
Kirn Church Of Scotland, Kirn Brae				55°57′46″N 4°54′38″W	Category B	26449	Upload another image
Hillfoot Street, Dunoon Primary School And Janitor's House				55°56′51″N 4°55′37″W	Category B	50809	Upload another image

== Key ==
The scheme for classifying buildings in Scotland is:

- Category A: "buildings of national or international importance, either architectural or historic; or fine, little-altered examples of some particular period, style or building type."
- Category B: "buildings of regional or more than local importance; or major examples of some particular period, style or building type, which may have been altered."
- Category C: "buildings of local importance; lesser examples of any period, style, or building type, as originally constructed or moderately altered; and simple traditional buildings which group well with other listed buildings."

In March 2016 there were 47,288 listed buildings in Scotland. Of these, 8% were Category A, and 50% were Category B, with the remaining 42% being Category C.

== See also ==
- List of listed buildings in Argyll and Bute
