= Highland Mary (statue) =

Scottish monument

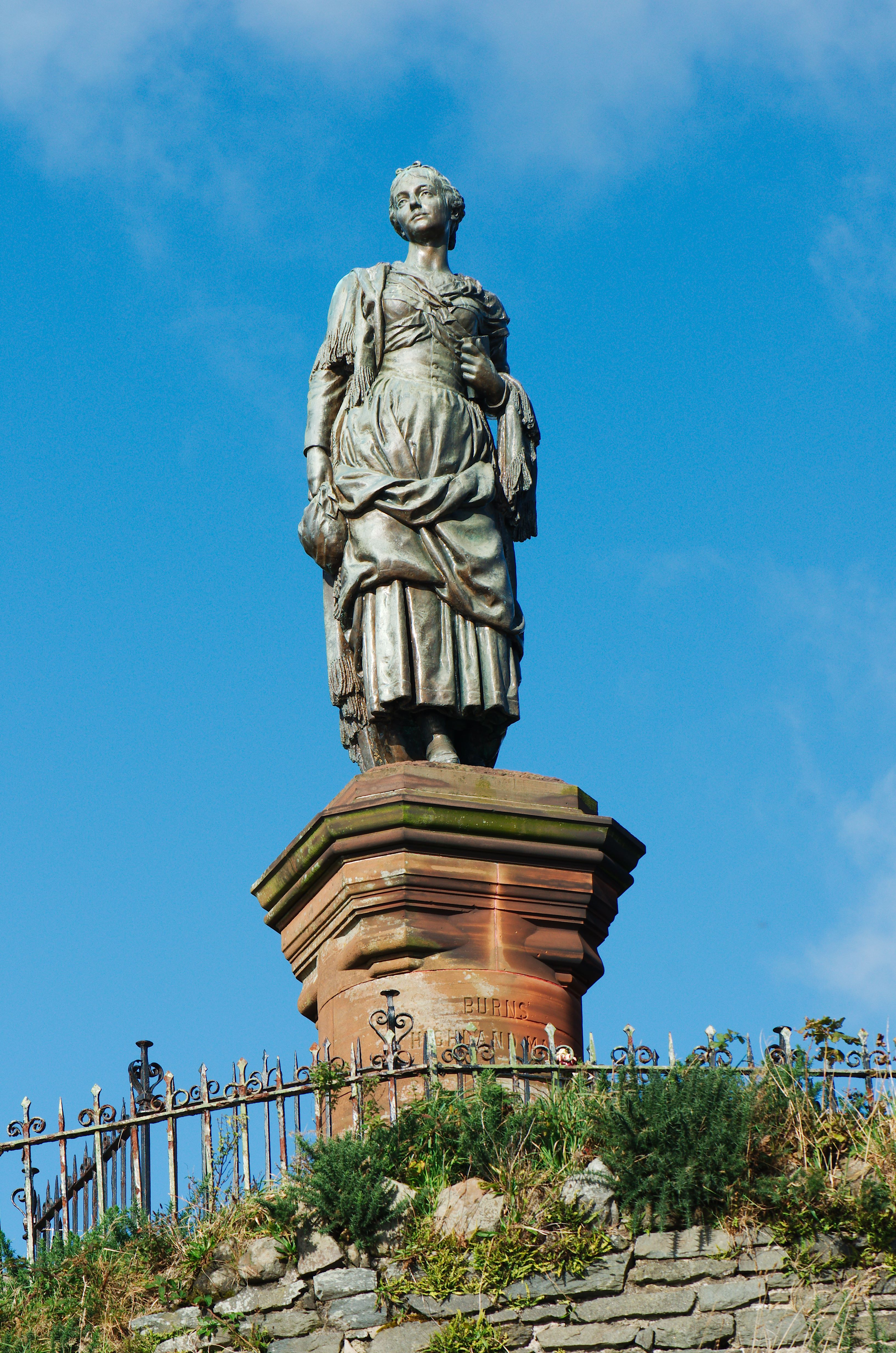
- The statue in 2015
- Interactive map of Highland Mary
- Location: Castle Hill; Dunoon; Argyll and Bute; Scotland
- Coordinates: 55.945680°N 4.923193°W
- Designer: David Watson Stevenson
- Type: Statue
- Material: Bronze
- Opening date: 1896
- Dedicated to: Mary Campbell

Highland Mary is a Category B listed monument in Dunoon, Scotland, dedicated to Mary Campbell, the lover of Robert Burns. The statue overlooks the Firth of Clyde.

The statue, unveiled on 21 July 1896, the centenary of Burns' death, and made of bronze, was sculpted by David Watson Stevenson. It stands, facing southeast, on a round ashlar pedestal with an octagonal cap and base. It is inscribed Burns Highland Mary.

A reduced size (96 cm (38 in)) plaster copy of the statue is held in the Robert Burns Birthplace Museum in South Ayrshire.

== See also ==
- List of listed buildings in Dunoon
