= Mary Campbell (Highland Mary) =

Lover of Robert Burns

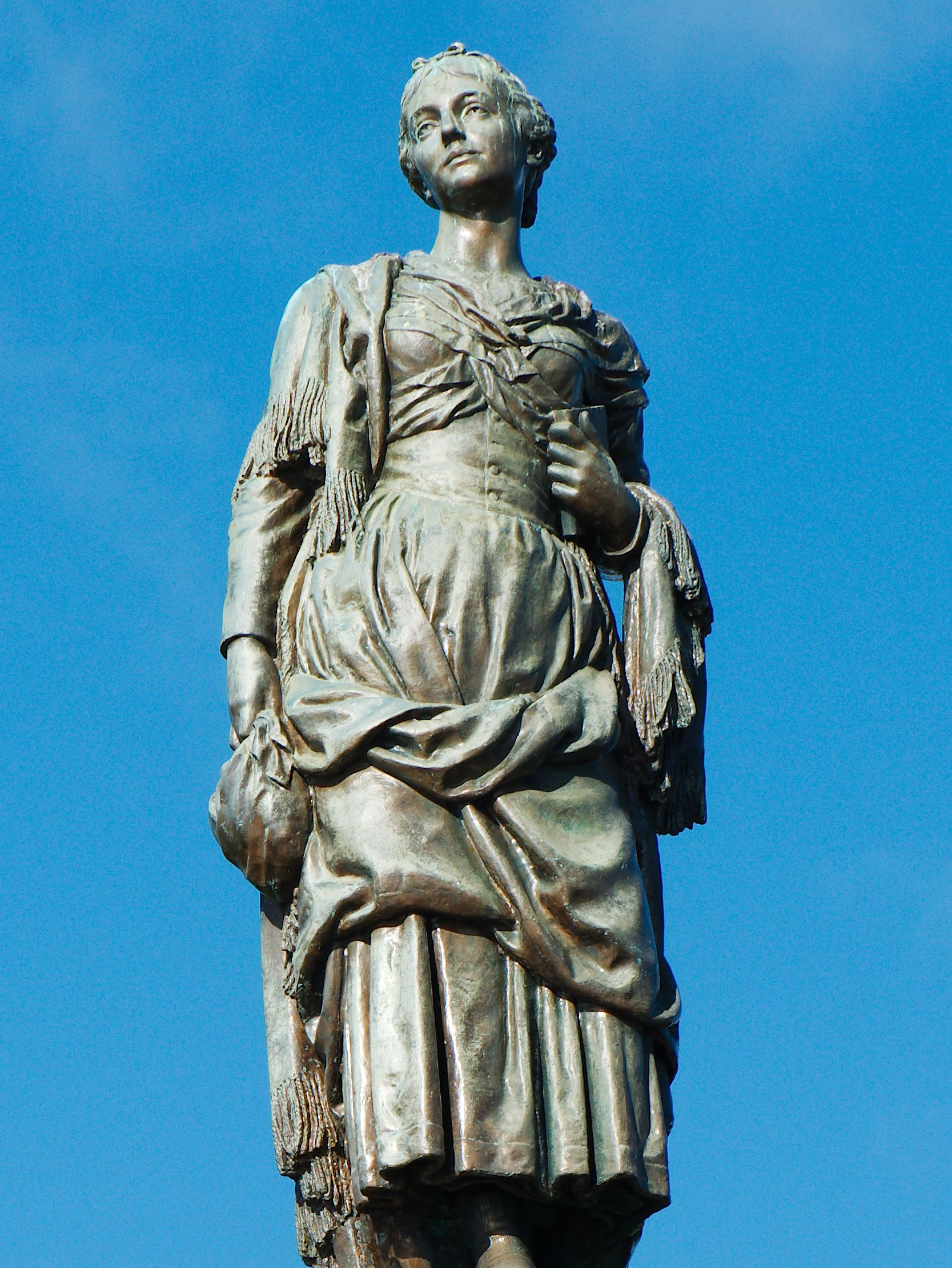
- A statue of Highland Mary at Dunoon
- Born: March 1763; Dunoon, Scotland
- Died: 1786 (aged 22–23); Greenock, Scotland
- Occupation(s): Nursemaid and dairymaid

Mary Campbell, also known as Highland Mary (christened Margaret, March 1763 – 1786), was the daughter of Archibald Campbell of Daling, a sailor in a revenue cutter, whose wife was Agnes Campbell of Achnamore or Auchamore. Mary was the eldest of a family of four. Robert Burns had an affair with her after he felt that he had been "deserted" by Jean Armour following her move to Paisley in March 1786. The brief affair started in April 1786, and the parting took place on 14 May of that year. Mary's pronunciation of English was heavily accented with the lilt of local indigenous language, Gaelic - and this led to her becoming known as 'Highland Mary.'

== Life and character ==
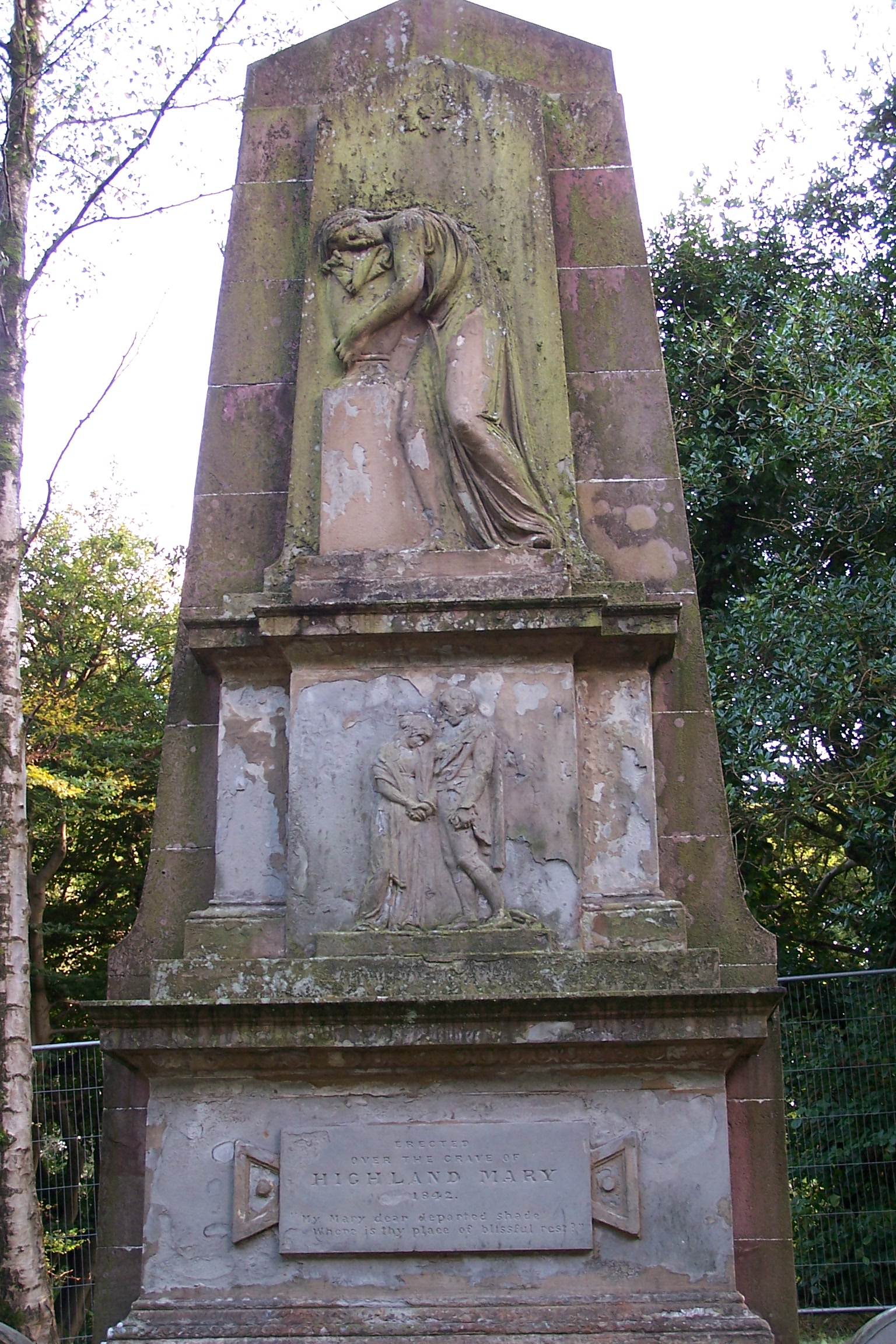
Monument erected in 1842 over the grave of Highland Mary in the old West Kirkyard, Greenock

Mary lived with her parents, first, near her birthplace of Dunoon on the Cowal Peninsula. In 1768, the family moved to Campbeltown then later, finally, to Greenock. Her three siblings, Robert, Annie and Archibald, were born at Campbeltown. She is said to have spent some time at Lochranza on Arran, living with the Rev. David Campbell, minister of that parish and a relative of her mother's. She was described as a "...sweet, sprightly, blue-eyed creature." In her early teens, she went to Ayrshire and became a nursemaid in Gavin Hamilton's house in Mauchline. She is said to have worked as a young servant girl in Irvine.

Gavin Hamilton's married daughter, Mrs Todd, recalled Mary Campbell coming to look after her brother Alexander as a nursemaid in 1785, describing Mary as 'very pleasant and winning', though not a beauty. From Mauchline, she moved to Coilsfield House, later Montgomery Castle, where she was employed as a dairy-maid or byres-woman. She gained this position through the offices of Miss Arbukle of Campbeltown who had married into the Eglinton family.

According to Grierson, who met Mary's sister, Mrs Anderson, in 1817, Mary was "tall, fair haired with blue eyes". She was also described by Miss McNeill to have been "a great favourite with everyone who knew her, due to her pleasant manners, sweet temper and obliging disposition. Her figure was graceful; the cast of her face was singularly delicate and of fair complexion, and her eyes were bluish and lustrous had a remarkably winning expression."

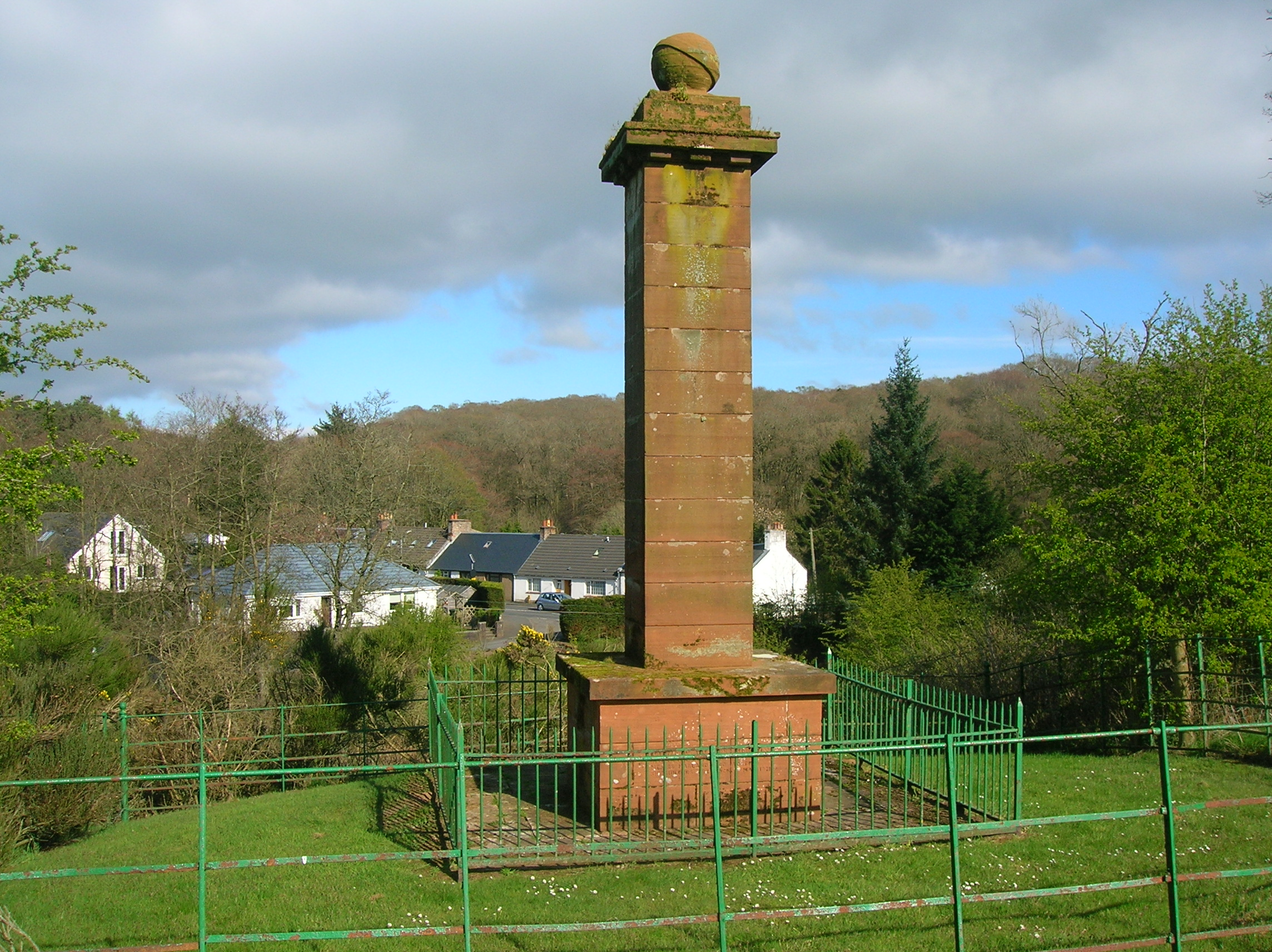
Memorial to the parting of Robert Burns and Highland Mary at Failford

Mary Campbell died at the age of 23, around 20 October 1786, probably from typhus contracted when nursing her brother Robert. She was buried in the old West Kirk churchyard at Greenock, in a lair owned by her host and relation Peter Macpherson. A story is told that some superstitious friends believed that her illness was as a result of someone casting the evil eye upon her. Her father was urged to go to a place where two streams meet, select seven smooth stones, boil them in milk, and treat her with the potion. An 1842 monument in her memory was designed by John Mossman. It was asserted by some older inhabitants of Greenock that the monument was not erected in the right spot, and that her body had been interred closer to the kirk. A statue of her was also erected at Dunoon on the Castle Hill.

=== Association with Robert Burns ===
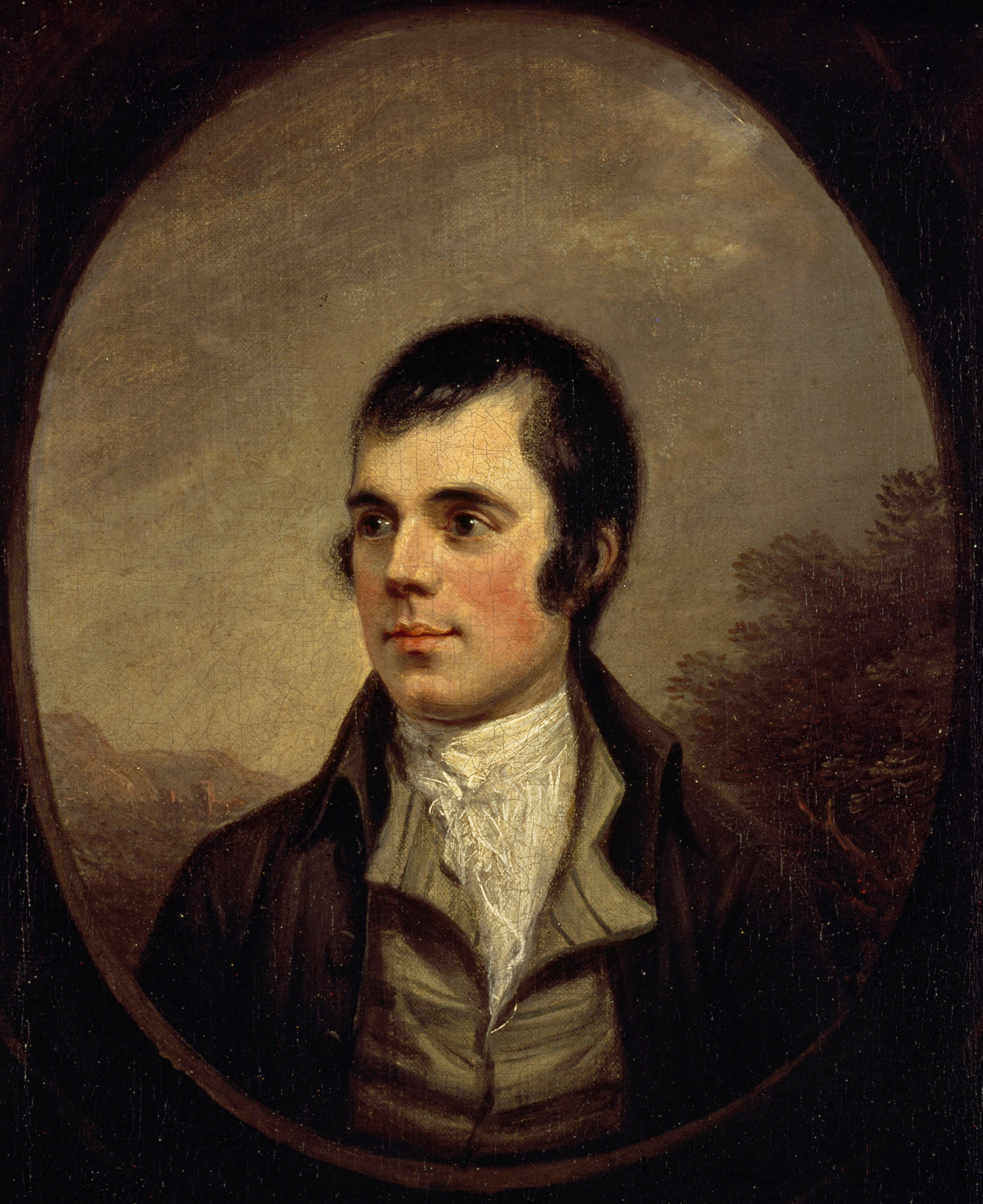
Full view of the Naysmith portrait of 1787, Scottish National Portrait Gallery

It was R.H.Cromek in his Reliques of Robert Burns, who first recorded Mary Campbell's name in print. In his notes on The Highland Lassie O that he wrote in the Robert Riddell song manuscript, now lost, but recorded by Cromek, he stated:

This was a composition of mine in very early life, before I was known at all in the world. My Highland lassie was a warm-hearted, charming young creature as ever blessed a man with generous love. After a pretty long tract of the most ardent reciprocal attachment, we met by appointment, on the second Sunday of May, in a sequestered spot by the Banks of Ayr, where we spent the day in taking a farewel, before she should embark for the West-Highlands, to arrange matters among her friends for our projected change of life. At the close of Autumn following she crossed the sea to meet me at Greenock, where she had scarce landed when she was seized with a malignant fever, which hurried my dear girl to the grave in a few days, before I could even hear of her illness.

Burns had first seen Mary Campbell in church while he was living near Tarbolton. He dedicated the works "The Highland Lassie O", "Highland Mary" and "To Mary in Heaven" to her. His song "Will ye go to the Indies, my Mary, And leave auld Scotia's shore?" suggests that they planned to emigrate to Jamaica together. However, after a brief illness, she died at Greenock. Burns and Mary Campbell apparently exchanged Bibles over a water course and possibly some sort of traditional Scottish matrimonial vows on the banks of the River Ayr, either at Failford or where the Water of Coil has its confluence or near Coilsfield. Burns had written biblical verses in his bible (two volumes), signed them and impressed his masonic sign. It has also been suggested that she lived instead at Stairaird and that they exchanged bibles over the nearby Mauchline Burn.

The bible volumes were kept by Mary's mother. In one was written "And ye shall not swear by my name falsely—I am the Lord" (Levit. xvi. 12); in the other "Thou shalt not forswear thyself, but shalt perform unto the Lord thine oath" (St. Matt. v. 33). Despite her poverty, Mrs Campbell kept the volumes and passed them on to her daughter Mrs Anderson upon her death at Greenock in 1828. William Anderson inherited them via his sisters and, in 1834, he emigrated to Canada taking them with him. In Canada, they lay for a time until admirers heard of them and purchased them for £25 so that they could be kept at the Brig o'Doon Museum.

He is said to have met Mary at the "Burn's Thorn" or "Mary's Tryst" that grew close a path close to the western side of the house at Coilsfield. The tree was later a victim of relic-hunters.

She was staying in Greenock with relatives whilst waiting to take up employment with the family of Colonel McIvor at Glasgow.

Burns's sister, Isabella Burns, recollected that he had once remarked to John Blane, the 'gaudman', that Mary had refused to meet with him in the old castle, the dismantled tower of the priory at Mauchline. Additionally, Burns is said to have received one evening at Mossgiel a letter that caused him great sadness, almost certainly the letter that informed him of Mary's death at Greenock.

Years after her death, Burns would think of her fondly and with great sadness. As stated, the heartfelt poem "To Mary in Heaven" was written at Ellisland Farm on the third anniversary of her death. Jean Armour recalled that towards evening, the night before, Robert grew sad, and wandered in solitary contemplation along the banks of the River Nith and about the farmyard in extreme agitation. Even though he was repeatedly asked to come into the house, he would not. Burns entered the house at daybreak, sat down and wrote his address to "Mary in Heaven".

Captain James Montgomerie

Mary Campbell had probably been the mistress of the Earl of Eglinton's brother, Captain James Montgomerie of Coilsfield.

=== Poetry and song ===
Mary inspired some of Burns's finest and most famous poems. The following lines refer to his separation from her at Coilsfield (Montgomery Castle):

Ye banks and braes and streams around
The castle of Montgomerie,
Green be your woods, and fair your flowers,
Your waters never drumlie!
There simmer first unfauld her robes,
And there the longest tarry!
For there I took the last fareweel
O' my Sweet Highland Mary.

The song 'Montgomerie's Peggy' alludes to her association with Captain James Montgomerie :

Were I a Baron proud and high,
And horse and servants waiting ready,
Then a' 'twad gie o'joy to me –
The shairin't wi' Montgomerie's Peggy.

In the mid 19th century, a broadside ballad with the title "Bonny Mary of Argyle" was published by James Lindsay of 11 King Street, Glasgow. The song was about "Highland Mary" Campbell, and was apparently written by two Englishmen.

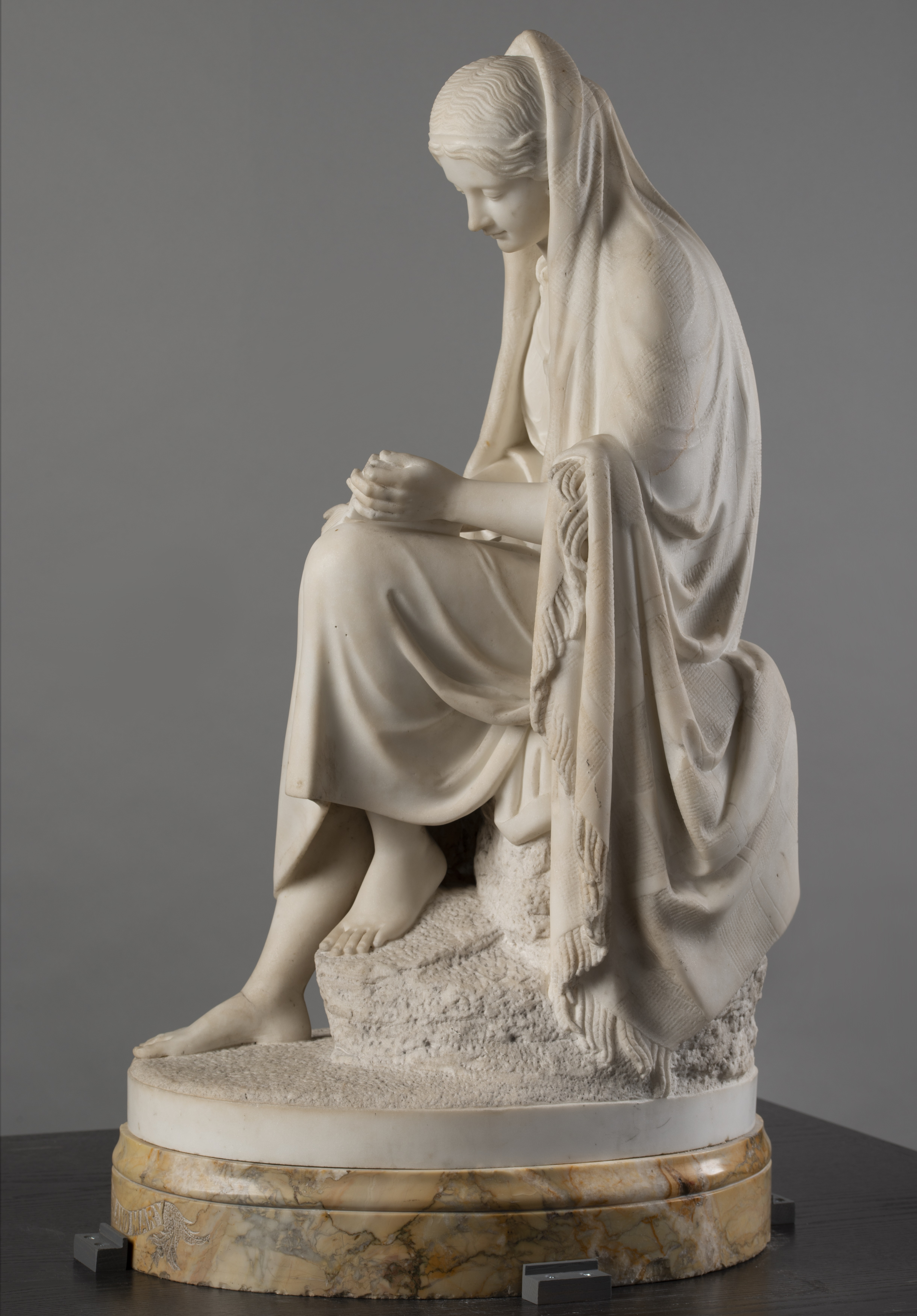
Highland Mary by Alexander Brodie (1863)

== Move of grave to Greenock Cemetery ==
With the intention of enlarging their Greenock shipyard to take over the site, Harland and Wolff requested that the Old West Kirk and its cemetery be demolished. The whole church was taken apart and re-erected at a site further west, on the corner of Greenock's Esplanade. The remains of the churchyard burials were re-interred in a mass grave in Greenock Cemetery, with an exception being made for Mary's grave. On 5 November 1920, 134 years after Mary's death, her grave was opened and the three lairs removed, with the skulls and bones of three adults. Adjacent to one lair, the remains of the bottom board of an infant's coffin was found. This naturally resulted in speculation, based on Burns's well known extra-marital intimacy, on the real cause of Mary's death, but evidence was subsequently given that the child had died in 1827, and had also been buried in the Macpherson's plot. In a solemn ceremony on 13 November 1920 Mary's remains were re-interred in Greenock Cemetery under the 1842 monument designed by John Mossman, moved from the old West Kirkyard, which depicts the romantic couple, in memory of Robert Burns' lost love.

== Statues of Mary Campbell ==
In Dunoon, a statue of Highland Mary, sculptured by David Watson Stevenson, was erected in 1896. The statue is prominently sited on Castle Hill, near the local museum and on the remains of a 12th-century castle. The statue looks out over the Firth of Clyde - the somewhat forlorn figure apparently gazing in the direction of the Ayrshire Coast - the birthplace of her beloved Robert Burns. The statue is a scheduled monument (LB26437).

A Campaign for Nuclear Disarmament protest song about the arrival in the Holy Loch of the U.S. Navy USS Proteus (AS-19) nuclear submarine tender for the Polaris ballistic missile fleet was titled "Ding Dong Dollar", and said that when they arrived, "Bonnie Mary o Argyll; Wis wearin spangled drawers ablow her goun."

== See also ==
- Jean Armour
- Alison Begbie
- Isabella Burns
- May Cameron
- Jean Gardner
- Nelly Kilpatrick
- Agnes Maclehose
- Peggy Thompson
- Jenny Clow
- Ann Park
