= George Hotel, Dunoon =

Listed building in Argyll and Bute, Scotland

George Hotel
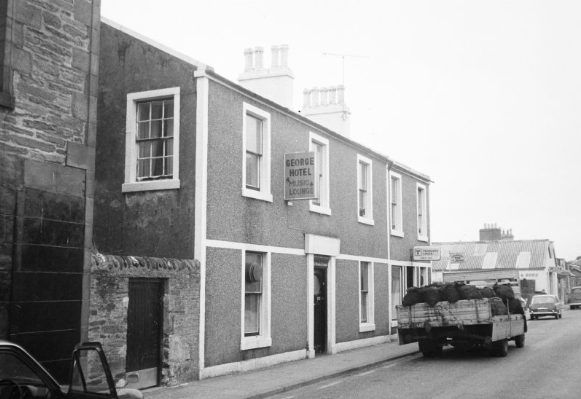
- The hotel around 1975. Tennent's sign in view above the pub entrance
- Interactive map of the George Hotel area

General information
- Location: 73 George Street, Dunoon, Argyll and Bute, Scotland
- Coordinates: 55.952074°N 4.924126°W
- Opening: c. 1800

Technical details
- Floor count: 2

Other information
- Number of bars: 1

The George Hotel was a hotel and bar formerly located at today's 73 George Street in Dunoon, Cowal, Argyll and Bute, Scotland. Now a private residence, it is a Category C listed building, built around 1800.

Built in the Georgian style, the building is two storeys in the main block, three bays wide. It has an in-line extension on the right side of the building, which is two bays wide. It has astragal chimneys on all three stacks.
