= Holy Trinity Church, Dunoon =

Holy Trinity Church
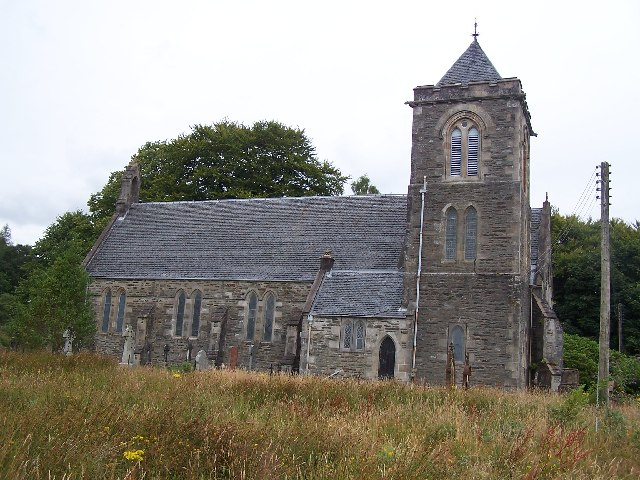
- The church in 2005
- Holy Trinity Church
- 55°56′46″N 4°56′23″W
- Location: Dunoon, Argyll and Bute
- Country: Scotland
- Denomination: Episcopalian
- Website: Official website

History
- Status: open
- Consecrated: 11 September 1850; 175 years ago

Architecture
- Functional status: used
- Heritage designation: Category B listed building
- Designated: 20 July 1971
- Architect: John Henderson
- Architectural type: Gothic Revival
- Groundbreaking: 1849
- Completed: 1850

Holy Trinity Church is an Episcopalian church building in Dunoon, Argyll and Bute, Scotland. It is located on Kilbride Road, southwest of the town centre. Constructed in the Gothic Revival style, it is a Category B listed building.

The church was built in 1850 by John Henderson. It was extended to the west in 1896 by Alexander Ross. Its bell was cast by John Warner & Sons.

== History ==
Starting in 1846, Revd. Henry George Pirie held services in a hall in the town centre, for local Scottish Episcopalians. Funds were then raised towards their own church building. Records of donations included £5 from William Gladstone who was later a British Prime Minister.

Once a site had been granted near the ancient Celtic St Bride well, a church design was commissioned. Edinburgh architect John Henderson was involved. The first stone was laid on 31 March 1849. The following September the Right Revd. Alexander Ewing, the new Bishop of Argyll, visited the church and opened it for worship. A pipe organ was purchased in 1882.

By the 1890s there was insufficient space for the summer congregations. Architect Alexander Ross, of Inverness, was involved in 1894. The nave was increased in size to the west. In the years that followed, further additions included a large western porch (narthex) and a tower and bells. The sanctuary was remodelled some time around 1950.

Electric lighting was fitted for Christmas 1944, with contributions from the naval personnel stationed nearby in Innellan. An electric organ replaced the pipe organ in the late 20th century.

In 2013, a significant conservation project was embarked upon, largely funded by Historic Scotland and the Heritage Lottery.

== Rectors ==
Holy Trinity Church has had twenty rectors in its history. Its two most recent rectors went on to become bishops: Andrew Swift in the Diocese of Brechin followed by David Railton in the Diocese of Argyll and the Isles.

== Graveyard ==
There are monuments to Alexander Reid, a notable figure in the history of Scottish art, and Sir Francis Powell, the Scottish watercolourist.

== Gallery ==
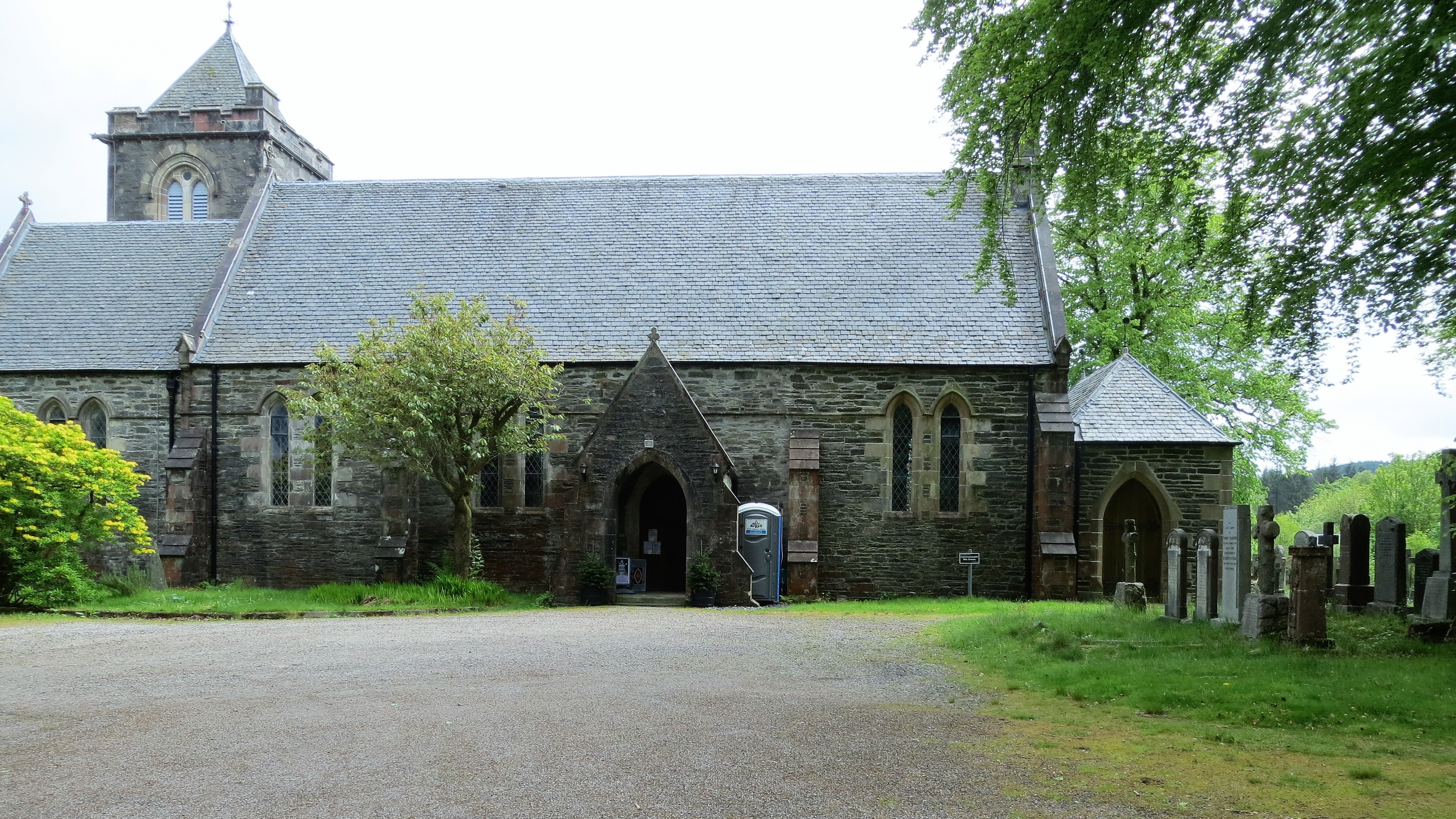
An entrance to the church, 2021

== See also ==
- List of listed buildings in Dunoon
