= Dunoon Observer and Argyllshire Standard =

- A front page from 6 November 2015
- Type: Weekly newspaper
- Format: Tabloid
- Owner(s): Argyll Media Ltd.
- Editor: Gorden Neish
- Founded: 25 March 1871; 154 years ago
- Headquarters: John Street, Dunoon, Scotland
- Circulation: 2,330 (as of 2023)
- Price: 80 pence
- Website: argyllbute24.co.uk

The Dunoon Observer and Argyllshire Standard is a weekly tabloid newspaper serving the Cowal Peninsula area of Argyll and Bute, in western Scotland. It is edited and printed in Dunoon, and is known locally as the Standard. The newspaper is owned by Argyll Media Ltd. It was published by E&R Inglis Ltd. until 2015, when the owners, Marion and John Carmichael, decided to retire. It had been in the Inglis family for 144 years.

== History ==
Founded on 25 March 1871 in nearby Sandbank by William Inglis, Sr, who was editor and proprietor, it moved to Dunoon for the first time in 1906. That year its printing was moved to Oban, where it was printed alongside The Oban Times. Printing returned to Dunoon in 1991. The newspaper currently has a circulation of around 5,500.

In 2015, upon the retirement of the Carmichaels, the newspaper was purchased by Argyll Media Ltd. The editorial offices remain in Dunoon.

In 2019 Argyll Media Ltd launched a second newspaper, The Isle of Bute News.

The current editor is Gordon Neish.
