= Dunoon =

Town in Argyll and Bute, Scotland

Coordinates: 55.9509°N 4.9262°W

Dunoon: Scottish Gaelic: Dùn Omhain
- Town
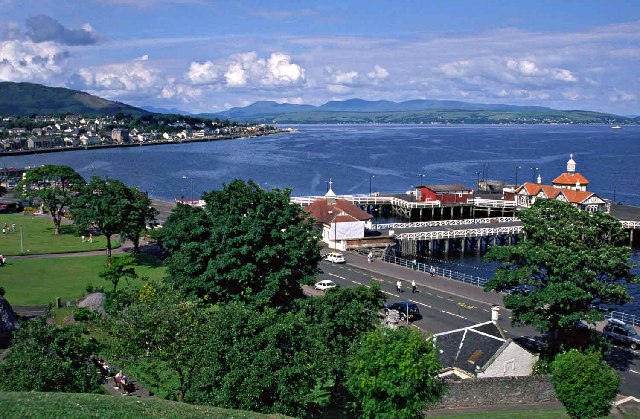
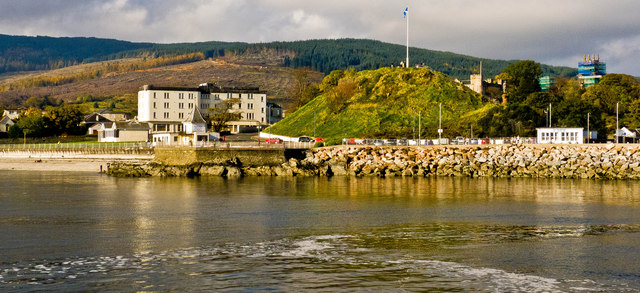
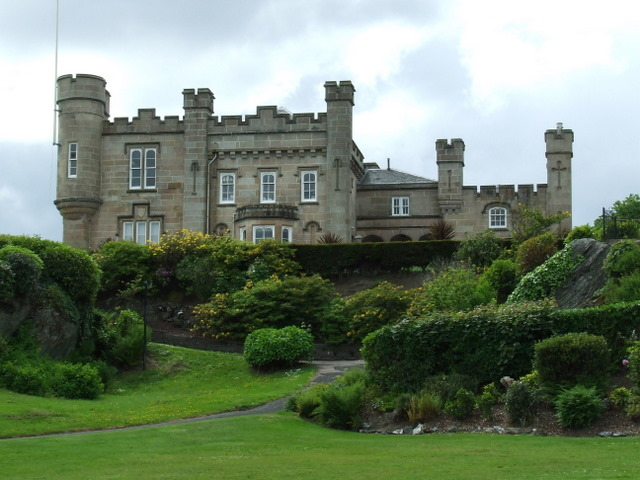
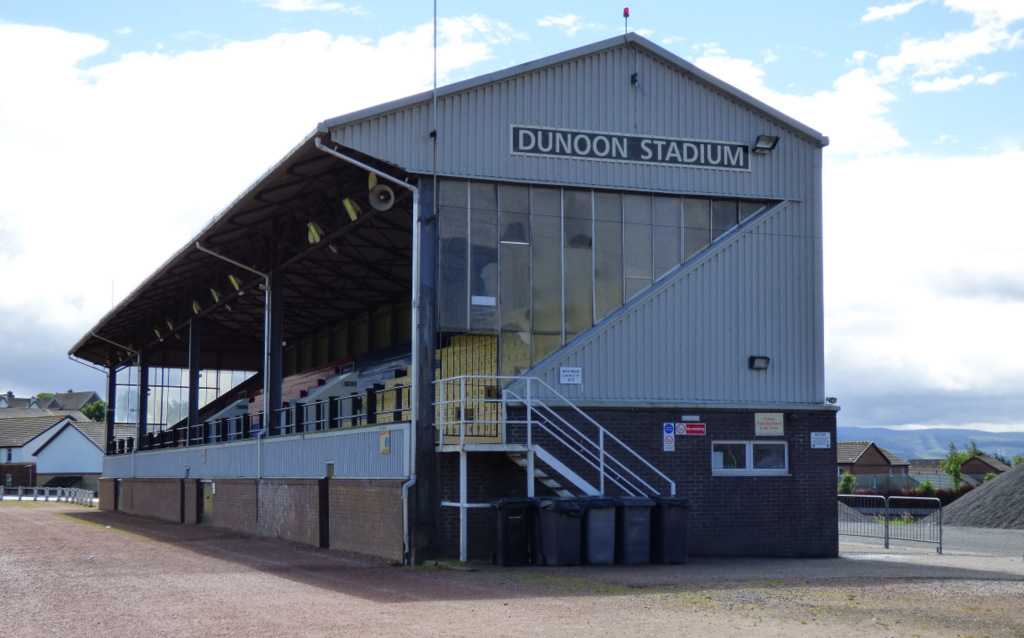
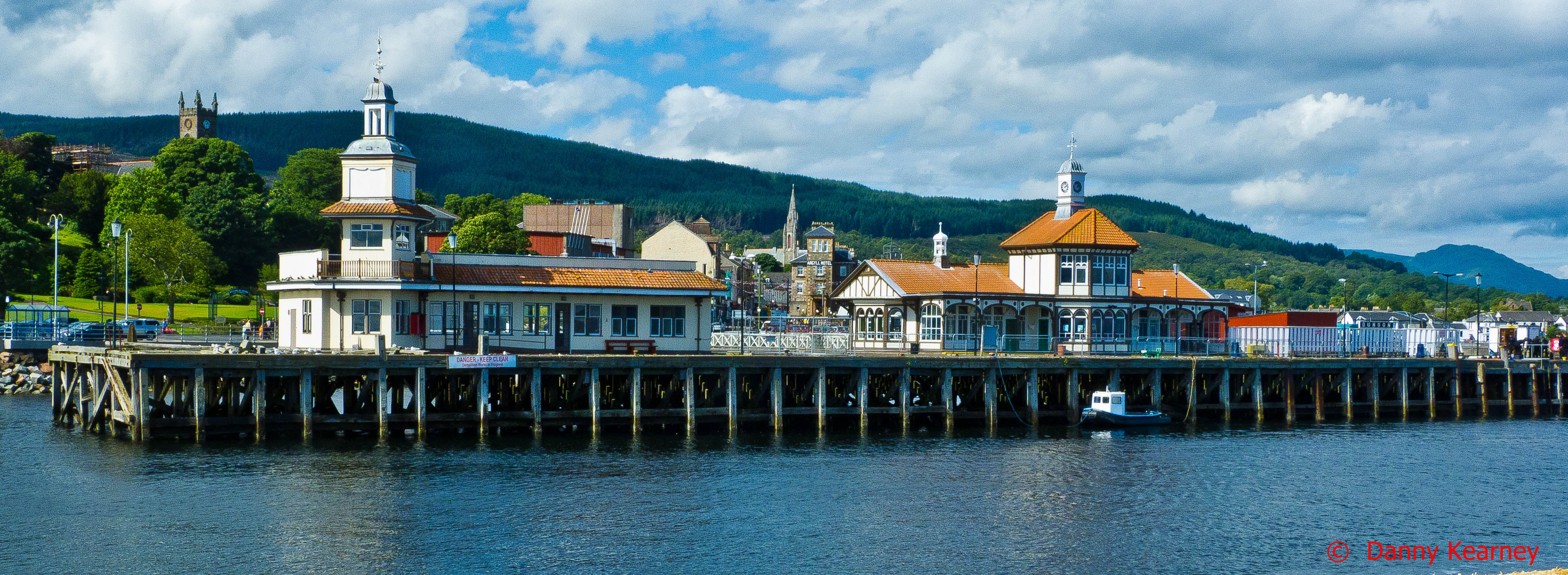
- Dunoon Pier and East Bay Castle Hill Castle House Dunoon Stadium Dunoon Pier

- Location within Argyll and Bute
- Population: 7,994 (2022)
- OS grid reference: NS173769
  - Edinburgh: 67 mi (108 km)
  - London: 364 mi (586 km)
- Council area: Argyll and Bute
- Lieutenancy area: Argyll and Bute
- Country: Scotland
- Sovereign state: United Kingdom
- Post town: DUNOON
- Postcode district: PA23
- Dialling code: 01369
- UK Parliament: Argyll, Bute and South Lochaber
- Scottish Parliament: Argyll and Bute

Dunoon (/dʌˈnuːn/; Scottish Gaelic: Dùn Omhain [t̪un ˈo.ɪɲ]) is the main town on the Cowal peninsula in Argyll and Bute, Scotland. It is located on the western shore of the upper Firth of Clyde, to the south of the Holy Loch and to the north of Innellan. The town had a population of 7,994 in 2022.

As well as forming part of the council area of Argyll and Bute, Dunoon also has its own community council. It was a burgh until 1976.

The early history of Dunoon often revolves around two feuding clans: the Lamonts and the Campbells. The town was a popular destination when travel by steamships was common around the Firth of Clyde; Glaswegians described this as going doon the watter. This diminished, and many holidaymakers started to go elsewhere as roads and railways improved and the popularity of overseas travel increased.

In 1961, during the height of the Cold War, Dunoon became a garrison town to the United States Navy. In 1992, shortly after the dissolution of the Soviet Union, they closed their Holy Loch base in Sandbank, and neighbouring Dunoon suffered an economic downturn. Since the base's closure, the town and surrounding area are again turning to tourism, marketing to outdoor enthusiasts and wildlife lovers, as well as promoting festivals and competitions. The largest annual event held in the town is the Cowal Highland Gathering, which has been held since 1894. The Royal National Mòd has also been held in the town.

== History ==
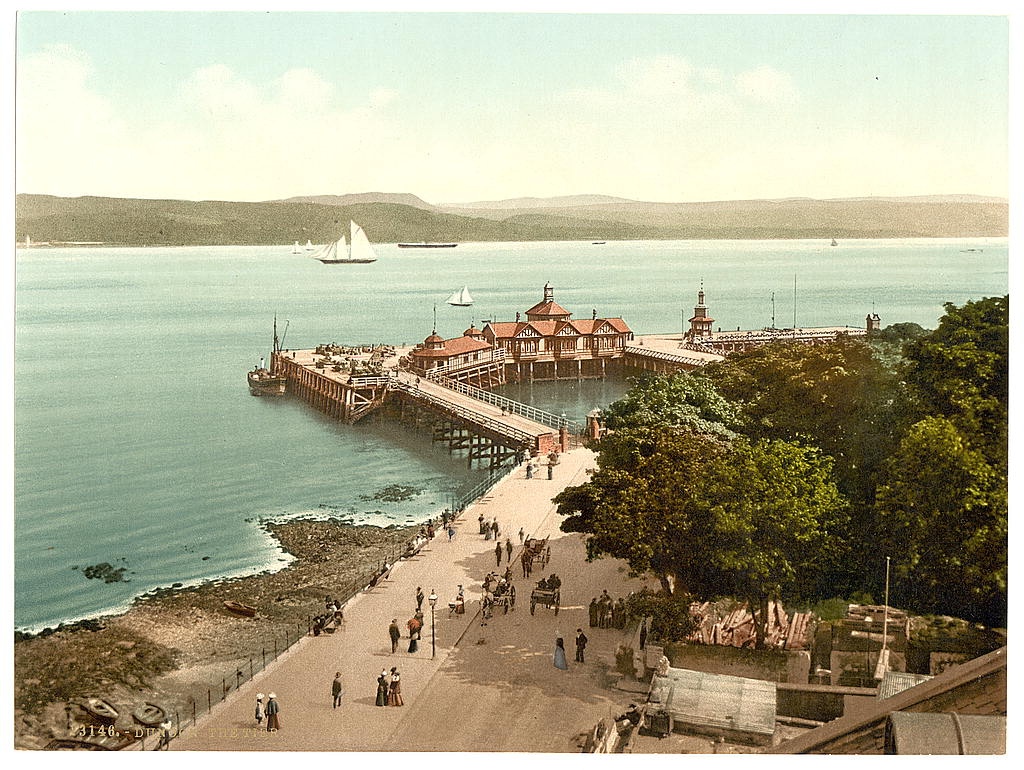
Dunoon Pier, looking southeast

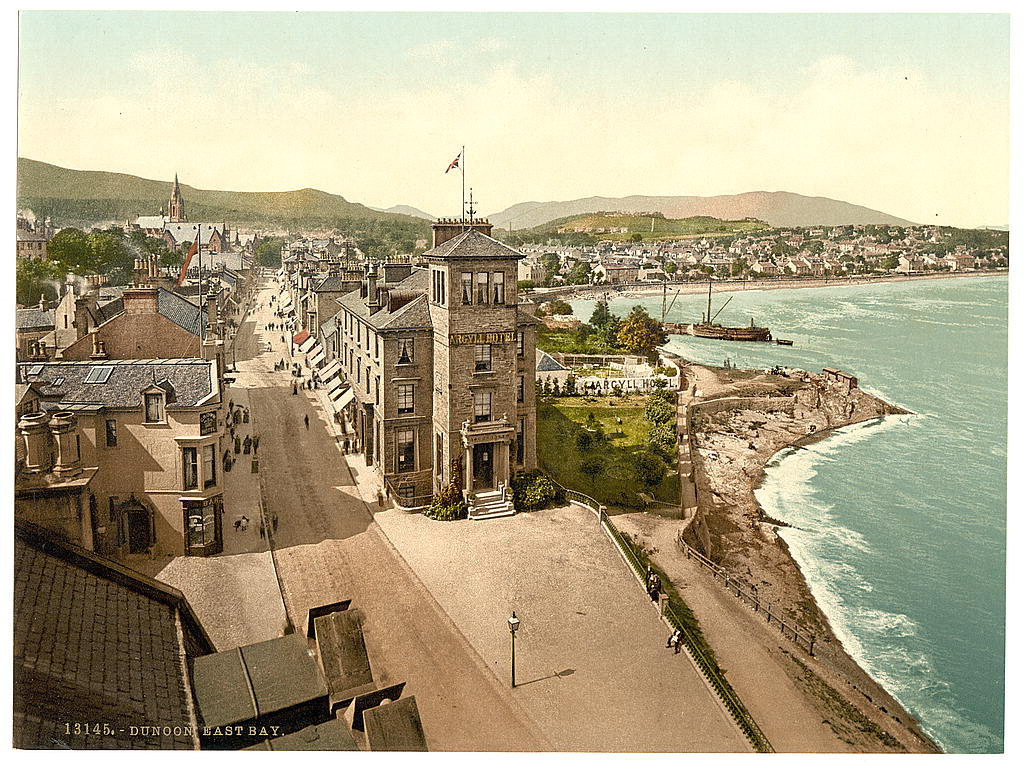
East Bay, looking north, including the Argyll Hotel

Dunoon Castle was built on a small, partly artificial, conical hill beside the Firth of Clyde in the 12th century, of which low walls remain. It eventually became a royal castle with the Earls of Argyll (Campbells) as hereditary keepers, paying a nominal rent of a single red rose to the sovereign. Mary, Queen of Scots, visited Dunoon Castle on 26 July 1563 and granted several charters during her visit. In 1646 the Dunoon massacre of members of Clan Lamont by members of Clan Campbell took place.

In the early 19th century, the town's main street, Argyll Street, stopped at Moir Street. Instead of continuing to Dunoon Pier, it turned right at today's Sinbad's Bar. Before Dunoon Burgh Hall was built, beginning in 1873, the land was an open field, owned by James MacArthur Moir, leading to an area known as the Gallowhill. There were no streets and houses between Argyll Street and Edward Street. Argyll Street, roughly as it is seen today, was completed by 1870. Moir donated some of his land for the building of the Burgh Hall, but he did not get to see its completion; he died by suicide in 1872.

Dunoon in the 21st century is overlaid with the ghost of a town which, in 1885, possessed two banks, 21 insurance agencies, 10 hotels, a gas company, two bowling greens, three weekly papers, the West of Scotland Convalescent Sea-side Homes (complete with Romanesque hydropathic spa) and the lavishly appointed second homes of some of Scotland's most successful people.

— Saving the Hall (Jay Merrick, 2017)

The two banks mentioned above were the Union Bank of Scotland and the City of Glasgow Bank. The hydropathic spa, meanwhile, was "an elegant new baths building, named Ardvullin, erected a little to the north of the village as a hydropathic establishment, where baths - hot, cold, artificial salt, and Turkish — may be had at moderate charges."

Many of the town's early villas had their own private bathing ground or boxes.

The best bathing place for ladies is the West Bay. Gentlemen's bathing places: Rocks, foot of Castle Hill, deep at all states of the tide. Sand: beyond Baugie Burn, beginning of Bullwood, shallow and sandy. Rocks: behind Argyll Hotel, available only at high water. Kirn Pier and Hunters Quay, deep water.

— Colegate's Guide to Dunoon, Kirn, and Hunter's Quay (John Colegate, 1868)

The population of the united parishes of Dunoon and Kilmun in 1861 was 5,444; in 1866 the estimated population of Dunoon, from Baugie Burn to Hunters Quay, was 3,000.

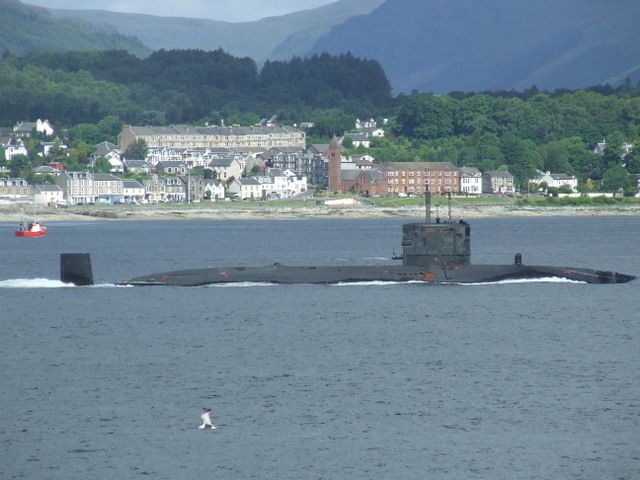
Submarine passing Kirn, viewed from Gourock

During the World Wars, as the main part of the Firth of Clyde defences, the Cloch Point-to-Dunoon anti-submarine boom was anchored to the shore in Dunoon below Castle Hill. A Palmerston Fort and camp at Ardhallow Battery in the south of the town provided one of the coastal defence gun emplacements that covered the anti-submarine boom and Firth of Clyde waters. There also was a gun emplacement atop Castle Hill.

In 1961, as the Cold War intensified, the Holy Loch's importance grew when the U.S. Navy submarine tender USS Proteus brought Polaris ballistic missiles, nuclear submarines to the Firth of Clyde at Sandbank. Campaign for Nuclear Disarmament protesters drew this to the public's attention. Holy Loch was, for thirty years, the home port of U.S. Navy Submarine Squadron 14 and Dunoon, therefore, became a garrison town.

In 1991, the Holy Loch base was deemed unnecessary following the demise of the Soviet Union and was subsequently withdrawn. The last submarine tender to be based there, the USS Simon Lake, left Holy Loch in March 1992, leading to a major and continuing downturn in the local economy.

In May 2012, Dunoon and Campbeltown were jointly named as the rural places in Scotland most vulnerable to a downturn in a report by the Scottish Agricultural College looking at ninety places.

== Government and politics ==
Dunoon is represented in the Scottish Parliament by Jenni Minto, of the Scottish National Party (SNP), who holds the Argyll and Bute seat. Dunoon also lies within the Highlands and Islands electoral region, from which a further seven additional members are elected to produce a form of proportional representation for the region as a whole.

In the House of Commons, Dunoon is represented by the SNP's Brendan O'Hara, who holds a seat also titled Argyll, Bute and South Lochaber, although this seat has different boundaries from the one used for the Scottish Parliament.

Argyll and Bute Council is the Local Authority for the council area covering Dunoon. It is one of 32 such council areas across Scotland. Dunoon forms a single ward for elections to Argyll and Bute Council, electing three councillors via the single transferable vote system. At the last election, held in May 2017, one independent and one member from each of the SNP and the Conservatives was elected to represent the town.

Dunoon has a community council, whose primary role is to represent the views of the community to the Local Authority and other public bodies.

== Religion ==
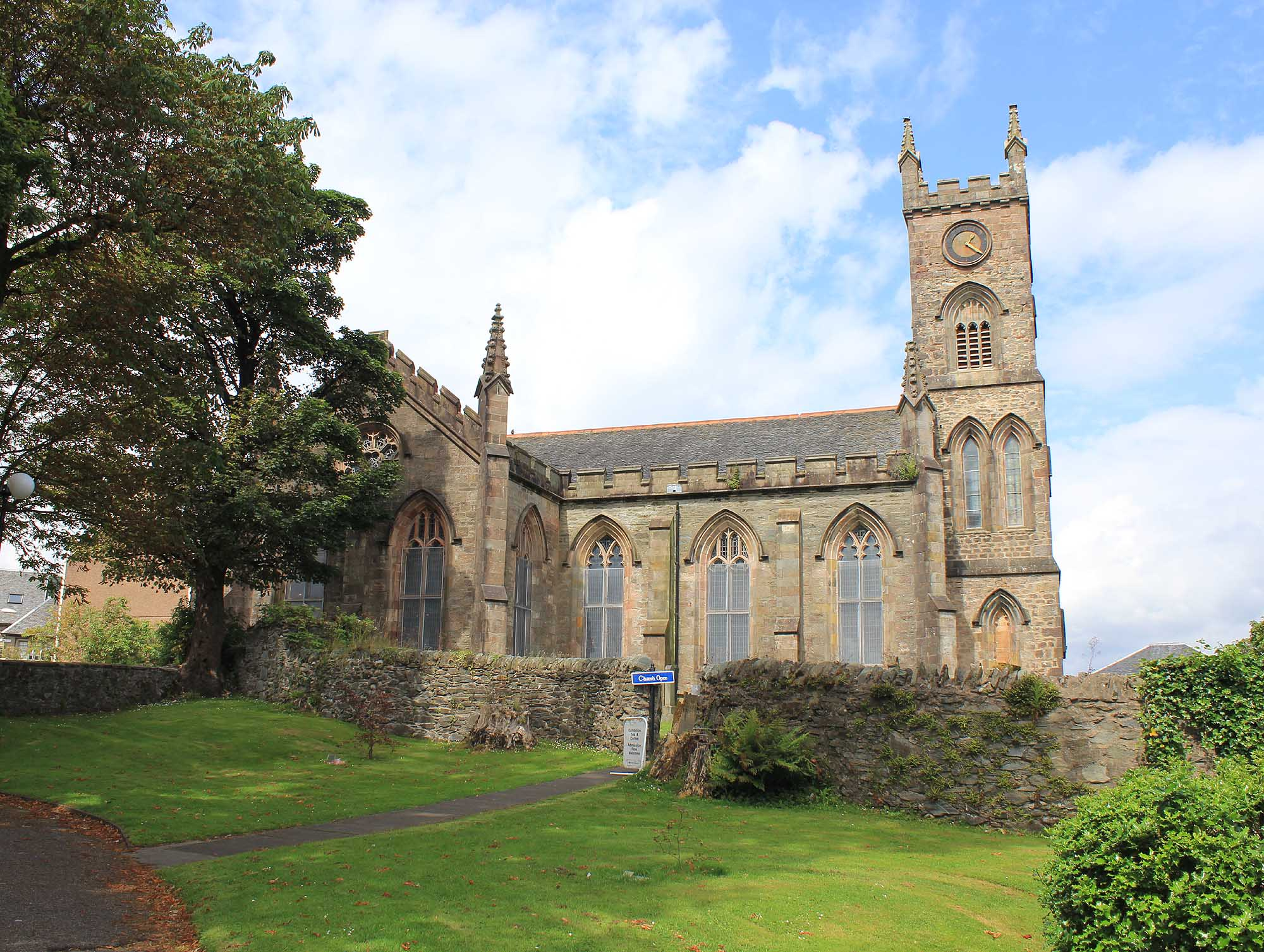
The High Kirk, built in 1816

There are a number of churches in Dunoon, including:

Church of Scotland: St John's Church

Roman Catholic: Our Lady and St Mun's Church

Other churches:

- Cowal Baptist Church
- Dunoon Baptist Church Centre
- Holy Trinity Episcopal Church
- Kingdom Hall of Jehovah's Witnesses

=== Historical ===
There is evidence of an episcopal seat at Dunoon from the latter part of the 15th century. No remains of the Bishop's Palace now exist, the site is now occupied by the playground of Dunoon Primary School, between Hillfoot Street and Kirk Street.

Defunct religious buildings

- High Kirk, closed 2023
- St Cuthbert's Church, demolished 1994
- Dunoon Free Church (built 1843), closed 2021

== Culture ==
=== Architecture ===
==== Dunoon Pier ====
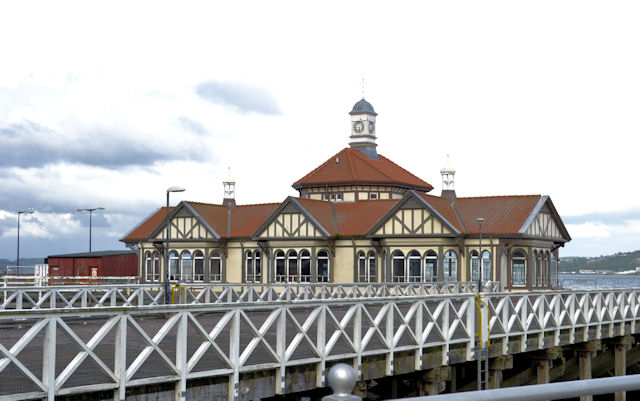
Dunoon Pier, pictured in 2011

Dunoon's Victorian pier was extended to the current structure between 1896 and 1898. It was shortened to allow the building of a breakwater in 2005, just to the south of the pier. As well as protecting the pier and its architecture from storm surges, a new link span was installed alongside the breakwater. This was to allow the berthing and loading of roll-on/roll-off ferries instead of the side-loading ferries that used to serve the pier. A tender to serve the new link-span between two interested parties, Caledonian MacBrayne and Western Ferries, came to nothing. Prior to June 2011, the pier was in daily use by Caledonian MacBrayne, who ran a regular foot passenger and car-ferry service to Gourock. However, after June 2011, a renewed tendering process produced a passenger-only ferry service (Argyll Ferries, owned by Caledonian MacBrayne) using the breakwater for berthing. On 1 September 2004, during the construction of the breakwater, the cargo vessel Jackie Moon (82 metres in length) ran aground on the breakwater, with six people on board. Since the breakwater became operational in June 2011, Argyll Ferries operate from this docking facility. The Waverley struck the breakwater on 26 June 2009, with some 700 people on board. The pier was partially refurbished by Argyll and Bute Council during 2015. Now containing meeting rooms, it is purely a tourist attraction.

==== Burgh Hall ====
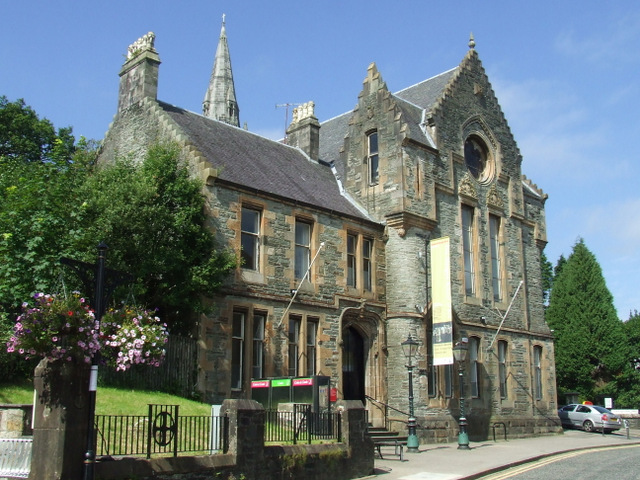
Dunoon Burgh Hall, 2012

Dunoon Burgh Hall opened in 1874, the work of notable Glasgow architect Robert Alexander Bryden, who is buried in Dunoon Cemetery, a mile to the north. It is a Scottish baronial-style building that housed the municipal offices and had a hall accommodating 500 people. The Category B listed building re-opened in June 2017, and is a fully accessible venue for exhibitions, performances and gatherings. Alongside a gallery and theatre, the venue offers creative workshop space, a garden and a café.

==== Other buildings ====
On 20 August 2021, several Argyll Street buildings were destroyed in an arson attack.

=== Landmarks and attractions ===
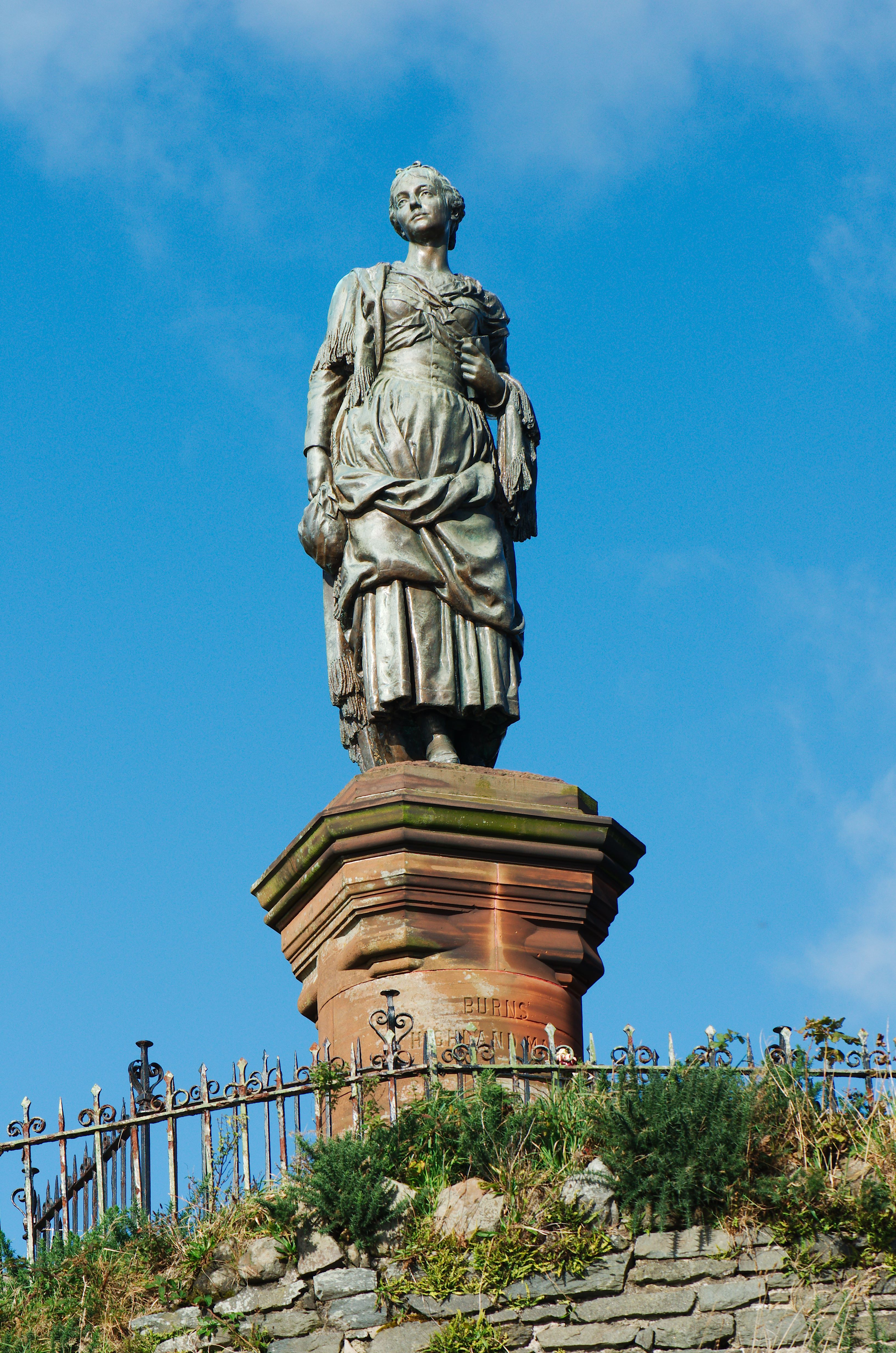
Highland Mary statue

Mary Campbell, also known as "Highland Mary" and "Bonny Mary O' Argyll", was born at Auchamore Farm in Dunoon. She had a relationship with the bard Robert Burns. The Highland Mary statue was erected in 1896; it is prominently sited on Castle Hill, overlooking the breakwater in Dunoon. The statue is a scheduled monument (LB26437).

The war memorial of Dunoon is located in the Castle Gardens, overlooking the pier.

The Queen's Hall is the town's major multi-function hall complex. It is situated opposite the head of the Victorian pier and built in 1958. It was officially opened by Queen Elizabeth II on 11 August 1958.

Riverside Swim and Health Centre, including an indoor pool (25m long) and associated facilities, located on Alexandra Parade.

Dunoon Library is situated in the rebuilt Queens Hall at the Castle Gardens.

A small group of rocks, known as the Gantocks, lie off the coast at Dunoon. The navigation beacon on the Gantocks in the Firth of Clyde is close to the coast at Dunoon. It was built in 1886.

The Clan Lamont Memorial, also known as the Dunoon Massacre Memorial, is on Tom-A-Mhoid Road close to Castle Hill. It was dedicated in 1906 and commemorates the Dunoon massacre of 1646, when the Campbell Clan attacked the Lamont Clan, killing over 200 people.

Local wildlife includes seals, otters, dolphins, basking sharks, roe deer, red deer, red squirrels, and many species of birds.

The Castle House Museum opens during the summer season. It holds historical information and displays for Dunoon and the Cowal peninsula.

=== Festivals ===
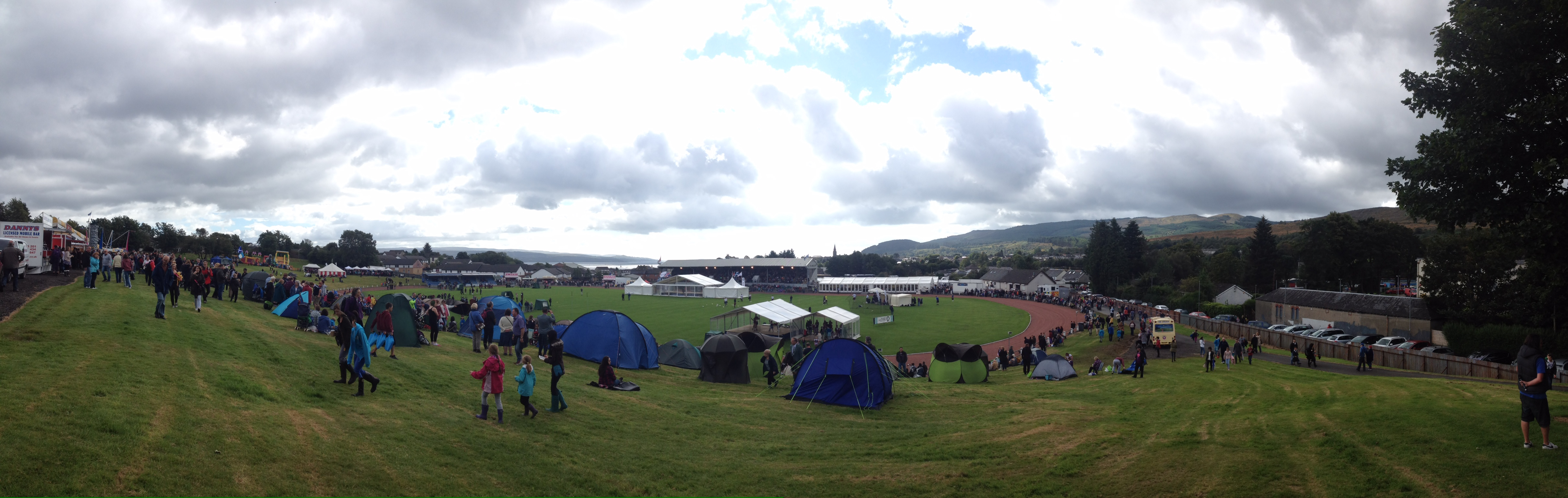
Panoramic view of the 2014 Cowal Highland Gathering

The Cowal Highland Gathering, established in 1894, attracts contestants and spectators from all over the world. It is held annually over the final weekend in August at Dunoon Stadium.

Cowal Open Studios, held over a fortnight in September, gives the opportunity to visit the studios of artists around Dunoon and Cowal.

Cowalfest celebrates the outdoors activities like rambling around Dunoon for ten days in October.

Since the 1930s Dunoon has hosted the Royal National Mòd a number of times – 1930, 1950, 1968, 1994, 2000, 2006, 2012 and 2018.

In 2013, the first Dunoon Film Festival was held over three days and opened with first public screening of Your Cheatin' Heart, a series made by the BBC that had last been shown on television in 1990.

== Transport ==
Dunoon is accessible by direct land and sea routes and indirectly by rail at Gourock.

=== Road ===
Dunoon lies towards the southern end of the A815 road. At its northernmost point, near Cairndow, this road joins the A83 and provides access to the town by road from Loch Lomond / Glasgow in the east, from Inveraray / Oban in the north and from Campbeltown in the west.

=== Ferry ===
Two ferry operators provide services to Dunoon from Gourock:

Caledonian MacBrayne

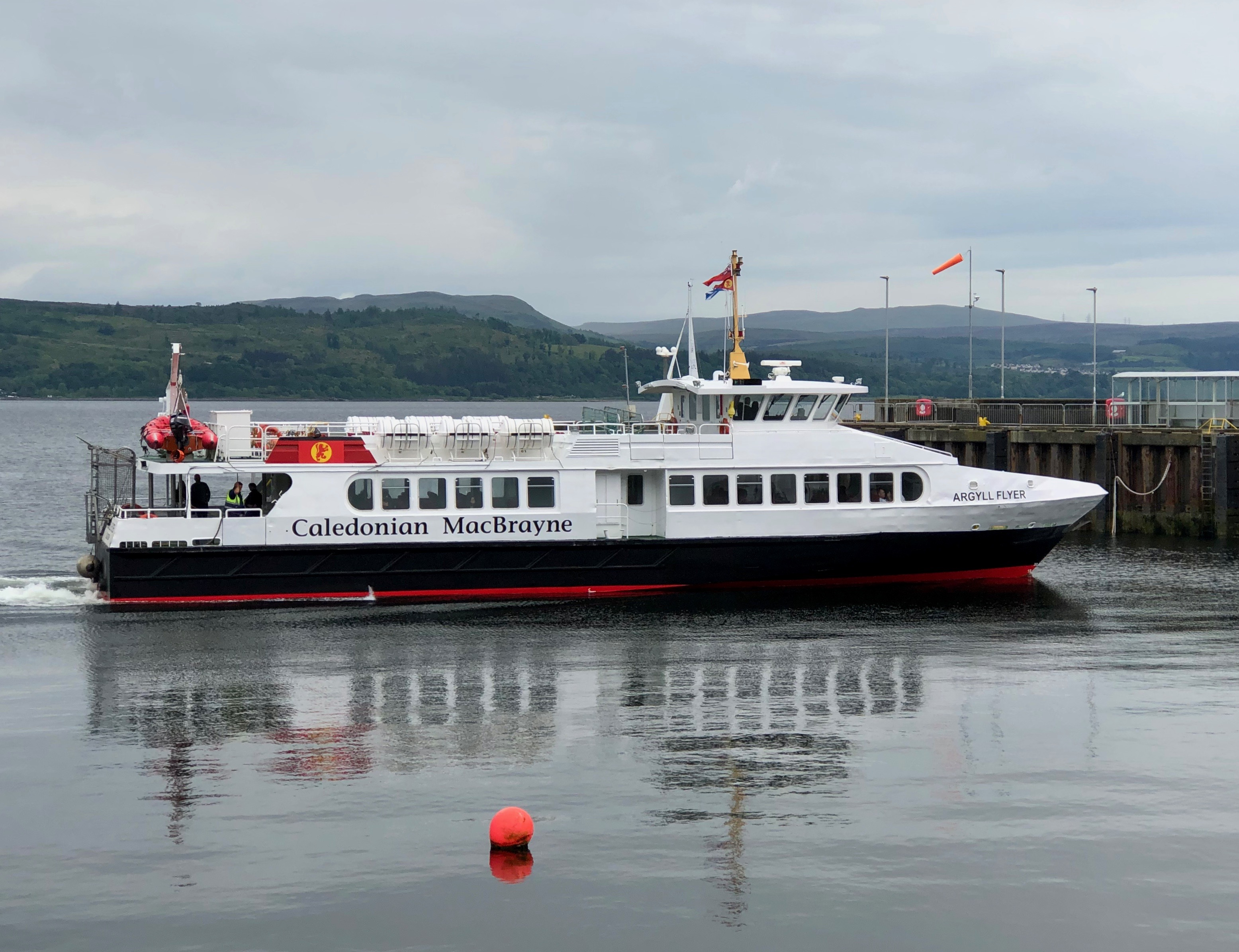
Argyll Flyer in the current CalMac livery, approaching Dunoon Pier

The public service route provided by the Scottish Government owned Caledonian MacBrayne, which is a foot-passenger-only service between Dunoon Breakwater and Gourock pier, giving easy access to the National Rail Network.

Preceding station	Ferry	Following station
Terminus	Caledonian MacBrayne; Ferry	Gourock

Western Ferries

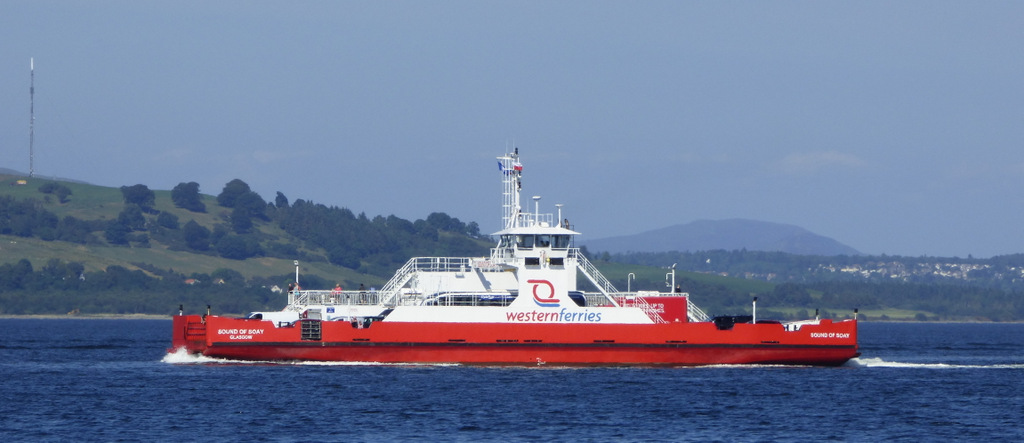
One of Western Ferries current fleet MV Sound of Soay

Local company Western Ferries (Clyde) LTD, carries motor vehicles and foot passengers between Hunters Quay near Dunoon and McInroy's Point on the A770, (Cloch Road).

Preceding station	Ferry	Following station
Terminus	Western Ferries; Ferry	McInroy's Point

Travel connections

For foot passengers at Gourock Pier, a ScotRail train service provides access to the National Rail network at Glasgow Central, via the local service Inverclyde Line.

=== Bus ===
Public transport within Dunoon and the surrounding area is provided under government subsidy by bus and coach operator West Coast Motors.

West Coast Motors' route 486 provides a regular return journey from Dunoon town centre to Inveraray, where it connects with a Scottish Citylink service 926 and 976 onward to Campbeltown, Oban, Glasgow and points in-between. Route 478 runs from Dunoon Pier to Portavadie six days a week.

=== Historical ===
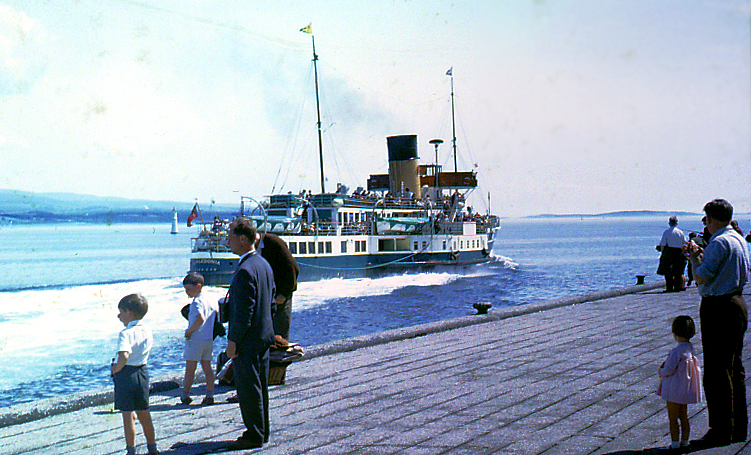
The steamboat Caledonia departing Dunoon Pier in 1967

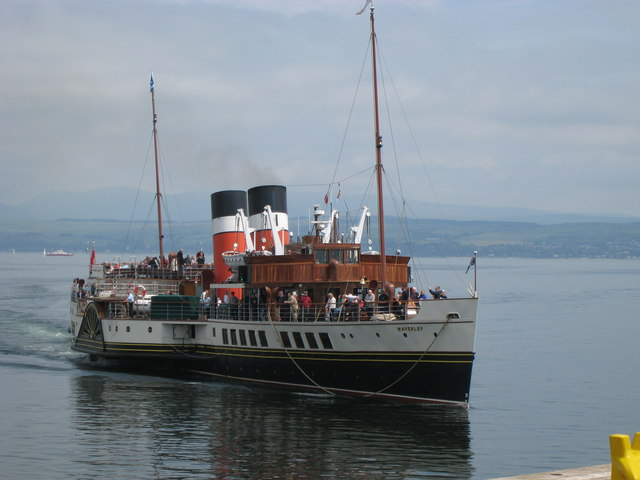
The paddle steamer Waverley arriving at Dunoon Pier

Modern Dunoon owes its existence to steam power; as late as 1822 there were only three or four slated houses, the rest of the residences being traditional Highland cottages. In the New Statistical Account, the MP James Ewing from Glasgow is named as beginning the expansion of the village when he built Castle House close to Dunoon Castle. The growth of the village increased from that time, paralleling the engineering-led growth of the steamers. Other infrastructural advances also helped like the construction of a 130-yard-long (120-metre) jetty in 1835. From 1812 to the late 1960s, thousands of holiday-makers travelled doon the watter from Glasgow and industrial Lanarkshire to Dunoon and to numerous other town piers on the Firth of Clyde.

In 1868, the following summer excursions by water could be had from Dunoon (going and returning the same day):

- Ardentinny, Chancellor, 11 A.M.
- Ardrishaig, Iona, 9.30 A.M.
- Arran, Hero, 10.30 A.M.
- Arrochar, Chancellor, 11 A.M.
- Ayr, Vale of Clyde, 9.15 A.M.
- Blairmore, Chancellor, 11 A.M.
- Brodick, Hero, 10.30 A.M.
- Campbeltown, Gael, 9.15 A.M.
- Carradale, Gael, 9.15 A.M.
- Fairlie, Vale of Clyde, 9.15 A.M.
- Gareloch, early steamer to Greenock, thence per Garelochhead steamer
- Innellan, various during the day
- Kyles of Bute, to Tighnabruaich or Colintraive, Iona; Kilchattan Bay, Bute, Hero
- Lamlash, Hero, 10.30 A.M.
- Largs, Vale of Clyde, or early steamer to Innellan, thence cross by Wemyss Bay Railway Steamer to Wemyss Bay
- Lochgoil, Chancellor and Lochlong; change at Blairmore
- Loch Lomond, Chancellor or early steamer to Bowling, thence by rail to Balloch, thence by steamer to Tarbert, where cross to Arrochar, and catch Chancellor returning, or vice-versa
- Loch Long, Chancellor
- Millport, Vale of Clyde, 9.15 A.M.
- Rothesay, various during the day
- Tarbert, Iona
- Troon, Vale of Clyde
- Wemyss Bay, steamer to Innellan, thence cross by Wemyss Bay Railway Steamer to Wemyss Bay

Only one Clyde steamer, the Waverley, satisfies demand for this business today. It berths at the breakwater when visiting Dunoon during its summer season.

== Education ==
Dunoon is served by three primary schools. Dunoon Primary School is on Hillfoot Street; this building was the original 1641 location of Dunoon Grammar School (it is now on Ardenslate Road in Kirn). St Muns Primary School is on Pilot Street and Kirn Primary School is on Park Road.

The University of the Highlands and Islands' Argyll College has a campus in Dunoon, located in the West Bay, near the breakwater and Castle Hill.

== Sport and recreation ==
=== National Cycle Route 75 ===
Dunoon is on the NCR75 a route from Edinburgh to Tarbert on the Kintyre peninsula. The National Cycle Network is maintained by sustrans.

=== Dunoon Stadium ===
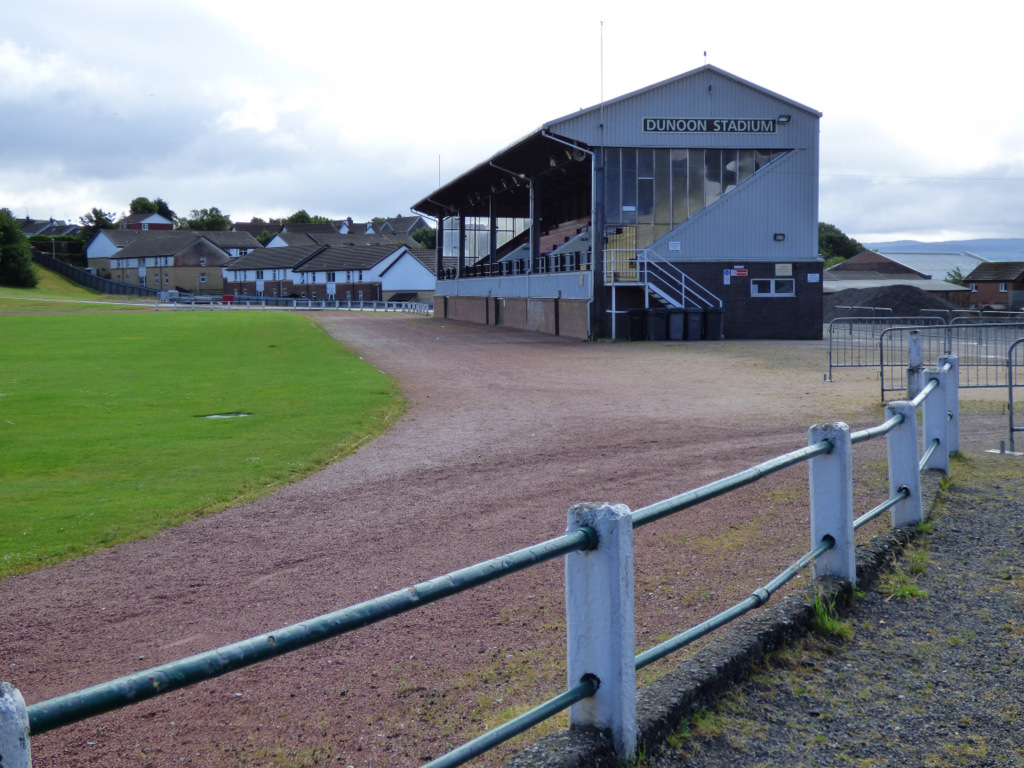
Dunoon Stadium, pictured in 2019, looking southeast towards the town

The town's sporting arena is Dunoon Stadium, which is located in the north of the town on Argyll Street. When it hosted football matches, it had the largest capacity of any amateur ground in Scotland. It later became the focal point of the Cowal Highland Gathering. Motorcycle dirt track racing (or speedway) was staged at the stadium on 18 June 1932 as part of the annual Dunoon and Cowal Agricultural Show. A demonstration event had been staged in May 1932.

The Dunoon Youth Football League (DYFL), founded in 1981, is a voluntary organisation that teaches football skills to all interested children with ages between 4 and 17. The DYFL have their own clubhouse and changing facilities at Dunoon Stadium. All coaches are parents who have received coaching certification through the Scottish Youth Football Association (SYFA), and the club has a PGA officer and coaches with Sports Injuries First Aid certification.

Cowal Rugby Club was formed in 1976. In 2008 it scored its first league victory in the Scottish Hydro Electric Western Regional League West Division 2.

Dunoon Amateurs F.C. was founded in 1975 and play football at Dunoon Stadium and Dunoon Grammar School.

Dunoon Camanachd was established in 2015; the shinty team started competing in South Division 2, in 2016.

Cowal Golf Club is situated on the hillside above Kirn. Founded in October 1891, initially as a nine-hole course designed by Willie Campbell from Bridge of Weir. It was formerly an eighteen-hole course, reconstructed by James Braid between 1924 and 1928. The current clubhouse was built in 1996. Due to financial issues, club assets were sold off in 2020. The golf club is still trading, although as a result of a land sale the course is now only a twelve-hole course. The club is now owned by "Cowal Golf and Lodge Resort Ltd.

The two bowling clubs in Dunoon are Dunoon–Argyll Bowling Club, on Mary Street, and Bogleha' Bowling Club, on Argyll Street. They are two of the 21 members of Bowls Scotland's District 26.

In 2006 and 2007, the town hosted a six-a-side swamp football tournament that attracted around 500 players and 1,000 spectators.

Castle Tennis Club is situated in the town's Castle Garden. The club has two concrete and two all-weather courts, all lighted.

Every year in June, the town hosts the Argyll Rally, a motorsport event that takes place on closed public roads around the local area. The rally counts as a round of the Scottish Rally Championship and brings competitors from all over United Kingdom.

=== Walks ===
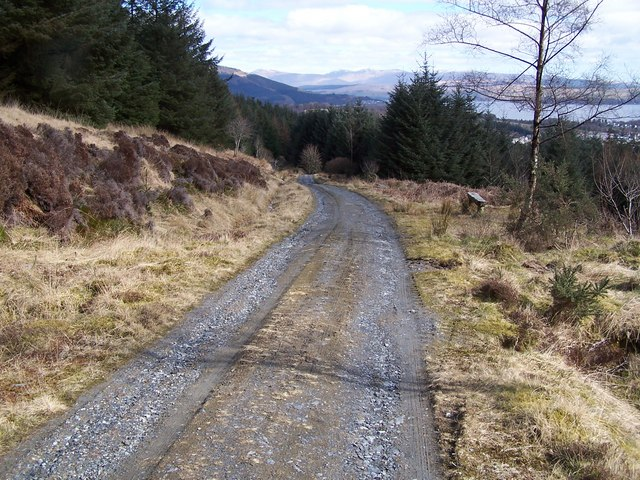
Tom Odhar summit, Bishop's Glen track

Trails (walks, running and mountain biking) thread through the hills surrounding Dunoon. Corlarach Hill has waymarked routes for walkers, mountain biking and horse riders. These trails are located next to the Bishop's Glen.

Puck's Glen is a popular short walk set in the hills close to Benmore Botanic Garden. (The arboretum at Benmore Botanic Garden, formerly a private garden for the Younger family, is now open to the public. It comprises 60 hectares (150 acres) and features some of the tallest trees in Britain, including the avenue of Giant Redwoods (Sequoia), some of which are over 37 metres (120 ft) high. One of Dunoon's listed buildings is the Grade 2 Victorian fernery, which was reopened in 2009 after an 18-month restoration.) Part of the Royal Botanic Garden Edinburgh, the Garden is 7 miles (11 kilometres) north of the town, just before Loch Eck. A tumbling burn, criss-crossed by bridges, is enclosed by rocky walls heavily hung with mosses and overshadowed by dense trees. The walk has clear, waymarked paths. The glen is named after Puck, from A Midsummer Night's Dream.

Morag's Fairy Glen is a short gorge walk, with trails alongside the Berry Burn, located on the hill behind the West Bay area of Dunoon.

The Bishop's Glen Reservoir trail follows the shore of the remaining one of three reservoirs in the glen, that used to supply fresh water to Dunoon. The reservoir is damming the Balgaidgh Burn (Balgie) and is now a freshwater fly fishing location. Access to the hills behind Dunoon, including Corlarach Hill, is available from the Bishop's Glen Reservoir trail.

== Media ==
Dunoon's local weekly newspaper is the Dunoon Observer and Argyllshire Standard, which was founded in 1871 in Sandbank by editor and proprietor William Inglis Sr. (The town once had three other newspapers, namely the Cowal Watchman (1876), Dunoon Herald and Cowal Advertiser and the Dunoon Telegraph.)

Dunoon Community Radio was launched in 2009. Broadcasting on 97.4 FM from the Dunoon Observer building, it is an independent social business entirely staffed by volunteers.

== Notable people ==
- Virginia Bottomley, politician
- Robert Alexander Bryden, architect, educated in Dunoon
- Mary Campbell, love interest of Robert Burns
- MT Carney, businesswoman
- Donald Caskie, minister, educated in Dunoon
- Peter Dorschel, spy, tried for espionage in Dunoon
- William Fraser, architect, lived in Dunoon
- Stewart Houston, footballer, born in Dunoon
- Sir Harry Lauder (1870–1950), whose Laudervale mansion stood just south of Dunoon on Bullwood Road
- Neil MacFarlane, footballer, born in Dunoon
- Mackintosh MacKay, minister in Dunoon and Gaelic scholar
- Sylvester McCoy, actor
- Alexander Robertson, boatbuilder operating from boatyard near Dunoon
- George Robertson, politician, educated in Dunoon
- Arabella Scott, suffragette, born in Dunoon
- Muriel Scott, suffragette, family home was in Dunoon
- John Smith, politician, educated in Dunoon
- Neil Warnock, football manager
- Brian Wilson, politician

== Gallery ==
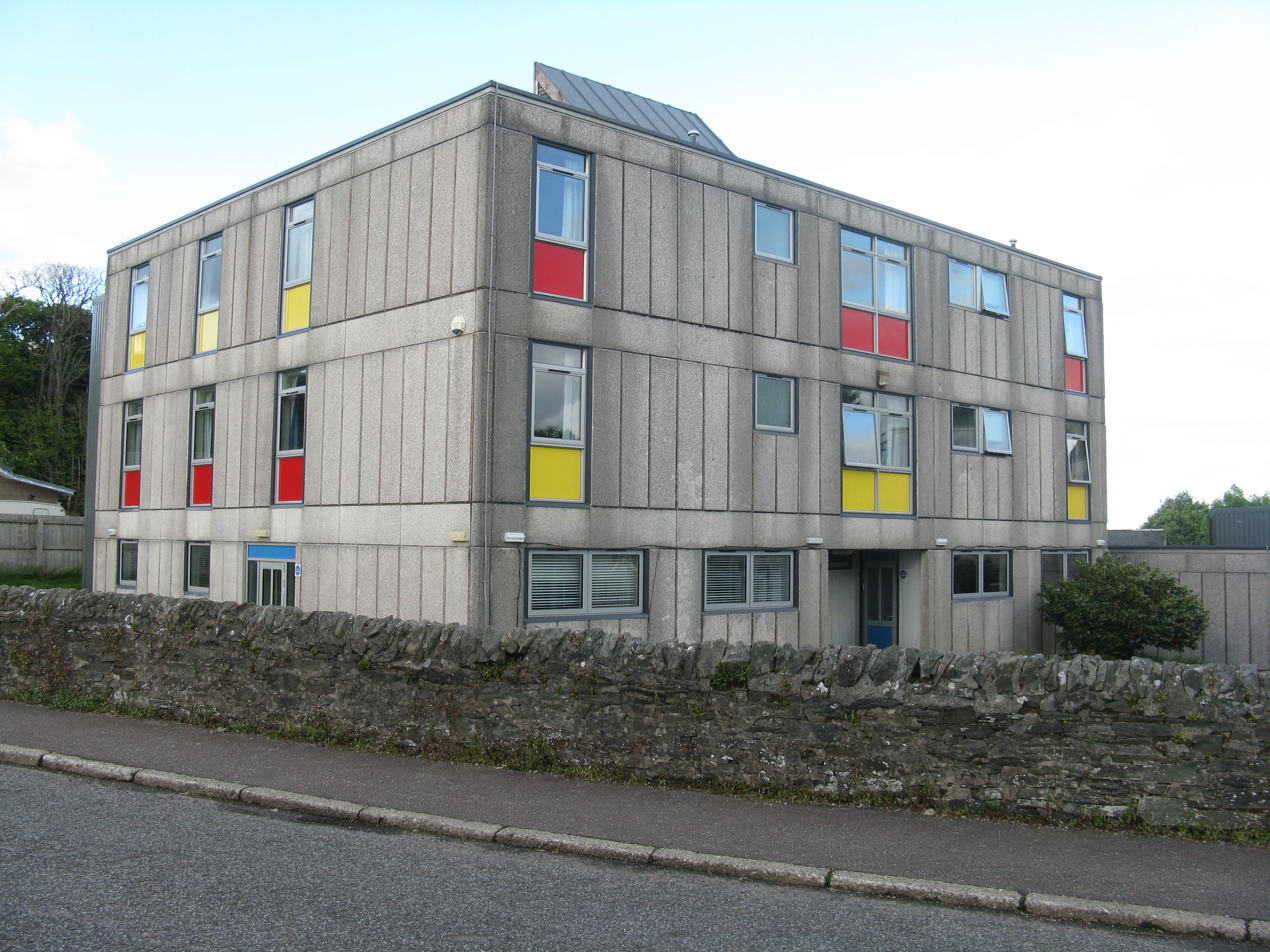
Dunoon Grammar School Hostel

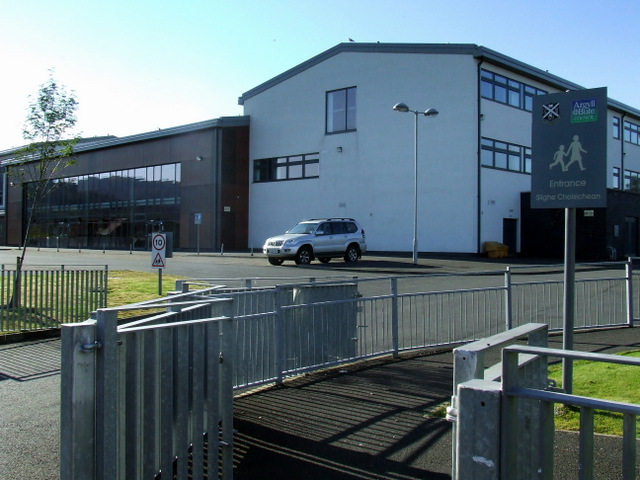
Entrance to Dunoon Grammar School

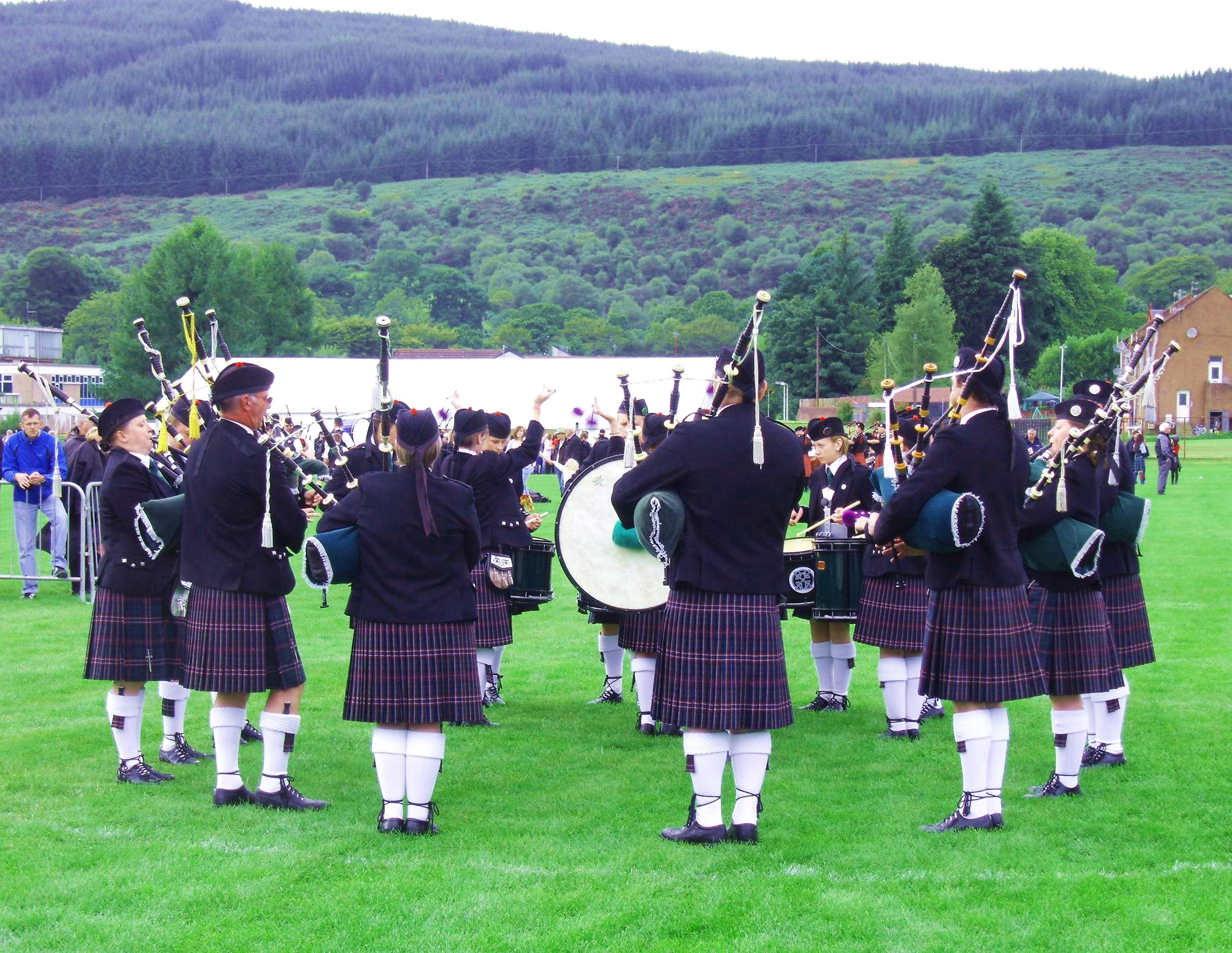
Pipe band at the Cowal Highland Gathering

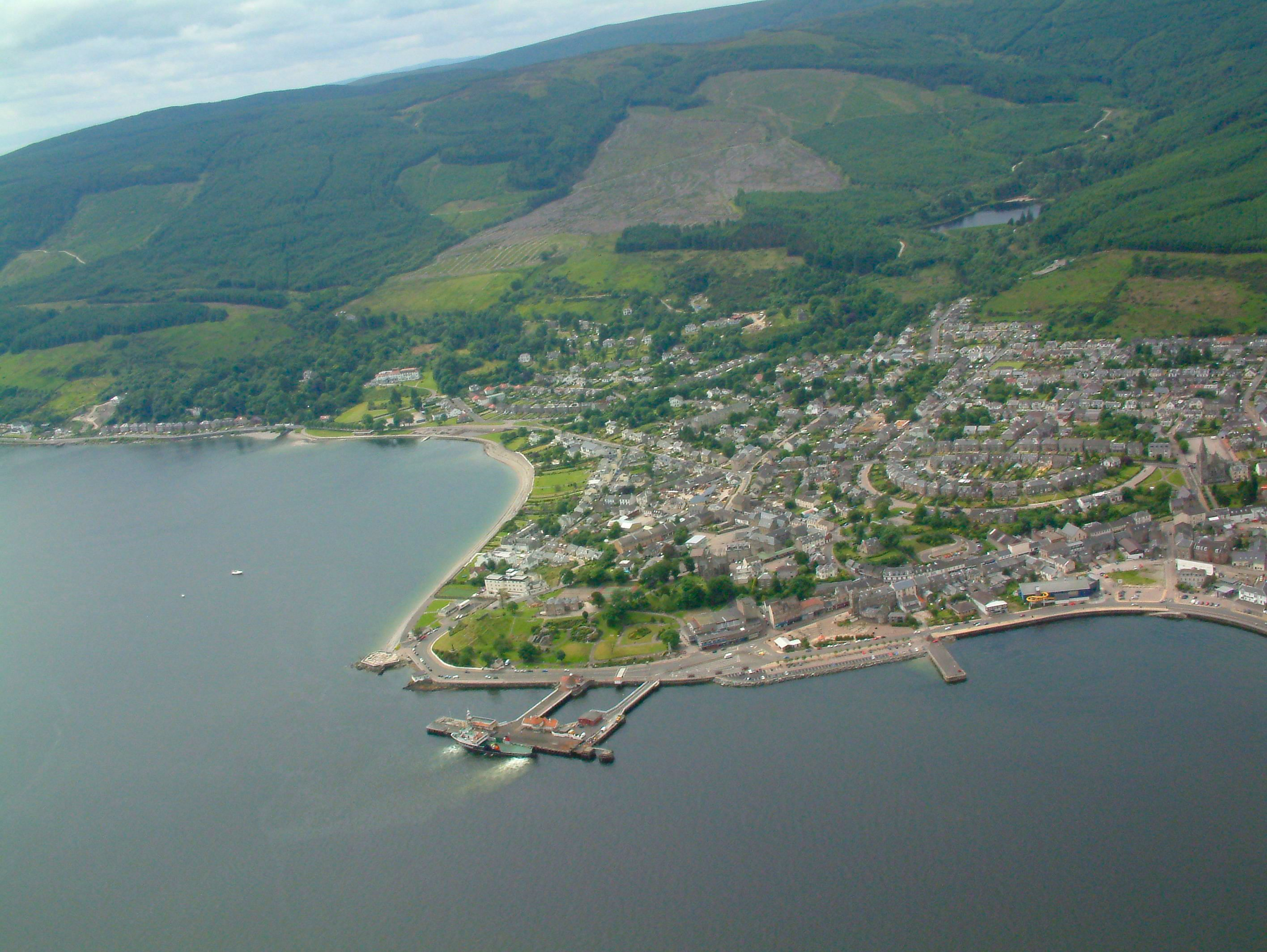
Dunoon from above the Firth of Clyde, looking west

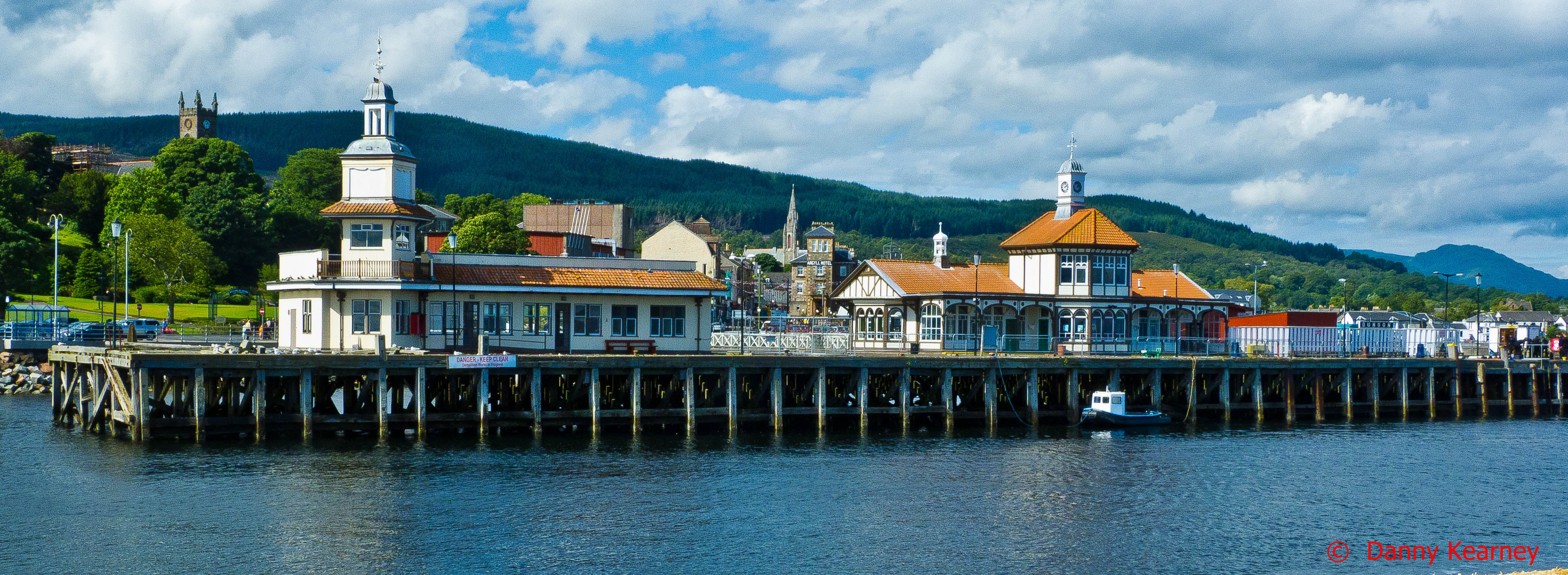
The eastern side of Dunoon Pier

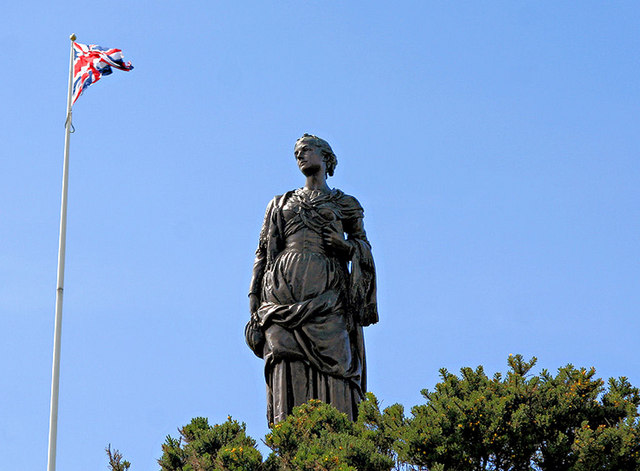
Highland Mary statue

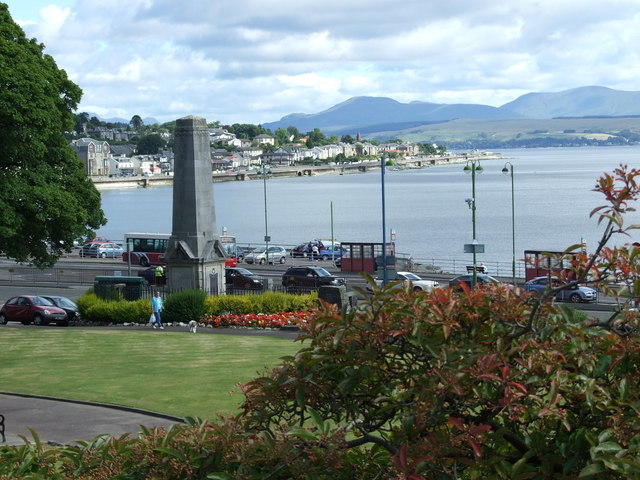
Castle House Gardens and war memorial, looking northeast to East Bay

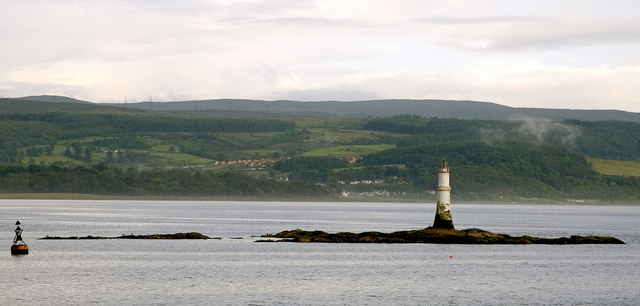
The Gantocks from Dunoon, with Inverkip in the background to the east

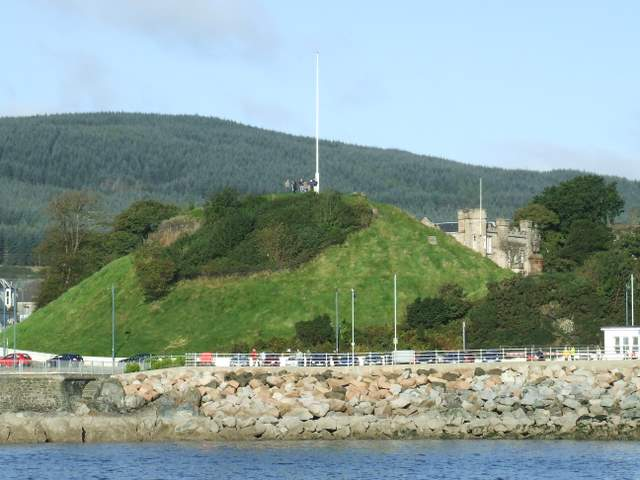
Castle Hill, looking west

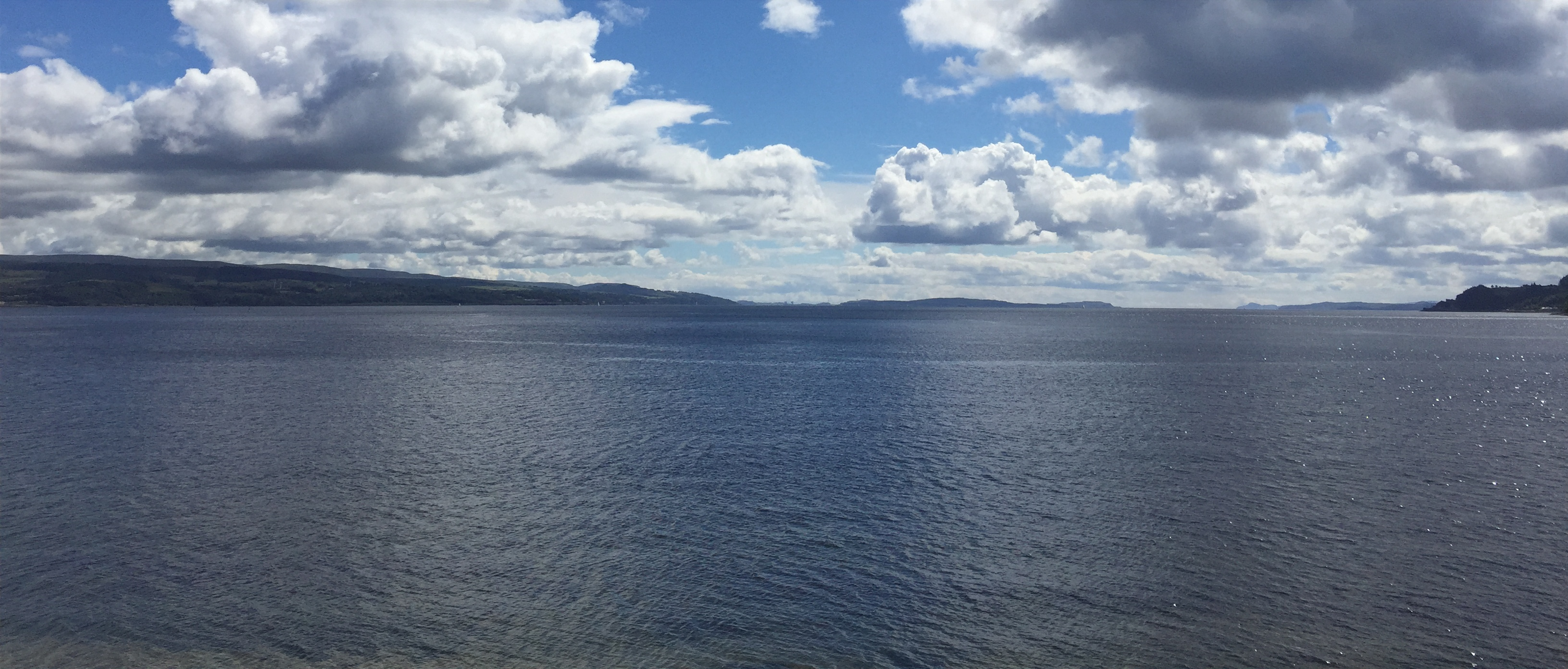
Firth of Clyde, from West Bay, Dunoon, Cowal, Argyll and Bute

== Geography ==
Dunoon is on the west coast of the upper Firth of Clyde, and on the east coast of the claw-shaped Cowal peninsula.

Much of the Cowal peninsula is covered with forest, particularly in the northern stretches and to the west and south with small patches in the south-east and east. To the north and north-west is the Argyll Forest Park that was established in 1935.

=== Climate ===
As with the rest of the British Isles, Dunoon has a maritime climate with cool summers and mild winters. It is an exceptionally wet part of the country, particularly so for a place near sea-level, with annual average rainfall totals nearing 2,400 mm (94 in).

Recorded temperature extremes since 1960 range from 29.6 °C (85.3 °F) during July 1983 to as low as −13.9 °C (7.0 °F) during January 1982.

Climate data for Benmore Botanic Gardens 12m asl, 1971–2000, extremes 1960– (Weather station 7 mi (11 km) to the North of Dunoon)
Month	Jan	Feb	Mar	Apr	May	Jun	Jul	Aug	Sep	Oct	Nov	Dec	Year
Record high °C (°F)	14.4 (57.9)	14.5 (58.1)	17.2 (63.0)	23.6 (74.5)	27.0 (80.6)	28.9 (84.0)	29.6 (85.3)	29.0 (84.2)	25.1 (77.2)	21.7 (71.1)	16.5 (61.7)	14.2 (57.6)	29.6 (85.3)
Mean daily maximum °C (°F)	6.5 (43.7)	6.8 (44.2)	8.6 (47.5)	11.4 (52.5)	14.9 (58.8)	16.8 (62.2)	18.4 (65.1)	18.0 (64.4)	15.3 (59.5)	12.2 (54.0)	8.9 (48.0)	7.2 (45.0)	12.1 (53.8)
Mean daily minimum °C (°F)	1.0 (33.8)	1.3 (34.3)	2.2 (36.0)	3.4 (38.1)	5.8 (42.4)	8.5 (47.3)	10.7 (51.3)	10.4 (50.7)	8.6 (47.5)	6.1 (43.0)	2.9 (37.2)	1.7 (35.1)	5.2 (41.4)
Record low °C (°F)	−13.9 (7.0)	−11.1 (12.0)	−11.1 (12.0)	−4.4 (24.1)	−2.5 (27.5)	−0.6 (30.9)	2.2 (36.0)	2.6 (36.7)	−0.9 (30.4)	−4.1 (24.6)	−6.8 (19.8)	−11.5 (11.3)	−13.9 (7.0)
Average precipitation mm (inches)	298.76 (11.76)	214.43 (8.44)	233.63 (9.20)	119.48 (4.70)	105.12 (4.14)	108.54 (4.27)	127.66 (5.03)	160.85 (6.33)	220.49 (8.68)	257.6 (10.14)	257.82 (10.15)	282.98 (11.14)	2,387.36 (93.98)
Source: Royal Dutch Meteorological Institute

== Demography ==
=== Population ===
The population of Dunoon at the 2022 Scottish census was 7,994 inhabitants, making it the largest settlement on the Cowel peninsula.

== See also ==
- List of places in Argyll and Bute
