= Argyll Hotel, Dunoon =

Hotel in Argyll and Bute, Scotland

Argyll Hotel
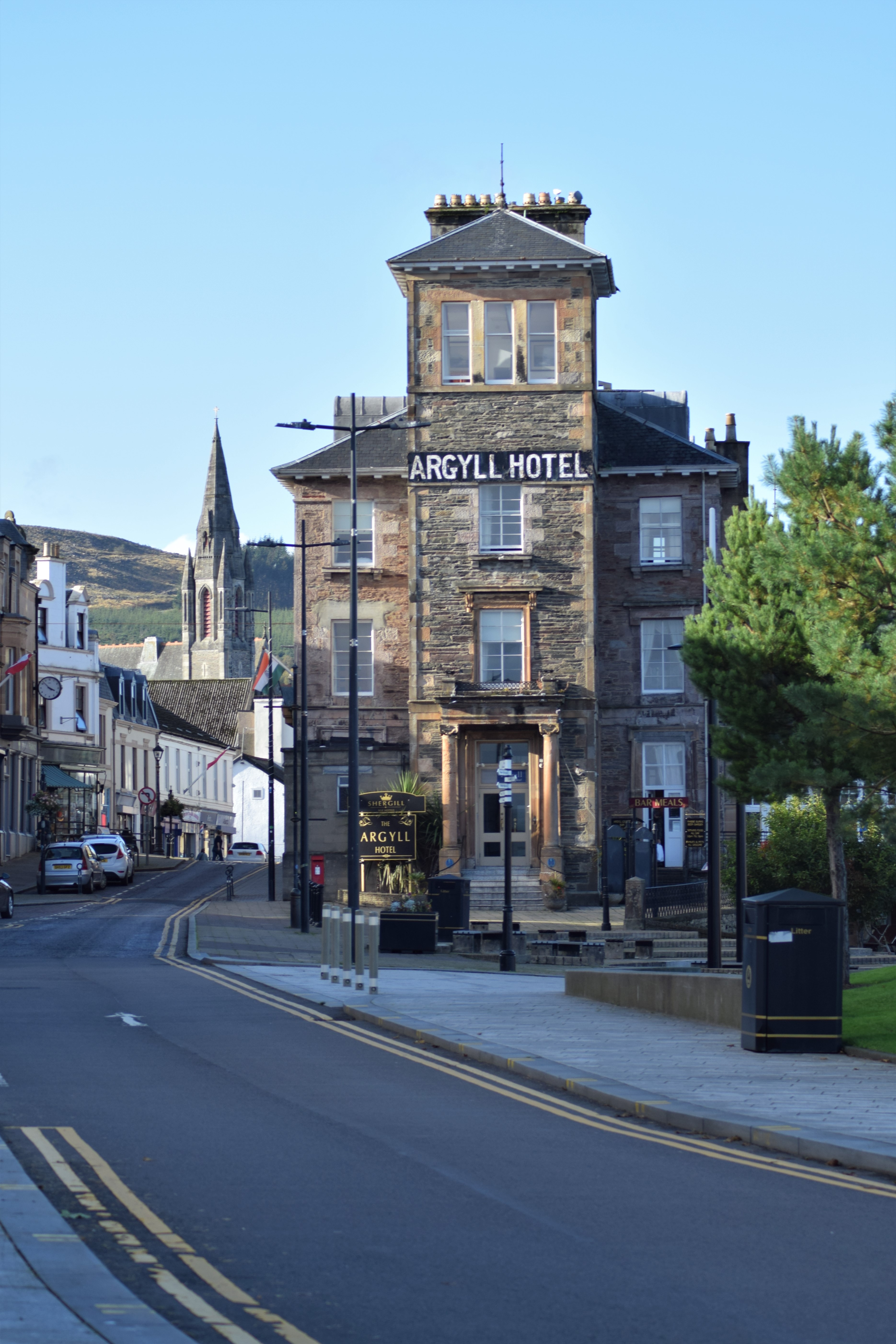
- The Argyll Hotel, pictured in 2022

- Location within Scotland Location within Argyll and Bute

General information
- Location: 54 Argyll Street, Dunoon, Argyll and Bute, Scotland
- Coordinates: 55.948433°N 4.924502°W

Technical details
- Floor count: 3 (4 in the tower)

Other information
- Number of rooms: 33
- Number of restaurants: 2

Website
- Official website

The Argyll Hotel is a hotel located on Argyll Street in Dunoon, Argyll and Bute, Scotland. It is a Category B listed building built in the mid-19th century.

The building's tower, at the southern end of the building, was added in 1876. There has been an extension on its northern side, and a two-storey addition on the eastern side, connected to the main block by a curved wing.

The hotel has 33 bedrooms and two restaurants.

== Gallery ==
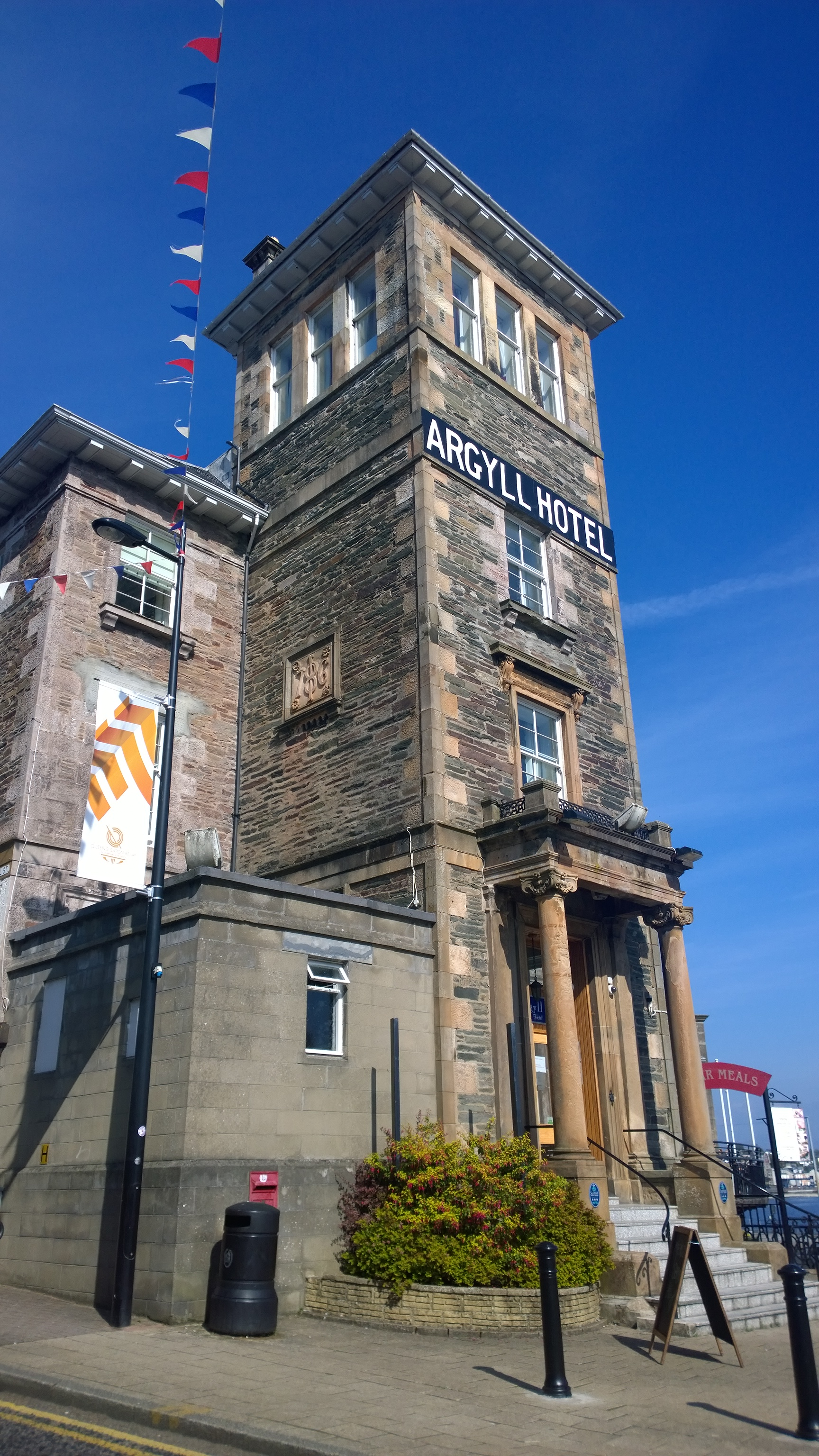
The tower's southwestern corner

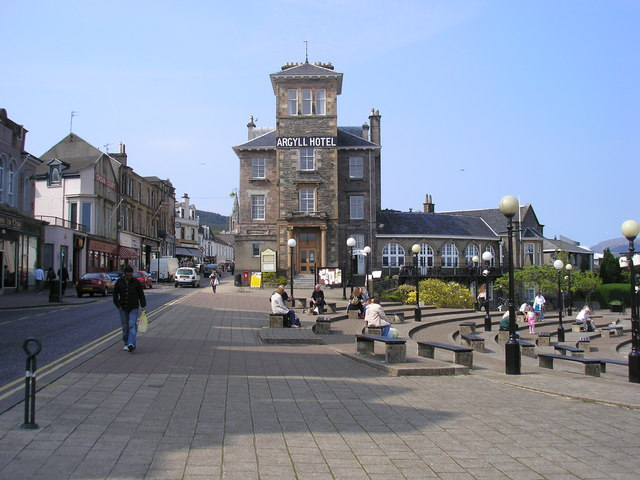
The hotel in 2007
