= Dunoon Castle =

Castle in Argyll and Bute, Scotland

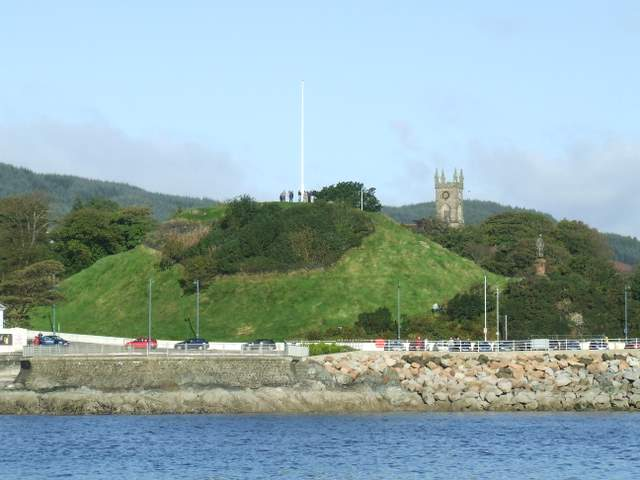
- A 2008 view from the Firth of Clyde

- Location within Scotland Location within Argyll and Bute
- Interactive map of the Dunoon Castle area

General information
- Status: No longer standing
- Location: Castle Gardens, Dunoon, Scotland
- Coordinates: 55.945599°N 4.9238077°W, National grid reference NS 04064 91102

Design and construction
- Designations: Scheduled Monument: SM5450

Dunoon Castle is a ruined castle in Dunoon, Argyll and Bute, Scotland. The castle sat upon a cone-shaped hill about 80 feet (24 m) high. Very little remains of the castle's structure today. Castle House, built in 1822, stands a few yards north of the castle ruins.

The remains of the castle, and a surrounding area, are a scheduled monument.

The castle was a royal residence in the 14th century, and in the 17th century fell into ruins.

== 13th–15th century ==
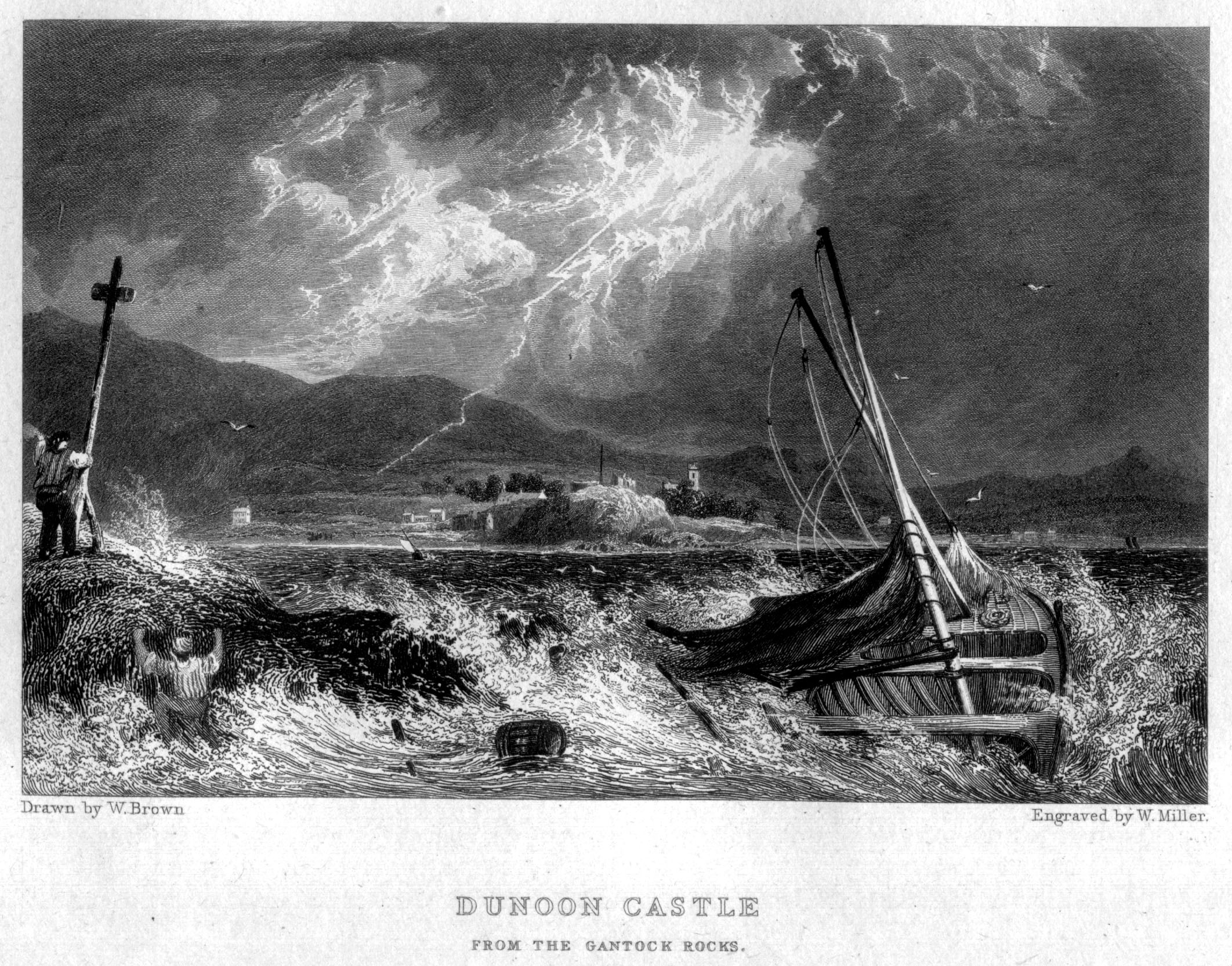
Dunoon Castle engraving by William Miller after W. Brown

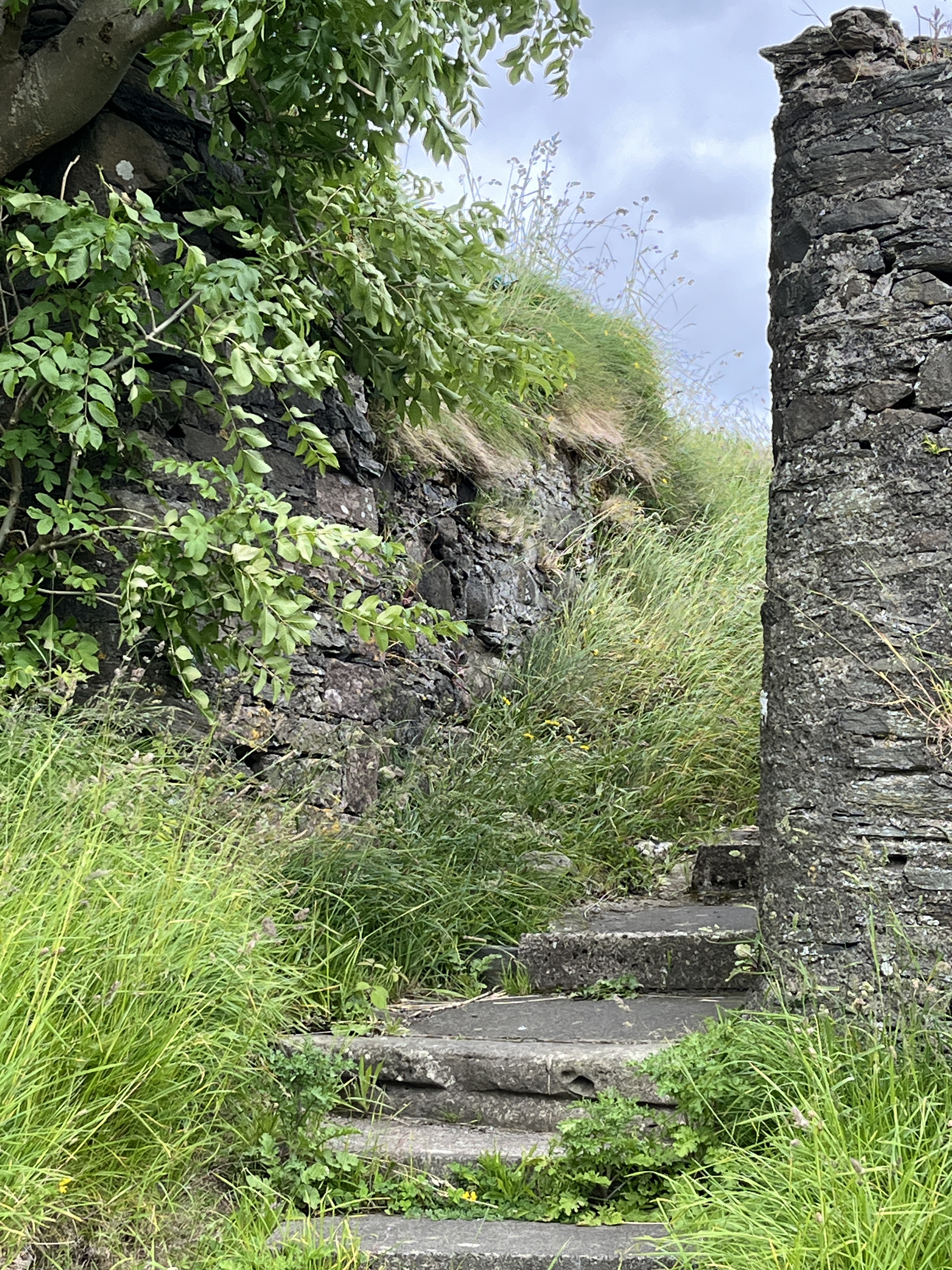
Dunoon Castle Entrance

The castle is first recorded in the thirteenth century. It may have been constructed in the context of the Stewarts increasing authority in Cowal.

In 1333, Dunoon Castle was besieged and taken by Edward Balliol, who surrendered it to Edward III of England. An insurrection ensued, driving Balliol out of Scotland. Robert the Steward, later Robert II of Scotland, arrived in Cowal and, with the help of Colin Campbell of Lochow, retook the castle.

James III undertook to repay his Master of Household, Colin Campbell, 1st Earl of Argyll for repairs to the castle in 1468, and made him keeper of the castle in 1472. By the 15th century it was a royal castle with the Campbells as hereditary keepers.

== 16th century ==
In 1544, Dunoon Castle was besieged by Matthew Stewart, 4th Earl of Lennox. Having eighteen ships and 800 soldiers provided by Henry VIII of England, Lennox succeeded in taking the Castles of Dunoon and Rothesay. Archibald Campbell, 4th Earl of Argyll, was driven out, sustaining great loss.

Mary, Queen of Scots, stayed at the castle from 27 to 29 July 1563 while visiting her half-sister, Jean Stewart, Countess of Argyll, and granted several charters during her visit. Food consumed during her visit to Dunoon was recorded in her household book. Mary's rebels met up at Dunoon during the Chaseabout Raid. Her brother the Earl of Moray's faction in Argyll included the Duke of Châtelherault, and the Earls of Argyll and Rothes. They left for Ayrshire on 18 August 1565.

== 17th century ==
In 1646, the Dunoon massacre occurred in which the Campbells slaughtered men, women, children, and infants of Clan Lamont. After the restoration of the episcopacy under Charles II, Dunoon became the residence of the bishops of Argyll for a time.

== 20th century ==
During World War I and II, military fortifications were established at Dunoon Castle for the defense of the River Clyde and the shipbuilding industry.
