= James Ewing of Strathleven =

MP for Glasgow (1775–1853)

Ewing, James, of Strathleven
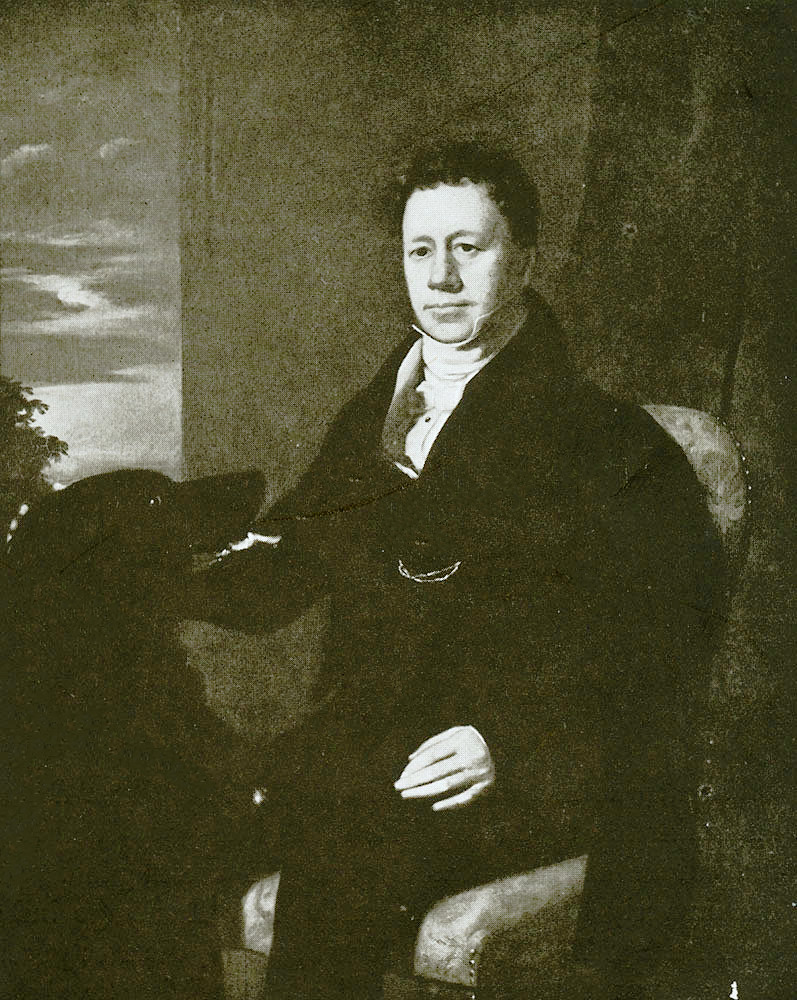

Member of Parliament for Glasgow
- In office 1832–1835
- Preceded by: New constituency
- Succeeded by: Colin Dunlop; James Oswald

Lord Provost of Glasgow
- In office 1832–1833
- Preceded by: Robert Dalglish
- Succeeded by: Robert Grahame

Personal details
- Born: 5 or 7 December 1775 Glasgow, Scotland
- Died: 29 November 1853
- Spouse: Jane Tucker Crawford
- Education: Old College

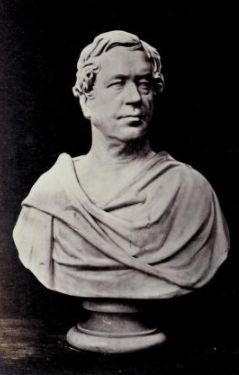
James Ewing of Strathleven by James Fillans

James Ewing of Strathleven MP FRSE LLD (1775–1853) was Lord Provost of Glasgow (1832–1833), and MP for Glasgow (1832–1835), a plantation owner, slave-holder and West Indies merchant.

== Family and early life ==
Ewing was born in Glasgow on 5 or 7 December 1775, son of West Indies merchant and bankruptcy specialist Walter Ewing and his wife Margaret, née Fisher. Walter Ewing assumed the additional surname Maclae on inheriting the Cathkin estate from his uncle Walter Maclae in 1790. After Walter Ewing Maclae's death in 1814, James Ewing's older brother, a slave holder and plantation owner in Jamaica, was known as Humphrey Ewing Maclae. Ewing's cousin through his mother was prominent abolitionist Rev. Ralph Wardlaw.

Ewing was educated at the high school in Glasgow and was apparently an 'exceptional student'. After matriculating at Old College (now the University of Glasgow) at the age of eleven, he studied Latin, Greek and philosophy.

== West India and East India connections ==
During the 1790s Ewing went into business with his father, but around 1803 established the West India trading firm James Ewing & Co with partner William Mathieson. Ewing was instrumental in the 1807 establishment of the pro-slavery lobbying group the Glasgow West India Association. He served as secretary, chairman and director of the Association at various times. Ewing was a plantation owner and slave holder in Jamaica, receiving considerable compensation under the Slave Compensation Act 1837 in both his position as slave holder as well as an assignee and creditor of other plantation owners. He was also a shipping agent to the West Indies during the 1820s.

Ewing was the author of pamphlets criticising the monopoly of the East India Company, and in addition to his West Indian interests became an East India merchant.

== Glasgow life ==
Ewing was involved in the creation of the Glasgow Savings Bank, the Glasgow Bank, and the opening of the Glasgow Necropolis. He wrote a number of reports about city institutions, including a report in 1818 to the hospital directors on the management of the city's poor. Following this he advocated for the building of a new prison.

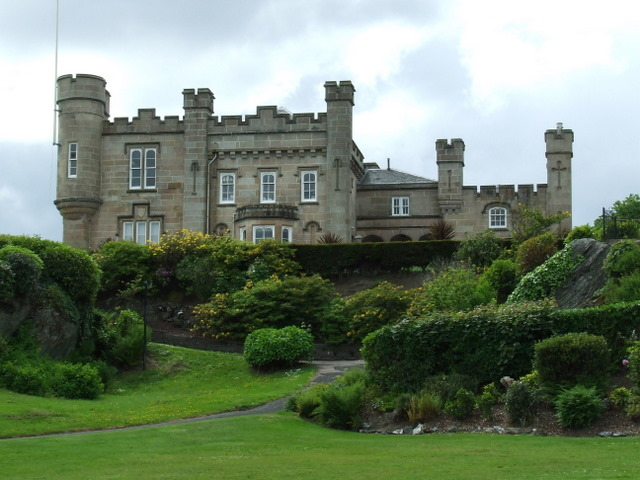
Castle House, Dunoon, built for Ewing

Ewing was twice elected Dean of Guild of the Merchants' House, was Lord Provost of Glasgow (1831–1833), and was elected MP for Glasgow in 1832, which led to his denouncement in the Reformer's Gazette as an "absolute proprietor of numerous 'gangs' … of Slaves in the Colonies". He lost the seat in 1835.

== Honours ==
Ewing was awarded an honorary LLD by the University of Glasgow in 1826. In March 1829, he was elected a Fellow of the Royal Society of Edinburgh.

== Artistic recognition ==
He was portrayed by John Graham Gilbert RSA. The location of the portrait is not known.

== Property ==
Ewing lived in Crawford mansion on Queen Street in Glasgow for many years. The house was famous for its rookery, and Ewing consequently became known as Craw Ewing. In 1824 Ewing built Castle House in Dunoon, which he subsequently sold. In 1830 Ewing purchased the Levenside estate in Glasgow for £100,000, renamed it Strathleven, and subsequently built Strathleven House there.

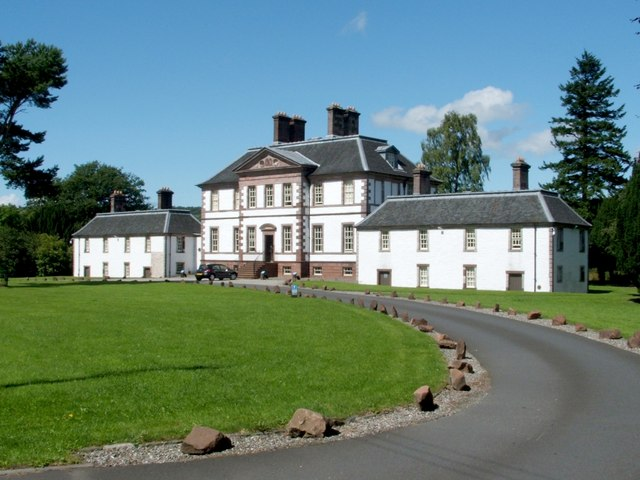
Strathleven House

== Marriage ==
In 1836 Ewing married Jane Tucker Crawford (1812/3–1896). Jane was the daughter of James Crawford of Broadfield, Renfrew, who was also a Scottish merchant.

== Death and legacy ==
Ewing died at home in Glasgow on 29 November 1853, and was buried in the Necropolis.

In 1827, Ewing had presented the University of Glasgow with £100 to establish the Ewing Gold Medal which is still awarded annually for historical essays, alternately in Medieval and Modern History.

The ONDB regards Ewing as "among the most financially successful of the city's élite nineteenth-century sugar/slavery aristocracy". His bequests included £17,500 to the Free Church of Scotland, £10,000 to the Royal Infirmary, and £31,000 to the Merchants House to support the dependents of 'decayed Glasgow merchants'. A part of this latter bequest was used to establish a bursary in his name at the University of Glasgow. As Ewing died without issue, his wife inherited a life interest in the estate of Strathleven, after which it passed to his nephew Humphrey Ewing Crum (1802–1887), who assumed the name of Ewing. Ownership of Ewing's properties in Jamaica remained within the family in Scotland.

== Not MP for Wareham ==
Ewing is often confused with James Ewing (1784–1852), East India Company official and MP for Wareham.

== Writing ==
- Memoir of James Ewing Esq., of Strathleven, formerly Lord Provost of Glasgow, and M.P. for that city, LL. D. of the University of Glasgow: with a series of letters written while on a tour in Italy, Switzerland, by Macintosh Mackay, Published by James Maclehose, 1866, Glasgow
- View of the history, constitution, & funds of the Guildry, and Merchants House of Glasgow, by James Ewing, published 1817 by an unknown publisher.

Parliament of the United Kingdom
New constituency	Member of Parliament for Glasgow; 1832 – 1835; With: James Oswald	Succeeded by Colin Dunlop; James Oswald
