= Thomas Russell (Glasgow MP) =

Scottish businessman and politician

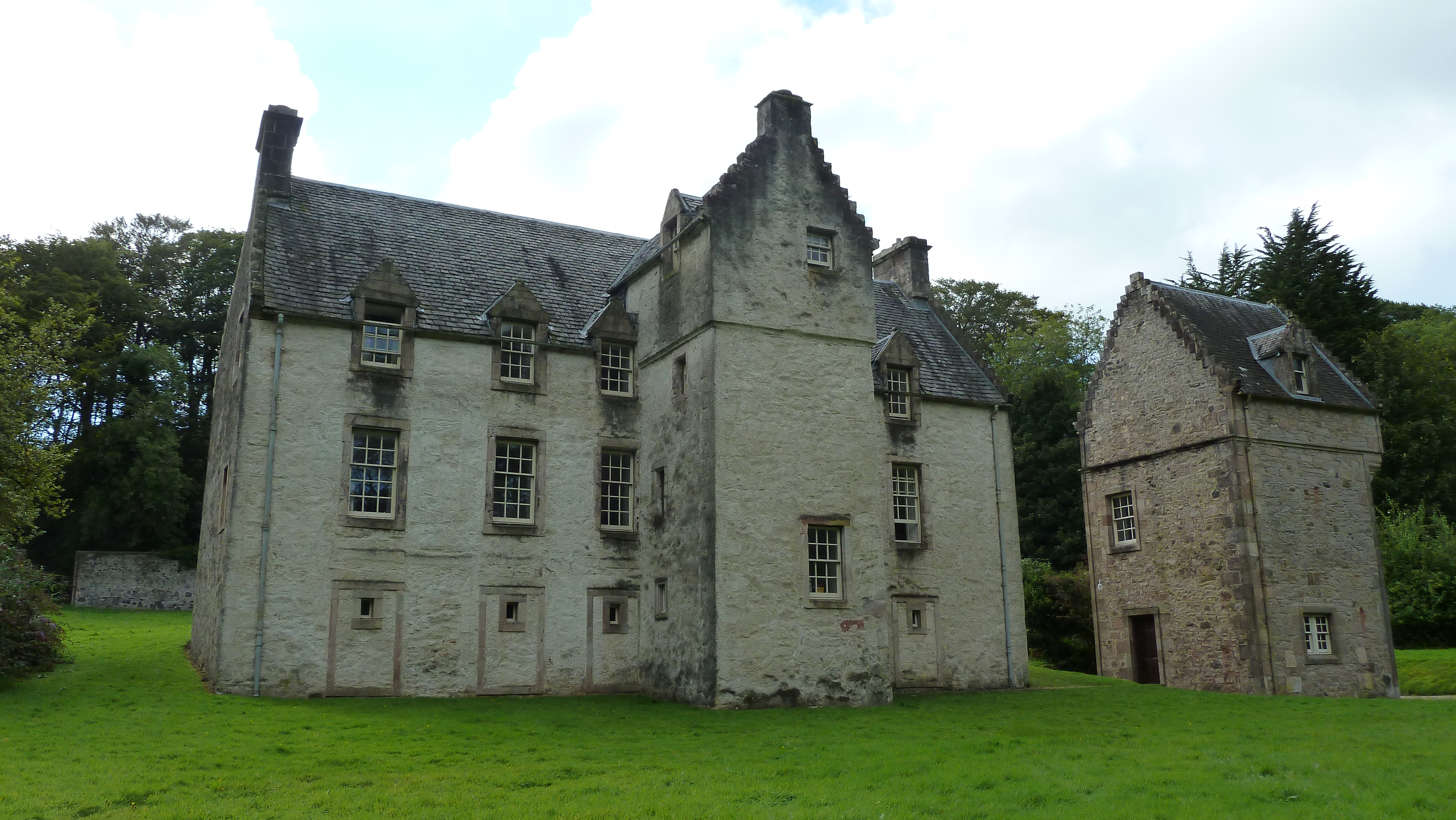
Ascog House, where Thomas Russell lived from 1877 to about 1900

Thomas Russell (1836 – 15 August 1911) was a Scottish businessman and politician. He was a partner in the Saracen Foundry, established by his brother-in-law Walter Macfarlane, and bought the Ascog House estate in Bute. He also built a Glasgow city house at 5 Cleveden Road, completed in 1887, and developed housing in Ascog.

Russell was Member of Parliament for Buteshire in 1880. He was also Liberal MP for Glasgow for a few months in 1885. He was returned unopposed at a by-election.

The seat was abolished at the next general election.

== Notes ==
Parliament of the United Kingdom
Preceded by Charles Dalrymple	Member of Parliament for Buteshire; April 1880 – June 1880	Succeeded by Charles Dalrymple
Preceded by Robert Tweedie Middleton; Sir Charles Cameron; George Anderson	Member of Parliament for Glasgow; March 1885 – November 1885; With: Robert Tweedie Middleton; Sir Charles Cameron	Constituency abolished
