= Robert Dalglish =

Robert Dalglish may refer to:

- Robert Dalglish (politician) (1808–1880), Scottish Radical politician
- Robert Dalglish (merchant) (1770–1844), Scottish merchant, calico printer and Lord Provost of Glasgow
- Robert Daglish (1779–1865), English colliery manager, mining, mechanical and civil engineer
