= John Dennistoun =

British Whig politician and banker

Member of Parliament for Glasgow
- In office 27 May 1837 – 31 July 1847 Serving with William Bentinck (1837–1839); James Oswald (1839–1847)
- Preceded by: James Oswald; William Bentinck
- Succeeded by: John MacGregor; Alexander Hastie

Personal details
- Born: 1803
- Died: 9 September 1870 (aged 66–67)
- Party: Whig

John Dennistoun (19 March 1803 – 9 September 1870) was a British Whig politician and banker.

A member of Brooks's, he was elected Whig MP for Glasgow at a by-election in 1837—caused by the resignation of James Oswald—and held the seat until 1847 when he was defeated.

His wife Frances was the daughter of Sir Henry Onslow. His brother Alexander Dennistoun was Whig MP for Dunbartonshire from 1835 to 1837.

Parliament of the United Kingdom
Preceded by James Oswald; William Bentinck	Member of Parliament for Glasgow; 1837–1847; With: William Bentinck (1837–1839); James Oswald (1839–1847)	Succeeded by John MacGregor; Alexander Hastie
