= Henry Wise (merchant) =

English merchant

Henry Wise (16 August 1802 – 25 December 1866) was a mariner and merchant associated with the East Asia.

Born in Oxford, Wise worked his way up as a mariner in the East India Company's Marine Service from midshipman in 1819 to chief officer in 1831, and then a supercargo in the China trade. His logbooks from voyages in the Castle Huntly, Astell, and Elizabeth are preserved at the National Maritime Museum.

He invented several schemes related to speeding travel between England and the East, publishing a book proposing the use of steam and a 'propeller' in 1839, a 'Plan for the Acceleration of the China Mails' (i.e. their conveyance from Suez via Ceylon to Hong Kong direct) submitted to her Majesty's Government 14 September 1843, and advocating a canal across Siam in 1859.

By 1838, he was settled in London and he is principally known for his subsequent involvement with James Brooke: he helped fit out the ship for his 1839 voyage and became the agent in London to the now Rajah of Sarawak in 1841. This relationship soured around 1847 when the Eastern Archipelago Company was set up at considerable advantage to Wise who contributed rights handed to him by Brooke to mine coal in Labuan in return for fees, equity, and the job of Managing Director. The Rajah also blamed Wise for his loss of money when the firm of Melville & Street collapsed in 1848. Legal wrangles instituted by the Rajah established that the EAC was undercapitalised and only got its charter by very creative accounting, in which officials acquiesced. Fraudulent or not, the company was ambitious, but struggled until finally being wound up in 1857. Wise lost money as a shareholder in the fraudulent Royal British Bank, which had had the same founding Chairman as the Eastern Archipelago Company, one John MacGregor MP.

He died in Hampstead in 1866, leaving a wife, Elizabeth, two daughters (Henrietta Elizabeth b.1848 and Harriet Grace b.1850), and 'effects under £1500' in his will. Elizabeth died 26 March 1872, at 27, Fairfax-road, South Hampstead, aged 62.
