= Walter Buchanan =

Walter Buchanan is the name of:

- Walter Clarke Buchanan (1838–1924), New Zealand politician
- Walter Buchanan (footballer) (1855–1926), England international footballer
- Walter Buchanan (musician) (1914–1988), American jazz musician
- Walter Buchanan (MP) (1797–1877), British Whig and Liberal politician
