= Sir Charles Cameron, 1st Baronet =

Scottish doctor, newspaper editor and Liberal politician (1841–1924)

Cameron in 1899.

Sir Charles Cameron, 1st Baronet, CB (18 December 1841 – 2 October 1924), was a Scottish doctor, newspaper editor and Liberal politician.

Cameron was born in Dublin, the son of John Cameron, newspaper proprietor of Glasgow and Dublin. He was educated at Madras College, St Andrews, and at Trinity College, Dublin. He also studied at medical schools in Paris, Berlin, and Vienna, but never practised medicine. He became editor of the North British Daily Mail (later incorporated into the Daily Record) in 1864, and was managing proprietor of the paper from 1873.

At the 1874 general election, Cameron was elected as one of the three Members of Parliament (MPs) for Glasgow. The constituency was broken up under the Redistribution of Seats Act 1885, and he was elected at the 1885 general election as the MP for the new Glasgow College constituency. He held the seat until his defeat at the 1895 general election. Cameron was created baronet Cameron of Balclutha, Renfrew, on 7 August 1893 for his journalistic and parliamentary services. He was subsequently elected as MP for Glasgow Bridgeton at a by-election in February 1897, and held the seat until he stood down at the 1900 general election. He was appointed CB in the 1899 New Year Honours.

Cameron was an active member of the House of Commons. He was responsible for the Inebriates Acts, secured various reforms in the Scottish Liquor Laws and was a member of the Royal Commission on the Liquor Licensing Laws in 1895. He was also behind laws conferring the municipal franchise on women, and acts abolishing imprisonment for debt in Scotland and was a member of the Departmental Committee on Habitual Offenders (Scotland) in 1894. His resolution led to the adoption of sixpenny telegrams and he was on the Committee on Transit of Cattle Coastwise in 1893. He wrote a number of pamphlets on medical, social, and political subjects.

He served as president of the Cremation Society of Great Britain, as did his son and successor to the baronetcy.

Cameron lived at Glenridge, Virginia Water, where he enjoyed motoring, riding, and travel. He died at the age of 82.

Cameron married firstly Frances Caroline Macaulay in 1869. Their son John succeeded to the baronetcy. Frances died in 1899, and he married secondly Blanche Perman.

== Legacy ==
The Cameron Memorial Fountain, in Glasgow's Sauchiehall Street, is dedicated to him.

Parliament of the United Kingdom
Preceded by Robert Dalglish; William Graham; George Anderson	Member of Parliament for Glasgow; 1874–1885; With: George Anderson 1874–1885; Alexander Whitelaw 1874–1879; Charles Tennant 1879–1880; Robert Tweedie Middleton 1880–1885; Thomas Russell 1885	Constituency divided
New constituency (see Glasgow)	Member of Parliament for Glasgow College; 1885–1895	Succeeded by John Stirling-Maxwell
Preceded by Sir George Trevelyan	Member of Parliament for Glasgow Bridgeton; 1897–1900	Succeeded by Charles Dickson
Media offices
Preceded by Robert Somers	Editor of the North British Daily Mail; 1864–1874	Succeeded by James R. Manners
Baronetage of the United Kingdom
New title	Baronet (of Balclutha, Renfrewshire); 1893–1924	Succeeded by John Cameron
