= 1879 Glasgow by-election =

UK parliamentary by-election

The 1879 Glasgow by-election was fought on 16 July 1879. The by-election was fought due to the death of the incumbent Conservative MP, Alexander Whitelaw. It was won by the unopposed Liberal candidate Charles Clow Tennant.
