= Alexander Whitelaw =

Scottish ironmaster, philanthropist and Conservative Member of Parliament

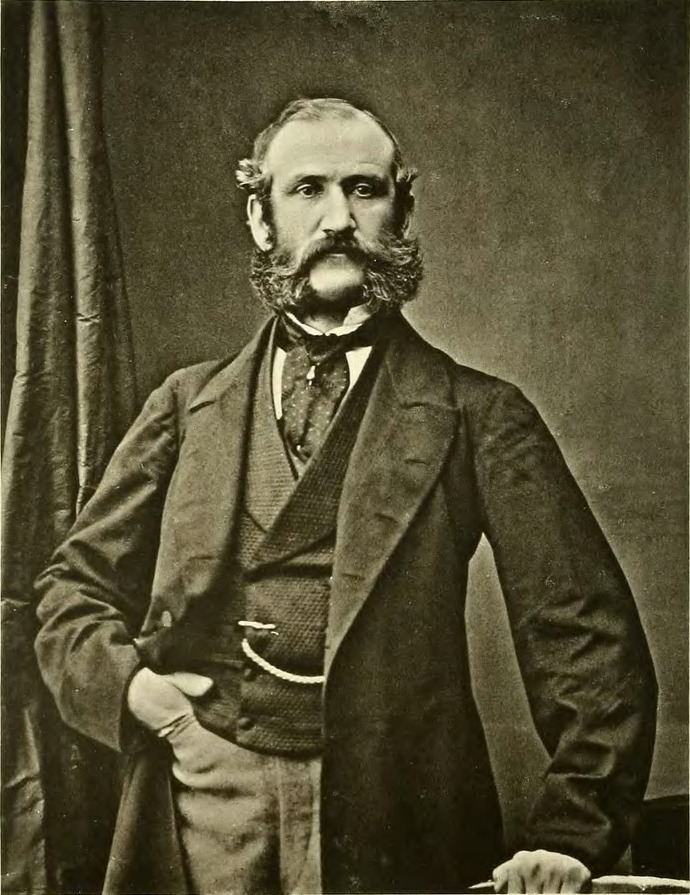

Member of Parliament for Glasgow
- In office 1874–1879 Serving with Charles Cameron and George Anderson
- Preceded by: Robert Dalglish
- Succeeded by: Charles Tennant

Personal details
- Born: 1823 Drumpark, Monklands, Scotland
- Died: 1879 (aged 55–56)
- Party: Conservative

Alexander Whitelaw (1823–1879) was a Scottish ironmaster, philanthropist and Conservative Member of Parliament (MP) for Glasgow from 1874 until his death.

== Life ==
Whitelaw was born in 1823 in Drumpark in Monklands and was educated at Grange School, Sunderland and then took some time to study mining. In 1846 he married Barbara Forbes Lockhart of Cambusnethan which established a marital connection to the Baird family. The Baird family founded the iron smelting firm of William Baird & Co., in which Whitelaw became a managing partner. The Baird family acquired the Gartsherrie coal fields in 1826 and the mansion and estate in 1834.

Through his philanthropy, he left endowments to churches and schools, including helping to found the Gartsherrie Academy, and for the 1863–1864 session he was Vice President of the Academy. Whitelaw's interest in education led him to become Chairman of the Glasgow School Board in 1873. One cartoon shows him having administered a thrashing to John Page Hopps, a fellow Board member with whom he had clashed.

In 1863, Whitelaw is recorded in the "Curler's Annual" as being the President of the Coatbridge Cricket Club.

Whitelaw was a Conservative and represented Glasgow as an MP from 1874 until his death in 1879. His second son Graeme was MP for North West Lanarkshire and his third son William was MP for Perth.

Parliament of the United Kingdom
Preceded by William Graham; Robert Dalglish; George Anderson	Member of Parliament for Glasgow; 1874 – 1879; With: Charles Cameron; George Anderson	Succeeded by Charles Cameron; George Anderson; Charles Tennant
