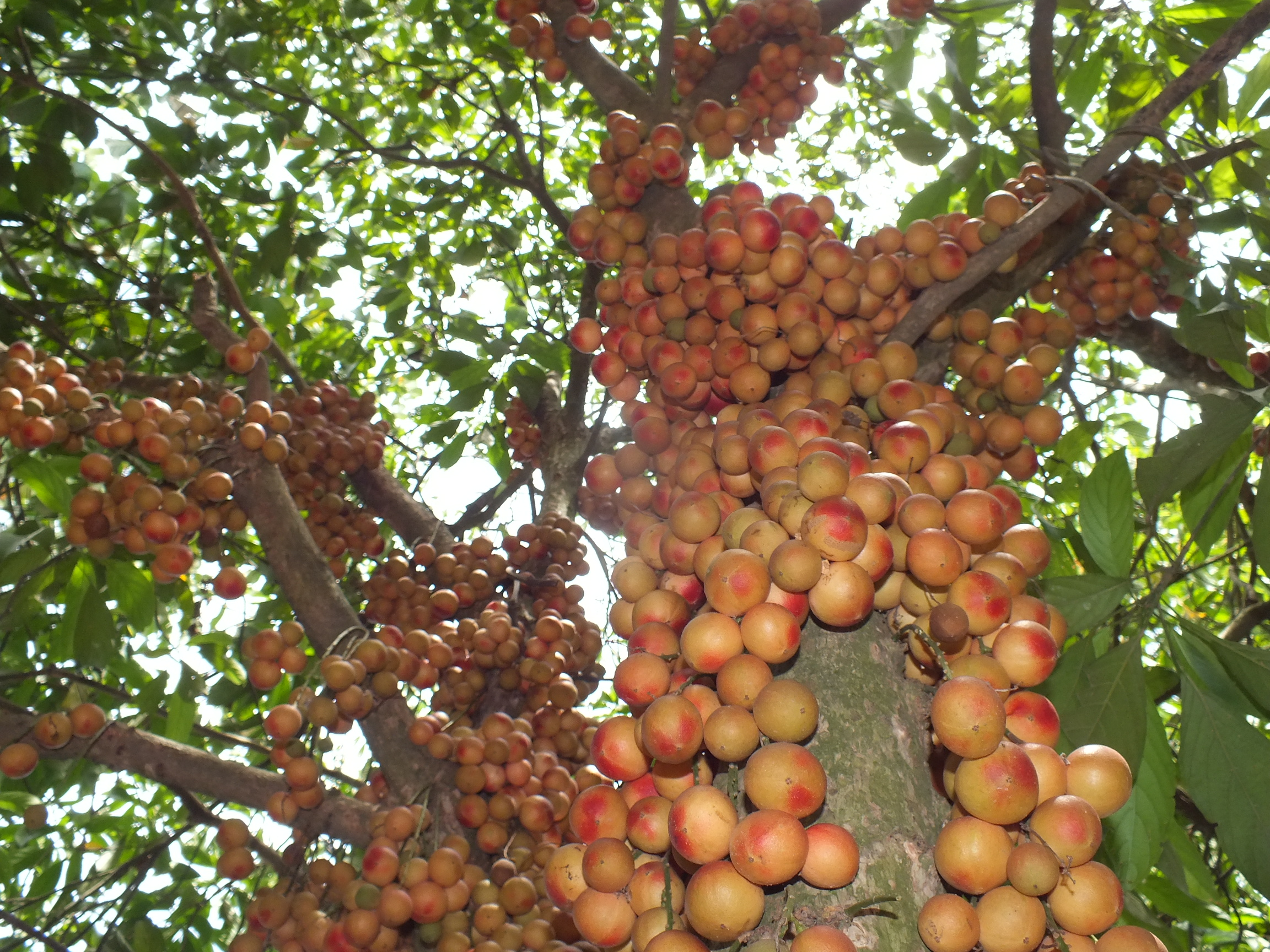

Conservation status
- Least Concern (IUCN 3.1)

Scientific classification
- Kingdom: Plantae
- Clade: Tracheophytes
- Clade: Angiosperms
- Clade: Eudicots
- Clade: Rosids
- Order: Malpighiales
- Family: Phyllanthaceae
- Genus: Baccaurea
- Species: B. motleyana

Binomial name
- Baccaurea motleyana (Müll.Arg.) Müll.Arg.

Synonyms
- Baccaurea pubescens Pax & K.Hoffm.; Pierardia motleyana Müll.Arg.

= Baccaurea motleyana =

Species of tree

Baccaurea motleyana is a species of fruit tree in the family Phyllanthaceae. It is native to Thailand, Peninsular Malaysia, Sumatra and Borneo. It is cultivated for its fruit in India and Bangladesh.

== Description ==
This is a tree generally growing to 9 to 12 meters (30 to 39 ft) in height with a short trunk and a broad crown.

The evergreen leaves are shiny green on the upper surface and greenish-brown and hairy underneath. Each leaf is up to 33 centimeters (13 in) long and 15 centimeters (5.9 in) wide.

The species is dioecious, with male and female flowers growing on separate individuals. Both types of flowers are fragrant and have yellow sepals. The staminate racemes are up to 15 centimeters (5.9 in) long and the pistillate inflorescences may reach 75 centimeters (30 in) in length. The fruits are each 2 to 5 centimeters (0.79 to 1.97 in) long and about two wide and grow in strands.

Each fruit has velvety pinkish, yellow, or brown skin which wrinkles at ripening and is filled with whitish pulp containing 3 to 5 seeds. The pulp is sweet to acid in taste. They may be eaten raw or cooked or made into jam or wine.

== Taxonomy ==
Baccaurea motleyana was initially described as Pierardia motleyana by Swiss botanist Johannes Müller Argoviensis in 1864. In 1866 he moved the species to the genus Baccaurea. The specific name honours the English botanist James Motley, who collected it in southeast Borneo.

== Uses ==
The tree is also used for shade and low-quality wood.

== Gallery ==
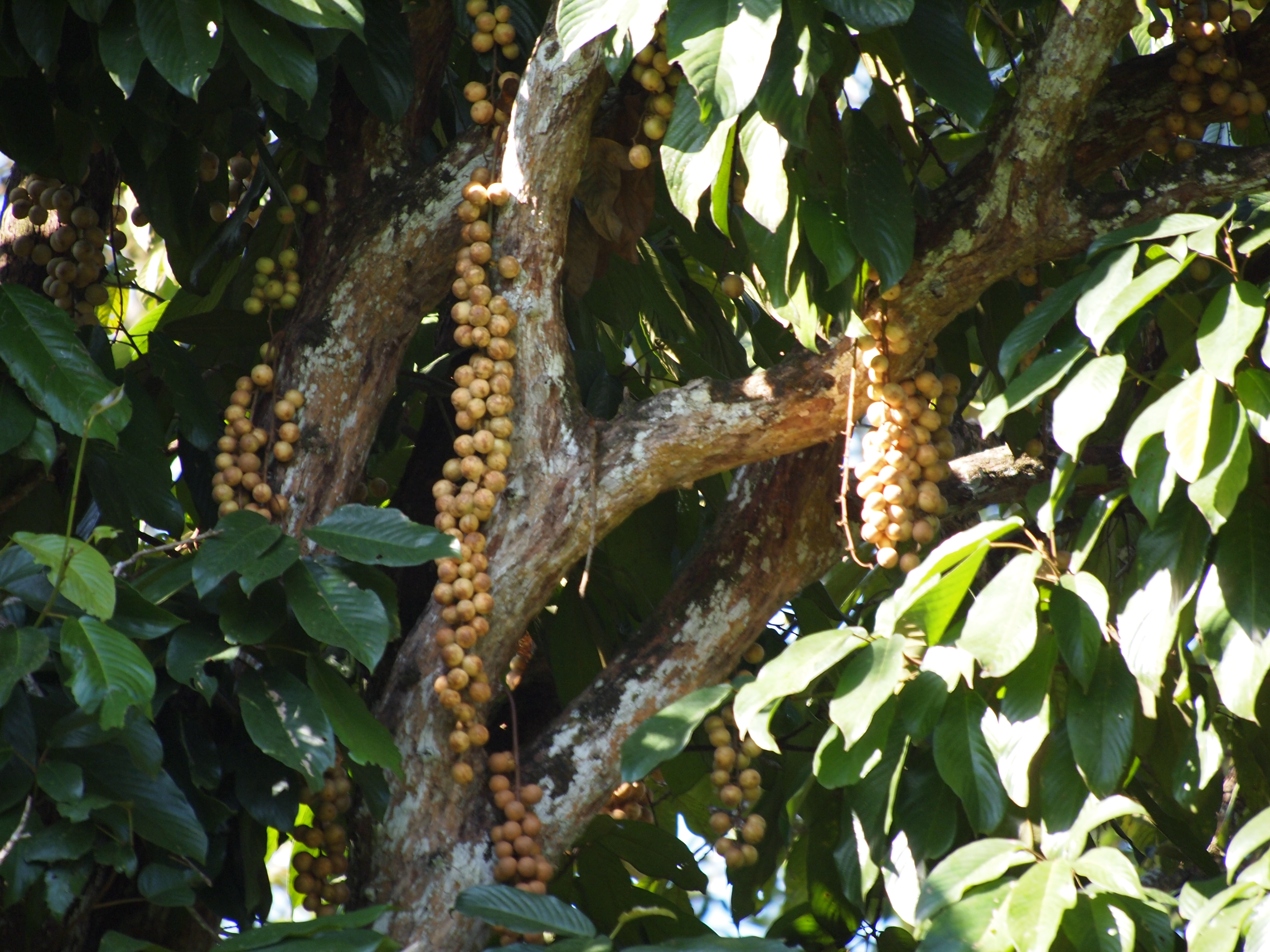
The tree with fruits

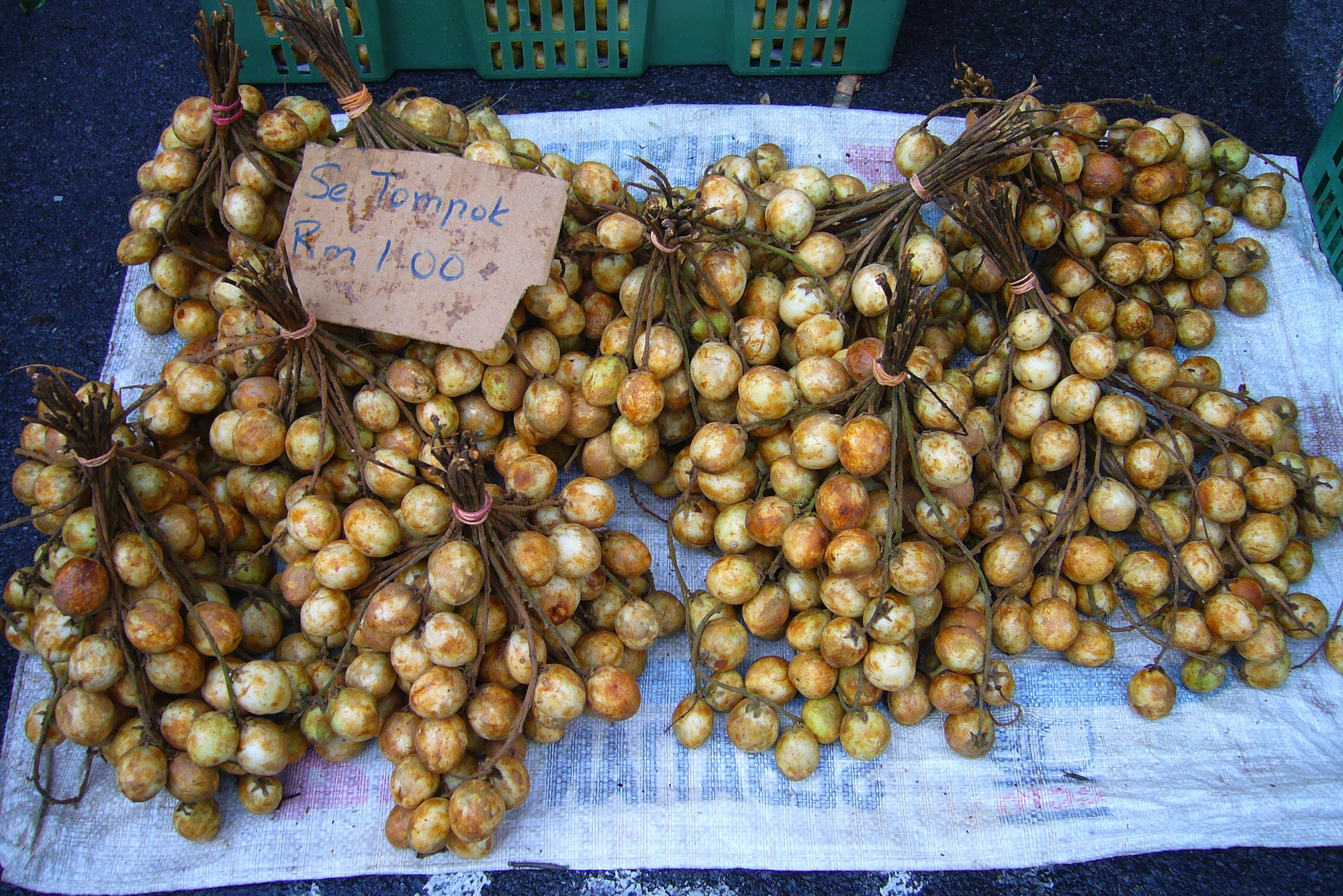
Fruits

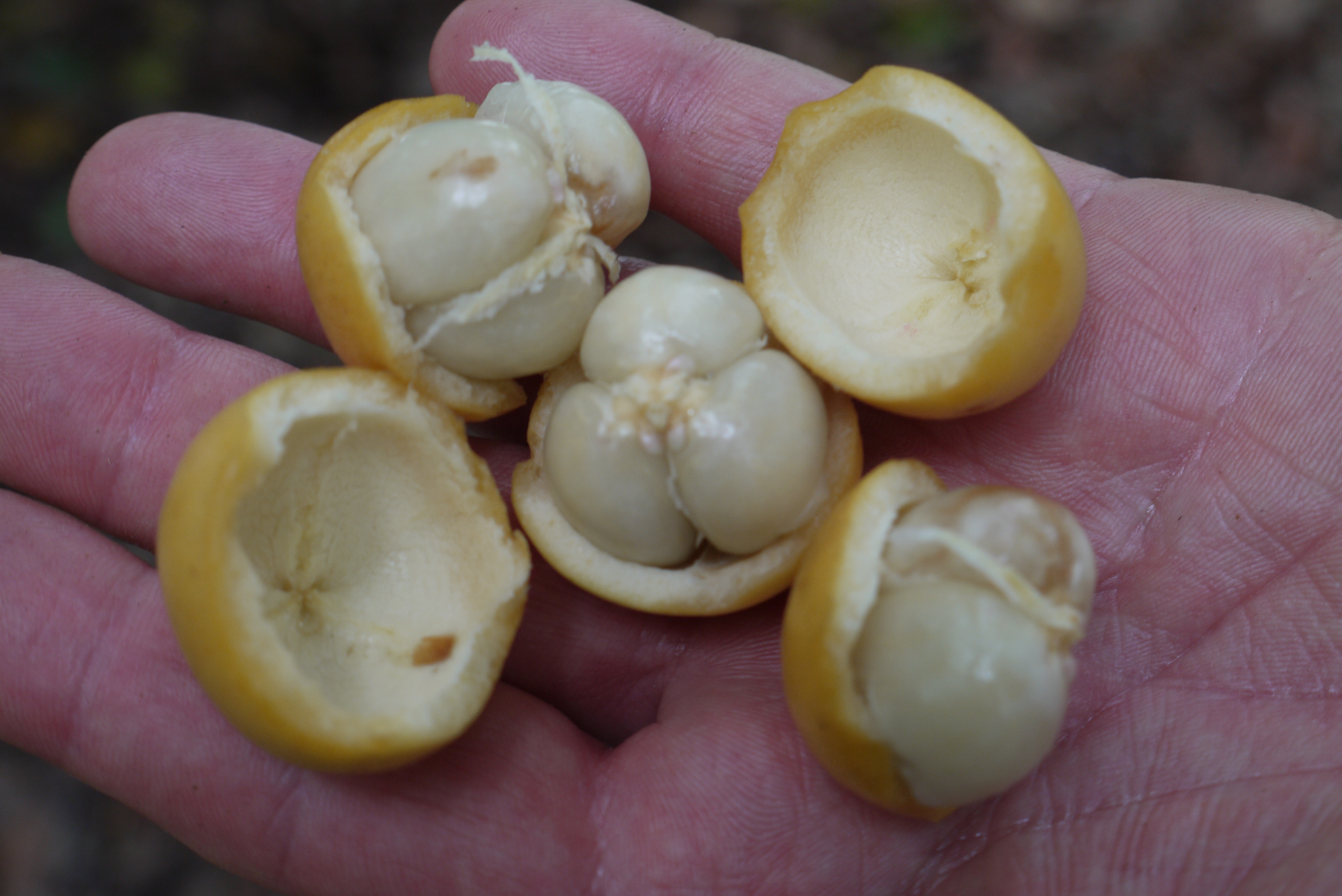
Inside of the fruits

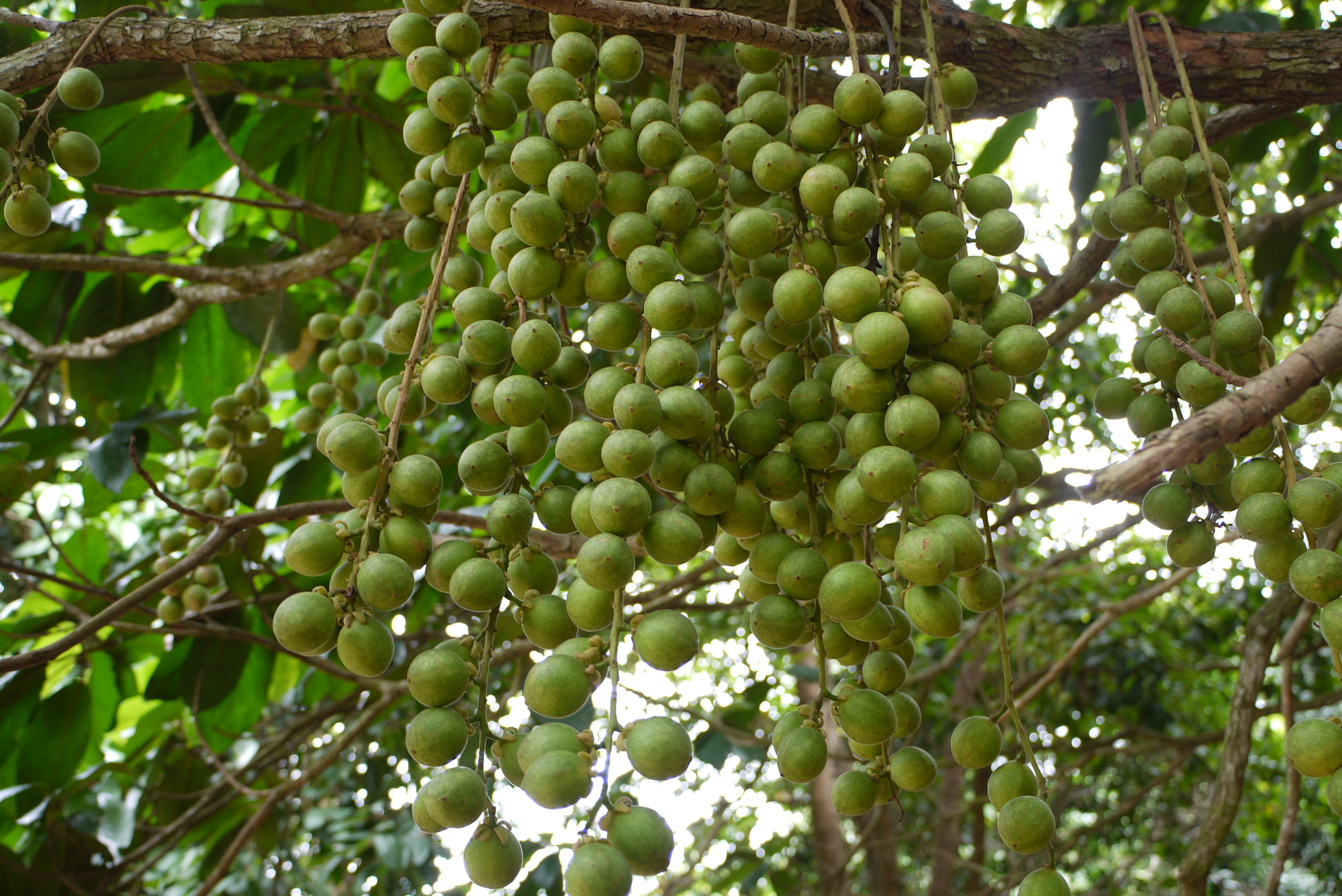
Young fruits of Baccaurea motleyana (Phyllanthaceae)
