= George Anderson (MP) =

British politician

George Anderson (19 November 1819 – 4 November 1896) was a Liberal Party politician in the United Kingdom.

He was elected at the 1868 general election as one of the three Members of Parliament (MPs) for Glasgow, taking the extra seat created for the city by the Representation of the People (Scotland) Act 1868.

Anderson held the seat until he resigned in March 1885 by becoming Steward of the Manor of Northstead, to take up the post of Deputy Master of the Mint in Melbourne, Australia.

Parliament of the United Kingdom
Preceded by William Graham; Robert Dalglish	Member of Parliament for Glasgow; 1868 – 1885; With: William Graham to 1874; Robert Dalglish to 1874; Charles Cameron 1874–1885; Alexander Whitelaw 1874–1879; Charles Tennant 1879–1880; Robert Tweedie Middleton from 1880	Succeeded by Thomas Russell; Robert Tweedie Middleton; Charles Cameron
