= Ascog =

Village on the Isle of Bute, Scotland

Coordinates: 55.825°N 5.022°W

Ascog: Scottish Gaelic: Àsgaig
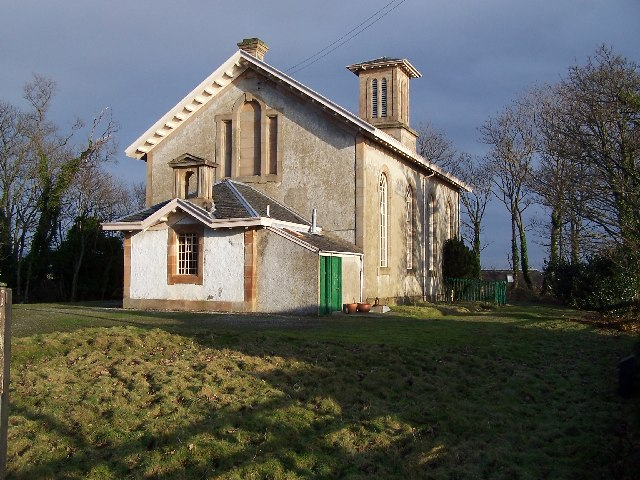
- Ascog Church

- Location within Argyll and Bute
- OS grid reference: NS107632
- Civil parish: Kingarth
- Council area: Argyll and Bute
- Lieutenancy area: Argyll and Bute
- Country: Scotland
- Sovereign state: United Kingdom
- Post town: ISLE OF BUTE
- Postcode district: PA20
- Dialling code: 01700
- Police: Scotland
- Fire: Scottish
- Ambulance: Scottish
- UK Parliament: Argyll, Bute and South Lochaber
- Scottish Parliament: Argyll and Bute

Ascog (Scottish Gaelic: Àsgaig) is a small village on the Isle of Bute, within Argyll and Bute council area, Scotland. The village is within the parish of Kingarth, and is situated on the A844. It is located on the east coast of the island, about 2 miles to the south east of Rothesay. It is largely residential.

There are several historic buildings in the area, including Ascog House, Ascog Hall, and the Italianate style Balmory Hall. Loch Ascog lies to the west.
