= Colin Dunlop (politician) =

Scottish politician and industrialist (1775–1837)

Colin Dunlop (15 September 1775 – 27 July 1837) was a Scottish politician and industrialist.

Originating from Dunlop, Dunlop qualified as an advocate, but soon left this to set up the Clyde Iron Works. There, he patented the Hot Air Blast technique.

Dunlop was the president of the Glasgow Anti-Corn Law Association. He stood in Glasgow in the 1835 UK general election as a Whig, winning a seat, but resigned in February 1836 by taking the Chiltern Hundreds. He died the following year.

Parliament of the United Kingdom
Preceded by James Ewing; James Oswald	Member of Parliament for Glasgow; 1835–1836; With: James Oswald	Succeeded by William Bentinck; James Oswald
