= Robert Dalglish (politician) =

Scottish Radical politician

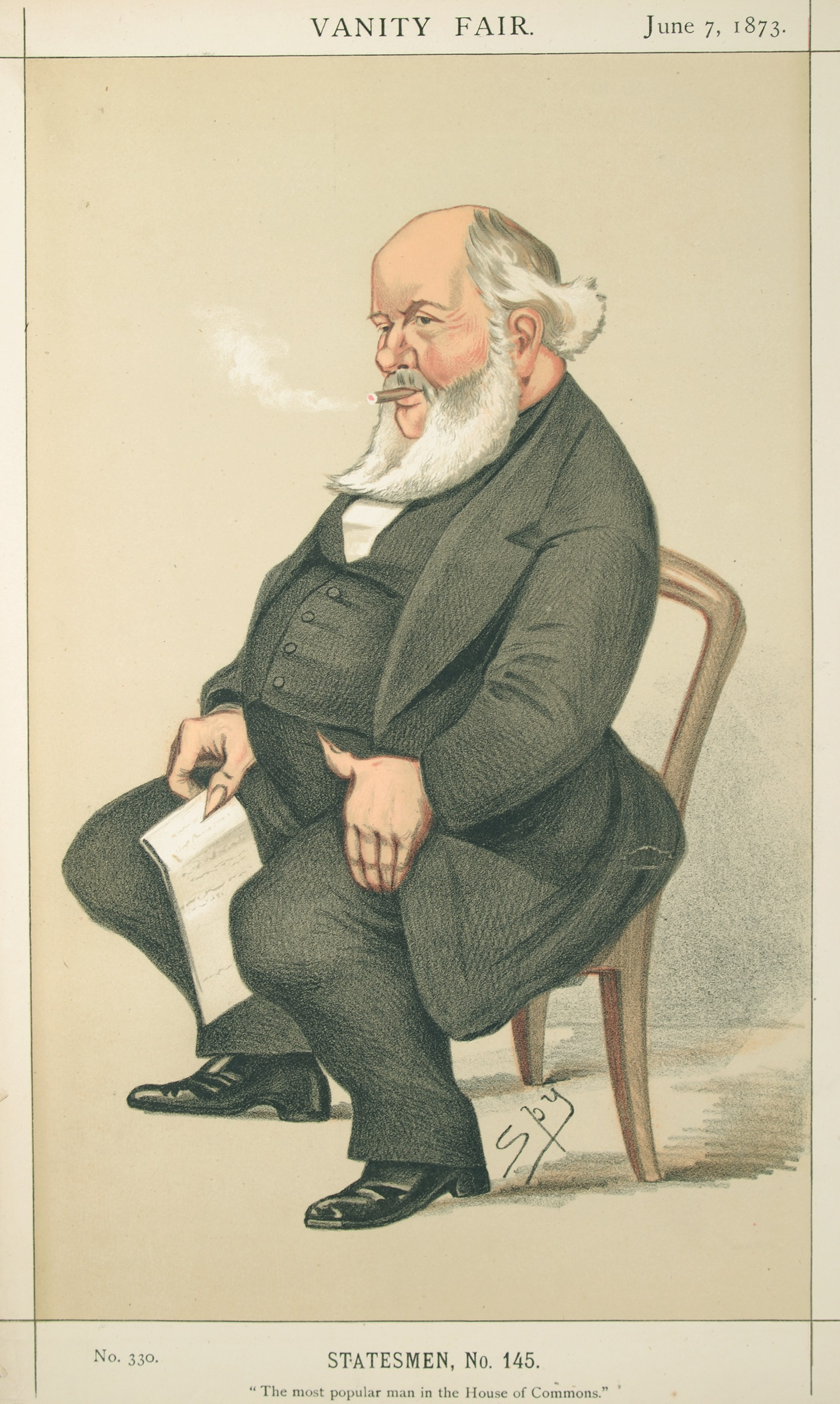
"The most popular man in the House of Commons" Dalglish as caricatured by Spy (Leslie Ward) in Vanity Fair, June 1873

Robert Dalglish (4 January 1808 – 20 June 1880) was a Scottish Radical politician. He was the Member of Parliament MP for Glasgow from 1857 to 1874.

== Life ==
Dalglish was born in Glasgow, the son of Robert Dalglish (1770–1844) the Lord Provost of Glasgow from 1830 to 1832 and brother of Andrew Stevenson Dalglish (1793–1858). He was educated at Glasgow University and became the head of the family calico printing firm of Dalglish, Falconer & Son founded in Lennoxtown by his father.

He was Independent Radical M.P. for Glasgow from 1857 to 1874 speaking in favour of extending of the franchise, voting by ballot and a more equal distribution of electoral districts... He was a popular and respected MP. "Vanity Fair" in 1873 said "Popularity is commonly but a poor test of merit, yet in Parliament it has a distinct value and meaning, so that Mr. Dalglish may well be proud of being known as the most popular Member of the House of Commons. He has in truth all the qualities which command consideration among a body of ordinary sensible men. He possesses the charity that is not puffed up, he is an easy-going, good-natured man, he is fond of the fair sex, he gives good dinners, and yet at the same time he has a sound judgment and discretion, often appealed to by men whose names are far more frequently before the public. He is one of those valuable and too rare Members who are useful in Committee, and seldom speak at all, and never without saying something to the point at issue and worthy of being ranged among the arguments concerning it."

He was a great admirer of the Duke of Wellington and was heavily involved in the erection of Marochetti's statue of the "Iron Duke" in front of the Royal Exchange Square, Glasgow. Dalglish himself is commemorated by a bas-relief on Queen Victoria's statue in George Square.

He owned and resided at Kilmardinny House in Bearsden from 1853, making substantial improvements to the property to the designs of architect James Smith. Kilmardinny was purchased by Thomas Reid (1831-1900) Chairman of Nobel Explosives and Provost of Govan following Dalglish's death.

Parliament of the United Kingdom
Preceded by John MacGregor and Alexander Hastie	Member of Parliament for Glasgow; 1857–1874; With: Walter Buchanan to 1865; William Graham 1865–1874; George Anderson from 1868	Succeeded by Sir Charles Cameron; George Anderson; Alexander Whitelaw
