= Kilmardinny =

Scottish loch

Coordinates: 55.9276°N 4.3234°W

Kilmardinny is a loch in Bearsden, East Dunbartonshire, Scotland. Kilmardinny Loch is a nature reserve of wet & dry woodland & grassland, plus the loch itself and its four islands. There is no fishing permitted in the loch.

Situated nearby is Kilmardinny House, which, after being owned by a succession of Glaswegian merchants and the Glasgow MP Robert Dalglish, was donated to the East Dunbartonshire Council and is now used as an arts and culture centre.

The loch is featured in a survey of historic gardens and designed Landscapes carried out for the East Dunbartonshire Council.
