= Castle House, Dunoon =

Castle House
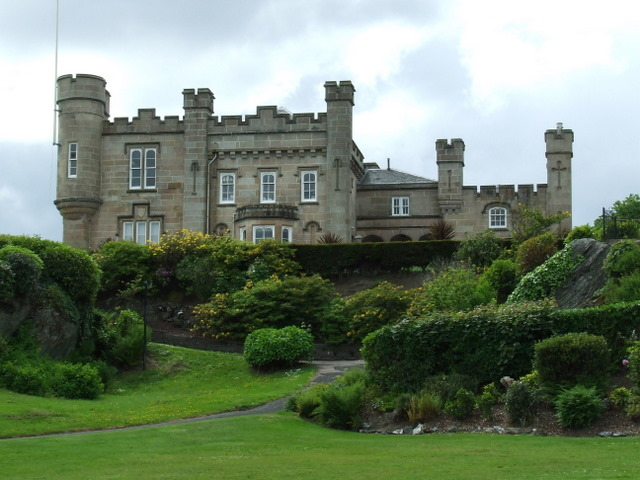
- The castle and its gardens in 2008
- Interactive map of the Castle House area

General information
- Location: Dunoon, Argyll and Bute, Scotland
- Coordinates: 55.946187°N 4.924443°W
- Completed: 1822; 204 years ago

Design and construction
- Architect: David Hamilton

Castle House is situated in the Scottish town of Dunoon, Argyll and Bute. It sits on top of a promontory called Castle Hill, between West Bay and East Bay, overlooking Dunoon Pier and the Firth of Clyde. It was built in 1822, and designed by David Hamilton. It is a Category B listed structure.

== History ==
The house was built for James Ewing of Strathleven. Ewing was a merchant and slave owner and was described by biographer Stephen Mullen as "among the most financially successful of [Glasgow's] élite nineteenth-century sugar/slavery aristocracy". He used the profits from his business to buy and establish property across London. The house was designed by architect David Hamilton who also designed Castle Toward and Hutchesons' Hospital.

Dunoon Town Council purchased the house, for £4,600, in 1893 and used it to house the Council Chamber and Tulloch Free Library.

The flag post on Castle Hill marks the original site of a 13th-century Dunoon Castle.

== Current use ==
The building has been home to Castle House Museum since 1998. It is run by Dunoon & Cowal Heritage Trust.

== Gallery ==
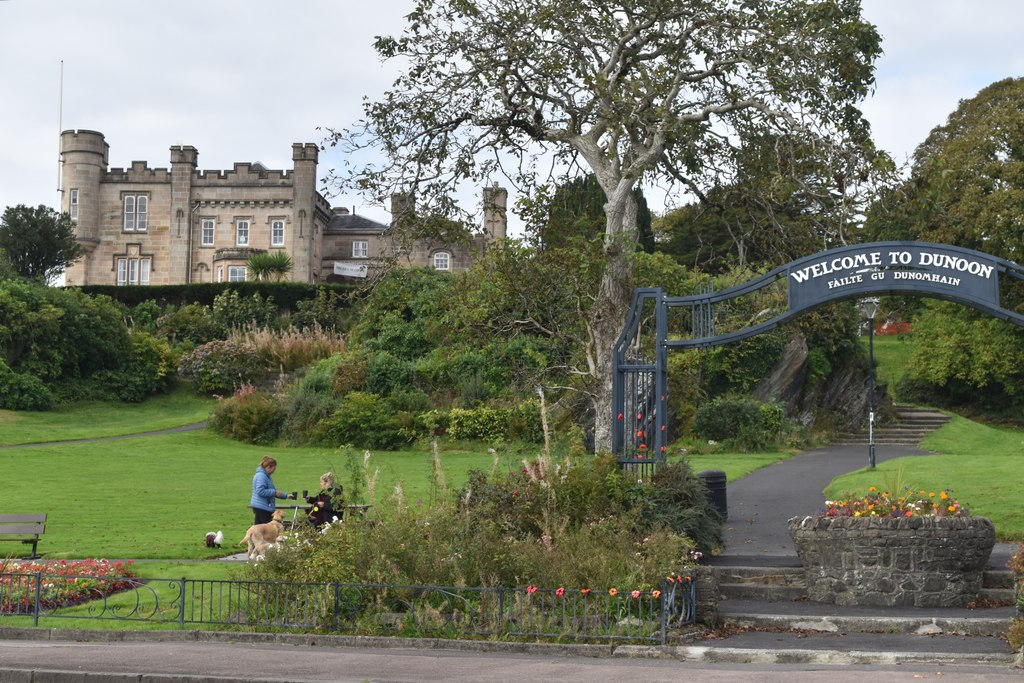
Castle gardens in 2025

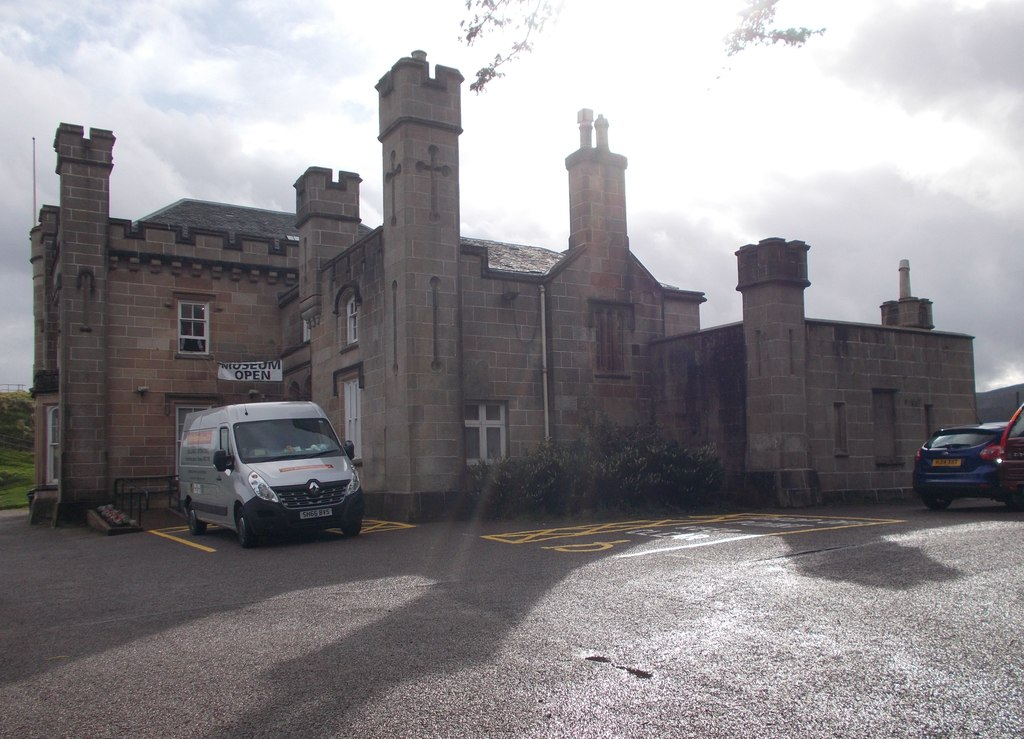
Castle museum in 2019

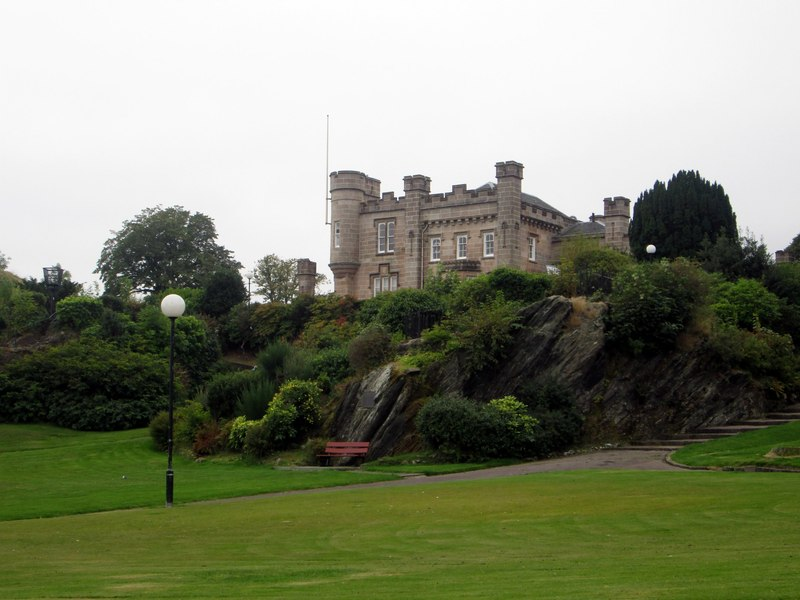
The castle in 2014

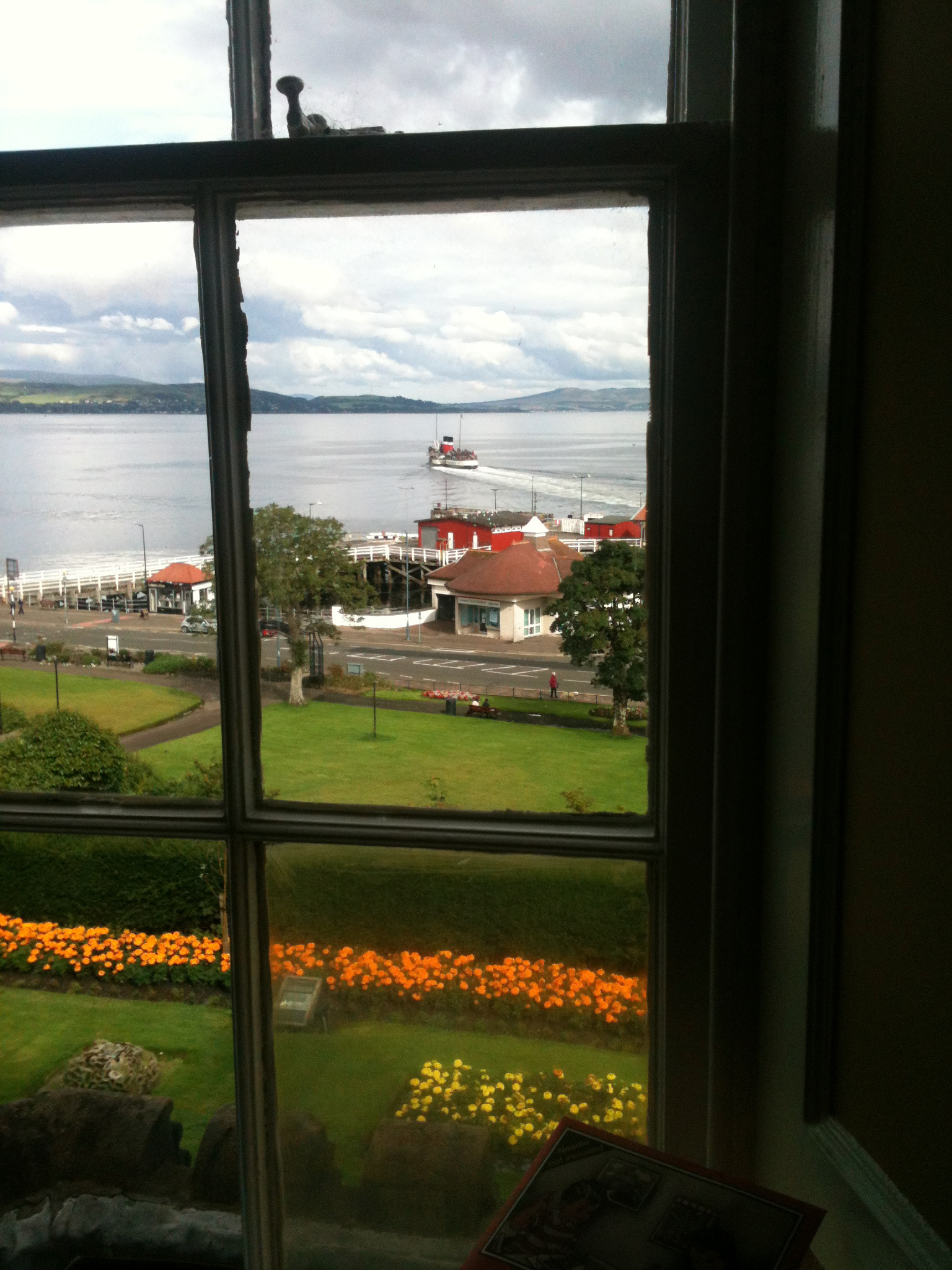
A Caledonian MacBrayne ferry departing Dunoon Pier, viewed from the museum
