= Walter Buchanan (MP) =

British politician

Member of Parliament for Glasgow
- In office 6 March 1857 – 14 July 1865 Serving with Robert Dalglish (April 1857–1865); Alexander Hastie (March 1857–April 1857)
- Preceded by: John MacGregor; Alexander Hastie
- Succeeded by: Robert Dalglish; William Graham

Personal details
- Born: 1797
- Died: 1877 (aged 79–80)
- Party: Liberal/Whig

Walter Buchanan (1797 – 1877) was a British Whig and Liberal politician.

Buchan was elected Whig MP for Glasgow at a by-election in 1857—caused by the resignation of John MacGregor—and, becoming a Liberal in 1859, held the seat until 1865 when he did not seek re-election.

He married Christina Laura Smith, daughter of James Smith of Jordanhill, in 1851; she died in 1853.

Parliament of the United Kingdom
Preceded by John MacGregor; Alexander Hastie	Member of Parliament for Glasgow; 1857–1865; With: Robert Dalglish (April 1857–1865); Alexander Hastie (March 1857–April 1857)	Succeeded by Robert Dalglish; William Graham
