= James Motley =

British botanist and naturalist (1822–1859)

James Motley (2 May 1822 – 1 May 1859) was a Yorkshireman closely associated with South Wales and Borneo.

== Life ==
Born in Leeds, the son of Thomas Motley (1781–1863) and Caroline Osburn (1795–1869), sister of noted Egyptologist William Osburn. James was educated at St Peter's School, York and St John's College, Cambridge. He spent at least some of his youth in South Wales where his father, a woolstapler, had investments in iron, coal, and tin works, being an early partner in the Maesteg Ironworks, Yskyn Colliery at Briton Ferry, Margam tinworks, and the Dafen tinworks at Llanelli. He published a volume of poetry Tales of Cymry in 1848. He worked as an engineer and manager (at Tewgoed (or 'Terrgoed') Colliery at Cwmavon); then underground surveyor to William Chambers of Llanelli; and finally, at Abercrave colliery, iron works, iron mines, and limestone quarries while maintaining an active interest in natural history, especially botany (he left a herbarium at the Royal Institution of South Wales, Swansea), and folklore.

After the family hit substantial financial problems, he went out to Labuan in 1849 to pioneer coal mining and other enterprises for the Eastern Archipelago Company. He was accompanied by his wife and a brother, Francis, and made the most of opportunities to study the natural history. He did not have a good relationship with the other naturalist in Labuan at the time, Hugh Low, but he corresponded with some eminent geologists (including Sir Henry De la Beche who had recommended him for the job in Labuan) and botanists, especially William Jackson Hooker at Kew Gardens, and William Mitten; in Swansea, Lewis Llewelyn Dillwyn arranged publication of a natural history book. He sent specimens to various places (unpaid except for some sold, and later misattributed, to his successor in Labuan, Edmund Scott Barber). The council of the learned society of his home city, the Leeds Philosophical and Literary Society, was especially appreciative of his contributions to their museum, calling him "one of its most useful and disinterested friends".

He left the Eastern Archipelago Company in acrimonious circumstances in 1853 but, after some time in Singapore (where he produced plans for drainage work) and exploring the coast of Sumatra, he obtained a similar job as superintendent of the private Julia Hermina coal mine at Kalangan (or Bangkal), south-east of Banjarmasin in South Eastern Borneo where he, his wife, two daughters, and a son made good progress until a local uprising at the start of the Bandjermasin War cost their lives, along with all the other Europeans living in the area.

Had he lived longer it is arguable that he might have been comparable to his near contemporary in both South Wales and Borneo, Alfred Russel Wallace. They both contributed to Lewis Weston Dillwyn's natural history book presented to participants in the 1848 British Association Conference in Swansea and Wallace actually acquired some specimens of Borneon birds collected by Motley, as recorded by British Museum catalogues of the late 19th century; many other birds he collected are in the Tristram Collection at the World Museum, Liverpool. Some of the ethnobotanical specimens he sent to Kew were transferred to the British Museum and can be seen online.

His name provides the basis for the plant genus Motleyia (belonging to the family Rubiaceae), and the specific name of a number of Malesian plants, the first two being named by Heinrich Wilhelm Schott in 1858, and including the fruit tree Baccaurea motleyana.
