= Glasgow (UK Parliament constituency) =

Parliamentary constituency in the United Kingdom, 1868–1885

- Former burgh constituency for the House of Commons
- Subdivision: City and royal burgh of Glasgow

1832–1885
- Seats: Two (1832–1868); Three (1868–1885)
- Created from: Clyde Burghs
- Replaced by: Blackfriars & Hutchesontown; Bridgeton; Camlachie; College; Central; St Rollox; Tradeston

Glasgow was a burgh constituency of the House of Commons of the Parliament of the United Kingdom from 1832 to 1885. It returned two Member of Parliament (MPs) until 1868, and then three from 1868 to 1885. Elections were held using the bloc vote system.

== History ==
Until 1832, Glasgow had been one of the parliamentary burghs in the Clyde Burghs constituency (also known as "Glasgow Burghs"), which was abolished by the Representation of the People (Scotland) Act 1832. The Act created the new Glasgow constituency with two seats, which was increased to three by the Representation of the People (Scotland) Act 1868.

Under the Redistribution of Seats Act 1885, the constituency was finally divided into seven new single-seat constituencies, with effect from the 1885 general election:

- Glasgow Blackfriars and Hutchesontown
- Glasgow Bridgeton
- Glasgow Camlachie
- Glasgow College
- Glasgow Central
- Glasgow St Rollox
- Glasgow Tradeston

== Boundaries ==
The boundaries of the constituency, as set out in the Representation of the People (Scotland) Act 1832, were-

"From the Point, on the West of the Town, at which the River Kelvin joins the River Clyde, up the River Kelvin to a Point which is distant One hundred and fifty Yards (measured along the River Kelvin) above the Point at which the same is met by the Park Wall which comes down thereto from Woodside Road; thence in a straight Line to a Point on the Great Canal which is distant One hundred Yards (measured along the Great Canal) below Derry Bridge; thence along the Great Canal and the Cut of Junction to the Bridge over the Cut of Junction on the Stirling Road; thence, Eastward, along the Low Garngad Road to a Point which is distant One hundred and fifty Yards (measured along the Low Garngad Road) to the East of the Bridge over the Grimston Burn; thence in a straight Line to a Point on the Road to Edinburgh by Airdrie which is distant One hundred Yards (measured along the said Road to Edinburgh) to the East of the Point at which the same is joined by the Road to Edinburgh through the Village of Westmuir; thence in a straight Line to the Point at which the River Clyde is joined by Harvie's Dyke; thence down the River Clyde to the Point at which the same is joined by the Polmadie Burn; thence up the Polmadie Burn to the Point at which the same is joined by the Little Govan Burn; thence up the Little Govan Burn to the Point at which the same is divided into Two Branches in coming down from Govan Hill; thence in a straight Line to the Eastern Extremity of the Butterbiggins Road; thence along the Butterbiggins Road, and in a Line in continuation of the Direction thereof, to the Kinninghouse Burn; thence in a straight Line to the Sheils Bridge over the Paisley and Androssan Canal; thence in a straight Line to the Point at which the River Clyde is joined by the Plantation Burn; thence down the River Clyde to the Point first described."

== Members of Parliament ==
Election	1st Member	1st Party	2nd Member	2nd Party	3rd Member	3rd Party
1832	James Ewing	Whig	James Oswald	Whig	Only two seats until 1868	
1835	Colin Dunlop	Radical	James Oswald	Whig	Only two seats until 1868	
Feb 1836 by-election	William Bentinck	Whig	James Oswald	Whig	Only two seats until 1868	
May 1837 by-election	William Bentinck	Whig	John Dennistoun	Whig	Only two seats until 1868	
Jun 1839 by-election	James Oswald	Whig	John Dennistoun	Whig	Only two seats until 1868	
1847	John MacGregor	Whig	Alexander Hastie	Whig	Only two seats until 1868	
Mar 1857 by-election	Walter Buchanan	Whig	Alexander Hastie	Whig	Only two seats until 1868	
1857	Walter Buchanan	Whig	Robert Dalglish	Radical	Only two seats until 1868	
1859	Walter Buchanan	Liberal	Robert Dalglish	Liberal	Only two seats until 1868	
1865	William Graham	Liberal	Robert Dalglish	Liberal	Only two seats until 1868	
1868	William Graham	Liberal	Robert Dalglish	Liberal	George Anderson	Liberal
1874	Sir Charles Cameron	Liberal	Alexander Whitelaw	Conservative	George Anderson	Liberal
Jul 1879 by-election	Sir Charles Cameron	Liberal	Charles Tennant	Liberal	George Anderson	Liberal
1880	Sir Charles Cameron	Liberal	Robert Tweedie Middleton	Liberal	George Anderson	Liberal
Mar 1885 by-election	Sir Charles Cameron	Liberal	Robert Tweedie Middleton	Liberal	Thomas Russell	Liberal
1885	Constituency abolished by Redistribution of Seats Act					

== Election results ==
=== Elections in the 1880s ===
By-election, 12 Mar 1885: Glasgow
Party	Candidate	Votes	%	±%
Liberal	Thomas Russell	Unopposed		
Liberal hold				

- Caused by Anderson's appointment as Master of the Mint at Melbourne, Australia.

General election 1880: Glasgow
Party	Candidate	Votes	%	±%
Liberal	George Anderson	24,016	25.6	+1.8
Liberal	Charles Cameron	23,658	25.2	+0.6
Liberal	Robert Tweedie Middleton	23,360	24.9	+8.9
Conservative	William Pearce	11,622	12.4	−6.4
Conservative	James Bain	11,071	11.8	−4.9
Majority		11,738	12.5	N/A
Turnout		35,025 (est)	60.5 (est)	+6.3
Registered electors		57,920		
Liberal hold		Swing		
Liberal hold		Swing		
Liberal gain from Conservative		Swing		

=== Elections in the 1870s ===
By-election, 16 Jul 1879: Glasgow
Party	Candidate	Votes	%	±%
Liberal	Charles Tennant	Unopposed		
Liberal gain from Conservative				

- Caused by Whitelaw's death.

General election 1874: Glasgow
Party	Candidate	Votes	%	±%
Liberal	Charles Cameron	18,455	24.6	N/A
Liberal	George Anderson	17,902	23.8	−3.6
Conservative	Alexander Whitelaw	14,134	18.8	+10.4
Conservative	James Hunter	12,533	16.7	+8.3
Liberal	Alexander Crum	7,453	9.9	N/A
Liberal	Francis Ernest Kerr	4,444	5.9	N/A
Liberal	Joseph Cheney Bolton	169	0.2	N/A
Turnout		29,474 (est)	54.2 (est)	−6.1
Registered electors		54,374		
Majority		5,369	7.1	−3.6
Liberal hold		Swing		
Liberal hold		Swing	−6.0	
Majority		6,681	8.9	N/A
Conservative gain from Liberal		Swing		

- Anderson and Cameron stood to speak "for the interests of temperance, working men, religious freedom and reform". The Whig sect of the local party nominated Bolton and Crum, and Kerr represented "the Irish interest" and Roman Catholicism.

Bolton withdrew before the election.

=== Elections in the 1860s ===
General election 1868: Glasgow
Party	Candidate	Votes	%	±%
Liberal	Robert Dalglish	18,287	28.1	−11.3
Liberal	William Graham	18,062	27.8	−4.6
Liberal	George Anderson	17,803	27.4	−0.8
Conservative	Sir George Campbell, 4th Baronet	10,820	16.7	New
Majority		6,983	10.7	+6.5
Turnout		28,871 (est)	60.3 (est)	−1.3
Registered electors		47,854		
Liberal hold		Swing		
Liberal hold		Swing		
Liberal win (new seat)				

Seat increased to three members

General election 1865: Glasgow
Party	Candidate	Votes	%	±%
Liberal	Robert Dalglish	8,171	39.4	N/A
Liberal	William Graham	6,713	32.4	N/A
Liberal	John Ramsay	5,832	28.2	N/A
Majority		881	4.2	N/A
Turnout		10,358 (est)	61.6 (est)	N/A
Registered electors		16,819		
Liberal hold		Swing	N/A	
Liberal hold		Swing	N/A	

=== Elections in the 1850s ===
General election 1859: Glasgow
Party	Candidate	Votes	%	±%
Liberal	Robert Dalglish	Unopposed		
Liberal	Walter Buchanan	Unopposed		
Registered electors		18,611		
Liberal hold				
Liberal hold				

General election 1857: Glasgow
Party	Candidate	Votes	%	±%
Whig	Walter Buchanan	7,060	37.4	−0.1
Radical	Robert Dalglish	6,765	35.9	N/A
Whig	Alexander Hastie	5,044	26.7	−11.6
Turnout		9,435 (est)	52.1 (est)	+25.1
Registered electors		18,118		
Majority		295	1.5	−15.9
Whig hold		Swing		
Majority		1,721	9.2	N/A
Radical gain from Whig		Swing		

By-election, 6 March 1857: Glasgow
Party	Candidate	Votes	%	±%
Whig	Walter Buchanan	5,792	66.3	−13.9
Radical	James Merry	2,943	33.7	N/A
Majority		2,849	32.6	+15.2
Turnout		8,735	48.2	+21.2
Registered electors		18,118		
Whig hold		Swing		

- Caused by MacGregor's resignation by accepting the office of Steward of the Manor of Northstead

General election 1852: Glasgow
Party	Candidate	Votes	%	±%
Whig	Alexander Hastie	3,209	38.3	+11.7
Whig	John MacGregor	3,140	37.5	+9.5
Peelite	Peter Blackburn	1,681	20.1	New
Whig	William Elliot-Murray-Kynynmound	354	4.2	N/A
Majority		1,459	17.4	+14.0
Turnout		4,192 (est)	27.0 (est)	−13.8
Registered electors		15,502		
Whig hold		Swing		
Whig hold		Swing		

=== Elections in the 1840s ===
General election 1847: Glasgow
Party	Candidate	Votes	%	±%
Whig	John MacGregor	2,193	28.0	N/A
Whig	Alexander Hastie	2,081	26.6	N/A
Whig	William Dixon	1,814	23.2	N/A
Whig	John Dennistoun	1,745	22.3	−10.7
Majority		267	3.4	−0.4
Turnout		3,917 (est)	40.8 (est)	−9.4
Registered electors		9,589		
Whig hold		Swing	N/A	
Whig hold		Swing	N/A	

General election 1841: Glasgow
Party	Candidate	Votes	%	±%
Whig	James Oswald	2,776	33.5	+5.0
Whig	John Dennistoun	2,728	33.0	+4.8
Conservative	James Campbell	2,416	29.2	−14.1
Chartist	George Mills	355	4.3	New
Majority		312	3.8	−2.6
Turnout		c. 4,138	c. 50.2	c. −5.8
Registered electors		8,241		
Whig hold		Swing	+6.0	
Whig hold		Swing	+6.0	

=== Elections in the 1830s ===
By-election, 24 June 1839: Glasgow
Party	Candidate	Votes	%
Whig	James Oswald	Unopposed	
Whig hold			

- Caused by Cavendish-Bentinck's resignation

General election 1837: Glasgow
Party	Candidate	Votes	%	±%
Whig	William Cavendish-Bentinck	2,767	28.5	+8.1
Whig	John Dennistoun	2,743	28.2	+7.8
Conservative	James Campbell	2,124	21.8	+4.4
Conservative	Robert Monteith	2,090	21.5	+4.1
Majority		619	6.4	+0.4
Turnout		c. 4,862	c. 56.0	c. −13.2
Registered electors		8,676		
Whig hold		Swing	+1.9	
Whig gain from Radical		Swing	+1.8	

By-election, 27 May 1837: Glasgow
Party	Candidate	Votes	%	±%
Whig	John Dennistoun	3,049	57.0	+16.2
Conservative	Robert Monteith	2,298	43.0	+18.6
Majority		751	14.0	+8.0
Turnout		5,347	61.6	−7.6
Registered electors		8,676		
Whig hold		Swing	−1.2	

- Caused by Oswald's resignation

By-election, 17 February 1836: Glasgow
Party	Candidate	Votes	%	±%
Whig	William Cavendish-Bentinck	1,995	68.8	+28.0
Radical	George Mills	903	31.2	−3.6
Majority		1,092	37.6	+31.6
Turnout		2,898	32.9	−36.3
Registered electors		8,819		
Whig gain from Radical		Swing	+15.8	

- Caused by Dunlop's resignation

General election 1835: Glasgow
Party	Candidate	Votes	%	±%
Whig	James Oswald	3,832	40.8	+17.9
Radical	Colin Dunlop (politician)	3,267	34.8	N/A
Conservative	James Ewing	2,297	24.4	N/A
Turnout		5,479	69.2	c. −19.6
Registered electors		7,922		
Majority		565	6.0	+0.6
Whig hold		Swing	+9.7	
Majority		970	10.4	N/A
Radical gain from Whig		Swing	−9.7	

General election 1832: Glasgow
Party	Candidate	Votes	%
Whig	James Ewing	3,214	25.9
Whig	James Oswald	2,838	22.9
Whig	Daniel Sandford	2,168	17.5
Radical	John Crawfurd	1,850	14.9
Radical	John Douglas	1,340	10.8
Whig	Joseph Dixon (MP)	995	8.0
Majority		670	5.4
Turnout		c. 6,203	c. 88.8
Registered electors		6,989	
Whig win (new seat)			
Whig win (new seat)			
