= Loch Ascog =

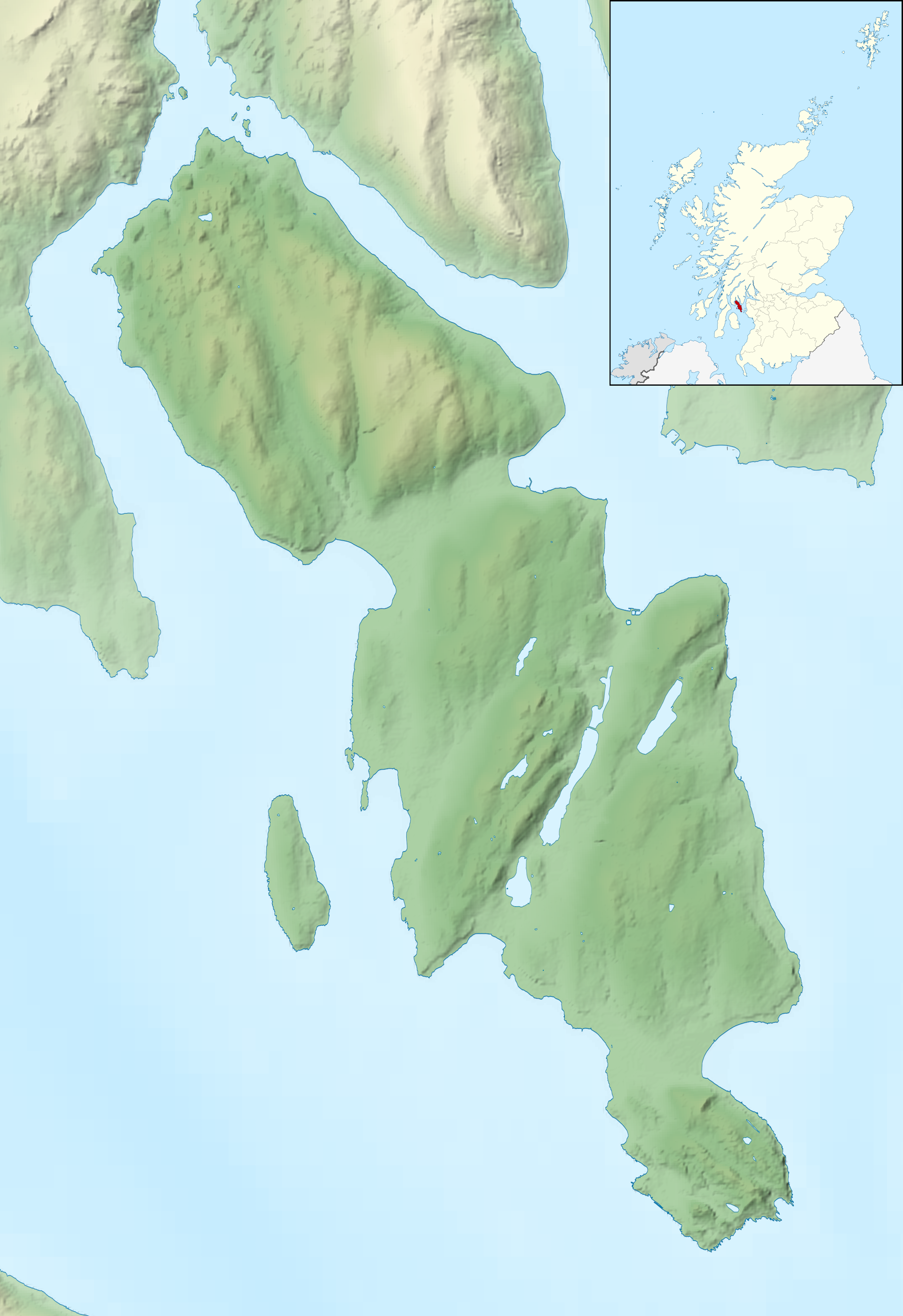
- Location within Bute
- Location: Rothesay, Scotland
- Coordinates: 55.8178°N 5.0448°W
- Type: Reservoir
- Basin countries: Scotland, United Kingdom
- Surface area: 447,353 m^{2} (4,815,270 sq ft)
- Water volume: 1,202,000 m^{3} (974 acre⋅ft)
- Surface elevation: 34 m (112 ft)

Loch Ascog is a small reservoir on the east coast of the island of Bute, in the council area of Argyll and Bute, Scotland. The loch supplies water to the town of Rothesay and the fishing rights are held by the Isle of Bute Angling Association. Loch Ascog is 44.7 hectares (110 acres) in extent. To the west is the much larger Loch Fad.

== See also ==
- Ascog House
- List of lochs in Scotland
- List of reservoirs and dams in the United Kingdom
