= Robert Tweedie Middleton =

Scottish politician

Middleton in 1880

Robert Tweedie Middleton (5 December 1831 – 9 December 1891) was a Scottish Liberal politician who sat in the House of Commons from 1880 to 1885.

Middleton was the son of James Middleton of Glasgow and his wife Mary Tweedie, daughter of Robert Tweedie. He was a merchant in Glasgow and a J.P. for Lanarkshire and Dumbarton.

Middleton put himself forward as a parliamentary candidate at Glasgow in 1879 but withdrew to prevent a party division. At the 1880 general election he was elected Member of Parliament for Glasgow. He held the seat until 1885.

Middleton died at the age of 60 and is buried in Glasgow Necropolis.

Middleton married Rachel Milne Watson, daughter of Sir James Watson of Glasgow.

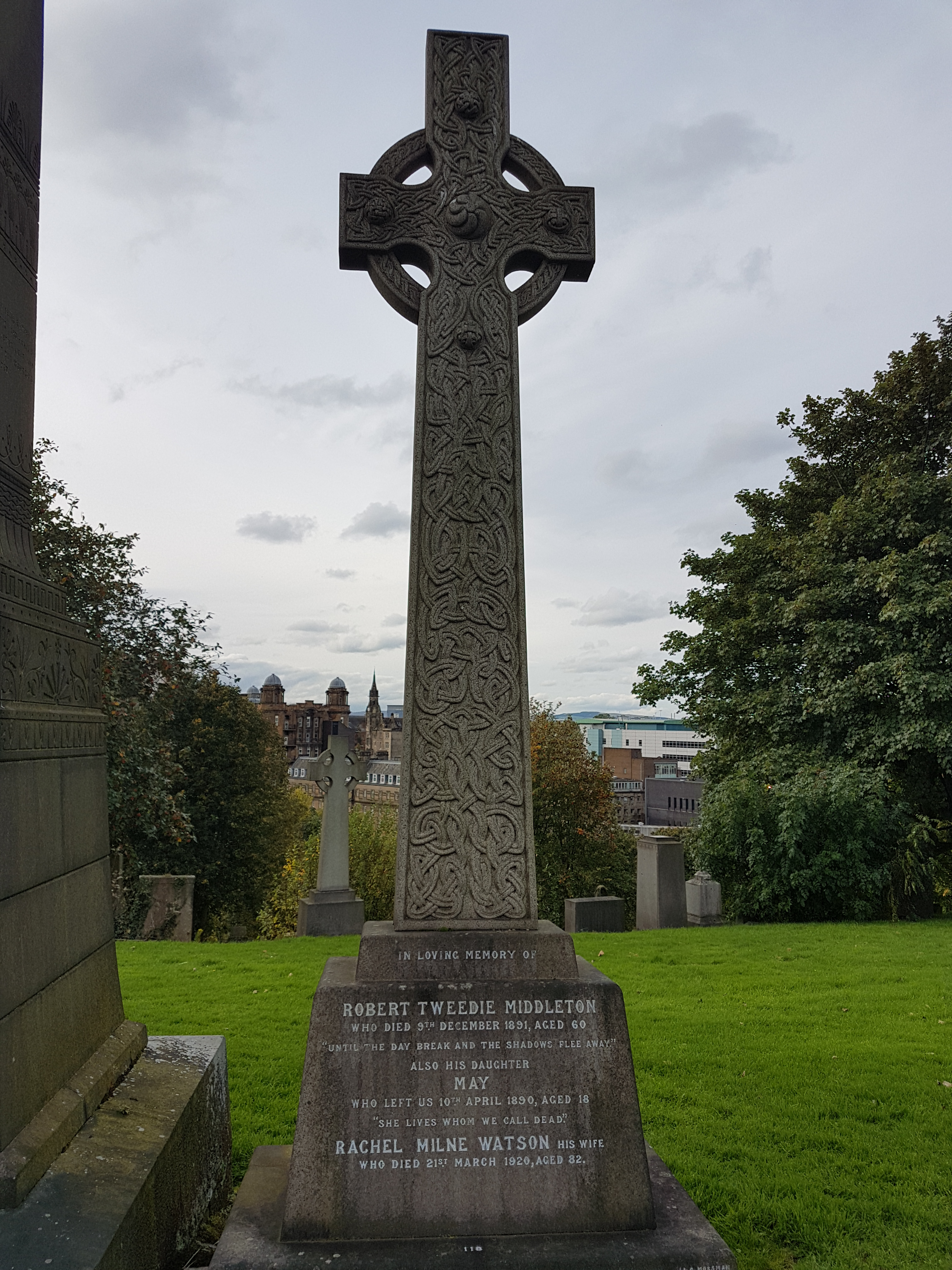
Memorial to Robert Tweedie Middleton, Glasgow Necropolis

Parliament of the United Kingdom
Preceded by Charles Cameron; Charles Tennant; George Anderson	Member of Parliament for Glasgow; 1880 – 1885; With: Charles Cameron 1874–85; George Anderson to Mar 1885; Thomas Russell Mar–Nov 1885	Constituency divided
