= Balmory Hall =

Victorian Italianate mansion on the Isle of Bute, Scotland

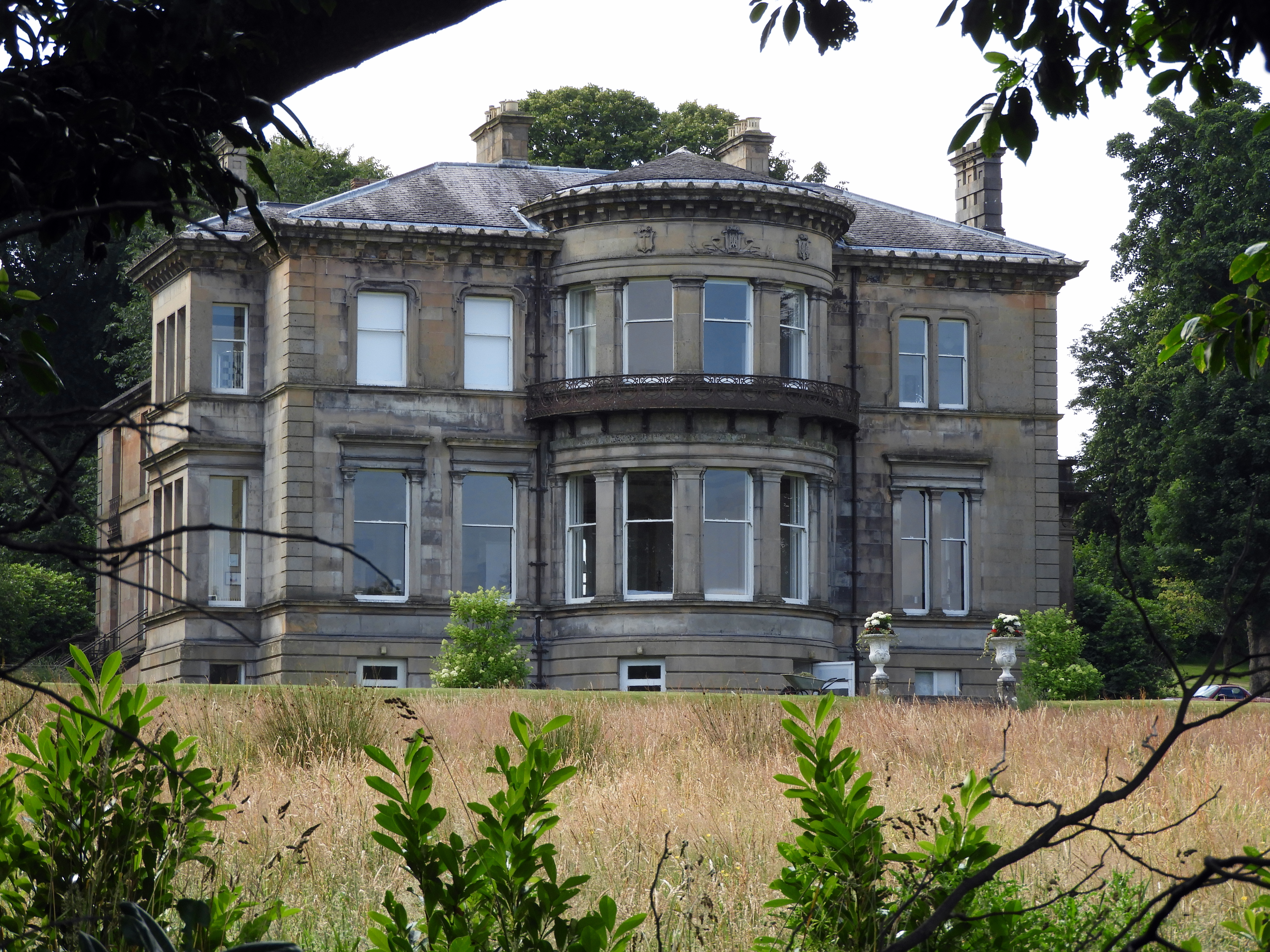

- Location within Bute

General information
- Location: Ascog, Scotland, United Kingdom
- Coordinates: 55.823328°N 5.029°W
- Construction started: 19th century

Balmory Hall is a category A listed Victorian Italianate mansion located near Ascog in the Isle of Bute, Scotland, just west of Ascog House. The hall is set within 6 acres (2.4 ha) of gardens. It is run as a privately owned guesthouse and reportedly features a 7-course breakfast.
