= William Graham (Glasgow MP) =

Scottish politician and merchant (1817–1885)

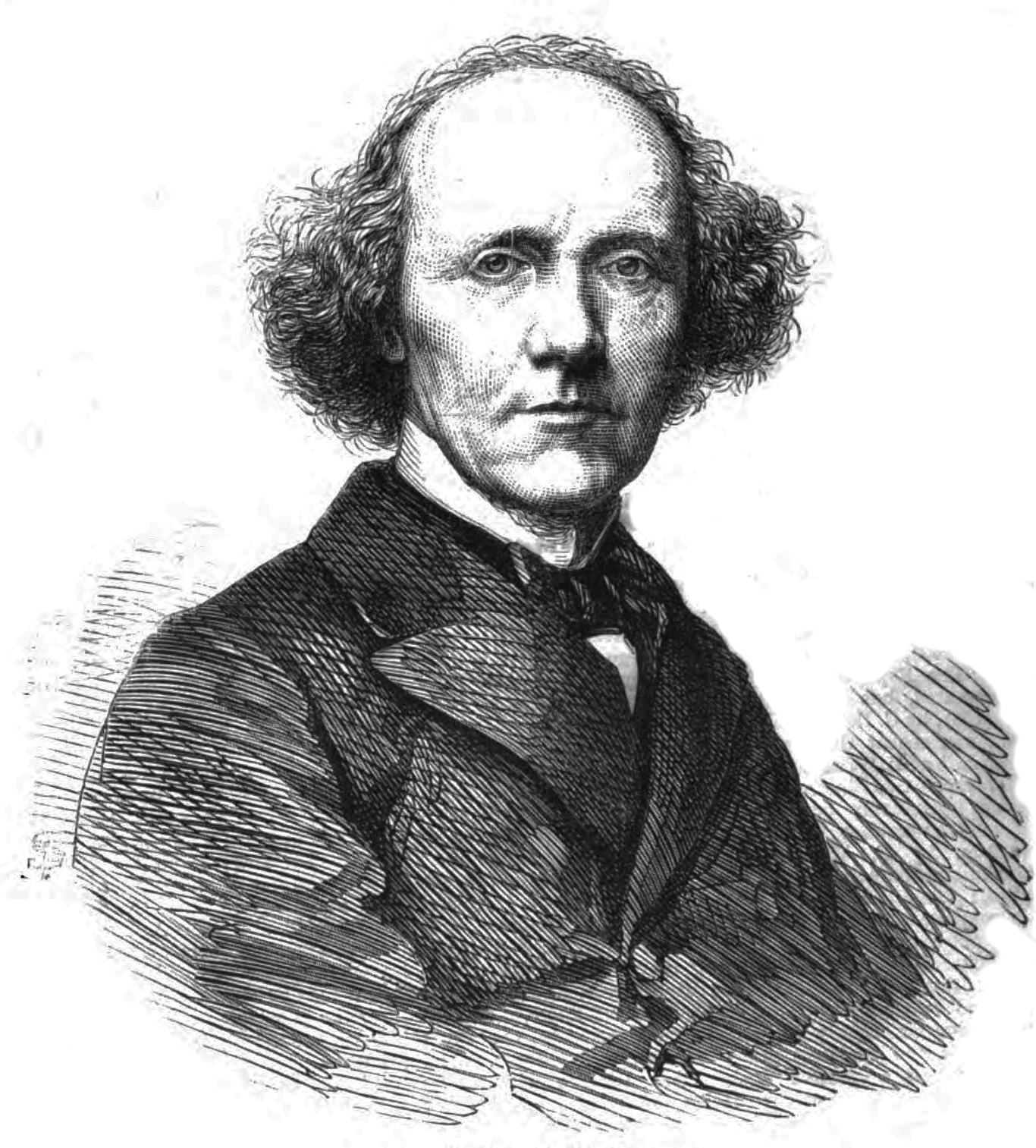
William Graham, 1866 engraving after a photograph

William Graham (1817 – 16 July 1885), Liberal MP for Glasgow, was a Scottish politician, wine merchant, cotton manufacturer and port shipper. He is remembered as a patron of Pre-Raphaelite artists like Edward Burne-Jones and Dante Gabriel Rossetti and a collector of their works.

== Art collector ==
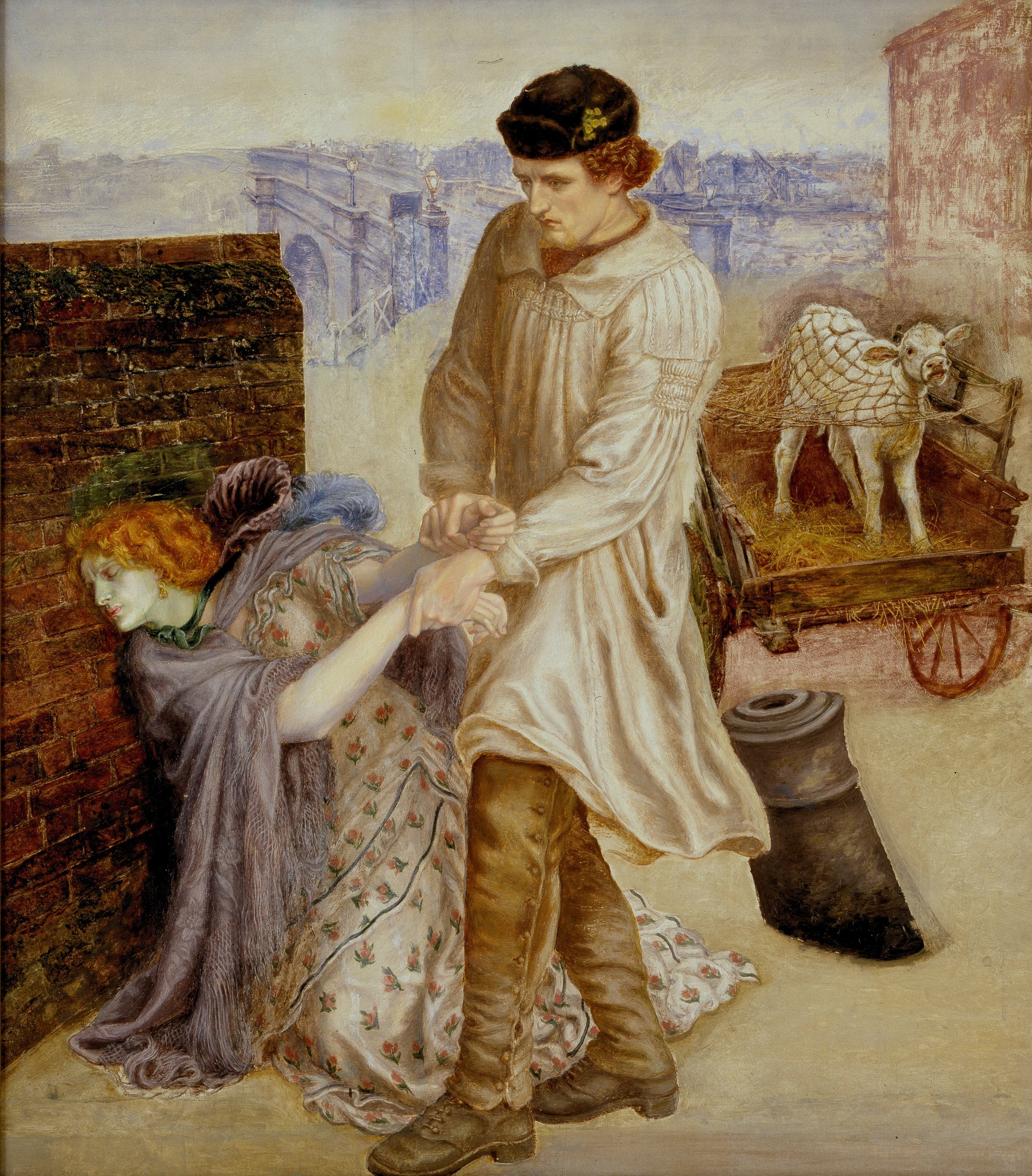
Found (unfinished), by Dante Gabriel Rossetti, Delaware Art Museum

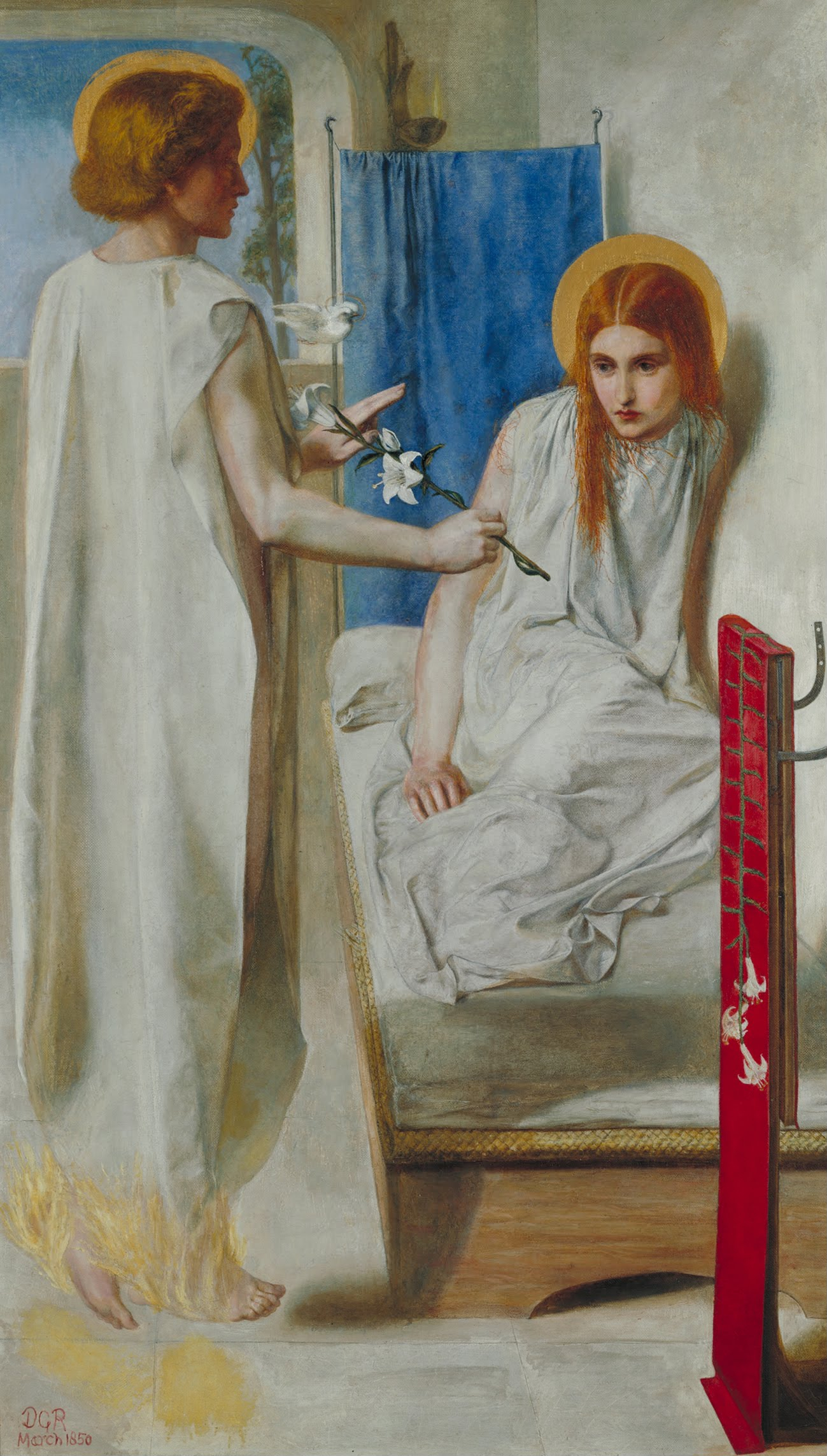
Ecce Ancilla Domini!, by Rossetti, Tate Britain, London (1850)

Graham's father was the founder of a firm, and in 1810 W & J Graham & Co diversified its business interests when it began importing wines from Portugal. Graham's became one of Britain's most prominent port shippers. Graham was a moderate Liberal, who was elected on 14 July 1865 with Robert Dalglish (1808–1880) in Glasgow. He was re-elected in 1868 with Dalglish and George Anderson (1819–1896) in the party's great Glasgow triumph in the general election of 1868 when Glasgow's electoral representation was raised from two to three MPs.

Graham was a friend and patron of Edward Burne-Jones since 1856. Graham bought several of Burne-Jones's works and the 1886 sale of his collection allowed new Burne-Jones enthusiasts to acquire coveted pieces. Graham also invited artists such as Burne-Jones and Edward Clifford to his country house, Stobhall, in Perthshire. Clifford in turn acquired three paintings from Graham's collection in 1886.

At Rossetti's persuasion, he commissioned Found for 800 pounds in 1869; the painting remained unfinished, and took possession of the work after the painter's death in April 1882. In 1871, Graham commissioned The Blessed Damozel (1871) from Dante Gabriel Rossetti. He also acquired La Donna Della Finestra (1880) from the artist. Graham began to buy from Rossetti in the mid-1860s. When they came on the market in 1874 and 1885, Graham bought his two Pre-Raphaelite Brotherhood oils, Ecce Ancilla Domini! (1850) and The Girlhood of Mary Virgin (1849) both now in the Tate Gallery. He also commissioned the large Dante's Dream, although this was found to be too big for his London house. Many of the pictures he owned are now in Tate Britain.

From Edward Burne-Jones, Graham also acquired many pieces. In the 1870s, Graham commissioned the two large oils Laus Veneris (Laing Art Gallery, Newcastle upon Tyne) and Chant d'Amour (Metropolitan Museum of Art, New York), which were the most important items in a large collection of Burne-Jones's work, formed from the mid-1860s. The Graham piano was painted by Burne-Jones for Graham's daughter Frances (Mrs. Horner, later Lady Horner); Frances continued her father's role as friend and patron of Burne-Jones. William Morris and Burne-Jones also prepared a copy, one of four, of The Rubaiyat of Omar Khayyam (1859) for Frances.

His importance is not only as a purchaser and a patron, but also as a person whose fine collection of early Italian paintings helped to inspire the artists whom Graham supported such as Rossetti and Edward Burne-Jones. After his death, his collection was sold at auction by Christie's in April 1886.

== Issue and descendants ==
Graham married Jane Catherine Lowndes (1819/1820–1899), and had issue including:

1. Frances Jane Graham (1854/1855–1940), married 1883 John Francis Fortescue Horner, barrister, later Sir John Horner, of Mells Park, Somerset, and had issue:
  1. Katharine Frances Horner (1885–1976) married the barrister Raymond Asquith (killed in action 1916), and was grandmother of the present Earl of Oxford and Asquith. She was a friend of Ronald Knox and Siegfried Sassoon.
  2. Edward Horner (1888 – November 1917), killed in action in the Battle of Cambrai, a member of The Coterie with his brother-in-law.
2. Agnes Graham (1860/1861–1937), married 1881 Herbert Jekyll, later Colonel Sir Herbert Jekyll (1846–1932), brother of the celebrated gardener Gertrude Jekyll. Agnes became a Dame Commander of the Order of the British Empire and a Lady of Justice of the Order of St. John of Jerusalem. They had issue one son who died unmarried (1882–1965), and two daughters:
  1. Barbara Jekyll (1887–1973), married first 1911 the Hon. Francis McLaren, M.P., who was killed in 1917 in the War, and, secondly, in 1922, Colonel B. C. Freyberg, V.C., later Lord Freyberg (1889–1963), and had issue by both husbands. She was named a Dame Grand Cross of the Order of the British Empire (GBE) in 1953.
  2. Pamela Jekyll (1889–1943), married 1908 the Right Hon. Reginald McKenna (d. 1943), and had issue.

== Sources ==
- William Graham MP Archived 7 December 2007 at the Wayback Machine The Glasgow Story.
- Reynolds, K. D. (2004). "Horner [née Graham], Frances Jane, Lady Horner (1854–1940), hostess and patron of the arts". Oxford Dictionary of National Biography (online ed.). Oxford University Press. doi:10.1093/ref:odnb/49524. ISBN 9780198614128. (Subscription, Wikipedia Library access or UK public library membership required.)
- Obituary: Sir Herbert Jekyll Archived 4 April 2009 at the Wayback Machine The Times, 30 September 1932.
- Obituary: Barbara, Lady Freyberg Archived 4 April 2009 at the Wayback Machine The Times, 26 September and 3 October 1973
- Obituary: General Lord Freyberg Archived 4 April 2009 at the Wayback MachineThe Times, 6 July 1963
- Leigh Rayment "THE HOUSE OF COMMONS CONSTITUENCIES BEGINNING WITH 'G'", last updated 4 November 2006. Retrieved 21 January 2008.

Parliament of the United Kingdom
Preceded by Walter Buchanan; Robert Dalglish	Member of Parliament for Glasgow; 1865 – 1874; With: Robert Dalglish 1857–68; George Anderson 1868–85	Succeeded by Charles Cameron; Alexander Whitelaw; George Anderson
