= James Oswald (merchant) =

British politician

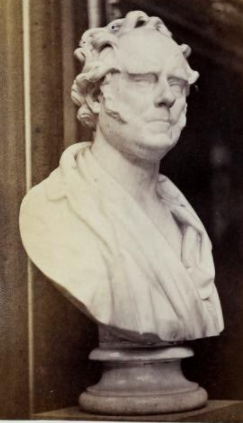
- James Oswald MP by James Fillans

Member of Parliament for Glasgow
- In office 1839–1847
- Preceded by: John Dennistoun; Lord William Bentinck
- Succeeded by: John MacGregor; Alexander Hastie

Member of Parliament for Glasgow
- In office 1832–1837
- Preceded by: New constituency
- Succeeded by: John Dennistoun; Lord William Bentinck

Personal details
- Born: 2 May 1779
- Died: 3 June 1853 (aged 74)
- Parents: Alexander Oswald (father); Margaret Dundas (mother)

James Oswald (2 May 1779 – 3 June 1853) was a Scottish merchant and Member of Parliament (MP) for Glasgow.

== Early life ==
James Oswald was born on 2 May 1779, the fifth child and second son of Alexander Oswald of Shieldhall, Glasgow, and Margaret Dundas, and was the grand-nephew of slave-trader Richard Oswald.

He was the paternal first cousin of Richard Alexander Oswald and paternal uncle of Alexander Haldane Oswald, both Members of Parliament.

On the death of Richard in 1841, James Oswald succeeded to the family estate at Auchincruive, and the estates of Cavens and Preston in Kirkcudbright, by deed of Entail (Fee tail) specified by Richard Oswald.

== Career ==
Shortly after the founding of the Glasgow Bank by Alexander Dennistoun in 1809, Oswald joined other influential merchants there.

Oswald's older brother, Richard Alexander Oswald was also a merchant in Glasgow and together they owned a mill in Barrowfield. In 1812, they formed Oswald, Stevenson & Co., a company formed for mercantile transactions in cottons and yarns, with Nathaniel Stevenson and his brother James. On the death of Richard Alexander Oswald in 1821, James Stevenson took control of the cotton branch while Oswald remained in partnership with Nathaniel for a further nearly 40 years, with Nathaniel's son, James "Croesus" Stevenson, taking over in 1843. Oswald retired from the company, which operated in Glasgow and Manchester, on 31 December 1848. Another of Oswald's business ventures was a company called Oswald, Tennant & Co., which went into bankruptcy due to a "trail of rapid commercial misfortunes connected with India". It is not clear when this occurred, but the company was still trading in 1837

In 1828 James Oswald was on the Committee of the Trustees for the Parish of Govan Prior to becoming an M.P., Oswald commanded the Glasgow squadron of mounted Yeomanry.

James Oswald was Member of Parliament for Glasgow from 10 December 1832 until 26 May 1837, when he accepted the Chiltern Hundreds. Oswald returned to Parliament upon the death of Lord William Bentinck on 24 June 1839, when he stood against Feargus O’Connor, a well known Chartist. Oswald was one of the leading supporters of the movement that led to the Reform Act 1832. and one of the first M.P.'s for Glasgow to be elected by manhood suffrage.

Described as a "powerful orator", and a "steady, consistent, honourable man" who claimed to "always put the interests of my country and cause of reform first" he is credited with 20 recorded contributions in Parliament during his terms of office. It is said that while in Parliament, Oswald "seldom troubled the House unless he had something particular to say".

On 20 February 1833, Oswald was appointed with Sir Robert Peel and others to a parliamentary select committee to classify and prepare abstracts for petitions presented to the house. In February the following year, he was appointed to another select committee to scrutinise the education, practice and usage of the medical profession in the United Kingdom.

Oswald is described variously as a Liberal or Whig. In 1835, he was appointed to the acting committee for the management of the affairs of the Radical Whig Association, formed to protect the interests during a surge in conservative activity. On 16 February 1841 he was appointed to a select committee to investigate the laws concerning the exportation of machinery.

He remained in Parliament until 29 July 1847.

Oswald died on 3 June 1853 at Edinburgh. He was buried at Glasgow Cathedral.

== Artistic recognition ==
In 1856, friends and admirers of Oswald commissioned a statue by Baron Marochetti. Originally erected in Sandyford Place, off Sauchiehall Street, it was moved to the north-east corner of George Square in 1875, after the council were petitioned by his great-nephew, Richard Alexander Oswald. It had long been felt by Oswald's friends and family that he should be accorded the same honour as his political opponent Robert Peel, whose monument had been erected in George Square in 1859. He was also sculpted by James Fillans.

Parliament of the United Kingdom
New constituency	Member of Parliament for Glasgow; 1832 – 1837; With: James Ewing 1832–35; Colin Dunlop 1835–36; Lord William Bentinck from 1836	Succeeded by John Dennistoun; Lord William Bentinck
Preceded by John Dennistoun; Lord William Bentinck	Member of Parliament for Glasgow; 1839 – 1847; With: John Dennistoun	Succeeded by John MacGregor; Alexander Hastie
