= Eastern Archipelago Company =

The Eastern Archipelago Company was a company incorporated by British royal charter in 1847. It was active on the island of Labuan off the coast of Borneo from its creation until its dissolution in 1858.

== History ==
Henry Wise, an ex-officer of the East India Company's maritime service turned London merchant acquired the rights to the coal of Labuan from the White Rajah of Sarawak, James Brooke who had in turn obtained the rights from the Sultan of Brunei.

Wise brought about the grant of a royal charter to incorporate this company in 1847:

"...for the purpose of purchasing and acquiring, holding, settling, improving, cultivating and planting, letting, farming, selling, granting, alienating, mortgaging, charging or otherwise dealing with and making a profit of land, tenements and heridatements, and of the produce thereof, in the Islands of Labuan and the lands adjacent, and of working therein all mines, pits and quarries, and getting and raising all coal, stones, earths, ores, minerals and metals, and of trading and trafficking therein and therewith, and also of trading and trafficking with any of the authorities or inhabitants of the said Island and the lands adjacent, and of exporting from the said island or lands adjacent the produce to arise from the premises, or any of them, and of importing therinto such articles as may by the said Company be deemed necessary or expedient for the furtherance of all or any of the purposes aforesaid, and of purchasing or hiring British or other ships for all or any of the purposes aforesaid...",

He then sold the coal rights to the company but his two initial partners resigned when its initial paid up capital had to be confirmed a year later.

Operations began when James Motley was sent to Labuan in 1849. He was to take over the rudimentary coal workings and commence supplies to Royal Navy and East India Company steamers, for which a contract with the British Admiralty was already in place. The company did not provide him with sufficient resources to develop underground works at the same time as supplying the navy and he had to apply for funds from the government. The governor, James Brooke, ruled that the price of coal should be raised temporarily, but omitted to tell the navy who refused to pay and even made deductions for transport to their ships although the contact did not require it. The company hoped to supply P&O China mail ships, but there were complaints about quality as well as quantity which were not helped by friction with the authorities. James Brooke commenced legal action in 1850 to have the charter revoked: the confirmation of the grant of the charter in 1848 was ruled fraudulent in 1852 but the company considered this a technicality.

Several people were sent to enquire into Motley's work before Edmund Scott Barber arrived as Resident Director to manage him in 1853. As he appeared to be both less competent and much more highly remunerated, Motley soon left, penniless, but Barber died of fever soon afterwards. He was followed by John Radford, who died in 1856, and the company was wound up in 1858.
