= John MacGregor (Glasgow MP) =

Scottish statistician and politician

John MacGregor (1797–1857) was a Scottish statistician and politician.

== Early life ==
MacGregor was born at Drynie, near Stornoway, on the Western Isles, Scotland, the eldest son of Janet (née Ross) and David MacGregor. The family emigrated to Canada in 1803, sailing to Pictou, Nova Scotia. In 1806, they moved to Covehead on Prince Edward Island. As a young man MacGregor set up as a merchant in Charlottetown. In 1822, he served in the office of high sheriff; he was dismissed as a result of involvement in the dealings of Charles Douglass Smith. Put on trial at Smith's behest, he became popular and in 1824 a member of the House of Assembly. He left Canada, travelling through North America, collecting statistics.

== Return to the UK ==
Returning to the UK, MacGregor set up as a commission agent in Liverpool, in 1827.

In 1836, MacGregor reported to the Board of Trade on the Zollverein. In 1839 he represented the British government in the negotiations with the Kingdom of Naples for a revision of the commercial treaty of 1816. In 1840 he succeeded James Deacon Hume as one of the joint secretaries of the Board of Trade. A strong free-trader, he prompted Joseph Hume's motion for a select committee on import duties, and gave evidence before the committee (July 1840), against protectionism.

== In politics ==
On the repeal of the Corn Laws, MacGregor gave up his post at the Board of Trade, and entered parliamentary politics, He was elected as a Whig Member of Parliament for Glasgow in July 1847, resigning in 1857 shortly before his death, by becoming Steward of the Manor of Northstead. He spoke frequently on commercial, financial, and colonial questions.

== In business ==
MacGregor was the principal promoter and sometime chairman of the Royal British Bank, incorporated by royal charter in 1849. Though it was far from prosperous, he shamelessly puffed it, in a chapter on "Banking" contributed to Edwin Troxell Freedley's Money in 1853. He was also a party to the publication of accounts which concealed the true position of the bank. This was not the only occasion on which he lent his status as an MP to companies; and the Eastern Archipelago Company, as well as the Royal British Bank, gave rise to a fraud trial. He lived at 61 Ennismore Gardens, London, from 1849 to 1855

The Royal British Bank stopped payment in September 1856, and MacGregor, who had absconded shortly before, died at Boulogne on 23 April 1857, indebted to the bank in the sum of £7,362.

== Works ==
On his return to Europe (about 1828) he published Historical and Descriptive Sketches of the Maritime Colonies of British America, London, 1828; and Observations on Emigration to British America, London, 1829. In 1830 he made a tour on the continent of Europe, and published a travel book based on it, My Note-book (1835), London, 3 vols. With his friend James Deacon Hume, he projected in 1832 a major work on international commercial statistics. It occupied him during the next seven years, during which he visited most of the countries of Europe.

During his tenure of office he made 22 parliamentary statistical reports, in Commercial Tariffs and Regulations of the several States of Europe and America, together with the Commercial Treaties between England and Foreign Countries, published, with appendix, in 8 vols., London, 1841–50; and in A Digest of the Productive Resources, Commercial Legislation, Customs Tariffs, Navigation, Port and Quarantine Laws and Charges, Shipping, Imports and Exports, and the Monies, Weights, and Measures of all Nations, including all British Commercial Treaties with Foreign States, collected from Authentic Records, and consolidated with especial reference to British and Foreign Products, Trade, and Navigation, London, 1844–8, 3 vols.

Karl Marx referred to him as "the celebrated statistical writer" in The Economic Crisis in Europe (1862). He was a member of the Académie de l'Industrie Agricole.

MacGregor also published:

- ‘British America,’ Edinburgh, 1832, 2 vols.
- ‘The Resources and Statistics of Nations, exhibiting the Geographical Position and Natural Resources, the Political Statistics, including the Government, Revenue, Expenditure, the Civil, Military, and Naval Affairs, the Moral Statistics, including Religion and Education; the Medical Statistics, including Comparative Mortality, &c.; and the Economical Statistics, including Agriculture, Manufactures, Navigation and Trade, &c., of all Countries,’ London, 1835.
- ‘The Commercial and Financial Legislation of Europe and America, with a Pro-forma Revision of the Taxation and the Customs Tariff of the United Kingdom,’ London, 1841.
- ‘The Preference Interests, or the Miscalled Protective Duties shown to be Public Oppression, addressed to all classes and parties,’ London, 1841.
- ‘The Commercial Treaties and Tariffs of Prussia and other States of the Germanic Union of Customs,’ London, 1842.
- ‘The Progress of America from the Discovery by Columbus to the year 1846,’ London, 1847, 2 vols.
- ‘Sketches of the Progress of Civilisation and Public Liberty, with a view of the Political Condition of Europe and America in 1848,’ London, 1848.
- ‘Germany, her Resources, Government, Union of Customs, and Power, under Frederick William IV, with a Preliminary View of the Political Condition of Europe in 1848,’ London, 1848.
- ‘Holland and the Dutch Colonies,’ London, 1848.
- ‘Financial Reform, a Letter to the Citizens of Glasgow, with an Introduction and Supplementary Notes,’ London, 1849.
- ‘Sketches, Historical and Descriptive, of the Austrian and Ottoman Empires, including a Concise View of the Rise and Power of Prussia, and Remarks on Russia, France, and the remaining States of Europe,’ London, 1851.
- ‘The History of the British Empire from the Accession of James I, to which is prefixed a Review of the Progress of England from the Saxon Period to the last year of the reign of Queen Elizabeth,’ London, 1852, 2 vols.
- ‘A Synthetical View of the Results of Recent Commercial and Financial Legislation,’ London, 1853
- ‘The Madrai Case,’ London, 1853.
- ‘The Nunnery Question,’ London, 1853.

MacGregor also edited, for Bohn's Standard Library, De Lolme's Constitution of England, with a life of the author, and notes, London, 1853.

Parliament of the United Kingdom
Preceded by James Oswald; John Dennistoun	Member of Parliament for Glasgow; 1847 – 1857; With: Alexander Hastie	Succeeded by Walter Buchanan; Alexander Hastie
