= Alexander Hastie (Lord Provost) =

Scottish Whig politician

Alexander Hastie MP (1805–1864) was a 19th-century Scottish Whig politician who served as Lord Provost of Glasgow from 1846 to 1848. He was MP for Glasgow from 1847 to 1848 and from 1852 to 1857. He was one of the few people to simultaneously have been Lord Provost and MP for the same city.

He was noted as an anti-slavery activist.

== Life ==
He was born on 24 April 1805, the son of Robert Hastie (1774-1827). The family moved to Glasgow around 1815. His father was President of the Glasgow Philosophical Society.

From 1822 to 1827 he lived and worked in Canada.

He worked for the family firm of R. Hastie & Co, based first at Somerville Place and later at 13 John Street in Glasgow. The company traded with America and the East Indies.

In 1837 he joined Glasgow town council as a councillor. At the time of his being Lord Provost in 1846 he lived at 212 Bath Street in the Glasgow city centre.

In 1863 he purchased Luscar House, near Dunfermline in Fife.

He had an attack of epileptic seizure at home in Bath Street in January 1864. He died on 13 August 1864 at Luscar House.

== Family ==
In 1852 he married Ann Napier daughter of Robert Napier of West Sherndon. They had two daughters, Isabella Napier Hastie and Jane Alexia Hastie, an explorer and organiser of a scientific expedition.

In 1873 Isabella ("Ella") (1854-1919) married Thomas Charles Perceval Lefroy and became Isabella Napier Lefroy. She was an author under the name of E. N. Leigh Fry.
