= Ascog House =

Architectural structure in Argyll and Bute, Scotland

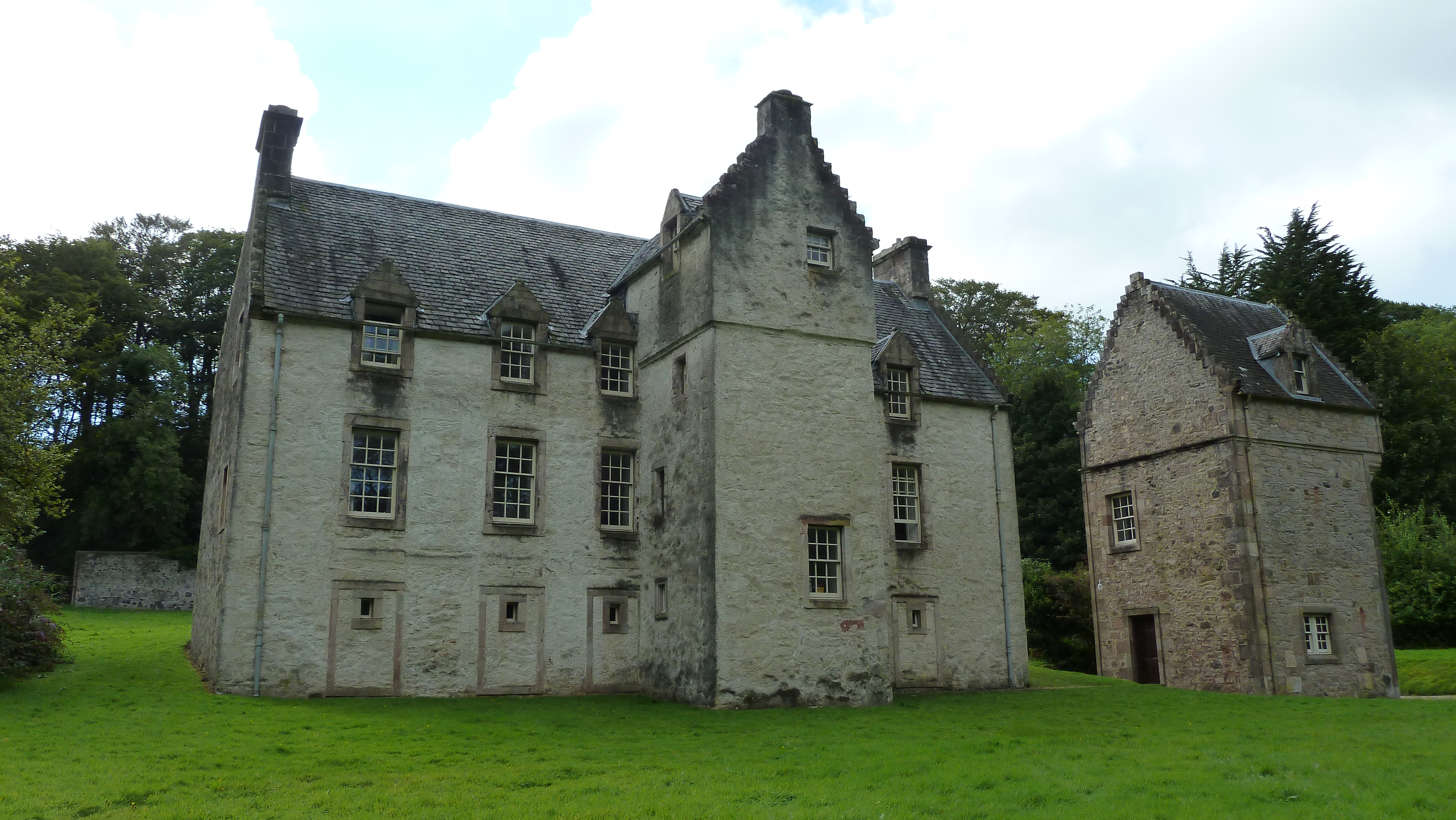
- Ascog House with the Edwardian stair turret

- Location within Bute

General information
- Location: Ascog, Scotland
- Coordinates: 55.8233°N 5.0274°W
- Construction started: Before 1678

Ascog House is a large 17th-century mansion house at Ascog on the Isle of Bute, southwest Scotland. The house is in the care of the Landmark Trust, and is protected as a category B listed building. Balmory Hall lies just to the west of the house.

== Description ==
The present building is a large three-story house running north–south. On the east side is a stair turret with a small watch-chamber above. The roofs are steep with crow-stepped gables. One dormer bears the date 1678.

The building is similar in style and date to the Mansion House in nearby Rothesay, and is likely to have been built by the same architect.

The interior of the house dates from the 1990s restoration. The earlier interiors were mostly lost when the building was divided into flats, and further damage occurred when a fire broke out in June 1991 while the restoration was in progress.

== Architectural history ==
There is no trace of the earlier castle that was only a "few minutes walk" away. (Although a ruined tower named "Ascog Castle" exists, it is not on the Isle of Bute but in mainland Argyll.)

The present building was originally an L-plan tower house, with a projecting watch-chamber above the staircase, from which "missiles could be dropped on unwelcome and unsuspecting guests". Buildings of this type typically date from around 1600.

The stonework of the house bears witness to various changes to the floor levels and layout over the course of the building's history. The windows were enlarged in the 18th century.

During the reign of Victoria, a large servants' wing was added at the back; and during the reign of Edward VII, a drawing room and staircase were added on the north side.

By 1970 the house had been divided into flats, but structural problems set in. Parts of the house became derelict, and the west wall was in danger of collapse.

A programme of restoration was carried out in the early 1990s by the Landmark Trust. This included the removal of the Victorian wing, and most of the Edwardian additions. The Edwardian staircase was left "in detached whimsy" as a free-standing turret containing an additional bedroom.

== Ownership history ==
In 1594, John Stewart of Kilchattan bought the Ascog estate, and may have been the builder of the first house on the site.

In 1673, his grandson, also named John Stewart, married Margaret Cunningharn. They may have been responsible for the rebuilding and enlargement that lead to the carved date 1678.

In 1773 or 1763 the then owner, another John Stewart, wrote a will setting up a complicated entail to ensure that the house remained in the Stewart family.

When he died without children, the house and estate passed to a distant relative Archibald MacArthur of Milton, an advocate who changed his name to Archibald MacArthur Stewart. This inheritance was noted by a contemporary writer, who stated that he was an eccentric, "exceedingly parsimonious", and that "he had a great attachment to swine, and kept a litter of pigs in his bedroom".

He also died without children, and the heir was an American citizen, Frederick Campbell. Under the terms of the will he had to change his name to Stewart and to become a British citizen. This took ten years and required a Special Act of Parliament. He then tried to sell the Ascog estate, at which point a number of claimants emerged, insisting that under the terms of the entail they would be entitled to a share of the proceeds. Litigation ensued, in the course of which Frederick died.

The next heir was Frederick's brother Ferdinand Campbell. He succeeded where his brother had not: in only a short time he managed to become a British citizen, had the House of Lords overturn the old will, and, in 1831, sold the estate. It was acquired by Robert Thom, a civil engineer, who then styled himself "Laird of Ascog".

After Thom, the ownership is less well documented, but in 1939 the house was bought by the 5th Marquess of Bute for housing estate workers.

The house was acquired by the Landmark Trust in 1989 and the building is now maintained using income from its use as holiday accommodation.
