= Robert Dalglish (merchant) =

Scottish merchant and calico printer (1770–1844)

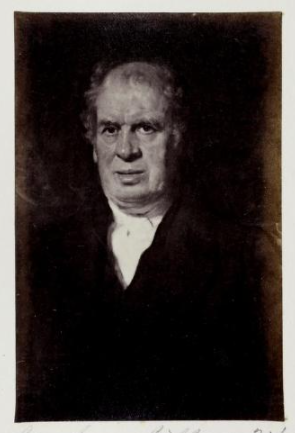
Robert Dalglish, Lord Provost of Glasgow

Robert Dalglish (1770–1844) was a Scottish merchant and calico printer who served as Lord Provost of Glasgow from 1830 to 1832.

== Life ==
He was born in Glasgow in 1770 and apprenticed around 1784 to Andrew Stephenson a muslin manufacturer on Bell Street.

In 1803, with his brother Alexander Dalglish and friend Patrick Falconer, bought 33 Scots acres of land from John Lennox (the land then known as Lennoxfield) and the wider area known as Lennoxtown.

He was a partner in the firm Dalglish Falconer & Co. running the Lennoxmill Printfield warehouse at 27 Ingram Street in Glasgow. Dalglish lived at 25 St Vincent Place in the city centre.

He became a Glasgow town councillor in 1825 and was elected as Lord Provost in 1830.

By the time of his death, over and above his Lennoxtown premises, he had a muslin manufacturing business and separate calico-printing business, both in the city centre.

He died in Glasgow on 5 January 1844.

== Artistic recognition ==
He was portrayed by John Graham-Gilbert.

== Family ==
He married Jean Clyde at the Barony Church in 1791.

His son Andrew Stephenson Dalglish (1793–1858) was named after his first employer.

He was also father to Robert Dalglish MP (1808–1880).
