= Ardnadam Farm =

Site of an ancient cromlech in Argyll and Bute, Scotland

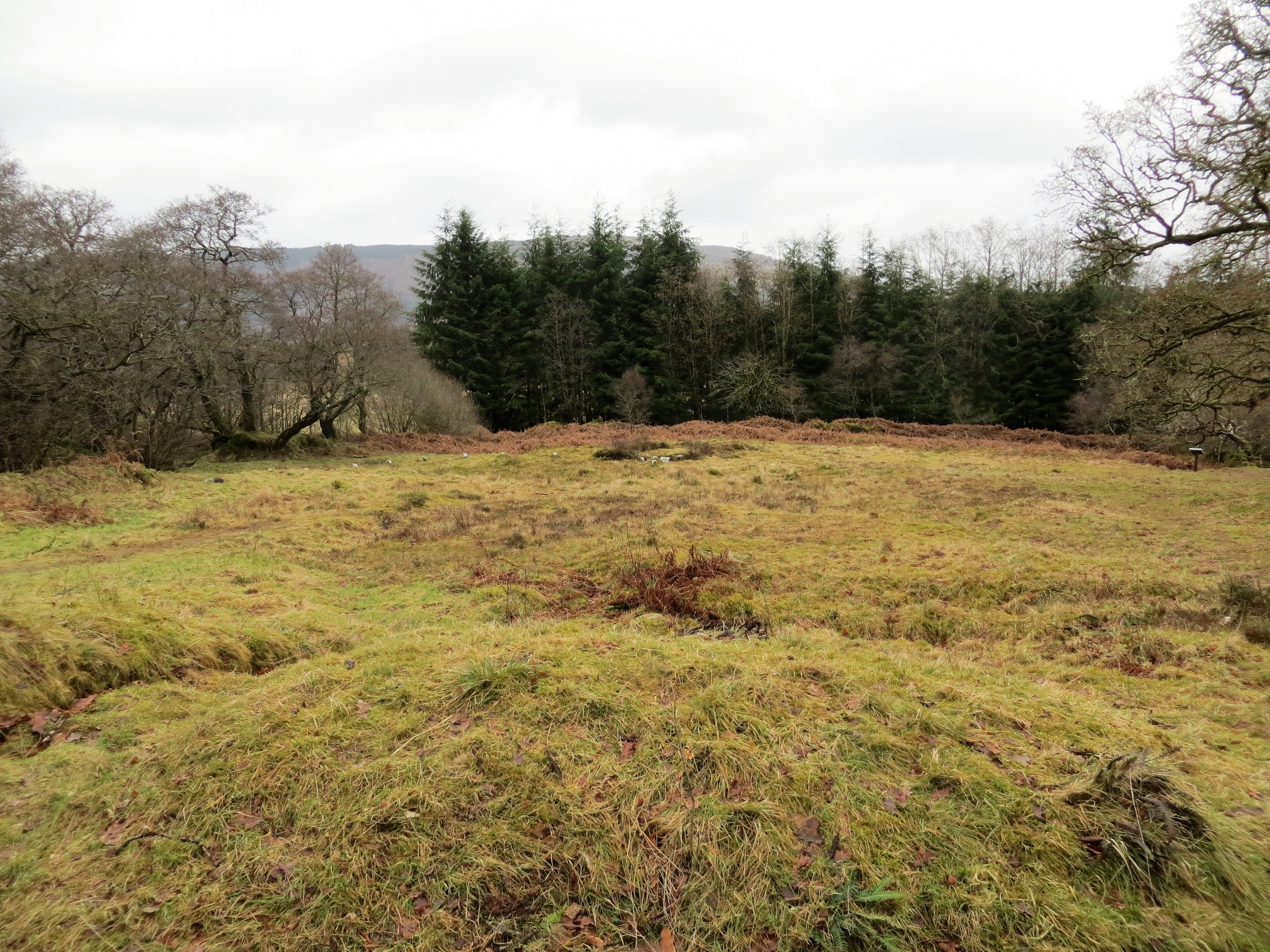
- Field at Ardnadam, the site of Neolithic remains

- Location within Argyll and Bute
- Town/City: Ardnadam
- State: Argyll and Bute
- Country: Scotland
- Coordinates: 55.977856°N 4.947279°W

Ardnadam Farm is the site of an ancient cromlech in the village of Ardnadam, Argyll and Bute, Scotland. The relic was, according to popular tradition, the grave of a king who was named after Adam. Ardnadam Farm, located near Loch Loskin, was supposedly so-called in accordance with the tradition. The stones were later considered to be fragments of a Druidical altar.

A nearby street is named Cromlech Road. It runs between Ardnadam's Ferry Road and High Road (the A885) in Sandbank.
