= Lazaretto Point =

Lazaretto Point can refer to the following:

- Lazaretto Point, Ardnadam, Argyll and Bute, Scotland
  - Lazaretto Point War Memorial
- Lazaretto Point Light, Baltimore, Maryland, U.S.
