= Hunters Quay Hotel =

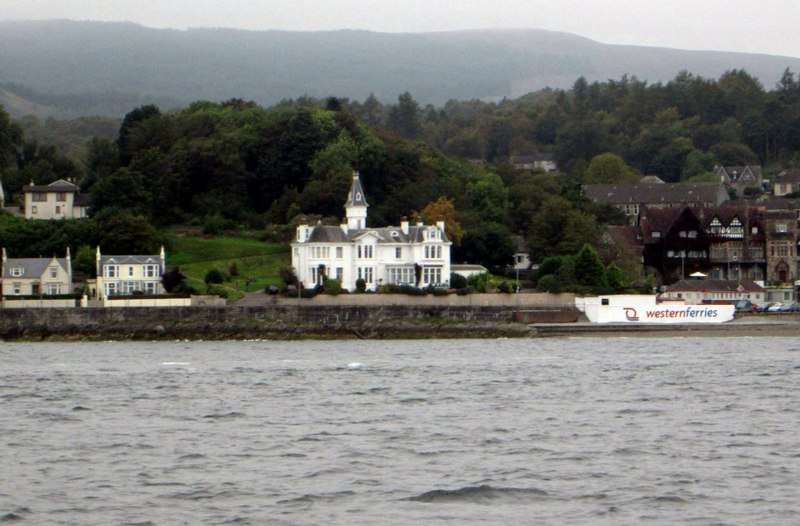
- The hotel pictured from the Firth of Clyde in 2014. The Royal Marine Hotel is in view to the right (north)
- Interactive map of the Hunters Quay Hotel area

General information
- Location: 247 Marine Parade, Hunters Quay, Argyll and Bute, Scotland
- Coordinates: 55.969807°N 4.908997°W
- Opening: c. 1870

Technical details
- Floor count: 3

Hunters Quay Hotel is a hotel located on Marine Parade in Hunters Quay, Argyll and Bute, Scotland. It is a Category C listed building, built around 1870. It sits a few feet to the south of the Royal Marine Hotel.

The building was known as Claver House on the first edition Ordnance Survey map (1862–1877).

Since March 2026 the hotel has new owners and is trading under the name of Lipton House.
