= Argyll Street, Dunoon =

Prominent street in Dunoon, Scotland

Argyll Street
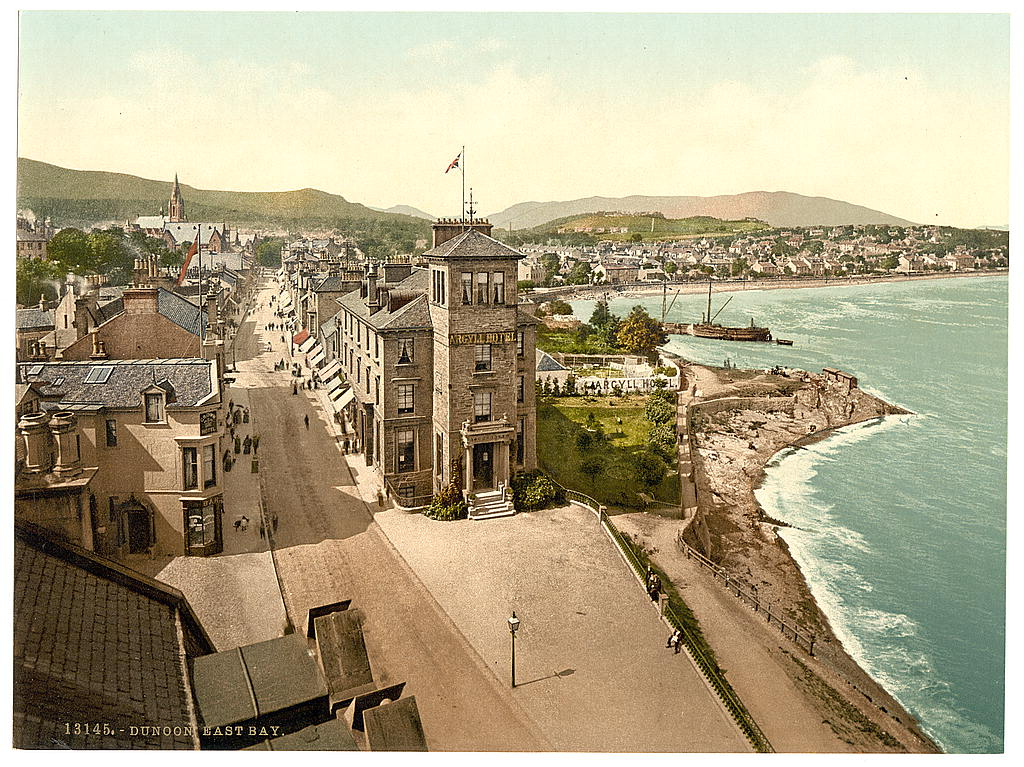
- Dunoon's Argyll Hotel and East Bay around 1895, with Argyll Street on the left
- Interactive map of Argyll Street
- Length: 0.48 mi (0.77 km)
- Location: Dunoon, Argyll and Bute, Scotland
- South end: Pier Esplanade
- North end: Bencorum Brae

Argyll Street is the main street of Dunoon in Argyll and Bute, Scotland. It runs for about 0.9 miles (1.4 km), from Pier Esplanade (the A815) in the south to Bencorum Brae in the north. The road, which is one-way northbound from Pier Esplanade to John Street, forms part of the A885 from John Street to Bencorum Brae, at which point the A885 becomes the Sandbank Road. The road crosses Milton Burn between McArthur Street and Queen Street.

== History ==
In the early 19th century, Argyll Street stopped at Moir Street. Instead of continuing to Dunoon Pier, it turned right at today's Sinbad's Bar. Before Dunoon Burgh Hall was built, beginning in 1873, the land was an open field, owned by James McArthur Moir, leading to an area known as the Gallowhill. There were no streets and houses between Argyll Street and Edward Street. Argyll Street, roughly as it is seen today, was completed by 1870. Moir donated some of his land for the building of the Burgh Hall, but he did not get to see its completion; he died by suicide in 1872.

== Notable locations ==
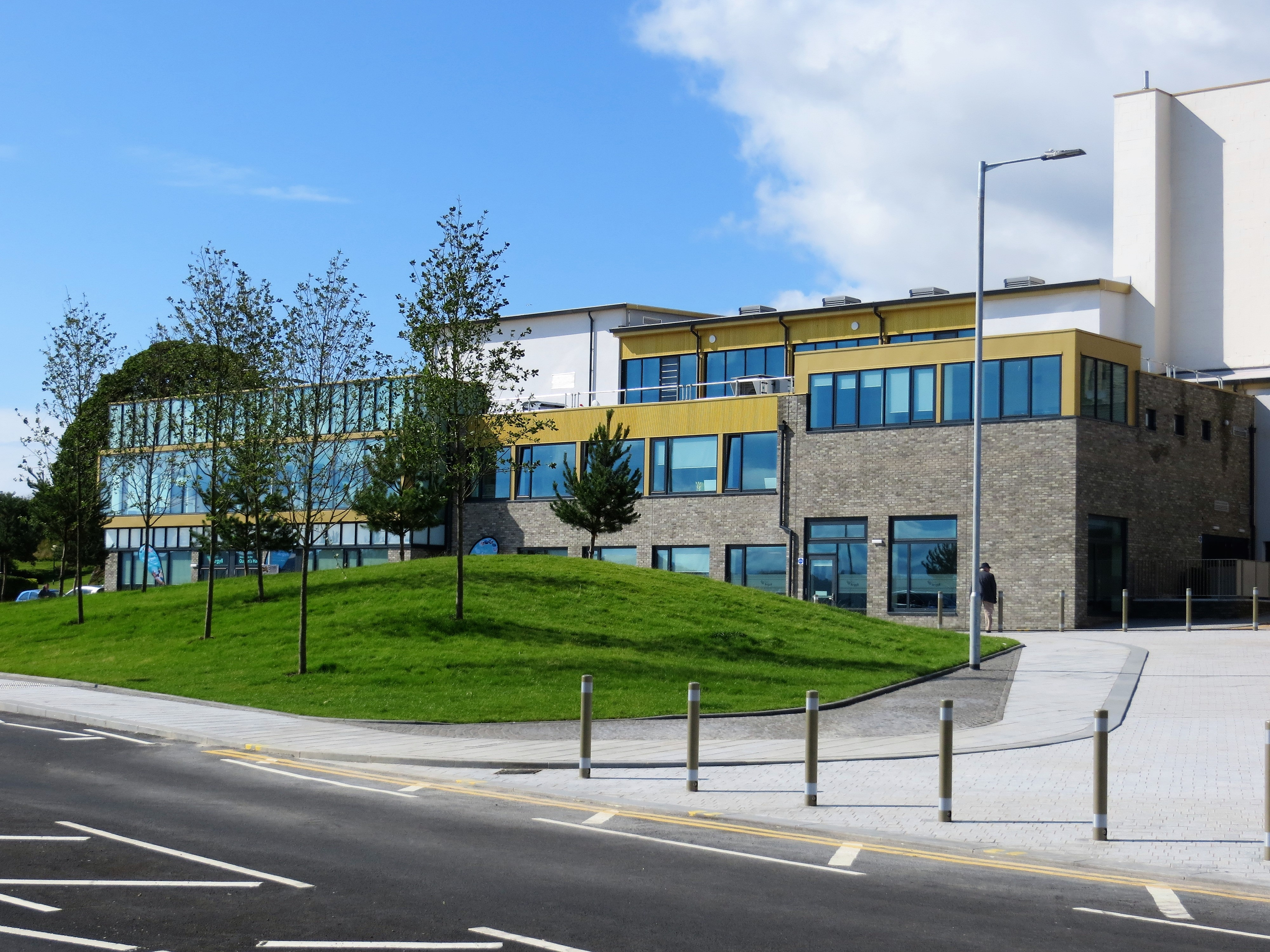
Queen's Hall, post-renovation (2018)

Two buildings on Argyll Street are listed buildings: Argyll Hotel and Burgh Hall. Other notable locations along the street include:

From south to north

- Queen's Hall
- Milton Burn Gardens
- Dunoon Stadium
- Cowal Community Hospital

St Cuthbert's Church stood at today's 191 Argyll Street between 1874 and 1994, when it was demolished to make way for a block of flats. In 2025, it was proposed that the former Dunoon Free Church, at 141 Argyll Street, be converted into a bunkhouse.

== Junctions ==
From south to north

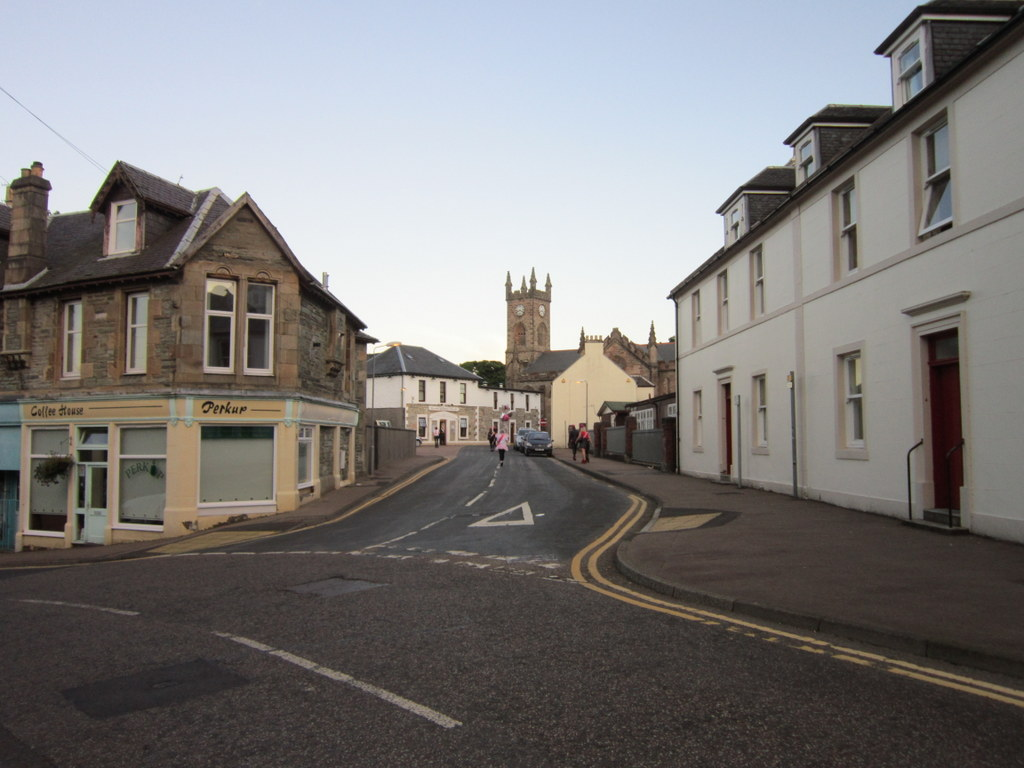
Kirk Brae and the High Kirk

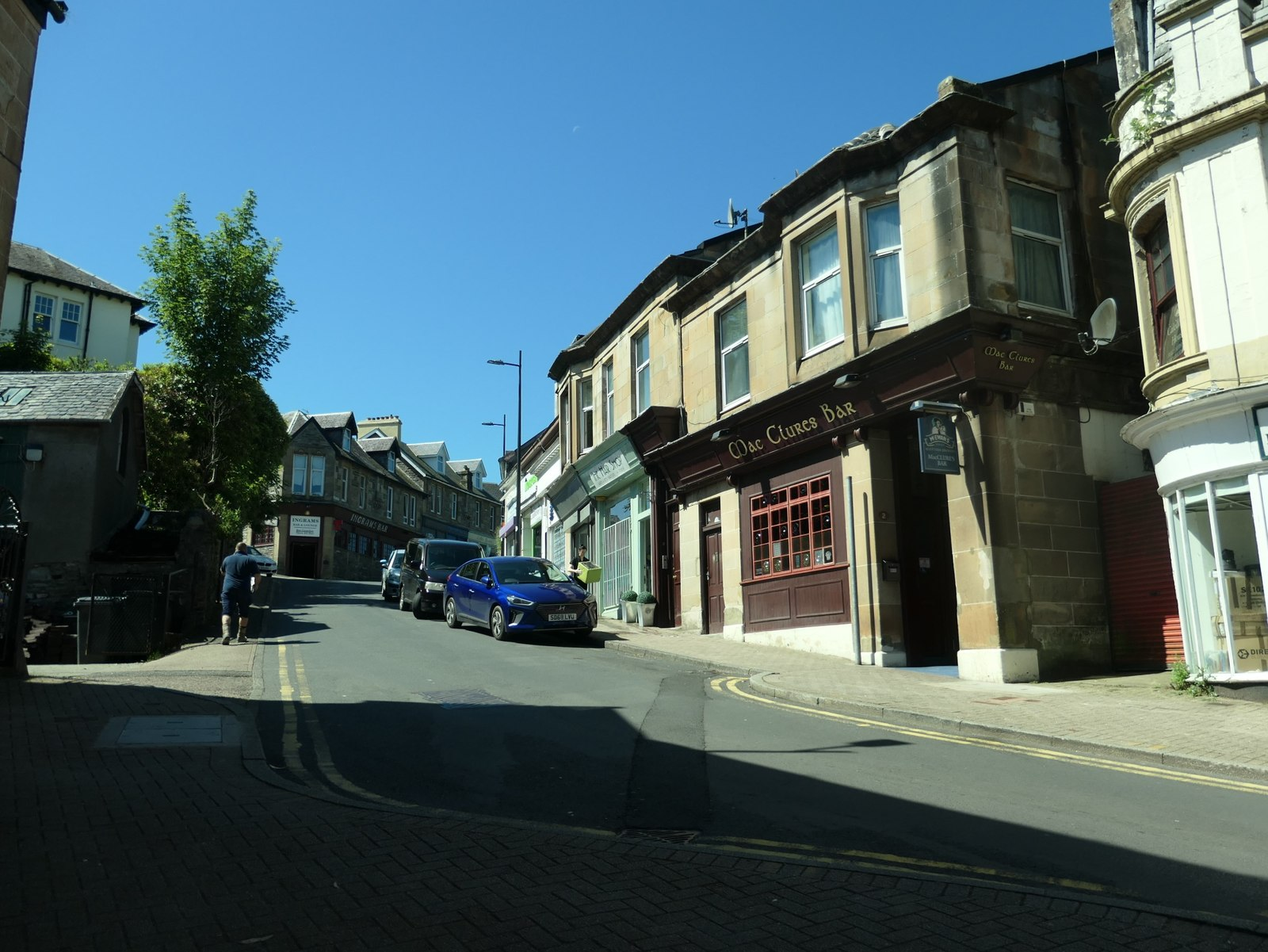
Ferry Brae

- Pier Esplanade
- Kirk Brae (west side)
- Ferry Brae (west side)
- Moir Street (east side)
- Church Street (east side)
- Hanover Street (east side)
- John Street (cross street)
- Alfred Street (west side)
- McArthur Street (west side)
- Queen Street (east side)
- Argyll Road (east side)
- Hamilton Street (west side)
- Bogleha Green (west side)
- Bogleha Road (west side)
- Bencorum Brae (east side)

== In popular culture ==
Dunoon was the inspiration behind Damon Albarn's song "The Selfish Giant" on his 2014 solo album Everyday Robots. It includes the line "Walking down Argyll Street when the evening colours call". Albarn revealed that the inspiration for the song came from Blur's visit to Dunoon in 1995 and a view he had of the Holy Loch. "It was a beautiful misty evening. There was a single submarine in the loch – why it was there I don't know. I had a very strong image of the loch and submarines and walking down the main drag in Dunoon after the gig, going to someone's house for a party, and a song came out of it." Albarn also stated: "Now every time I sing 'The Selfish Giant' I go back to that night in Dunoon, which was a really great night, a fantastic night." When asked if he would consider playing solo in Scotland, he replied: "I’d love to. Maybe Dunoon? Then I can walk down Argyll Street again."
