= Milton Burn =

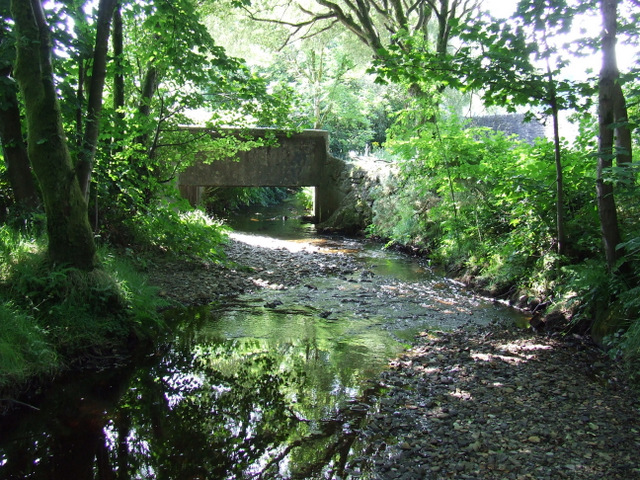
- The burn running beneath Bogleha Road in Dunoon

Physical characteristics
- Source: Loch Loskin
  - location: Kirn, Argyll and Bute
  - coordinates: 55.9660656°N 4.93395878°W
- Mouth: Firth of Clyde
  - location: Cowal
  - coordinates: 55.9530100°N 4.9198050°W
  - elevation: Sea level
- Length: 1.02 m (3 ft 4 in)
- Discharge
  - location: Dunoon, Argyll and Bute

Milton Burn is a watercourse in Argyll and Bute, Scotland. It is sourced from Loch Loskin in Kirn and largely runs parallel to the A885 road as it leads south to Dunoon. It is around 1.02 miles (1.64 km) long.

It is crossed by several roads during its southward flow: Sandbank Road, Hamilton Street, Argyll Street, Pilot Street, Milton Road and George Street. It disappears beneath Alexandra Parade immediately before its discharge into the Firth of Clyde between Queen Street and Milton Road in Dunoon's East Bay.

Milton Burn forms a natural little harbour in the lovely shore of Dunoon, then almost tenantless, and without visible habitations of man — but now studded with so many dwellings of kindness and comfort.

— Thomas Atkinson, The Chameleon (1833), p. 319

East Bay was originally named Milton Bay by James MacArthur Moir, a miller who became laird of Milton. In 1884, the burn is mentioned as being crossed by Mill Street, which no longer exists. Milton Mill was situated on the burn between Milton Road and George Street. Milton was the name of the estate on which Dunoon was partly built.

In 1885, The Scottish Law Reporter also wrote:

Leading out of Dunoon there is a street now only partly formed, intersected by a burn called the Milton Burn, over which there was an old wooden bridge. This was considered dangerous, and was removed by the commissioners, and replaced by a stone bridge.

In July 1989, the body of 25-year-old Gourock resident Joyce Hepburn was found in the burn near George Street. Hundreds of sailors stationed at the nearby Holy Loch were questioned by police, as many of them came ashore on leave every second Thursday after receiving their wages. Witnesses recalled seeing a male and a female arguing in George Street, above the point where Hepburn's body was later found. The body of Ivan Miller, Hepburn's fiancé and a United States Navy dental technician, was found a week later in the hills behind Dunoon. He had committed suicide.

Eight months of flood prevention work began around the burn in June 2011. A culvert was connected to the burn via a weir, allowing water to be removed from the burn during and after heavy rainfall.

A whisky distillery is believed to have stood beside the burn near where it is crossed by Argyll Street.

The burn flows through Milton Burn Gardens, which was created on the eastern side of Argyll Street between Queen Street and John Street.
