= Lazaretto Point War Memorial =

- Scotland
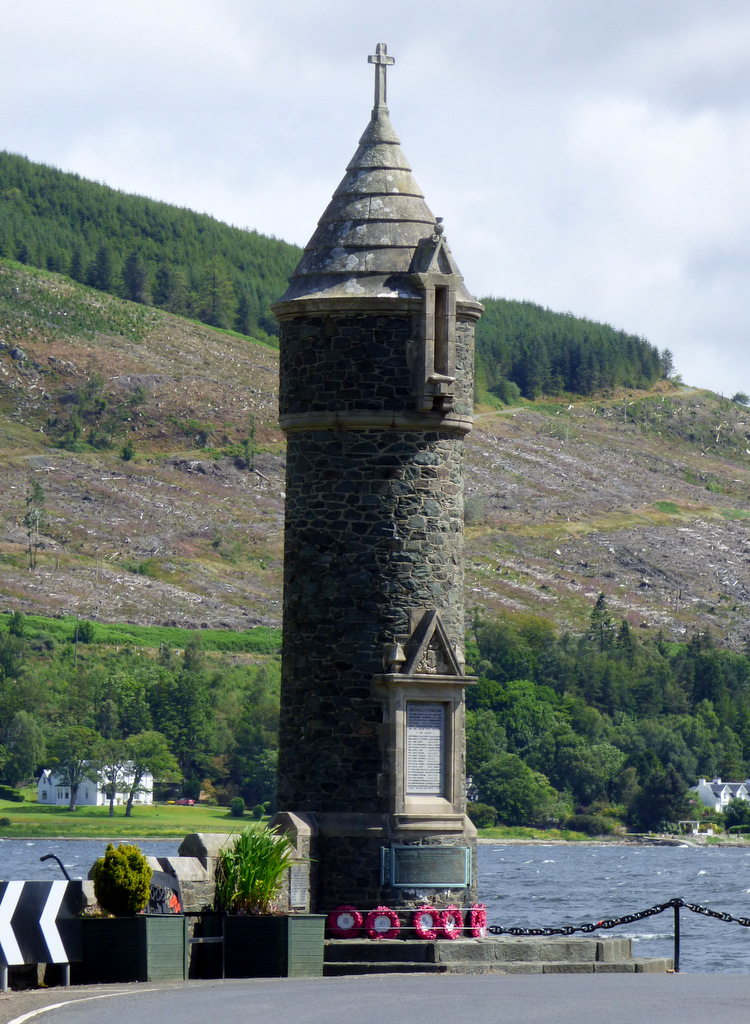
- The memorial in 2019, looking north-east, with the Holy Loch in the background
- For Soldiers who died and served in World War I and World War II
- Unveiled: May 14, 1922 (103 years ago)
- Location: 55.9818274°N 4.93102446°W; Ardnadam, Argyll and Bute, Scotland
- Designed by: Boston, Menzies & Morton

Erected in 1922, the Lazaretto Point War Memorial (known colloquially as the Lazaretto Memorial) is located in the Scottish village of Ardnadam in Argyll and Bute. It stands, at the apex of sharp bend in the A815, around the midpoint of the southern shores of the Holy Loch.

It was designed by Boston, Menzies & Morton, of Greenock, and unveiled on 14 May 1922. It commemorates the local soldiers who died during service in World War I and World War II.

Mrs John Brown, of nearby Sandbank, performed the unveiling. Five of her sons served in the conflicts, one of whom was killed in action. Reverend A. MacDonald M.A., also of Sandbank, officiated at the ceremony.

== Plaque detail ==
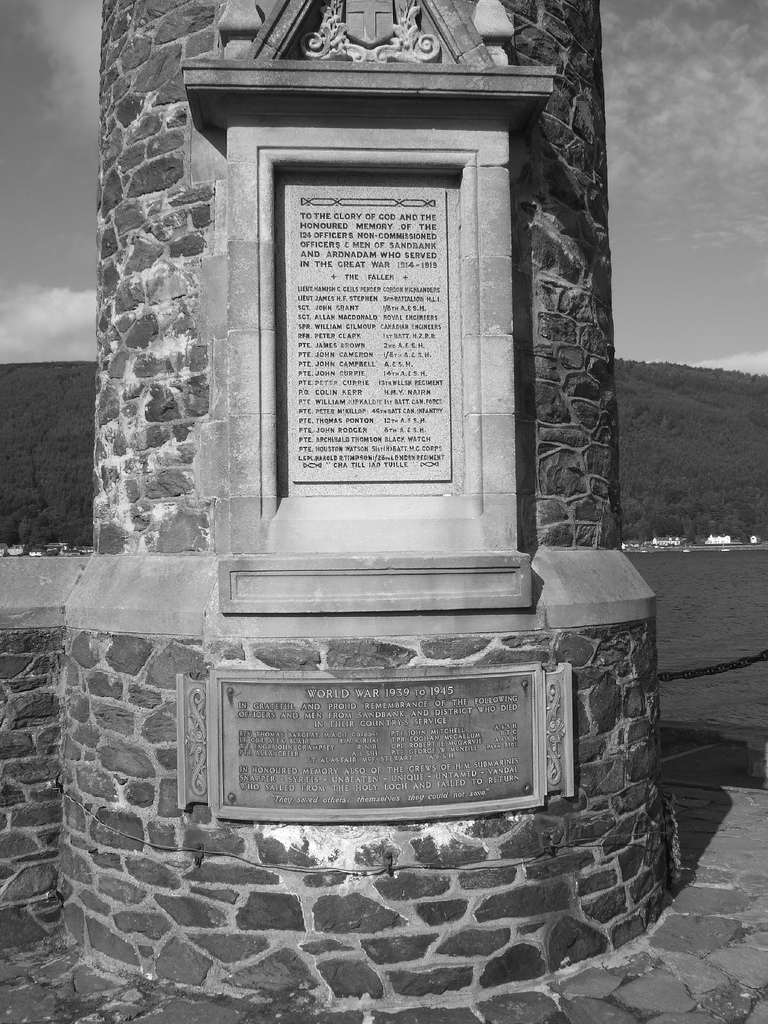
