= Thomas Lennox Watson =

Scottish interior designer

- Watson around 1909
- Born: 21 August 1850; Glasgow, Scotland
- Died: 12 October 1920 (aged 70); Glasgow, Scotland
- Occupation: Architect
- Awards: FRIBA

Thomas Lennox Watson (21 August 1850 – 12 October 1920), FRIBA, was a Scottish architect and interior designer. Born in Glasgow, he submitted designs for the city's City Chambers (1880) and Kelvingrove Art Gallery (1892) competitions, but was unsuccessful.

== Early life ==
Watson was born in Glasgow on 21 August 1850, the son of Charles and Elizabeth. His father was a member of the G. & J. Burns shipping company. The naval architect George Lennox Watson was his cousin.

He was educated at the High School of Glasgow.

== Career ==
At the age of 16, Watson was articled to Boucher & Cousland. He studied at the Glasgow School of Art under Charles Heath Wilson.

Upon the end of his apprenticeship in 1871, he moved to London as an assistant to Alfred Waterhouse. He returned to his hometown in 1874, and formed his own practice at 137 West Regent Street. He moved down the street to number 108 shortly thereafter.

Around 1907, Watson began a partnership with Henry Mitchell.

Professor Alexander McGibbon explained how Watson established patents for hollow walls and monolithic construction in concrete. These were tested in a cottage in Kilbirnie, with walls hardened on the flat which were raised vertically in around ninety minutes.

=== Selected notable works ===
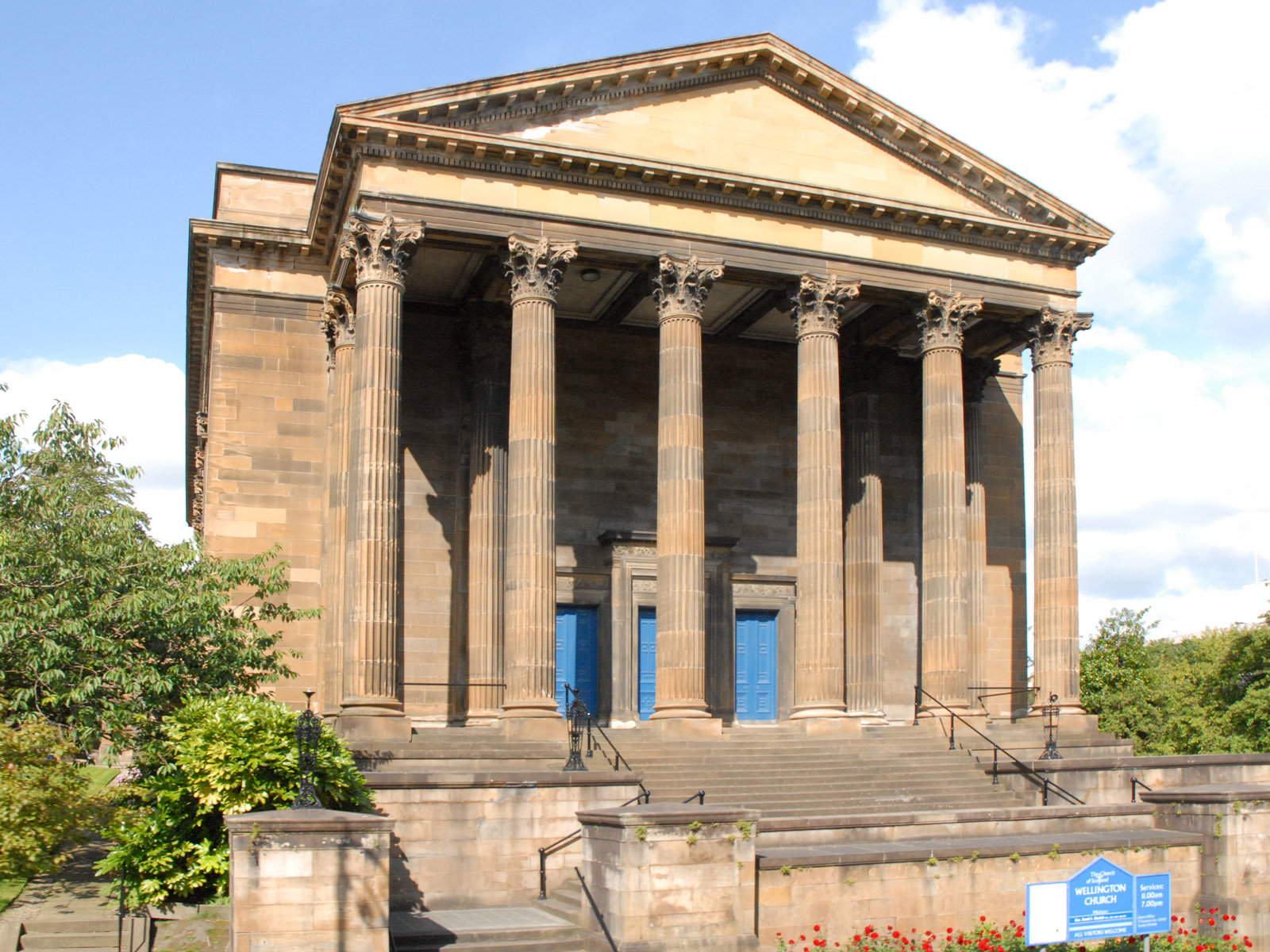
Wellington Church

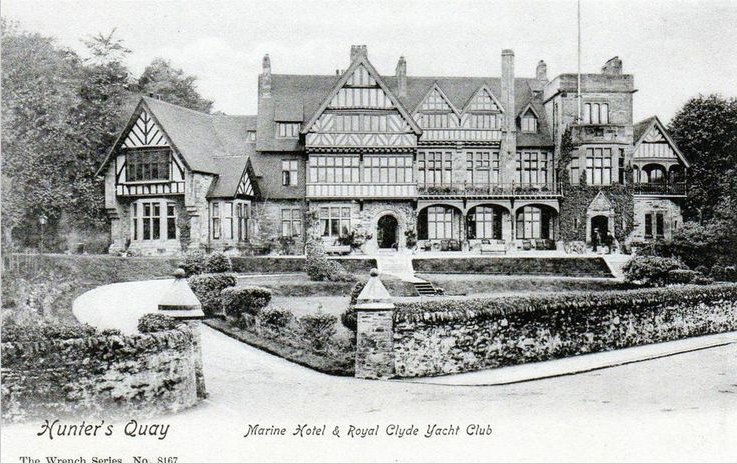
Royal Marine Hotel, Hunters Quay

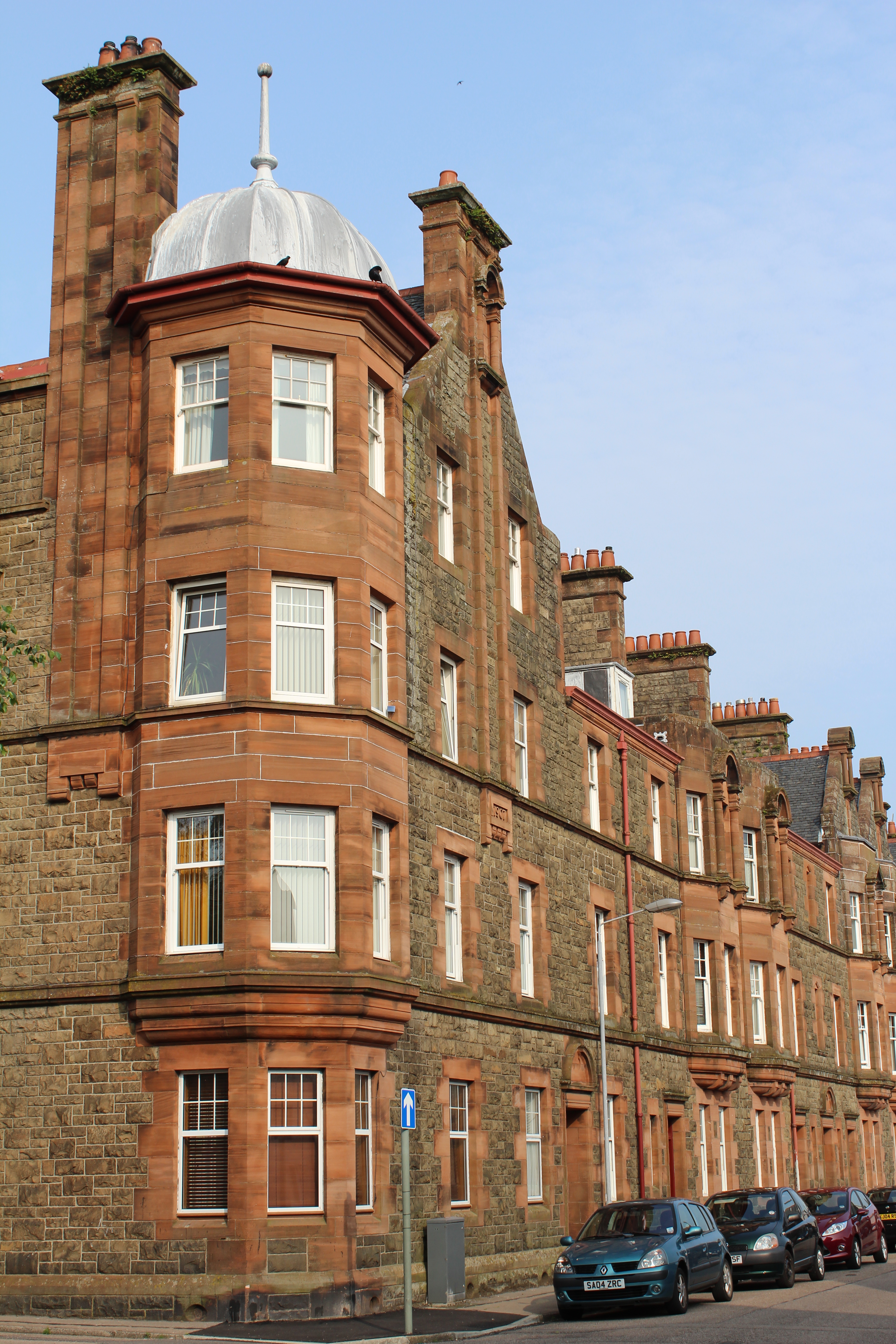
Barochan Place, Argyll Street, Campbeltown

- Adelaide Place Baptist Church, Pitt Street (1875-77)
- Perth North Church, Mill Street (1880)
- Hillhead Baptist Church, Creswell Street (1883)
- Crieff West Parish Church, Perthshire (1883-84)
- Wellington Church, University Avenue (1882-84)
- Royal Marine Hotel, Hunters Quay (1890)
- Woodcroft, Larbert (1890-91)
- The South School, Paisley (1893-95)
- 59 Bath Street (1899–1900, demolished c. 1967)
- Dr James Hederwick Monument, with a bronze portrait by J. P. Macgillivray, Glasgow Cathedral (1901)
- Barochan Place, Argylll Street, Campbeltown (1903-07)
- Saracen Head tenement, Gallowgate (1906)
- 1-21 Long Row South, Campbeltown (1909)
- the interiors for the yachts, Mohican and Meteor, the latter for Kaiser Wilhelm II
- War memorial of the Royal Technical College (1920)

== Personal life ==
Watson become a fellow of the Royal Institute of British Architects in 1884. He became president of the Glasgow Institute of Architects and of the Glasgow Architectural Association. He was also governor of the Glasgow and West of Scotland Technical College.

He retired around 1915, in his mid-60s. He did continue to exhibit, however.

== Death ==
Watson died from cancer on 12 October 1920, at 11 Loudon Terrace, the house in which he was born 70 years earlier.
