= Balgaidh Burn =

River near Dunoon, Scotland

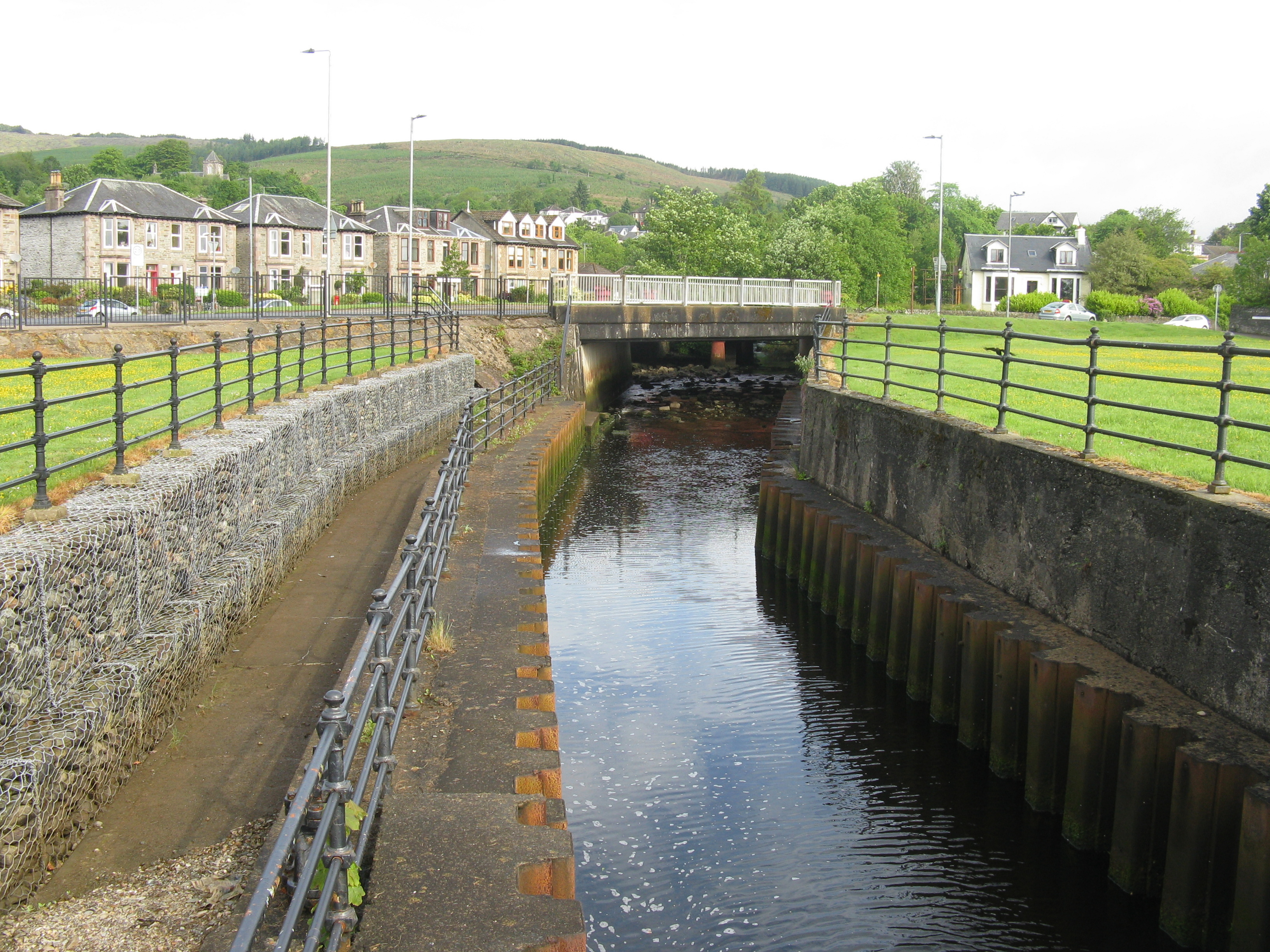
- The burn passing beneath Wellington Street (the A815)

Physical characteristics
- Source
  - location: Dunoon, Argyll and Bute
  - coordinates: 55.940941°N 4.982415°W
- Mouth: Firth of Clyde
  - location: Cowal
  - coordinates: 55.943059°N 4.933615°W
  - elevation: Sea level
- Length: ~2.5 mi
- Discharge
  - location: West Bay, Firth of Clyde, Dunoon, Argyll and Bute

Balgaidh Burn is a watercourse in Argyll and Bute, Scotland. It is the main inflow and outflow of Bishop's Glen Reservoir, which is located a short distance above Dunoon, to the town's southwest. The burn begins a further 1.3 miles (2.1 km) southwest of Bishop's Glen Reservoir, at an elevation of around 1,150 feet (350 m).

On its journey southeast out of the reservoir, the burn flows beneath Kilbride Bridge, the Red Bridge, Wellington Street (A815) and, immediately before its discharge into the Firth of Clyde at Dunoon's West Bay, the Victoria Parade footpath.
