= Bishop's Glen Reservoir =

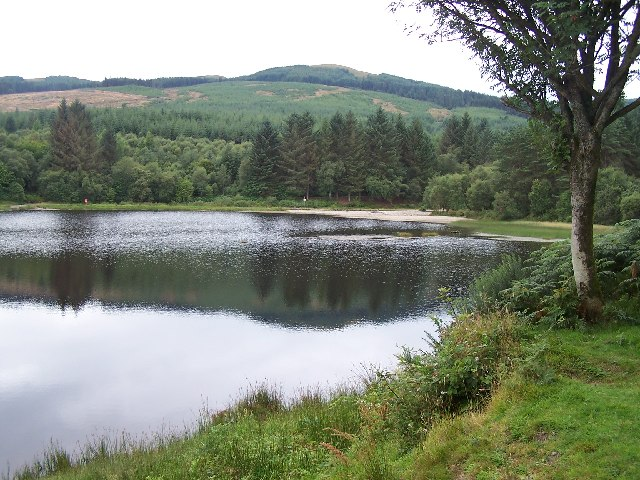

- Location within Argyll and Bute
- Location: Dunoon, Scotland
- Coordinates: 55.9480°N 4.9487°W grid reference NS16087669
- Type: Reservoir
- Primary inflows: Balgaidh Burn
- Primary outflows: Balgaidh Burn
- Catchment area: Cowal
- Basin countries: Scotland, United Kingdom
- Surface area: 190,000 m^{2} (2,000,000 sq ft)
- Water volume: 252,000 m^{3} (204 acre⋅ft)
- Surface elevation: 78 m (256 ft)
- Islands: 0

Bishop's Glen Reservoir, also known as Dunoon Reservoir, used to be the source for drinking water for the town of Dunoon, Argyll and Bute, Scotland, a function now satisfied via Loch Eck. Records show that this impounding reservoir was created before 1880. The Balgaidh Burn is the main inflow and outflow.

The angling of the Bishop's Glen Reservoir is managed by the Dunoon and District Angling Club.

== See also ==
- List of reservoirs and dams in the United Kingdom

== Sources ==
- "Argyll and Bute Council Reservoirs Act 1975 Public Register"
