= McColl's Hotel =

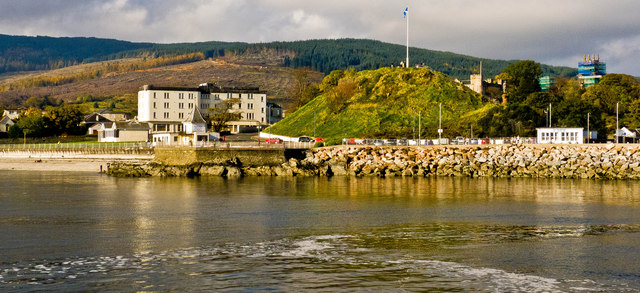
- The hotel (left) viewed from the Firth of Clyde in 2012

- Location within Scotland McColl's Hotel (Argyll and Bute)

General information
- Location: Tom-a-Mhoid Road, Dunoon, Argyll and Bute, Scotland
- Coordinates: 55.945683°N 4.925759°W
- Opening: 1883
- Closed: 2015

Technical details
- Floor count: 4

Other information
- Number of rooms: 60

McColl's Hotel was a hotel in Dunoon, Cowal, Argyll and Bute, Scotland. It stood, on Tom-a-Mhoid Road (the A815) in the town's West Bay, adjacent to Castle Hill and the steamboat pier, between 1883 and 2015. During its first century in operation, it was recognised as a desirable destination for tourists visiting the town, especially by steamboat. In 1910, it was listed in the World's Hotel Blue Book and Who's Who in the Hotel World, along with Dunoon's Argyll Hotel, Crown Hotel and Royal Hotel. While the Argyll was described as Dunoon's largest hotel, McColl's was noted as being its most select due to having its own grounds.

The building, formerly Lismore Lodge (residence of Humphrey Crum-Ewing, Lord-Lieutenant of Dunbartonshire), was purchased by a Mr McColl, who had previously been the lessee of the Argyll Hotel.

The 60-room hotel, which had four storeys, had an 18-hole putting green on its lawn. An addition in 1891 included dining and billiard rooms and lawn tennis.

Its proprietor in the early 20th century was Hugh McKinnon, while in 1928 it was William Wallace.

The Scottish Trades Union Congress held its meeting at the hotel in November 1956.

The hotel was demolished in 2015.
