= Cowal RFC =

Scottish rugby union team

- Full name: Cowal Rugby Football Club
- Union: Scottish Rugby Union
- Founded: 1976 (49 years ago)
- Location: Dunoon, Scotland
- Ground(s): Dunoon Stadium
- League(s): West Division Three
- 2019–10: West Non-League, promoted
Team kit

Cowal RFC is a rugby union side based in Dunoon, Scotland. The club was founded in 1976. They play their home games at Dunoon Stadium.

== History ==
The club runs a men's XV, a women's XV and junior sections.

It runs a rugby festival to introduce the local primary schools to rugby.

The Cowal Junior side played its first competitive match at Scotstoun Stadium on 8 March 2019. They played against Moffat RFC in a half time match during the Women's Six Nations Championship Scotland v Wales match.

The local Rugby Development Officer works with the four main schools in Cowal RFC's catchment area and this has helped boost the junior numbers coming to the club.
