= Ardnadam =

Coordinates: 55.9779°N 4.9345°W

Ardnadam: Scottish Gaelic: Àird nan Damh
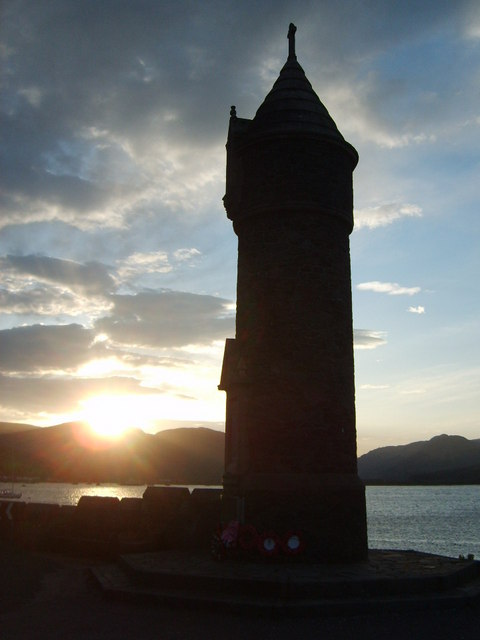
- Sunset from Lazaretto Point

- Location within Argyll and Bute
- OS grid reference: NS17008000
- Council area: Argyll and Bute
- Lieutenancy area: Argyll and Bute
- Country: Scotland
- Sovereign state: United Kingdom
- Post town: DUNOON, ARGYLL
- Postcode district: PA23
- Dialling code: 01369
- UK Parliament: Argyll, Bute and South Lochaber
- Scottish Parliament: Argyll and Bute

Ardnadam (Scottish Gaelic: Àird nan Damh) is a village on the Holy Loch on the Cowal Peninsula, in Argyll and Bute, west of Scotland. It is located northwest of Hunters Quay and east of Sandbank, and sits across the loch from Kilmun.

== History ==
"Ardnadam village is of very recent date," wrote John Colegate in 1868. "Only a few years ago, an excellent pier and hotel were built. Since then, many feus have been taken, and neat cottages erected thereon." The first proprietor of The Ardnadam, the village's early hotel, was Mr Jamieson. He was also the pier master.

== Lazaretto Point War Memorial ==
The memorial is situated on the Holy Loch shore next to the A815 road. It commemorates the fallen of the First and Second World Wars.

== Trails ==
=== Ardnadam Heritage Trail ===
Ardnadam Heritage Trail is 2.75 miles (4.43 km) long and climbs to Dunan Hill (Camel's Hump), which has views across Loch Loskin, Dunoon, Holy Loch and the Firth of Clyde.

Other walking trails go beside Loch Loskin, and to the site of an ancient cromlech on the nearby Ardnadam Farm.

== Lazaretto Point Quarantine Station ==
Lazaretto Point in Ardnadam was the site of a quarantine station, built in 1807, to treat disease brought into the Clyde ports with imported cotton shipments. The station was demolished in 1840.

== Gallery ==
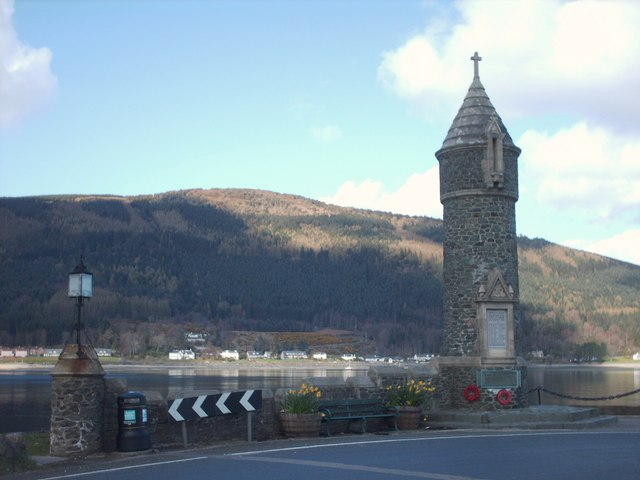
Lazaretto Memorial

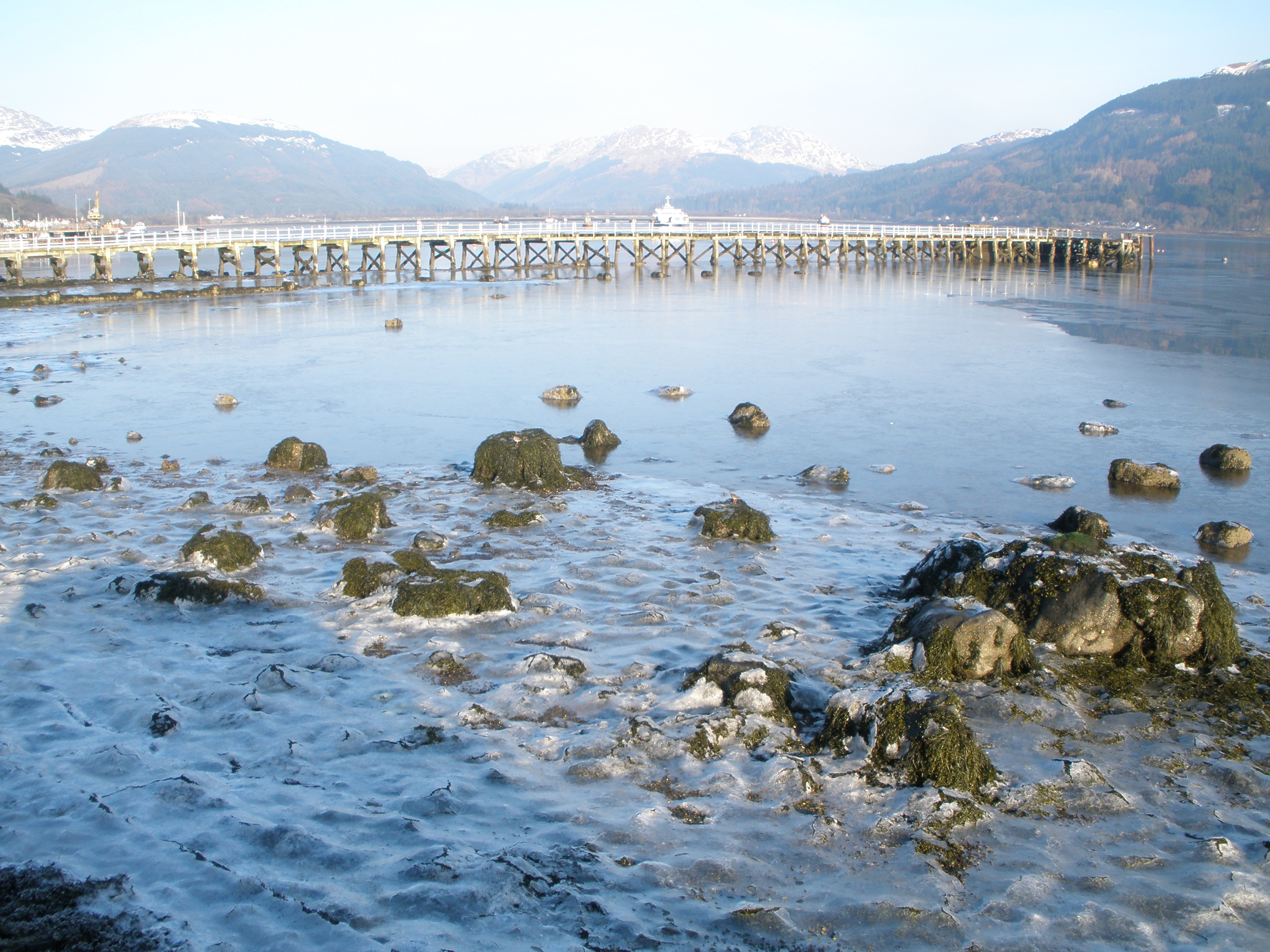
Ardnadam Pier and the Holy Loch

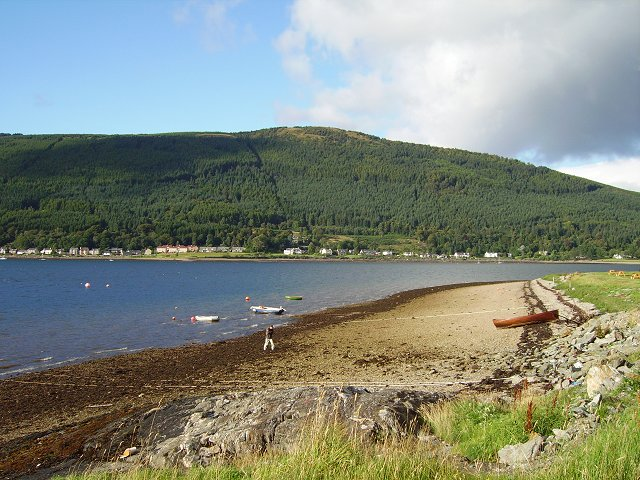
Ardnadam Bay
