= Laudervale =

Coordinates: 55.935°N 4.937°W

Early 20th century postcard of Laudervale

Laudervale was a Victorian sandstone mansion near Dunoon, Scotland, most notable for being the home of Sir Harry Lauder.

The house was located on Bullwood Road, a few hundred metres south of Bullwood. Built as Gerhallow House, it was bought by Harry Lauder and his wife from Douglas Granville Gossling on 20 May 1908. The couple disliked the existing name and by 1912 had renamed it to the more personalised Laudervale, carrying out in the intervening years a full restoration, including laying "beautiful mahogany parquet floors", the wood being a present after a tour of the Philippines. Lauder used the property as his principal residence from 1908 into the 1930s.

After its sale, many years later, the subsequent owner fell asleep smoking, setting the house on fire, which burnt over half of it. It remained in a ruinous state until the 1980s when the house, the stable blocks, and the stone walls surrounding the park, were demolished. Most of the grounds were subsequently sold for housing development. The development there today preserves the Laudervale name.
