= Kilbride Bridge =

Bridge in Argyll and Bute, Scotland

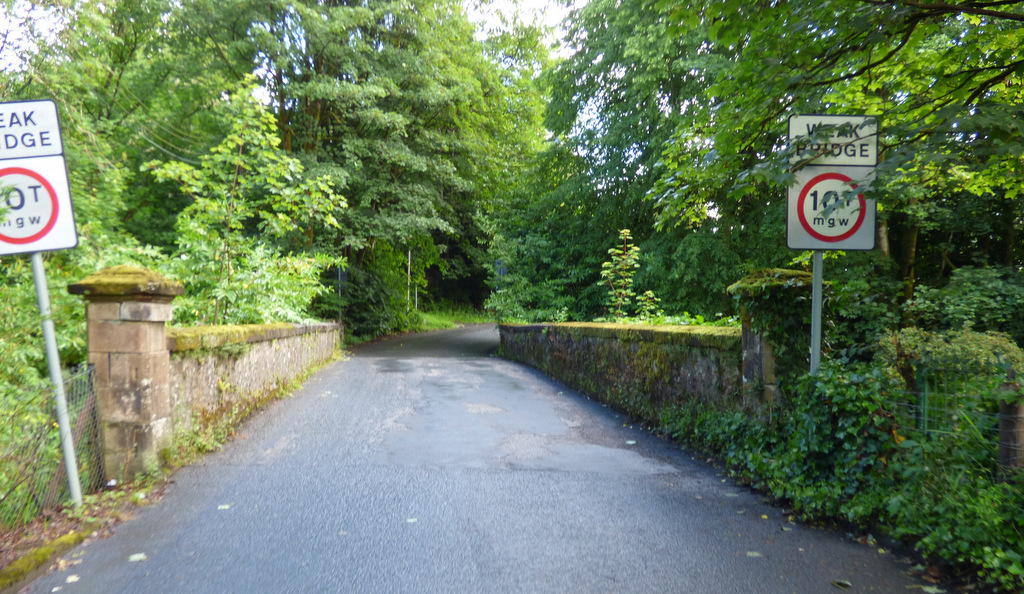
- The bridge in 2019
- Coordinates: 55.947012°N 4.938932°W
- OS grid reference: NS 16579 76565
- Carries: Kilbride Road
- Crosses: Balgaidh Burn
- Locale: Argyll and Bute

Characteristics
- Design: Arch
- Material: Stone

History
- Built: Early 19th century

Listed Building – Category C(S)
- Official name: Kilbride Bridge, Over Balgie Burn
- Designated: 27 August 1980
- Reference no.: LB26447

Location
- Interactive map of Kilbride Bridge

Kilbride Bridge is a bridge in Dunoon, Argyll and Bute, Scotland. A Category C listed structure, it carries the traffic of Kilbride Road. It is made of red sandstone rubble, and has a segmental arch span. The bridge is toll-free.

== Gallery ==
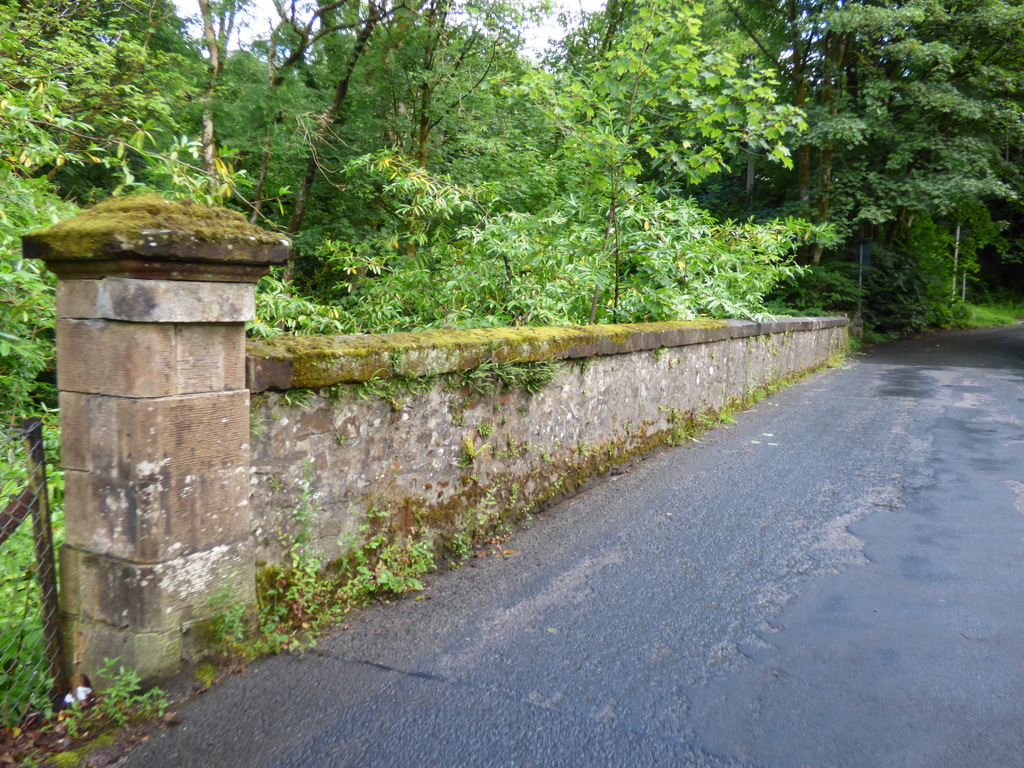
The parapet on the upstream (western) side of the bridge, pictured in 2019

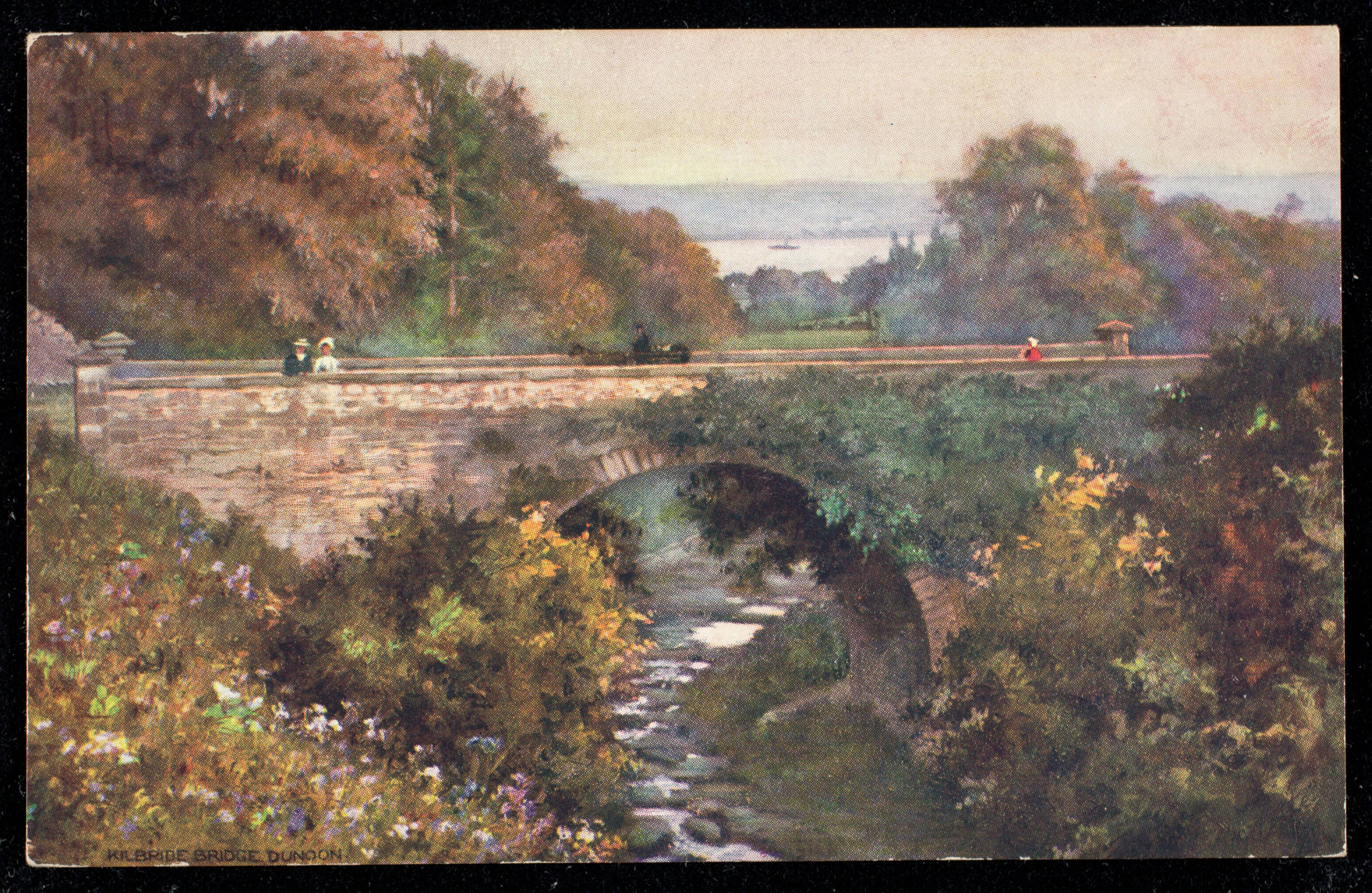
An early-20th-century painting of the bridge, looking east (downstream) to the Firth of Clyde

== See also ==
- List of bridges in Scotland
