= Dunoon Stadium =

Stadium in Dunoon, Scotland

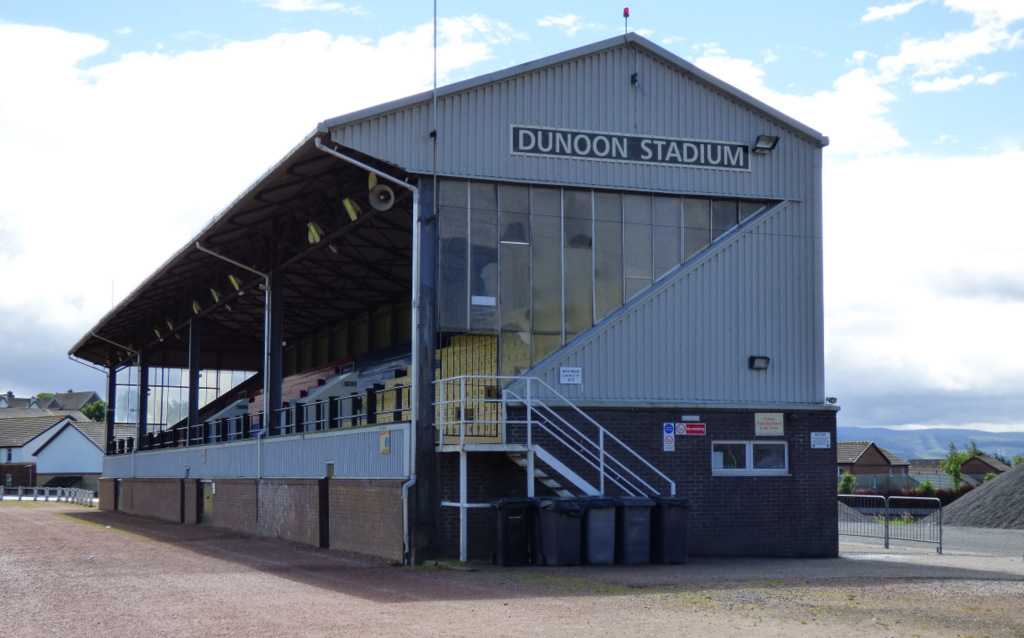
- Dunoon Stadium's grandstand

- Location in Scotland
- Location: Argyll Street; Dunoon; Scotland
- Coordinates: 55.958960°N 4.924834°W
- Surface: Grass

Tenants
- Dunoon Amateurs F.C. Cowal RFC; Dunoon Camanachd

Dunoon Stadium is a single-tier grandstand and natural environ in Dunoon, Scotland. A cinder track surrounds a central grassed area, overlooked from the south by the grandstand. Today, the stadium is the focal point of the Cowal Highland Gathering.

== Location ==
Located to the north of Dunoon's town centre, adjacent to Cowal Community Hospital, it is accessed from Argyll Street and is bounded by Dixon Avenue to the north and Park Road to the east. Black Park is to its immediate south.

== History ==
Dunoon Amateurs F.C., founded in 1975, played its home games at the ground and at nearby Dunoon Grammar School.

When it hosted football matches, the stadium had the largest capacity (50,000) of any junior ground in Scotland, due to the bowl-shape of the terrain forming its boundary providing natural viewing positions for spectators. It later became the focal point of the Cowal Highland Gathering. Motorcycle dirt track racing (or speedway) was staged at the stadium on 18 June 1932 as part of the annual Dunoon and Cowal Agricultural Show. A demonstration event had been staged in May 1932.

Today, the stadium is home to Dunoon Amateurs F.C., Cowal RFC and Dunoon Camanachd.

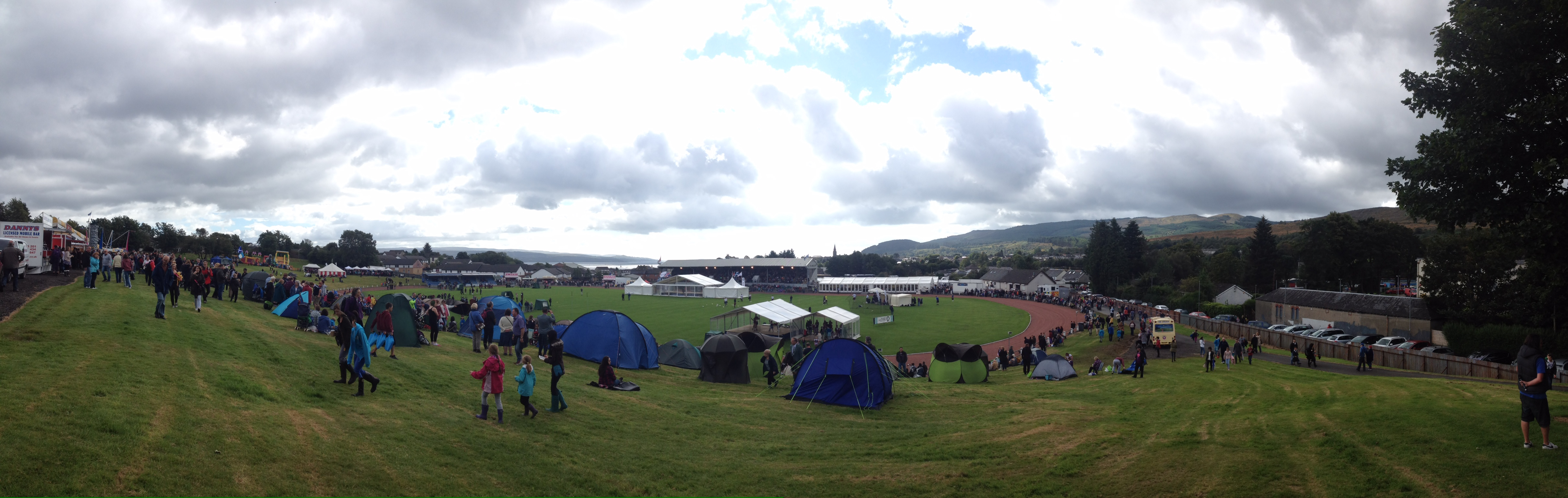
Panoramic view of Dunoon Stadium during the Cowal Highland Gathering, looking south to the town centre

=== Notable events ===
In October 2022, the stadium hosted shinty's South Division One championship game between ColGlen and Ballachulish.

The stadium serves as the headquarters and service station for the Argyll Rally.
