= Perth North Church =

North Church
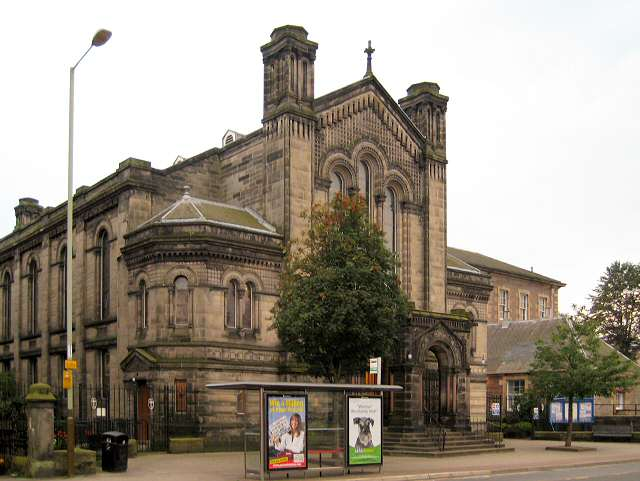
- The church's Mill Street elevation in 2008
- North Church
- 56°23′50″N 3°26′00″W
- Location: Mill Street and High Street, Perth, Perth and Kinross
- Country: Scotland
- Denomination: Church of Scotland
- Website: Official website

History
- Status: open

Architecture
- Functional status: used
- Heritage designation: Category B listed building
- Designated: 26 August 1977
- Architect: Thomas Lennox Watson
- Completed: 1880 (146 years ago)

North Church is located in Perth, Perth and Kinross, Scotland. Of Church of Scotland denomination, it is located on Mill Street, but its official address is 209 High Street (where its entrance is located behind the façades of the High Street properties). Completed in 1880, originally as a United Presbyterian Church, it is now a Category B listed building. The church's architect was Thomas Lennox Watson.

In 1985, the church joined with the now-defunct St Leonard's Parish Church, on Perth's King Street.

== See also ==
- List of listed buildings in Perth, Scotland
