= Cowal Community Hospital =

- NHS Highland
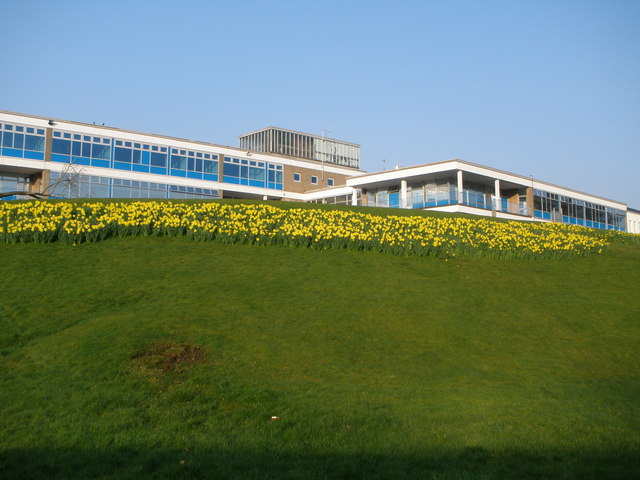

- Shown in Argyll and Bute

Geography
- Location: Argyll Street, Dunoon, Argyll and Bute, Scotland, United Kingdom
- Coordinates: 55.959257°N 4.9277880°W

Organisation
- Care system: NHS Scotland
- Type: Community Hospital

Services
- Emergency department: Yes Accident & Emergency
- Beds: 14

History
- Founded: 1885

Links
- Website: Cowal Community Hospital
- Lists: Hospitals in Scotland

Cowal Community Hospital is a community hospital in Dunoon, Argyll and Bute, Scotland. It is managed by NHS Highland.

The hospital is situated at the upper end of Argyll Street, a part of the A885 road, near where it become Sandbank Road.

== History ==
The hospital has its origins in the Dunoon Cottage Hospital on the corner of Alfred Street and King Street which opened in 1885. This was replaced by a new cottage hospital which was opened by Princess Louise in October 1908. A modern purpose-built facility was opened by the Duchess of Gloucester as the Dunoon and District General Hospital in November 1966. At the time it had 74 beds, mainly configured in four-bed wards. It changed its name to Cowal Community Hospital in c.2008.

== Services ==
The hospital has a GP-led accident and emergency department, a maternity unit, dental surgery suite and a general ward and there are also numerous consultant led clinics available at the hospital. It provides services for the Cowal peninsula population, numbering some fifteen thousand people. It has fourteen beds.
