= Queen's Hall, Dunoon =

Building in Dunoon, Scotland

Queen's Hall
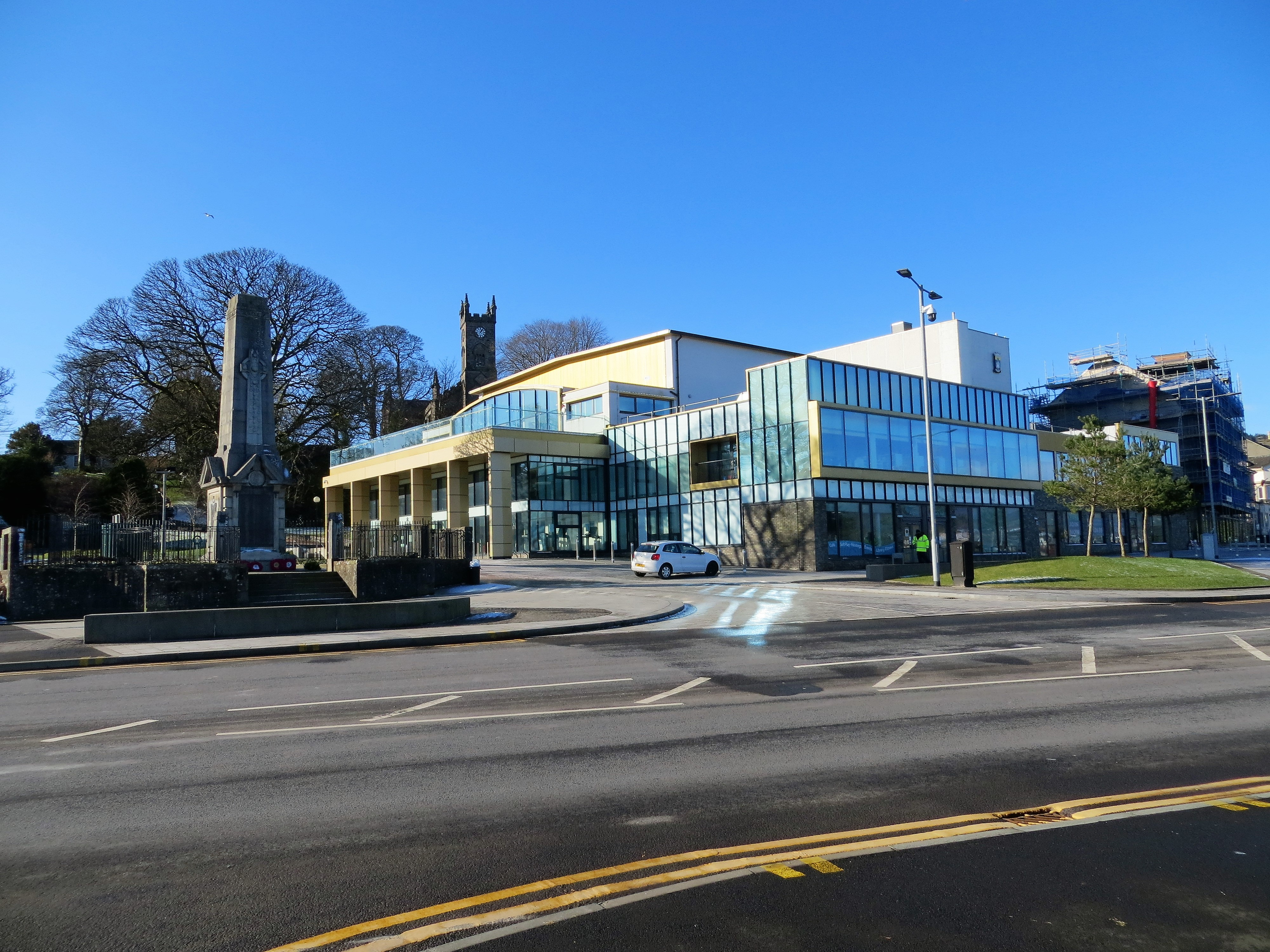
- Pictured in 2021

- Shown in Argyll and Bute Queen's Hall, Dunoon (Scotland)
- 55.947526°N 4.923929°W
- Location: 9 Argyll Street, Dunoon, Scotland

History
- Built: 1958 (68 years ago)

Site notes
- Architect: Malcolm Fraser Architects
- Website: Queen's Hall

Queen's Hall is a building in Dunoon, Argyll and Bute, Scotland. Standing at 9 Argyll Street, adjacent to Castle Hill, it has been the town's multi-function building since 1958. It was formerly known as the New Pavilion, having replaced the 1905 Dunoon Public Pavilion.

The building was officially opened by Queen Elizabeth II on 11 August 1958. It contains three meeting rooms, an activity room and the Olympian Suite, in addition to its large main hall. The main hall has a stage with professional sound and lighting equipment, and has attracted popular acts such as Pink Floyd, Blur, the Saw Doctors, David Gray, Morrissey, the Red Hot Chilli Pipers, Primal Scream and comedians Kevin Bridges, Bill Bailey and Roy Chubby Brown. In late 2015, the building was closed to enable a major refurbishment, to a design by Malcolm Fraser Architects, but this did not begin until January 2017. Queen's Hall reopened in August 2018.

Dunoon Library has shared part of the building's first floor since being moved from Castle House Museum in 2018. In 2025, the collection was downsized and moved to another part of the building.

== Predecessor ==
The southern façade of Dunoon Public Pavilion, designed by William Fraser and opened by Princess Louise, Duchess of Argyll, in 1905

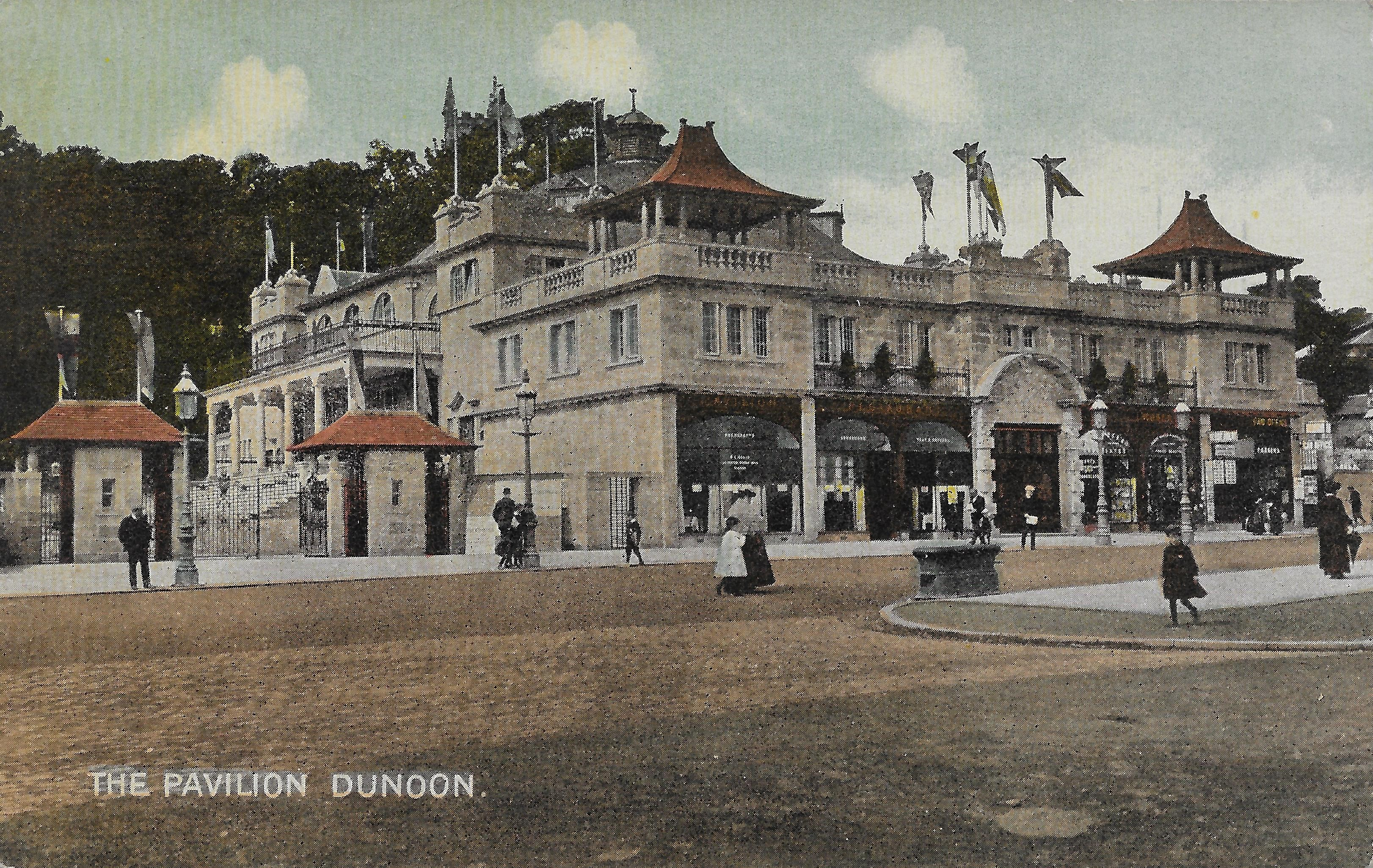
Eastern elevation, fronting Argyll Street
