= A815 road =

Road on the Cowal peninsula in Scotland

Coordinates: 56.08260025°N 4.98879410°W

A815

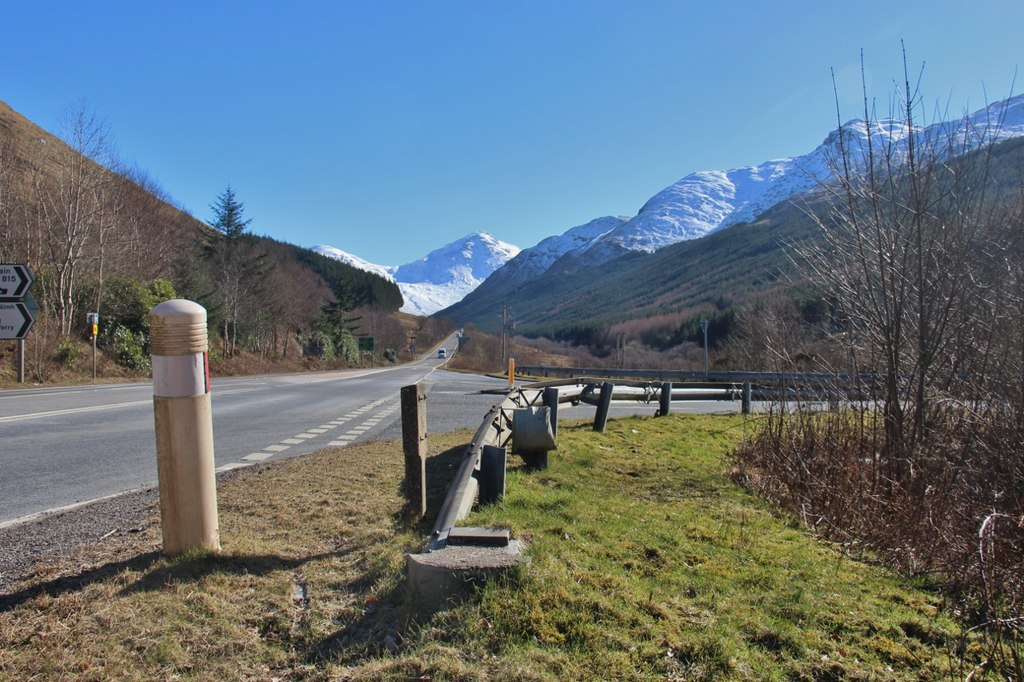
- The junction of the A815 (right) with the A83

Route information
- Length: 35.7 mi (57.5 km)

Major junctions
- North end: A83
- A886; A880; A885 (High Road); A885 (John Street)
- South end: Emergence from an unnamed road in Toward

Location
- Country: United Kingdom

Road network
- Roads in the United Kingdom; Motorways; A and B road zones

A885

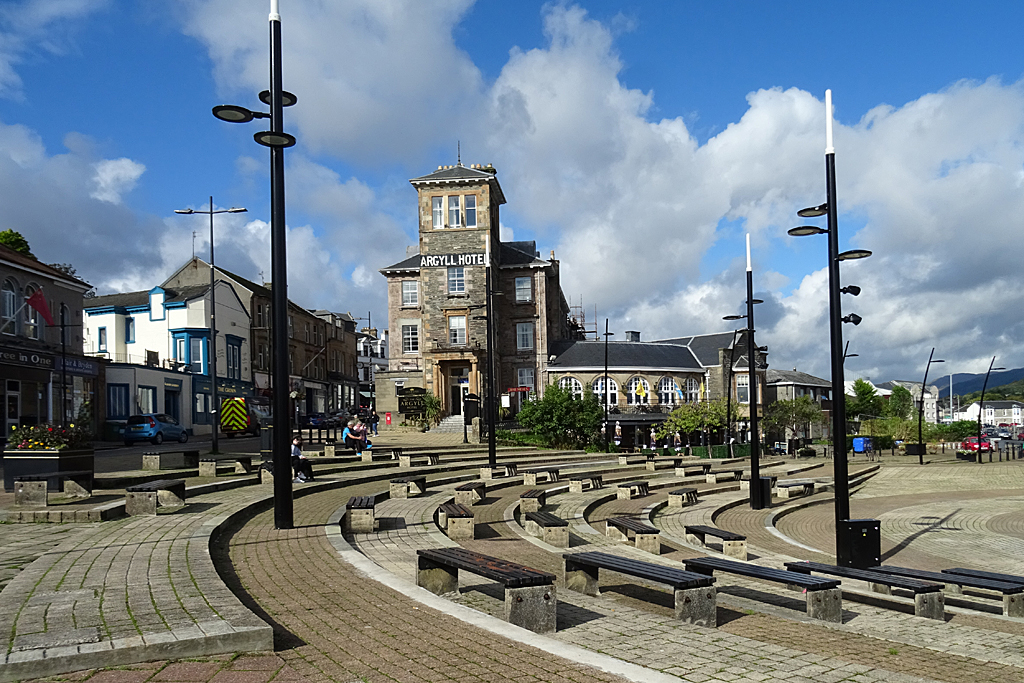
- The Argyll Hotel, where the A885 (left) rejoins the A815 (right)

Route information
- Length: 2.6 mi (4.2 km)

Major junctions
- North end: A815 (High Road)

- South end: A815 (John Street)

Location
- Country: United Kingdom

Road network
- Roads in the United Kingdom; Motorways; A and B road zones

The A815 is a major road in Argyll and Bute, Scotland. It runs for about 35.7 miles (57.5 km) from the A83, near Cairndow, in the north, through Dunoon, to Toward in the south. For a short distance, from Sandbank and through Dunoon, the A815 is paralleled by the A885, which takes a more inland route compared to the A815.

The A815 passes beside two sea lochs, Loch Fyne and the Holy Loch, and one substantial freshwater loch, Loch Eck, whilst its final stretch is along the Firth of Clyde.

== Route ==
=== A83 junction to Sandbank ===
The road begins at a T-junction with the A83, about 0.7 miles (1.1 km) east of Ardkinglas Woodland Garden. The road immediately crosses the Kinglas Water and turns west and then south-west, running close to the eastern shores of Loch Fyne. Just before reaching Strachur, at the junction with the A886, the road turns south-east, heading inland past Strachur village.

After Strachur, the road follows the River Cur and passes Glenbranter and the Lauder Monument. It the runs south down the full length of the eastern shore of Loch Eck, a 7-mile (11 km) long freshwater loch. About a third of the way down the loch, an unclassified road climbs out to reach the head of Glen Finart, which it follows to Ardentinny on Loch Long. To the south of the loch, the A815 passes Benmore Botanic Garden and the entrance to Puck's Glen.

After a few sweeping curves, the A880 branches off to run along the north shore of the Holy Loch to Blairmore, where a second unclassified road connects to Ardentinny. Beyond this junction, the A815 bridges both the Eachaig River and the Little Eachaig River, before continuing beside the northern end of the Holy Loch. Here it meets the B836, which climbs Glen Lean towards Loch Striven and the A886 in Glendaruel. After this junction, the A815 continues along the south shore of the Holy Lock to Sandbank village.

=== Sandbank to Dunoon via A815 ===
In Sandbank, at a T-junction with the A885 High Road (see below), the road turns left towards the Holy Loch Marina as Rankin's Brae. At the mouth of the Holy Loch, at the western shores of the Firth of Clyde, the road turns south as it leads through Hunters Quay and enters the town of Dunoon. As Marine Parade, the road continues through Hunters Quay and Kirn, not long after which the road becomes Alexandra Parade.

En route to Dunoon's East Bay, the road passes several roads that lead up and down the hill perpendicular to the Firth of Clyde, including Clyde Street and Dhalling Road. Several others, not mentioned here, are cul-de-sacs. Still as Alexandra Parade, the road crosses a roundabout shared with John Street, then passes Church Street, Moir Street and the southern end of Argyll Street. The A885 rejoins tha A815 along John Street and Argyll Street (see below).

=== Sandbank to Dunoon via A885 ===
The A885 diverges from the A815 at a T-junction in Sandbank. The A885, here known as the High Road, heads south on a higher and more direct route towards Dunoon as compared to the coast route adopted by the A815. On its route it passes through woodland and by the shore of Loch Loskin, where it takes the name Sandbank Road. Shortly thereafter the road enters the town of Dunoon, passing by the Cowal Community Hospital.

The A885 then becomes Argyll Street, Dunoon's principal shopping street. At a junction with John Street, the A885 designation forks, with one fork passing down John Street to rejoin the A815 at a roundabout, whilst the other fork continues along Argyll Street to rejoin the A815 by the Argyll Hotel. Traffic on the latter fork is restricted to passing northbound only.

=== Dunoon to Toward ===
The road continues past Dunoon Pier and, as Pier Esplanade, crosses the roundabout overlooked by the Highland Mary statue. As Tom-a-Mhoid Road (briefly), then Auchamore Road, the road then sweeps a few hundred feet inland, on a pronounced curve to the east, forming junctions with Park Avenue, Kirk Street, Castle Street, Jane Street, Hillfoot Street, Victoria Road, Auchamore Road. The curve ends at Wellington Street, then continues past (another) Clyde Street, William Street and Victoria Parade.

At West Bay, after passing the western end of Victoria Parade near its crossing of Balgaidh Burn, the road turns south again as Bullwood Road. After leaving Dunoon, the road continues for a further 5 miles (8.0 km) south along the west bank of the firth, passing through Bullwood, Ardhallow and Innellan, where it becomes another Shore Road.

Finally the road reaches Toward, which marks the junction of the Kyles of Bute and the Firth, and turns west at its junction with an unnamed road which leads south to the centre of Toward, and soon ends around 1,700 feet (520 m) west of Toward Church.

== Name ==
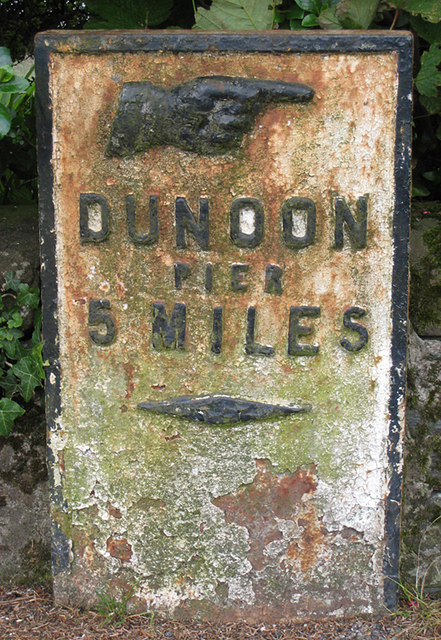
A milestone on the road between Toward and Innellan

The A815 has several names over its course (from north to south):

- Woodbank (Sandbank)
- Rankin's Brae (Sandbank)
- Shore Road (Sandbank to Kirn)
- Marine Parade (Hunters Quay to Kirn)
- Alexandra Parade (Kirn to Dunoon)
- Pier Esplanade (from Dunoon Pier to Victoria Parade)
- Tom-A-Mhoid Road
- Auchamore Road
- Wellington Street
- Bullwood Road
- Shore Road (between Innellan and Toward)

The A885 has the following names:

- High Road
- Sandbank Road
- Argyll Street
- John Street

== Notable building and structures ==
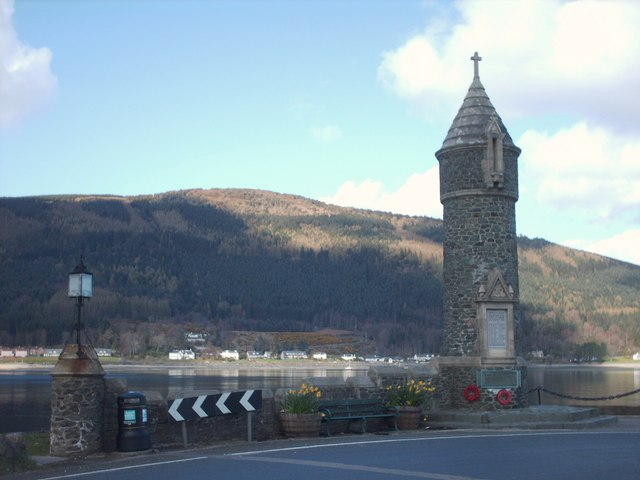
Lazaretto Point

The following buildings, structures or sites of interest stand (or formerly stood) beside the A815 road (from north to south):

- Coylet Inn, a 17th-century coaching inn
- Whistlefield Inn
- Benmore Botanic Garden
- Lazaretto Point War Memorial
- Hafton House, Hunters Quay
- Royal Marine Hotel, Hunters Quay
- Hunters Quay Hotel, Hunters Quay
- Queen's Hotel, Kirn
- Kirn & Sandbank Parish Church, Dunoon
- Dunoon Pier, Dunoon
- Highland Mary statue, Dunoon
- McColl's Hotel (1883–2015; now demolished)
- Laudervale, Dunoon (the now-demolished former home of Sir Harry Lauder)

Additionally, the following are alongside the A885:

- Cowal Community Hospital
- Dunoon Stadium
- Burgh Hall
- Argyll Hotel
- Queen's Hall

== Viewpoints ==
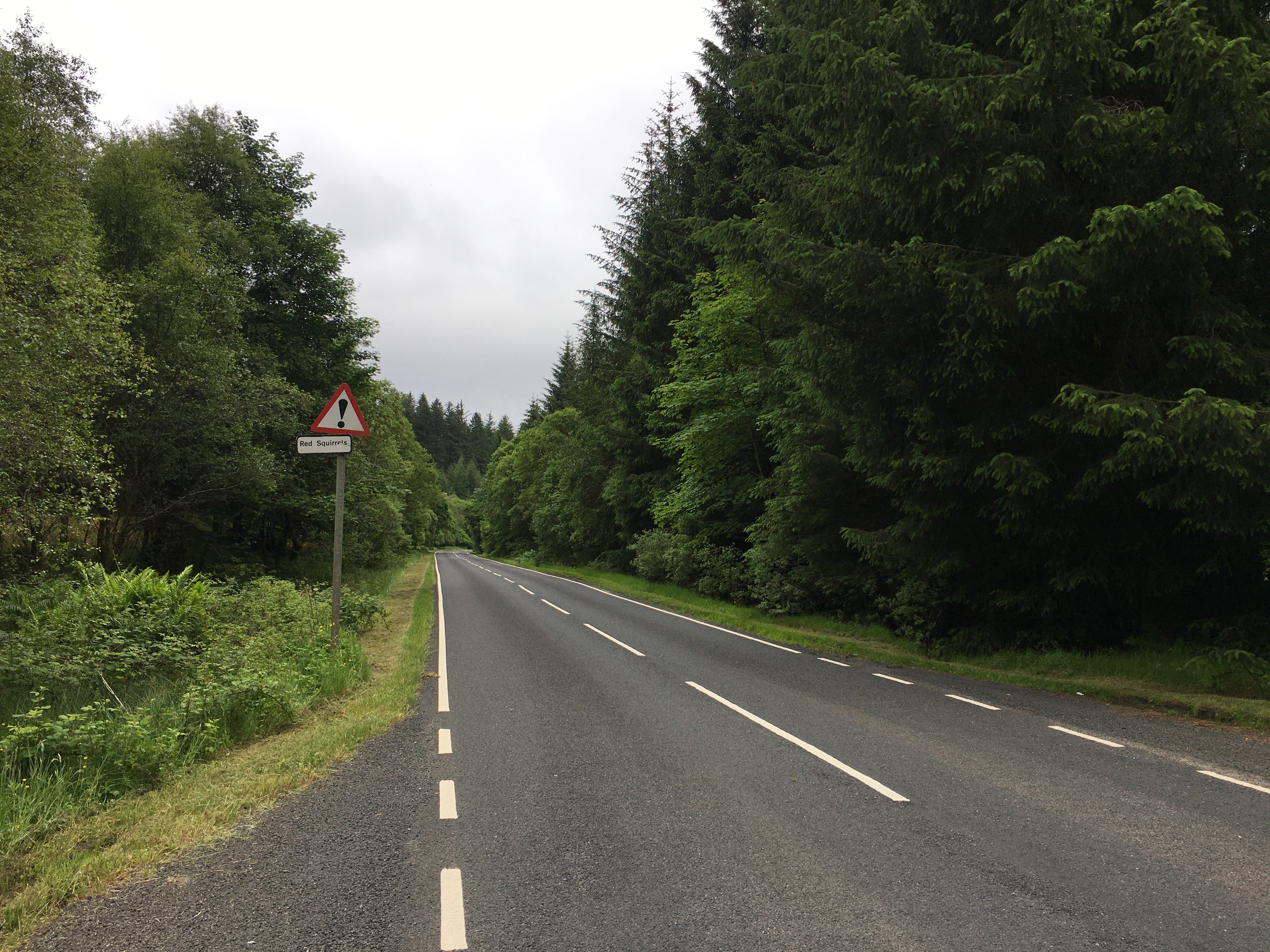
Between Strachur and Dunoon

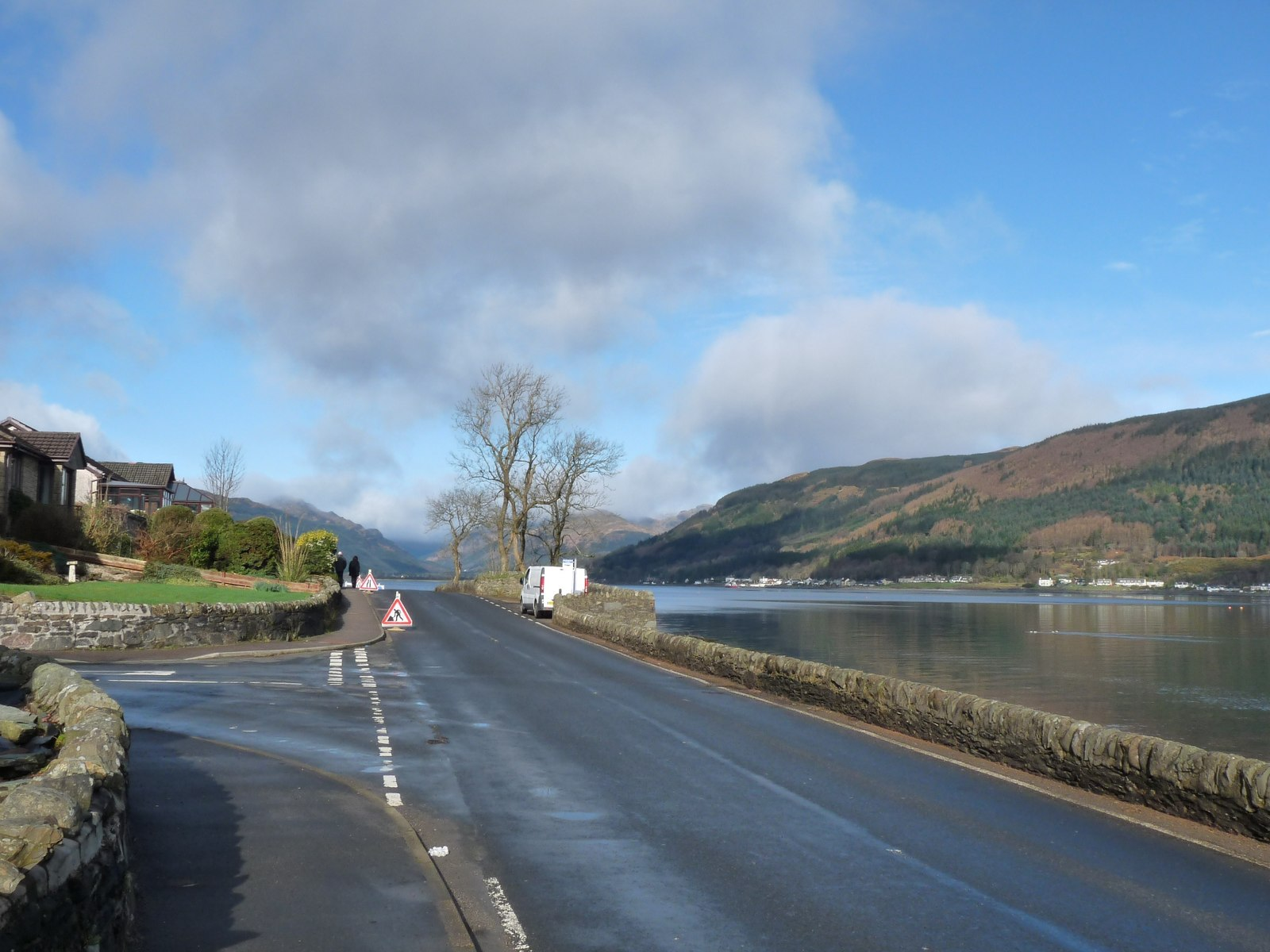
Beside the Holy Loch, looking northwest

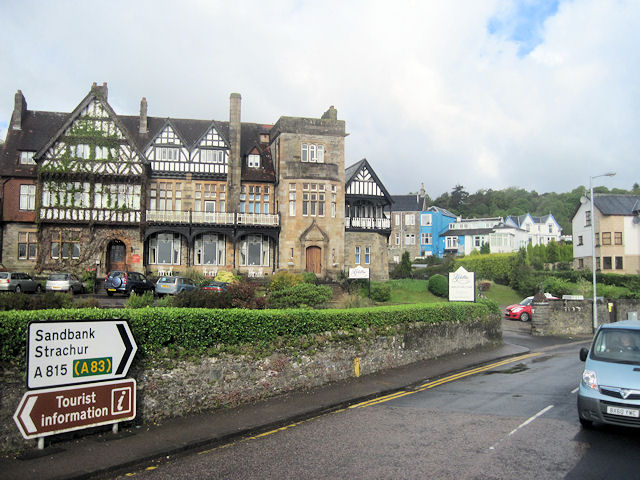
The road passing in front of the Royal Marine Hotel in Hunters Quay

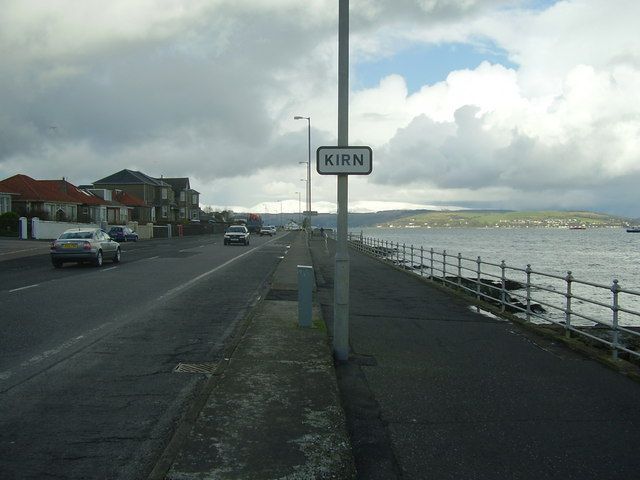
Alexandra Parade in Kirn, looking north

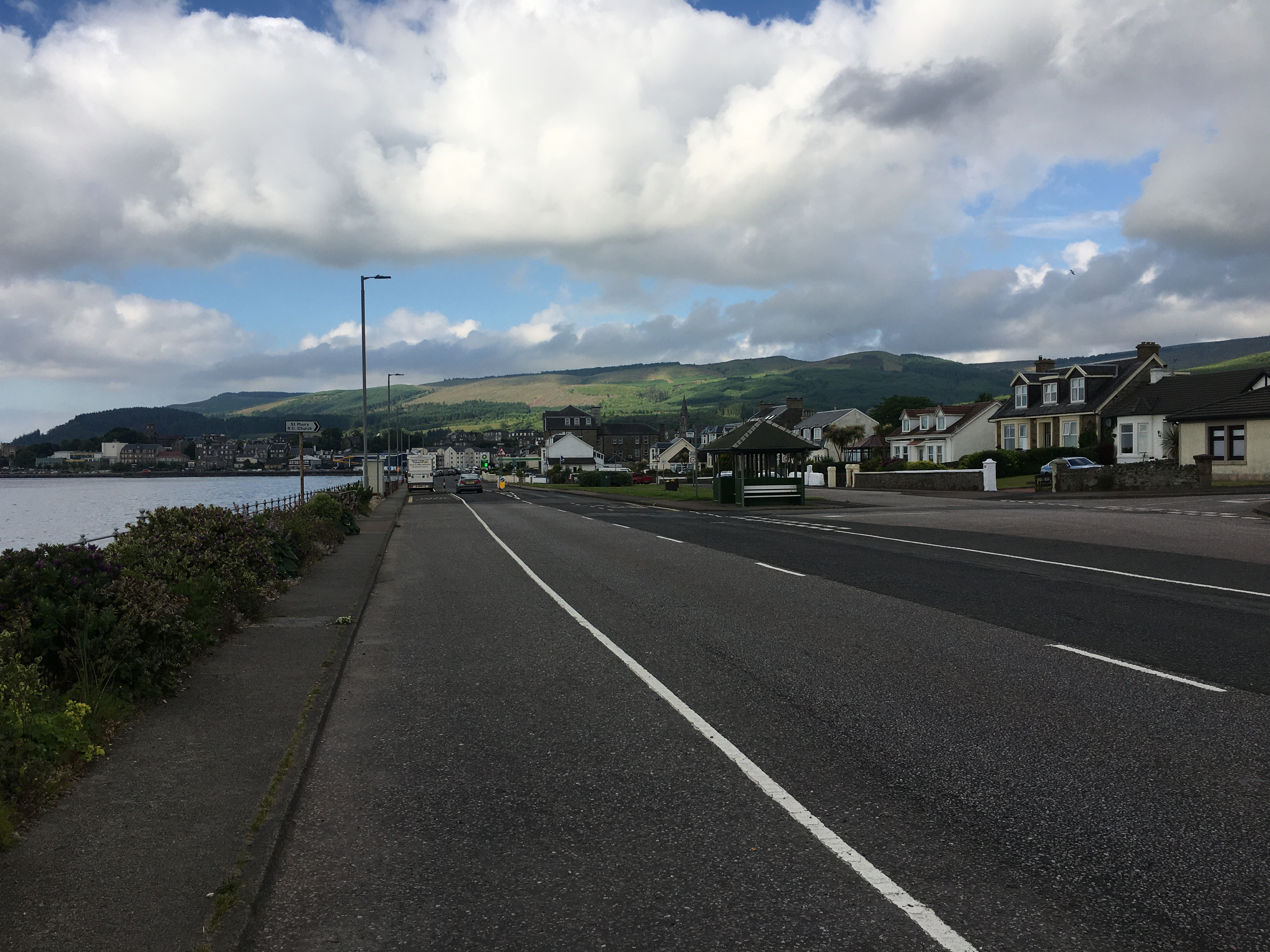
Looking south to Dunoon
