= Royal Marine Hotel =

Architectural structure in Argyll and Bute, Scotland

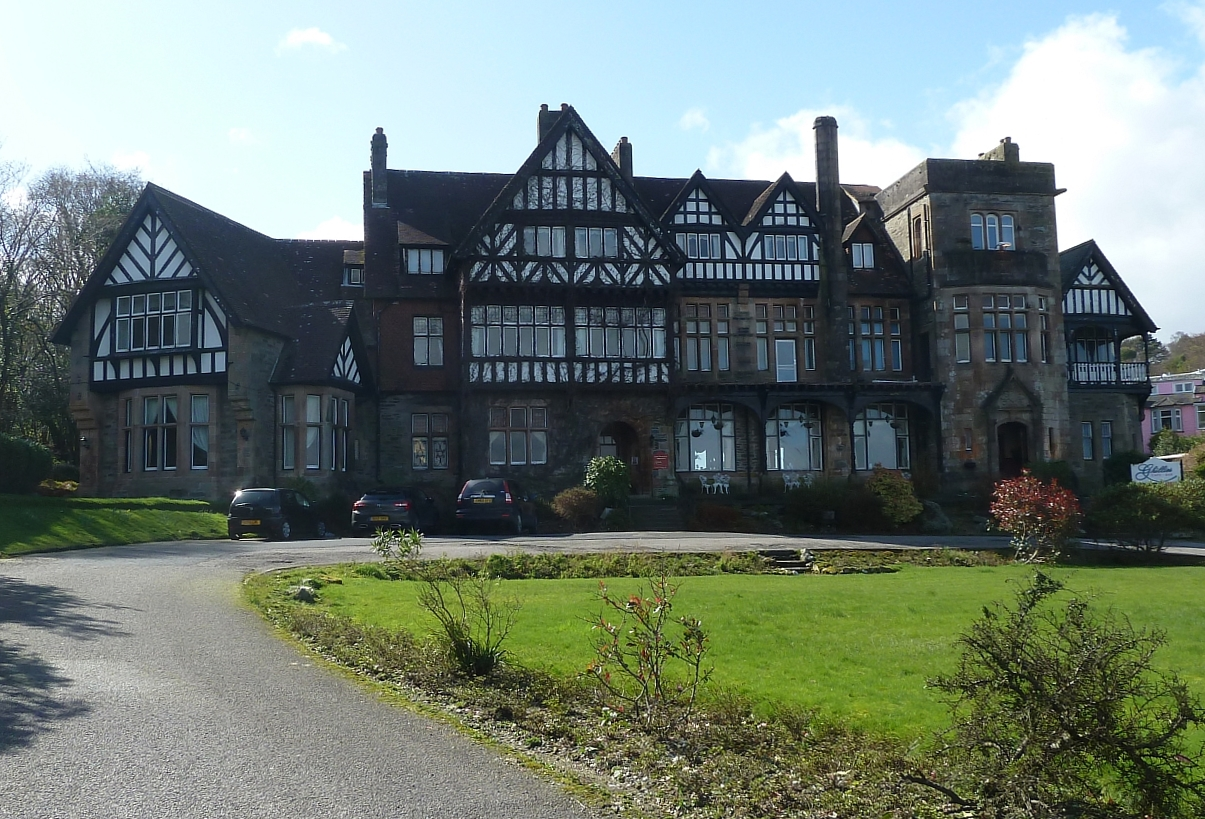
- The Royal Marine Hotel in 2014
- Interactive map of the Royal Marine Hotel area

General information
- Location: 251 Marine Parade, Hunters Quay, Argyll and Bute, Scotland
- Coordinates: 55.970131°N 4.910512°W
- Opening: 1890

Technical details
- Floor count: 3

Design and construction
- Architect: Thomas Lennox Watson

Other information
- Number of rooms: 41 (31 in main building; 10 in adjacent lodge)
- Number of restaurants: 1
- Number of bars: 2

Website
- Royal Marine Hotel

The Royal Marine Hotel is a hotel located on Marine Parade in Hunters Quay, Argyll and Bute, Scotland. It is a Category B listed building, opened in 1890 after the original 1856 building, named Marine Hotel, was gutted by fire. Its architect was Glasgow's Thomas Lennox Watson. The new construction received royal patronage in 1872.

Between 1872 and the 1950s, the building was also the home of the Royal Clyde Yacht Club, which was founded in 1856.

The small, former post office at the hotel was built around 1888 as a telegraph office for receiving news and results of the various yacht races taking place off the bay. As of 2014 it was used as a coffee shop. The adjacent wall-set post box is a large 'A' size example, dating from the end of the reign of Queen Victoria. It has a canted rainguard over the opening and the raised VR insignia and crown.

The hotel stands across Marine Parade from the Western Ferries pier, with ferries running between Hunters Quay and McInroy's Point across the Firth of Clyde in Gourock.

Its restaurant is named the Kintyre Bar and Restaurant. There is also a bar named Ghillies Bar.

== Gallery ==
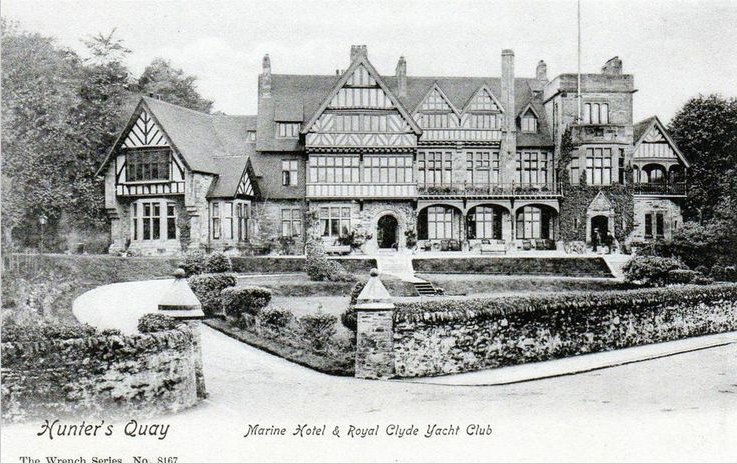
The Royal Clyde Yacht Club in 1908

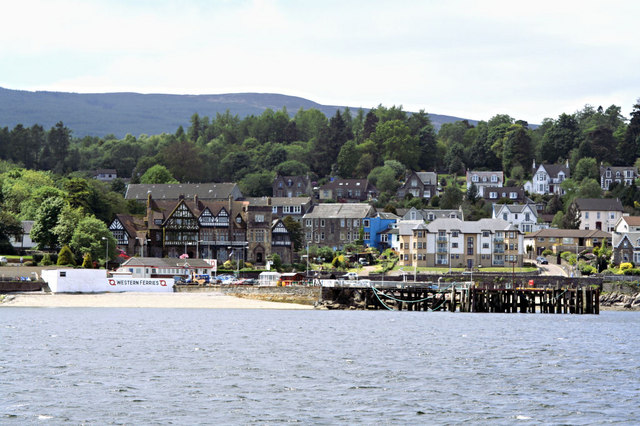
View from the Clyde

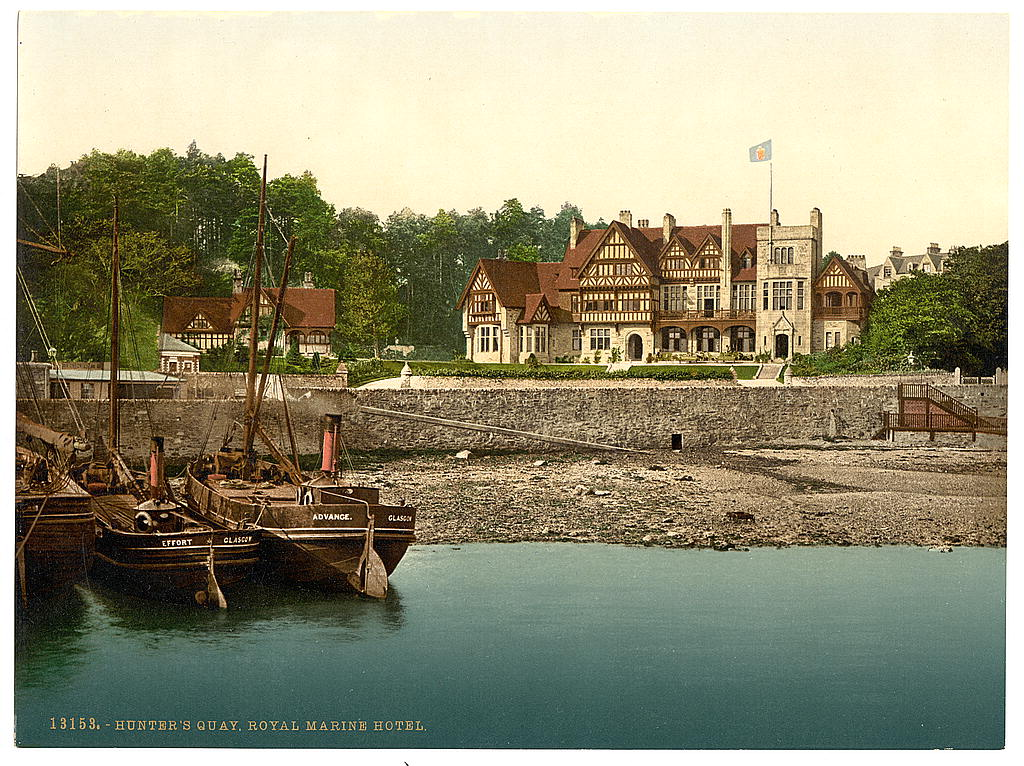
The property around 1895

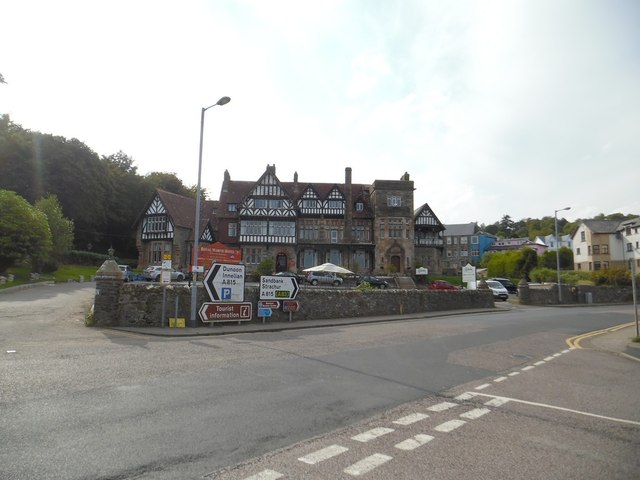
A view showing the building's location, on the A815, at the head of the access road to the Western Ferries pier

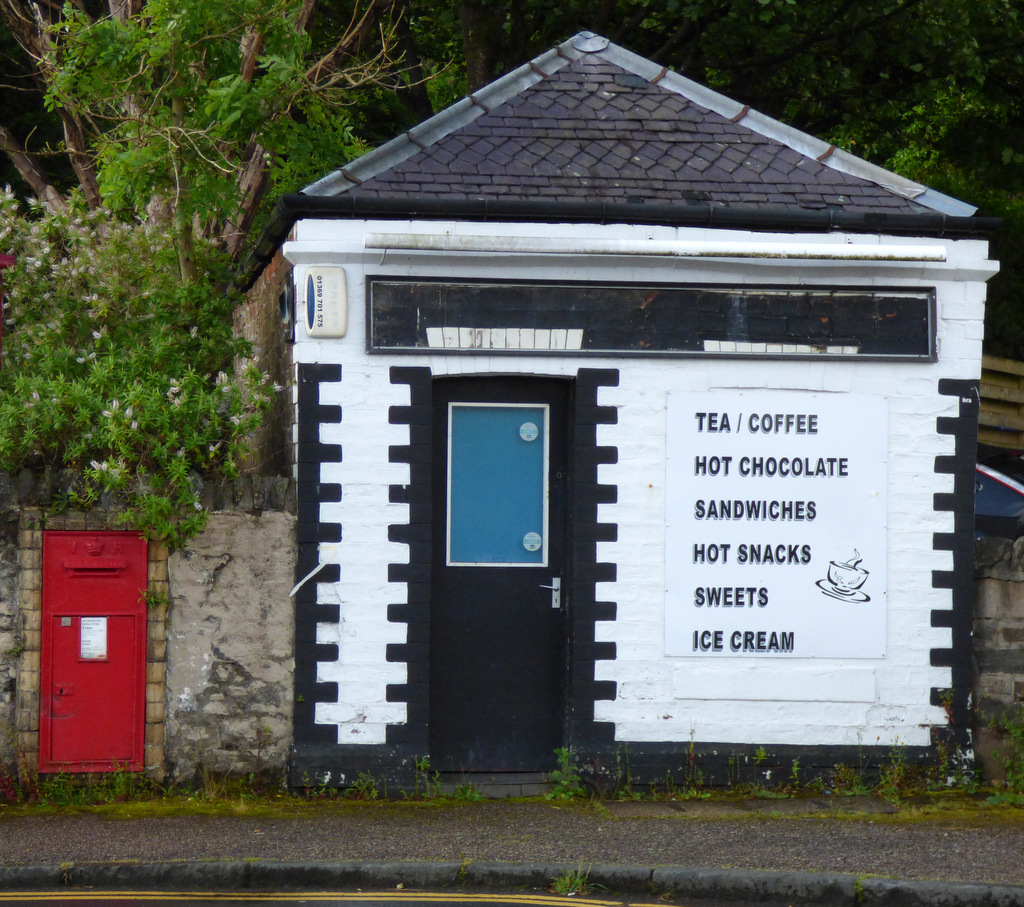
A 2019 view of the hotel's coffee shop (formerly its post office)

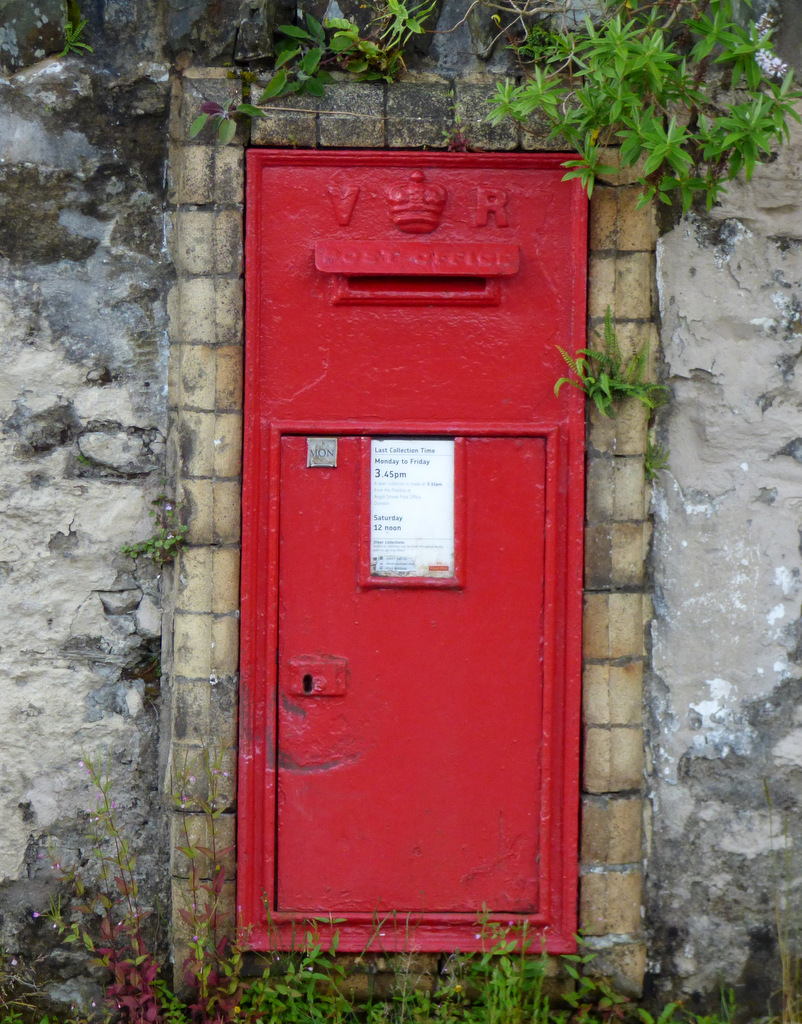
A close-up of the postbox set into a wall on the property
