= James MacArthur Moir =

Scottish landowner

- Died: 1872
- Occupations: miller, landowner

James MacArthur Moir (died 1872) was a Scottish miller and laird. He owned a large tract of land in Dunoon, Argyll and Bute, which was partly built on his Milton estate. McArthur (sic) and Moir Streets in the town are named for him.

What is now known as Dunoon's East Bay was originally named Milton Bay. Milton Burn still runs south and east through Dunoon and discharges into East Bay.

== Early life ==
Moir was born to John MacArthur Moir, of Milton and Hillfoot, and Catherine Alexander.

== Later life ==
In the 1870s, MacArthur donated his land known as Gallowhill to the burgh. Construction of Dunoon Burgh Hall was begun in 1873, but Moir did not see the completed structure, having committed suicide the previous year.

== See also ==
- Clan Arthur
