= Loch Loskin =

Loch in Argyll and Bute, Scotland

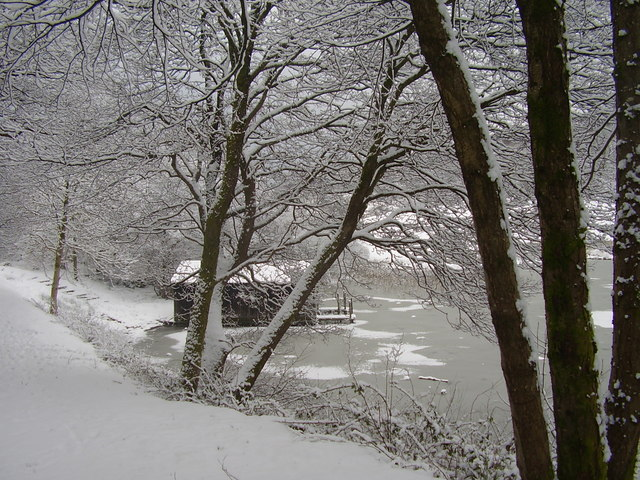
- Loch Loskin in February 2009

- Location within Argyll and Bute
- Location: Ardnadam, Argyll and Bute, Scotland
- Coordinates: 55.966053°N 4.9336896°W, grid reference NS 16995 78670
- Type: Freshwater Loch
- Primary outflows: Milton Burn
- Catchment area: Cowal
- Basin countries: Scotland, United Kingdom
- Surface elevation: 28 m (92 ft)
- Islands: 0

Loch Loskin is a freshwater loch in Ardnadam, Argyll and Bute, Scotland. The outflow from the loch is the Milton Burn, which winds its way through Dunoon to the Firth of Clyde. The A885 road, from Sandbank and known as the "High Road" locally, passes the loch.

== Nature ==
There are several beautiful sylvan walks in the neighbourhood. One of these is that which leads by the little freshwater lake, Lochenloskin, to Dunoon. Lochenloskin is the favourite haunt of the waterlily, where absolutely acres of the surface are covered with the snow-white blossoms of the plant.

— Colegate's Guide to Dunoon, Kirn, and Hunter's Quay (John Colegate, 1868)

== Fishing ==
Loch Loskin is stocked with brown trout by Dunoon and District Angling Club.

== Loch Loskin strathspey ==
The Loch Loskin strathspey was composed by Roderick Campbell.
