= List of places in Argyll and Bute =

List of settlements in Argyll and Bute council area

This List of places in Argyll and Bute is a list of links for any town, village and hamlet in the Argyll and Bute council area of Scotland.

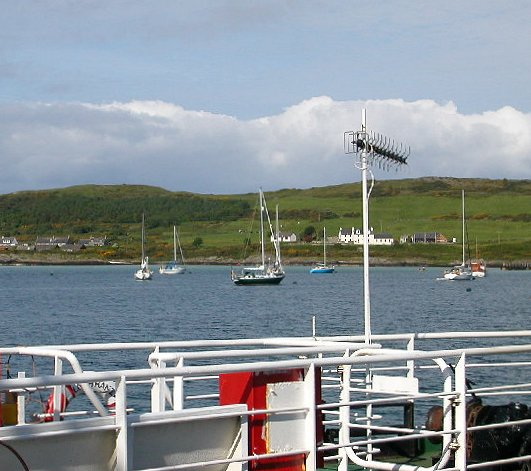
Ardminish Bay, Gigha

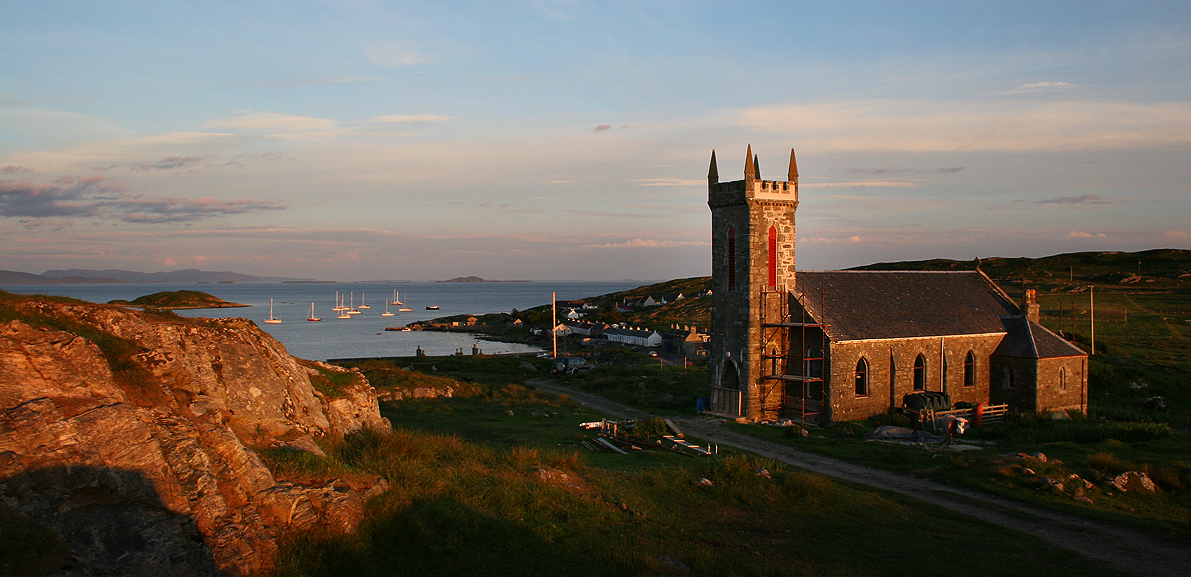
Arinagour, Coll

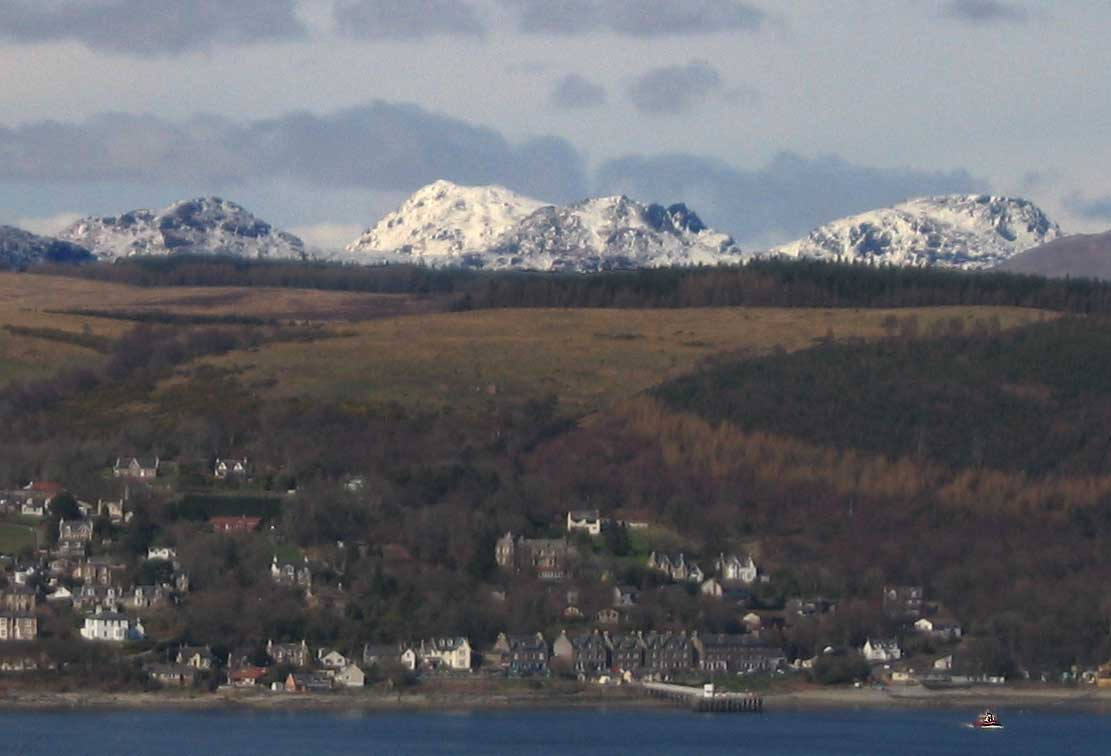
Arrochar Alps

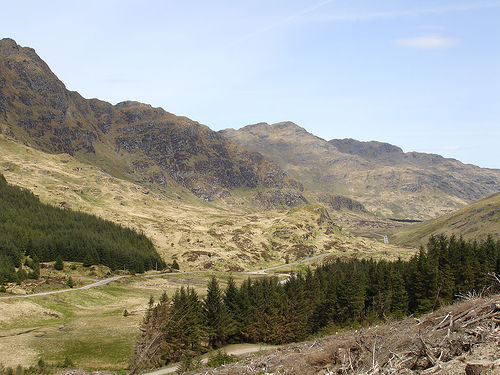
Ben Donich

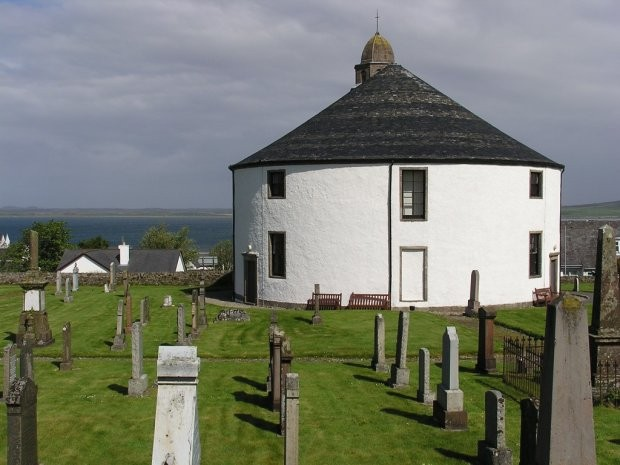
Bowmore Round Church

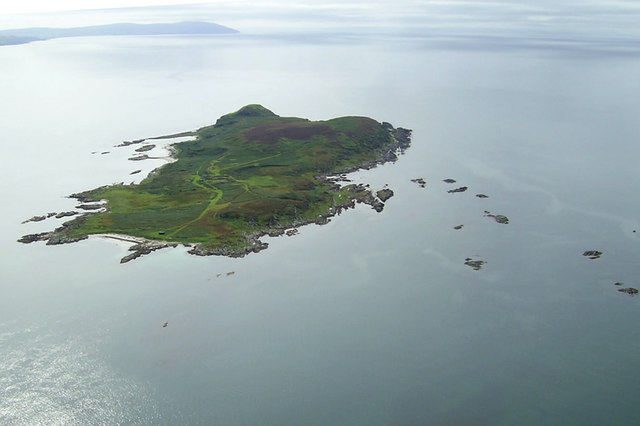
Cara Island

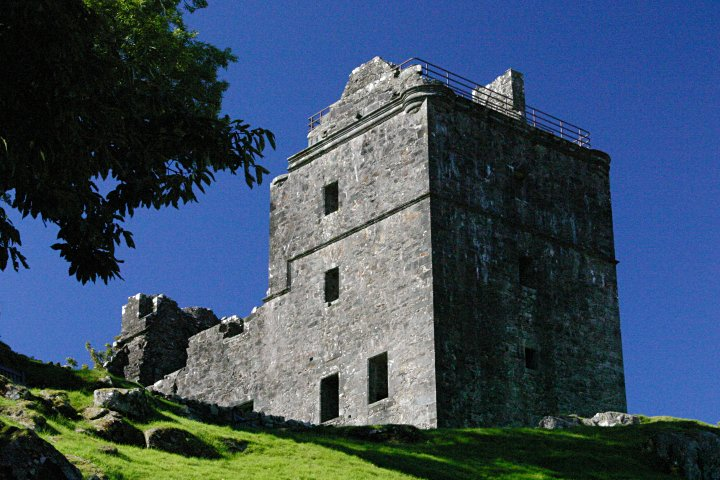
Carnasserie Castle

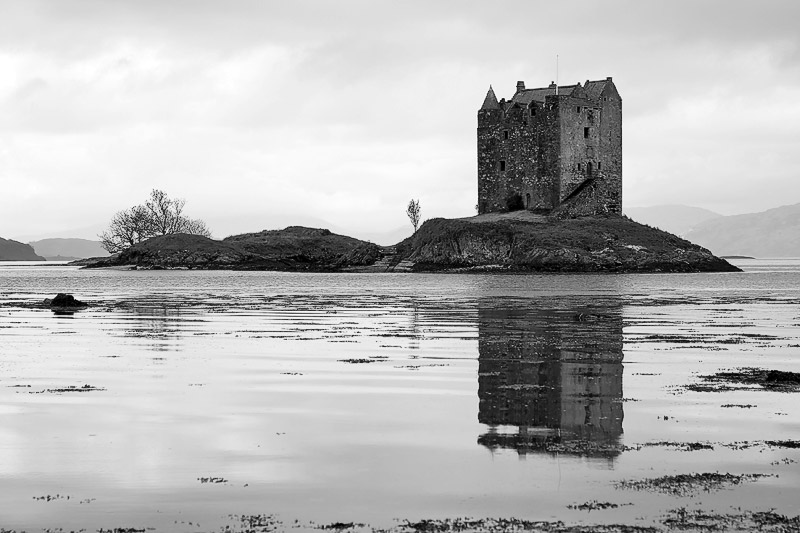
Castle Stalker

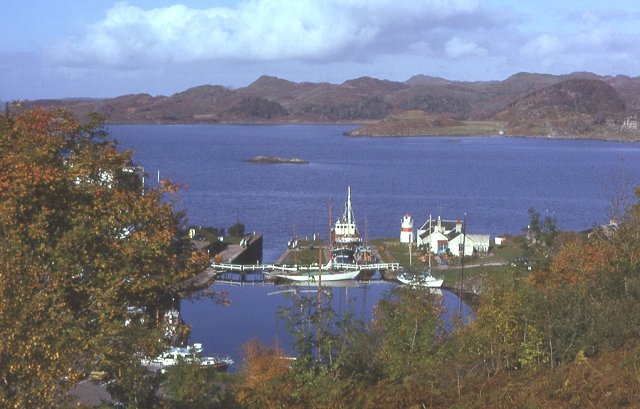
Crinan

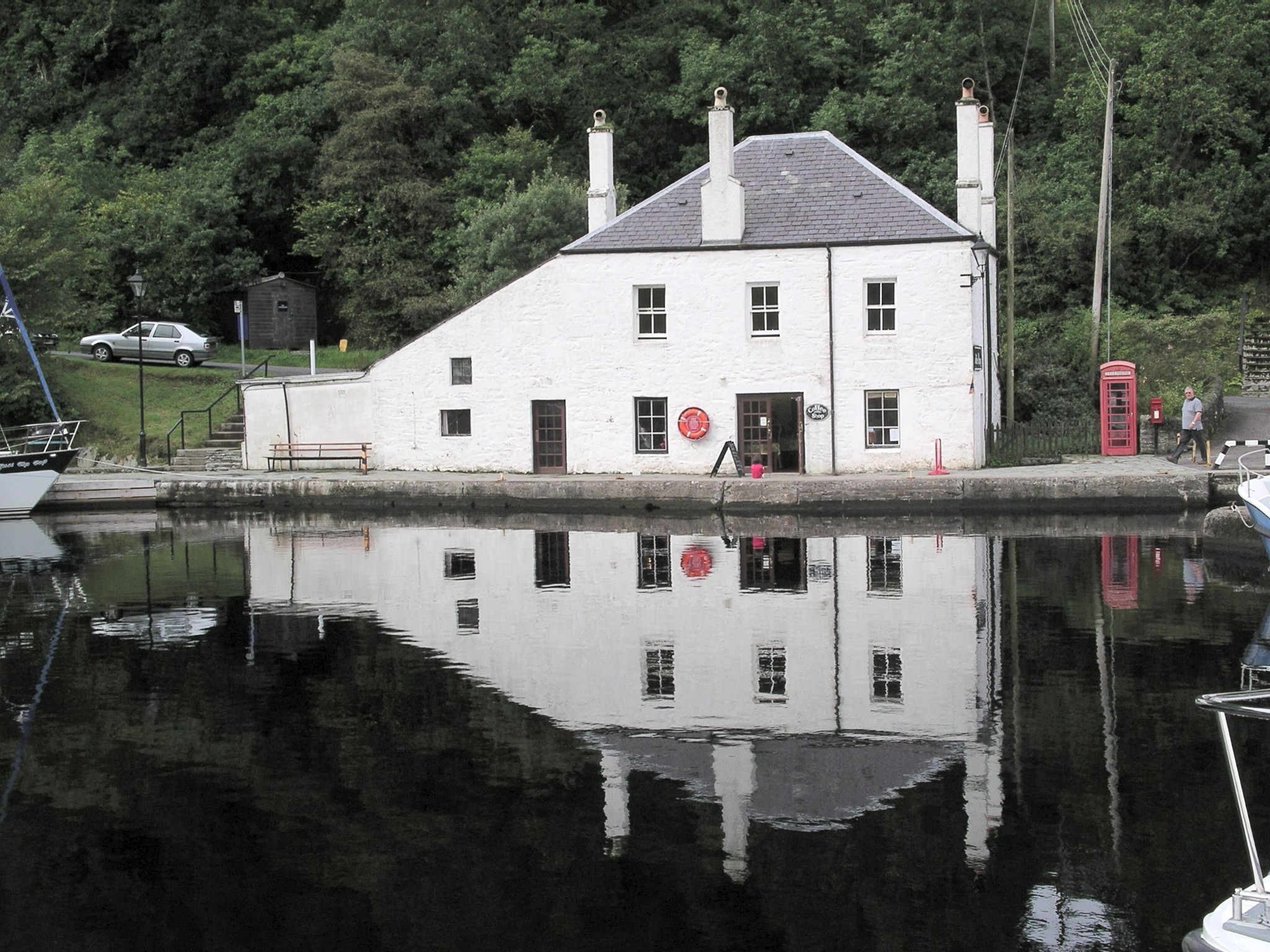
Crinan Canal

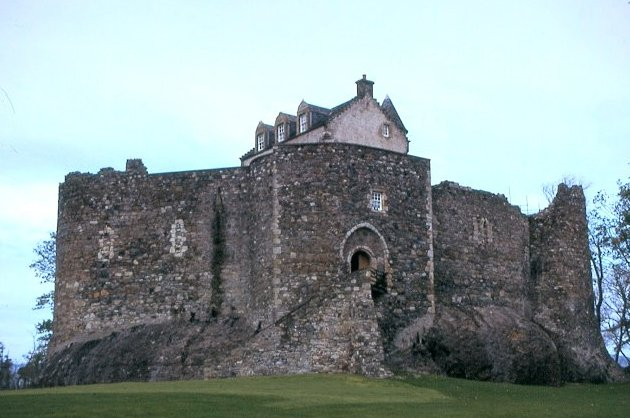
Dunstaffnage Castle

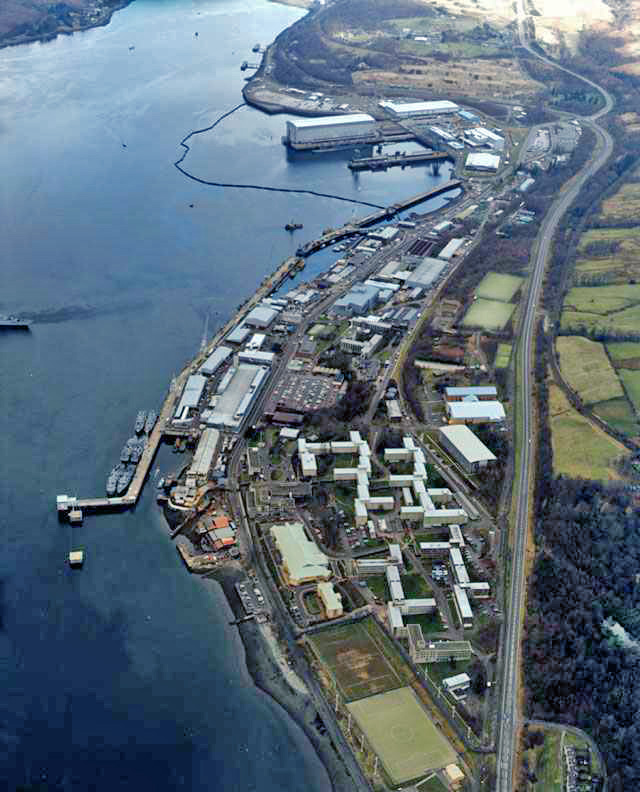
Faslane Naval Base

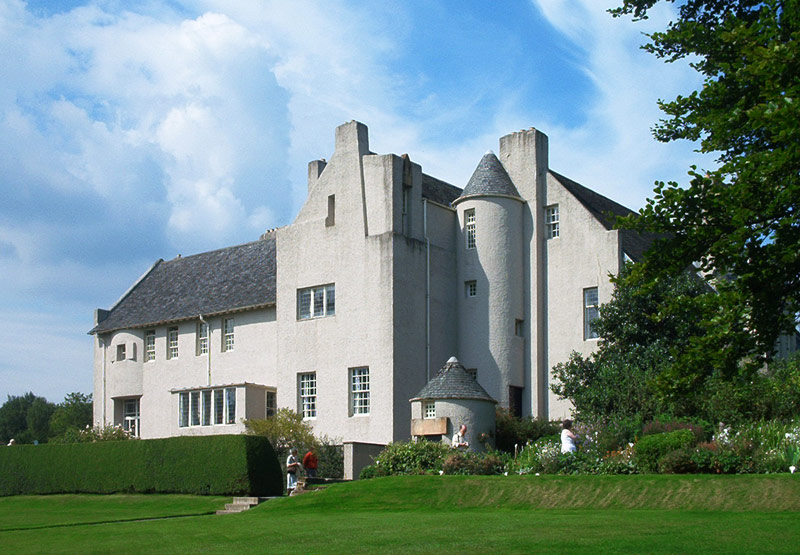
Hill House, Helensburgh (Charles Rennie Mackintosh)

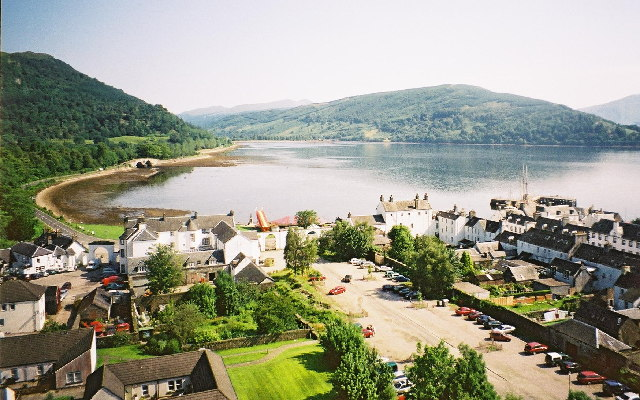
Inveraray

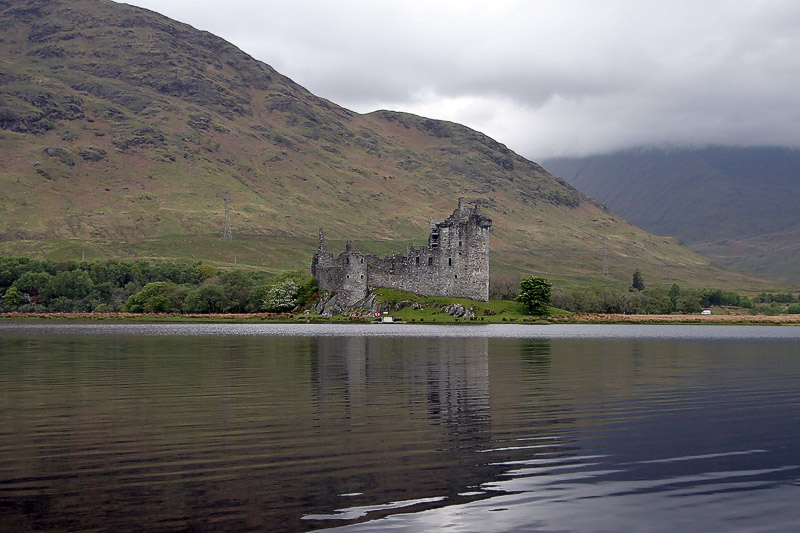
Kilchurn Castle

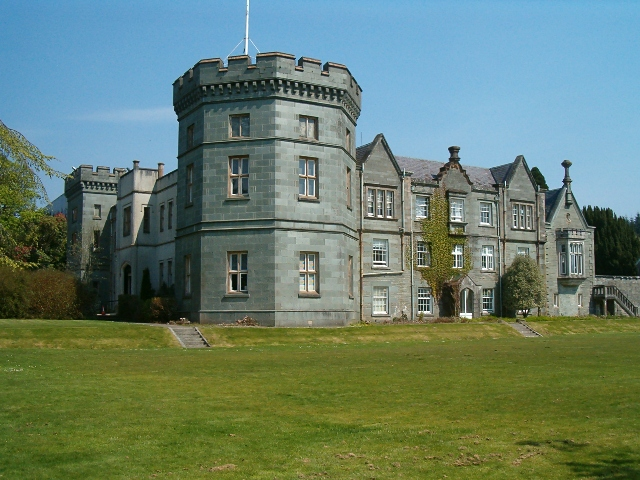
Kilmory Castle

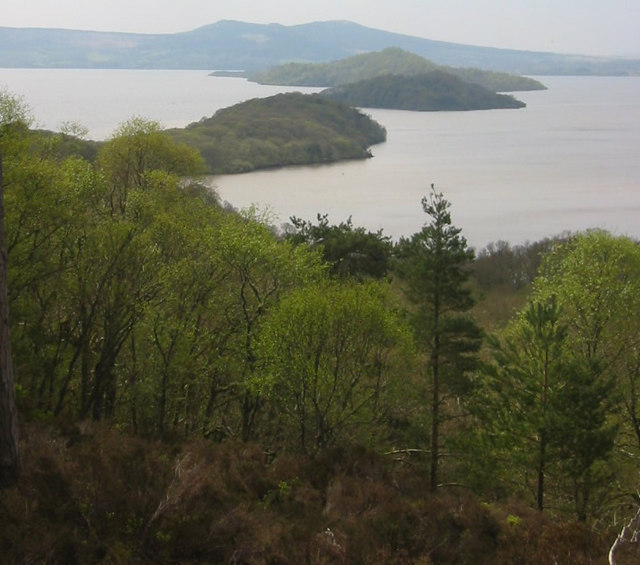
Lomond Islands

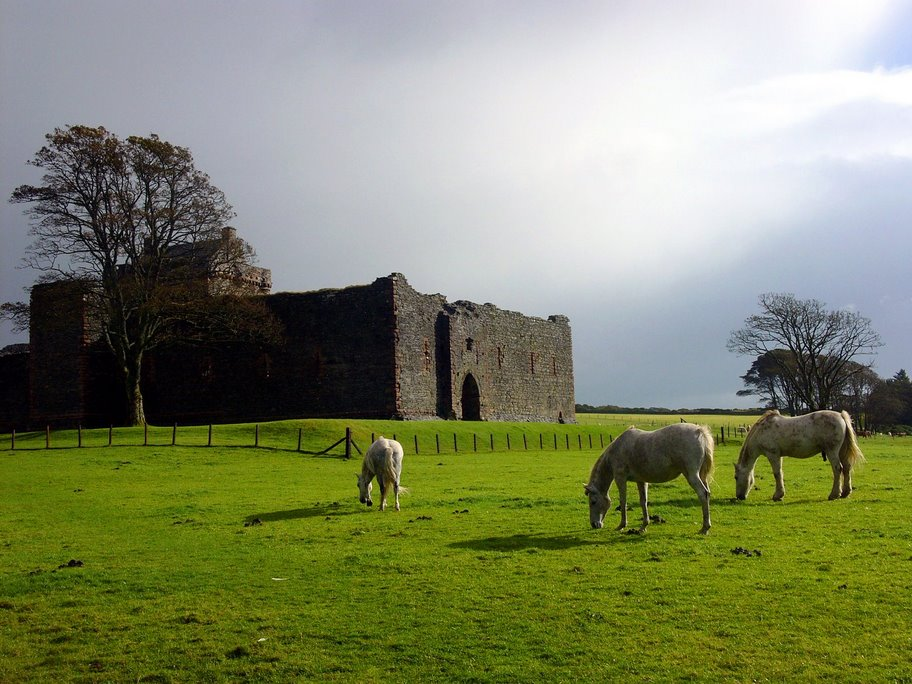
Skipness Castle

== A ==
- Achahoish
- Achanduin, Achanduin Castle
- Achinhoan
- Airdeny
- Aldlochlay
- Aldochlay
- Appin
- Ardbeg, Bute
- Ardbeg, Islay
- Arden
- Ardentinny
- Ardfern
- Ardgartan
- Ardkinglas
- Ardlui
- Ardmay
- Ardnadam
- Ardpeaton
- Ardrishaig
- Arduaine
- Arinagour
- Arrochar
- Ascrib Islands
- Asgog Castle, Asgog Loch
- Auchenbreck Castle

== B ==
- Barcaldine, Barcaldine Castle
- Beinn Dorain
- Bellochantuy
- Ben Cruachan
- Ben Donich
- Benderloch
- Benmore, Benmore Botanic Garden
- Bernice
- Blairmore, Argyll
- Blairglas
- Bonawe
- Bowmore
- Breachacha Castle
- Burnt Islands
- Bute
- Butterbridge

== C ==
- Cairnbaan
- Cairndow
- Campbeltown, Campbeltown Airport, Campbeltown and Machrihanish Light Railway
- Cara Island
- Cardross, Cardross railway station
- Carnasserie Castle
- Carradale
- Carrick Castle (village), Carrick Castle
- Castle Lachlan (Old Castle Lachlan, New Castle Lachlan)
- Castle MacEwen
- Castle Stalker
- Castle Sween
- Castle Toward
- Clachaig
- Clachan Bridge
- Clachan of Glendaruel
- Cladich
- Clynder
- Coeffin Castle
- Colintraive, Colintraive Hotel
- Coll, Coll Airport
- Colonsay, Colonsay Airport
- Connel, Connel Ferry railway station
- Corra Loch
- Coulport, RNAD Coulport
- Cove
- Cowal
- Coylet
- Craigendoran
- Craighouse
- Craighoyle
- Craignish
- Craignure
- Craobh Haven
- Crarae
- Crinan, Crinan Canal
- Cruachan Power Station

== D ==
- Dalavich
- Dalmally, Dalmally railway station
- Island Davaar
- Druimdrishaig
- Drumlemble
- Duchlage
- Dunans Castle
- Dunbeg
- Dunoon, Dunoon Castle, Dunoon Pier, Dunoon Burgh Hall, Dunoon Stadium, Dunoon Primary School, Dunoon Grammar School
- Dunstaffnage Castle
- Duntrune Castle
- Duror

== E ==
- Eckford House
- Edentaggart
- Eilean Dubh

== F ==
- Faslane, Faslane Castle
- Fincharn Castle
- Fingal's Cave
- Firth of Clyde
- Firth of Lorne
- Fladda, Slate Islands
- Fladda, Treshnish Isles
- Ford
- Furnace

== G ==
- Gare Loch
- Garelochhead
- Geal Loch
- Geilston
- Gigha
- Glen Fruin
- Glenbarr
- Glenbranter
- Glendaruel
- Glen Finart
- Glen Lean
- Glensluan
- Glunimore Island
- Gometra
- Gulf of Corryvreckan
- Gunna

== H ==
- Hafton House
- Helensburgh
- Hill House
- HMNB Clyde, HMS Vanguard, HMS Vengeance, HMS Victorious, HMS Vigilant
- Holy Loch
- Hunters Quay

== I ==
- Inchmarnock
- Innellan
- Inveraray
- Inverbeg
- Inverchaolain, Inverchaolain Church
- Invergroin
- Inveruglas
- Iona
- Islay, Islay Airport

== J ==
- Jura

== K ==
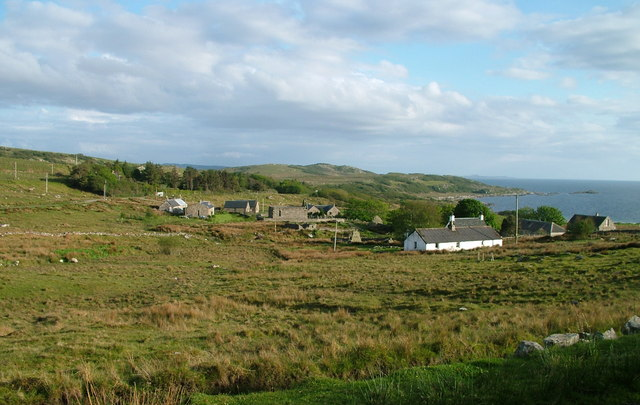
Kilmory in Knapdale

- Kames
- Keillmore
- Keills Chapel
- Kerrera
- Kilberry
- Kilbride
- Kilchenzie
- Kilchurn Castle
- Kilcreggan
- Kilfinan
- Kilmartin, Kilmartin Glen, Kilmartin Castle
- Kilmelford
- Kilmodan, Kilmodan Church, Kilmodan Carved Stones
- Kilmore
- Kilmory, Knapdale
- Kilmory Castle, Kilmory Knap Chapel
- Kilmun, Kilmun Parish Church and Argyll Mausoleum
- Kilninver
- Kintyre
- Kirn, Dunoon
- Knapdale, Knapdale Forest
- Kyles of Bute

== L ==
- Lagavulin, Lagavulin Distillery
- Lismore
- Loch Awe
- Loch Creran
- Loch Eck
- Loch Etive
- Loch Fyne
- Loch Gilp
- Loch Goil
- Loch Linnhe
- Loch Lomond, Loch Lomond and The Trossachs National Park
- Loch Lomond and Cowal Way
- Loch Long
- Loch Loskin
- Loch Restil
- Loch Ruel
- Loch Sloy Hydro-Electric Scheme
- Loch Sween
- Loch Tarsan
- Lochgair
- Lochgilphead
- Lochgoilhead
- Luing
- Lunga, Firth of Lorn
- Lunga, Treshnish Isles
- Luss

== M ==
- Machrihanish
- Millhouse, Argyll
- Millhouse, Bute
- Minard
- Mount Stuart House
- Muasdale
- Mull
- Mull of Kintyre

== N ==
- National Cycle Route 75
- New Castle Lachlan

== O ==
- Oban, Oban Airport
- Old Castle Lachlan
- Ormsary
- Otter Ferry

== P ==
- Peninver
- Porincaple
- Port Askaig
- Port Bannatyne
- Port Charlotte
- Port Ellen
- Portavadie
- Portincaple
- Portkil
- Portnahaven

== R ==
- Rahane
- Rest & Be Thankful
- Rhu
- Rhubodach
- River Eachaig
- River Orchy
- Rosneath, Rosneath Peninsula, Rosneath House
- Rothesay, Rothesay Castle
- Royal Marine Hotel

== S ==
- Saddell, Saddell Abbey, Saddell Castle
- Sanda Island
- Sandbank
- Scarba
- Seil
- Shandon, Shandon Castle
- Sheep Island
- Shuna, Slate Islands
- Shuna Island, Loch Linnhe
- Skipness, Skipness Castle
- Southend
- St Michael's Chapel
- Staffa
- St Catherines, Argyll
- Stewarton
- Strachur, Strachur House
- Strone, St Columba's Church, Strone
- Stuckgowan
- Succoth

== T ==
- Tarbert, Jura
- Tarbert, Kintyre
- Tarbet, Argyll
- Tayinloan
- Taynuilt
- Tayvallich
- Texa
- Tighnabruaich
- Tiree, Tiree Airport
- Tobermory
- Torinturk
- Toward, Toward Lighthouse, Castle Toward, Toward Castle

== U ==
- Ulva

== W ==
- West Highland Line
- West Highland Way
- Whistlefield, Whistlefield Inn
- Whitehouse

== See also ==
- List of places in Scotland
- List of islands of Scotland
