= Argyll and Bute =

Council area of Scotland

Argyll and Bute: Earra-Ghaidheal agus Bòd (Scottish Gaelic); Argyll an Buit (Scots)
- Council area
- Coat of arms
- Motto: Seas ar coir ("Maintain our right")
- Argyll and Bute shown within Scotland
- Coordinates: 56.1°N 5.5°W
- Sovereign state: United Kingdom
- Country: Scotland
- Lieutenancy area: Argyll and Bute; Dunbartonshire (part)
- Unitary authority: 1 April 1996
- Administrative HQ: Kilmory Castle

Government
  - Type: Council
  - Body: Argyll and Bute Council
  - Control: No overall control
  - MPs: Brendan O'Hara (SNP)
  - MSPs: 2 MSPs: Jenni Minto (SNP); Jackie Baillie (L)

Area
  - Total: 2,666 sq mi (6,906 km^{2})
  - Rank: 2nd

Population (2025)
  - Total: 87,310
  - Rank: 27th
  - Density: 34/sq mi (13/km^{2})
- Time zone: UTC+0 (GMT)
  - Summer (DST): UTC+1 (BST)
- ISO 3166 code: GB-AGB
- GSS code: S12000035
- Website: argyll-bute.gov.uk

Argyll and Bute (Scots: Argyll an Buit; Scottish Gaelic: Earra-Ghàidheal agus Bòd, pronounced [ɛrˠəˈɣɛːəl̪ˠ akəs̪ ˈpɔːtʲ]) is one of 32 unitary council areas in Scotland and a lieutenancy area. The current lord-lieutenant for Argyll and Bute is Jane Margaret MacLeod (14 July 2020). The administrative centre for the council area is the town of Lochgilphead.

Argyll and Bute covers the second-largest administrative area of any Scottish council. The council area adjoins those of Highland, Perth and Kinross, Stirling and West Dunbartonshire.

== History ==
The County of Bute and the County of Argyll were two of the historic counties of Scotland. They were both "shires" (context; the area controlled by a sheriff) in the Middle Ages. From 1890 until 1975 both counties had individual separate elected county councils.

In 1975, under the Local Government (Scotland) Act 1973, Scotland's counties, burghs and landward districts were abolished and replaced with upper-tier regions and lower-tier districts. The Strathclyde region was created covering a large part of western Scotland. Strathclyde was divided into nineteen districts, one of which the 1973 Act called "Argyll", covering most of the former county of Argyll, but also including the Isle of Bute from the County of Bute. The shadow authority elected in 1974 requested a change of name to "Argyll and Bute", which was agreed by the government before the new district came into being on 16 May 1975.

As created in 1975, the Argyll and Bute district covered the whole area of fourteen of Argyll's sixteen districts and part of a fifteenth, plus two from the County of Bute's five districts, which were all abolished at the same time:

From the County of Argyll:

- Campbeltown Burgh
- Cowal District
- Dunoon Burgh
- Inveraray Burgh
- Islay District
- Jura and Colonsay District
- Kintyre District
- Lochgilphead Burgh
- Mid Argyll District
- Mull District
- North Lorn District: the Lismore and Appin, and Ardchattan electoral divisions only, rest (Ballachulish and Kinlochleven electoral divisions) went to Lochaber district of Highland
- Oban Burgh
- South Lorn District
- Tiree and Coll District
- Tobermory Burgh

From the County of Bute:

- Bute District
- Rothesay Burgh

The two County of Bute districts together corresponded to the whole Isle of Bute. The rest of the County of Bute, being the Isle of Arran and the Cumbraes, went to Cunninghame district. The Ardnamurchan district from Argyll went to the Lochaber district of Highland. The new district was made a single Argyll and Bute lieutenancy area.

Local government was reformed again in 1996 under the Local Government etc. (Scotland) Act 1994, which abolished the regions and districts created in 1975, replacing them with unitary council areas. Argyll and Bute became one of the new council areas, but had its territory enlarged to include the town of Helensburgh and surrounding rural areas, which had been in the Dumbarton district prior to 1996, and had formed part of the county of Dunbartonshire prior to 1975. The Helensburgh area had voted in a referendum in 1994 to join Argyll and Bute rather than stay with Dumbarton.

== Council ==
The council is based in Lochgilphead at Kilmory Castle, a 19th-century Gothic Revival building and estate. Politically, the council has been under no overall control since 2007. Since April 2024 it has been governed by a coalition of the Scottish National Party (SNP), the Scottish Liberal Democrats, Scottish Labour, the Scottish Greens and some independent councillors, all under the leadership of Councillor Jim Lynch of the SNP.

== Transport ==
=== Railways ===
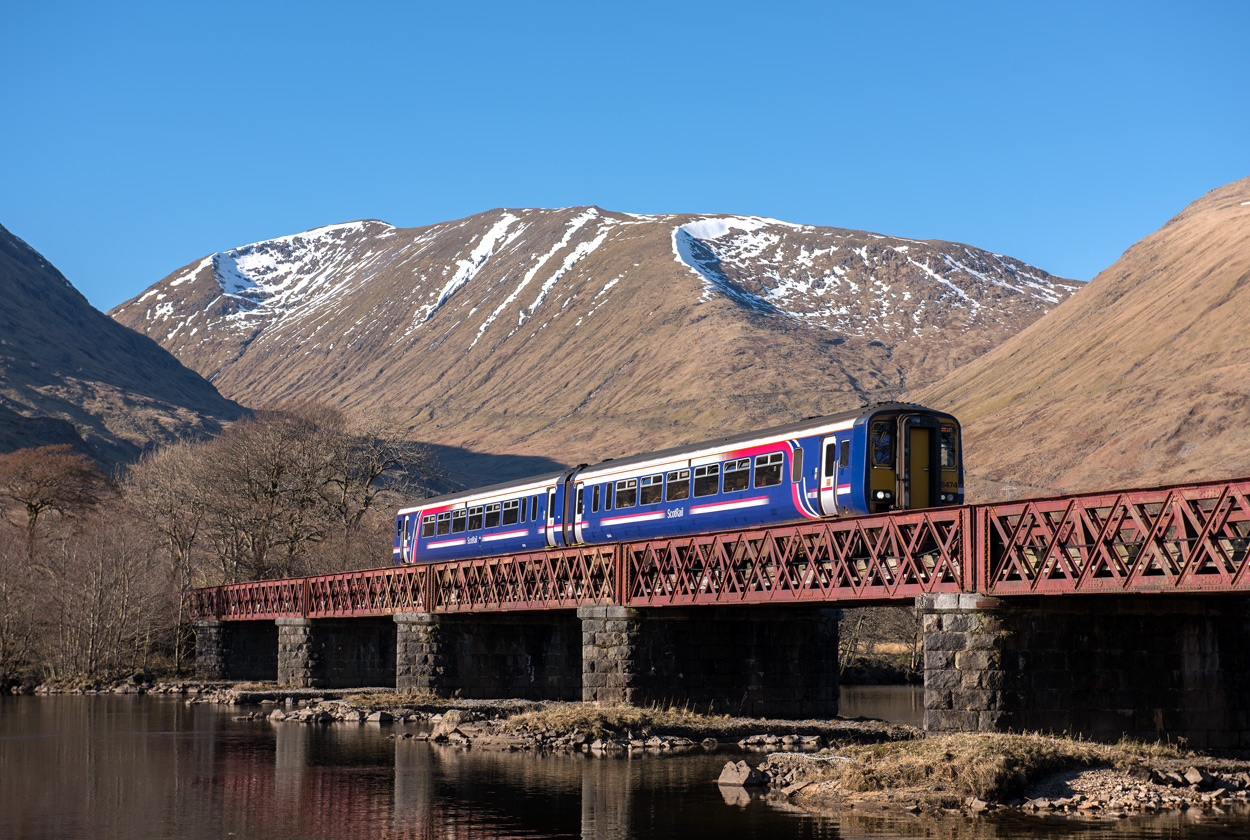
A train crossing Loch Awe

The main railway line in Argyll and Bute is the West Highland Line, which links Oban to Glasgow, passing through much of the eastern and northern parts of the area. From the south the line enters Argyll and Bute just to the west of Dumbarton, continuing north via Helensburgh Upper to the eastern shores of the Gare Loch and Loch Long. The line comes inland at Arrochar and Tarbet to meet the western shore of Loch Lomond. At the northern end of the loch the line leaves Argyll and Bute to enter Stirling council area. The Oban branch of the West Highland Line re-enters the area just west of Tyndrum, and heads west to Oban: stations on this section of the line include Dalmally and Taynuilt. The majority of services on the line are operated by ScotRail: as of 2019 the summer service has six trains a day to Oban, with four on Sundays. In addition to the ScotRail service is the nightly Caledonian Sleeper, although this does not run on the Oban branch.

Helensburgh also has a much more frequent service into Glasgow and beyond via the North Clyde Line, which has its western terminus at the town's central railway station.

=== Roads ===
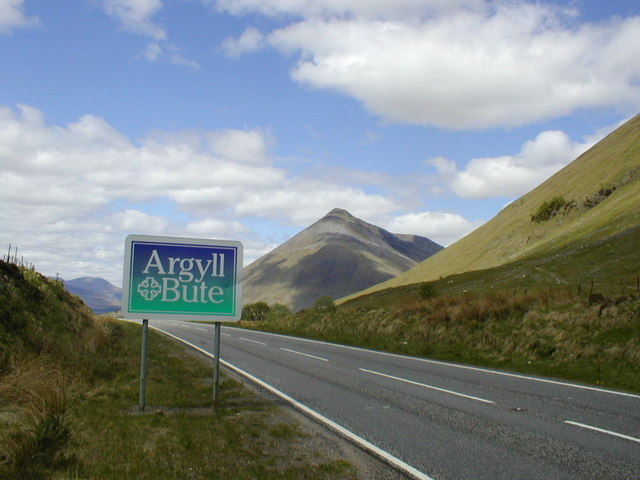
The A82, looking north

The main trunk roads in Argyll and Bute are:

- The A82, which runs along the western shore of Loch Lomond, providing the main route between Glasgow and Fort William.
- The A83, which leaves the A82 at Tarbet, heading west and then south to eventually reach Campbeltown by way of Inveraray and Lochgilphead.
- The A85, which leaves the A82 at Tyndrum (just outside Argyll and Bute) and heads west to Oban via Dalmally.
- The A828, which leaves the A85 at Connel and north through Appin to join the A82 at Ballachulish.
- The A815, which leaves the A83 in Glen Kinglas near Cairndow, heading south through Strachur and Dunoon and ends at Toward 40 miles later, on the southern tip of the Cowal peninsula. The A815 is the main road through Cowal.
- The A886, which leaves the A815 at Strachur, passing through Glendaruel, the route includes a ferry link to the Isle of Bute, Colintraive - Rhubodach terminating at Port Bannatyne to the north of Rothesay.

=== Ferry services ===
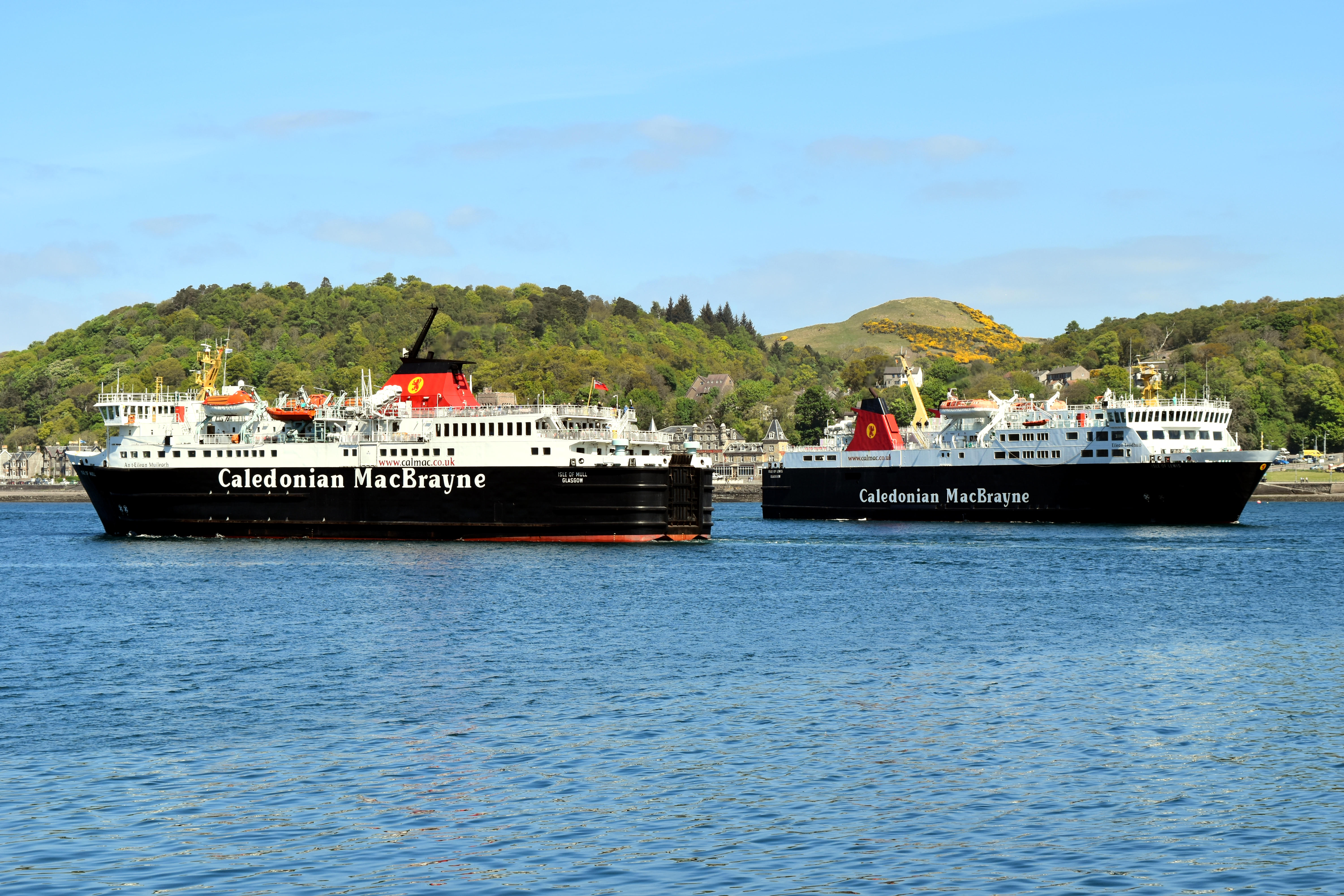
MV Isle of Mull and MV Isle of Lewis at Oban harbour, 2017

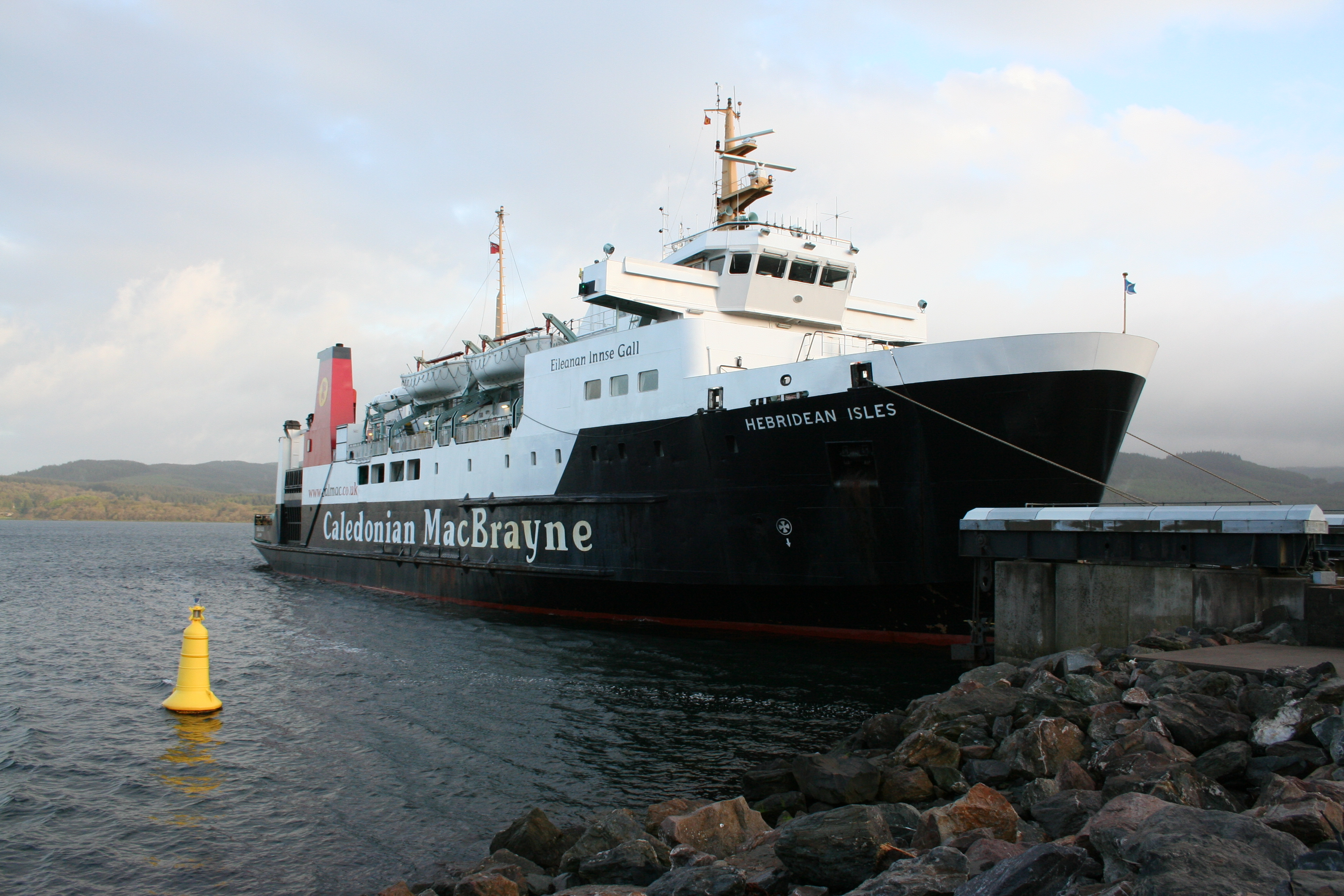
MV Hebridean Isles docked at Kennacraig

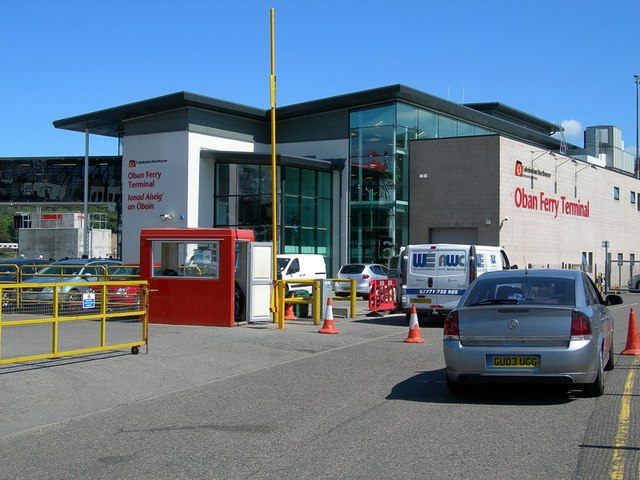
Oban Ferry Terminal

Due to its heavily indented coastline and many islands, ferries form an important part of the council area's transport system. The main ferry operator in Argyll and Bute is Caledonian MacBrayne (CalMac), which operates services from the mainland to most of the inhabited islands. Several other routes are operated by commercial operators, usually on contract to the council, although the Western Ferries service across the Firth of Clyde is run on a commercial basis.

- Bute is served by a route across the Kyles of Bute between Rhubodach and Colintraive in Cowal, as well as a route between Rothesay to Wemyss Bay in Inverclyde. Both routes are operated by CalMac.
- Coll and Tiree are each served from Oban, via a CalMac service that also provides links between the two islands, and a once-weekly link to Barra.
- Gigha is served by a CalMac route from Tayinloan in Kintyre.
- Islay is served by a CalMac route from Kennacraig in Kintyre. The service is timetabled to utilise either one of two ports on the island, with both Port Askaig and Port Ellen having a service to the mainland.
- Feolin on Jura is linked to Port Askaig on Islay via a vehicle ferry run by ASP Ship Management on behalf of Argyll and Bute Council. There is also a passenger-only service between the island's main centre, Craighouse, and Tayvallich on the mainland that is operated by Islay Sea Safaris.
- Kerrera is linked to Gallanach (about 3 km (1.9 mi) southwest of Oban) by a passenger-only service operated by CalMac.
- Lismore is served by two ferries, a vehicle and passenger service operated by CalMac that runs from Oban, and a passenger-only service from Port Appin that is operated by ASP Ship Management on behalf of Argyll and Bute Council.
- Mull is served by a route between Oban and Craignure on the island's east coast, as well as routes across the Sound of Mull (between Lochaline and Fishnish, and Tobermory and Kilchoan). All three routes are operated by CalMac.
  - Iona is linked to Mull via a CalMac service from Fionnphort at Mull's southwest tip.
- The island of Seil, which itself is linked to the mainland via the Clachan Bridge, has links to two further islands: Easdale and Luing. Both services are operated by ASP Ship Management on behalf of Argyll and Bute Council.

There are also routes connecting some mainland locations in Argyll and Bute to other parts of the mainland:

- There is a CalMac service across Loch Fyne which links Portavadie in Cowal and Tarbert in Kintyre.
- The Cowal peninsula route is a passenger-only service from the Dunoon Breakwater to Gourock pier, giving easy access to ScotRail services at Gourock railway station with onward transport to Glasgow Central station. This route was for a period run by a CalMac subsidiary company, Argyll Ferries, but has since January 2019 been operated directly by CalMac.
- CalMac provides a limited (3 ferries each way per week) service between Campbeltown in Kintyre and Ardrosssan in North Ayrshire during the summer months.
- Western Ferries, a commercial operator, runs a vehicle and passenger service between Hunters Quay and McInroy's Point that also provides a link between Cowal and Inverclyde in (partial) competition with the subsidised CalMac service.
- A service operated by Clyde Marine Services on behalf of Strathclyde Partnership for Transport runs between Kilcreggan and Gourock pier, providing a link from the Rosneath peninsula to the rail network at Gourock.

Argyll and Bute also has ferry services linking it to islands in neighbouring council areas:

- Oban is the mainland terminal for services to Barra in Na h-Eileanan Siar (the Outer Hebrides).
- Lochranza on Arran, in North Ayrshire, has a year-round service to Kintyre: during the summer the mainland port used is Claonaig, however in winter the service is reduced to a single daily return crossing from Tarbert.

There is also a passenger-only ferry service linking Campbeltown and Port Ellen on Islay with Ballycastle in County Antrim, Northern Ireland, running seasonally from April to September, operated by West Coast Tours as the Kintyre Express.

== Demographics ==
=== Languages ===
The 2022 Scottish Census reported that out of 84,096 residents aged three and over, 20,434 (24.3%) considered themselves able to speak or read the Scots language.

The 2022 Scottish Census reported that out of 84,098 residents aged three and over, 3,637 (4.3%) considered themselves able to speak or read Gaelic. This puts Argyll and Bute as the council area with the third highest proficiency in Gaelic, below the Highlands and the Western Isles.

== Cultural references ==
The later scenes of the 1963 James Bond film From Russia with Love were filmed around the lochs and hills of Argyll and Bute.

The area has also been indirectly immortalised in popular culture by the 1977 hit song "Mull of Kintyre" by then-Kintyre resident Paul McCartney's band of the time, Wings.

== Communities ==
The area is divided into 56 community council areas, all of which have community councils as at 2023.

- Appin
- Ardchattan
- Ardentinny
- Ardrishaig
- Arrochar, Tarbet and Ardlui
- Avich and Kilchrenan
- Bute
- Cairndow
- Campbeltown
- Cardross
- Colintraive and Glendaruel
- Coll
- Colonsay
- Connel
- Cove and Kilcreggan
- Craignish
- Dunadd
- Dunbeg
- Dunoon
- East Kintyre
- Furnace
- Garelochhead
- Gigha
- Glenorchy and Innishail
- Helensburgh
- Hunters Quay
- Inveraray
- Iona
- Islay
- Jura
- Kilfinan
- Kilmun
- Kilninver and Kilmelford
- Kilmore and Kilbride
- North Knapdale
- The Laggan
- Lismore
- Lochgilphead
- Lochgoilhead
- Luing
- Luss and Arden
- Mull
- Oban
- Rhu and Shandon
- Rosneath and Clynder
- Sandbank
- Seil and Easdale
- Southend
- South Cowal
- South Knapdale
- Strachur and District
- Tarbert and Skipness
- Taynuilt
- Tiree
- West Kintyre
- West Lochfyne

== Settlements ==
The largest settlements in Argyll and Bute.

Largest settlements by population:

Settlement	Population (2020)
Helensburgh	13,230
Oban	8,140
Dunoon	7,660
Campbeltown	4,500
Rothesay	4,310
Garelochhead	3,650
Lochgilphead	2,280
Cardross	2,070
Rhu	1,930
Sandbank	1,320
Kilcreggan	1,280

- Achahoish; Airdeny; Appin; Ardbeg (Islay); Ardbeg (Bute); Arden; Ardfern; Aldochlay; Ardlui; Ardmay; Ardgartan; Ardpeaton; Ardrishaig; Arduaine; Arrochar; Ardentinny; Ardnadam
- Barcaldine; Bellochantuy; Benderloch; Blairglas; Blairmore; Bonawe; Bowmore; Bridge of Orchy
- Cairndow; Cardross; Carradale; Clachan; Cairnbaan; Campbeltown; Clachan of Glendaruel; Cladich; Clynder; Colgrain; Colintraive; Connel; Coulport; Cove; Coylet; Craigendoran; Craighouse; Craignure; Craobh Haven; Crarae; Crinan; Clachaig; Carrick Castle;
- Dunoon; Dalavich; Dalmally; Druimdrishaig; Drumlemble; Duchlage; Dunbeg;
- Edentaggart;
- Faslane Port; Ford; Furnace;
- Glenbranter; Garelochhead; Geilston; Glenbarr; Glencoe; Glenmallan; Grogport;
- Helensburgh; Hunters Quay;
- Innellan; Inveraray; Inverbeg; Inveruglas Isle; Inverchaolain
- Kames; Keillmore; Kilberry; Kilchattan Bay; Kilchenzie; Kilcreggan; Kilmadan; Kilmartin; Kilmore; Kilmun; Kilninver; Kilmelford; Kilfinan; Kirn;
- Lagavulin; Lochawe; Lochgair; Lochgilphead; Lochgoilhead; Luss;
- Machrihanish; Millhouse; Minard; Muasdale;
- Oban; Ormsary; Otter Ferry;
- Peninver; Portavadie; Port Askaig; Port Bannatyne; Port Charlotte; Port Ellen; Portincaple; Portnahaven; Portkil;
- Rahane; Rhu; Rosneath; Rothesay;
- Saddell; Salen; Sandbank; Scalasaig; Shandon; Skipness; Southend; Stewarton; Strachur; Succoth; Strone; St Catherines;
- Tarbert (Kintyre); Tarbet (Lomond); Tayinloan; Taynuilt; Tayvallich; Tighnabruaich; Tobermory; Torinturk; Toward;
- Whistlefield; Whitehouse;

== Places of interest ==
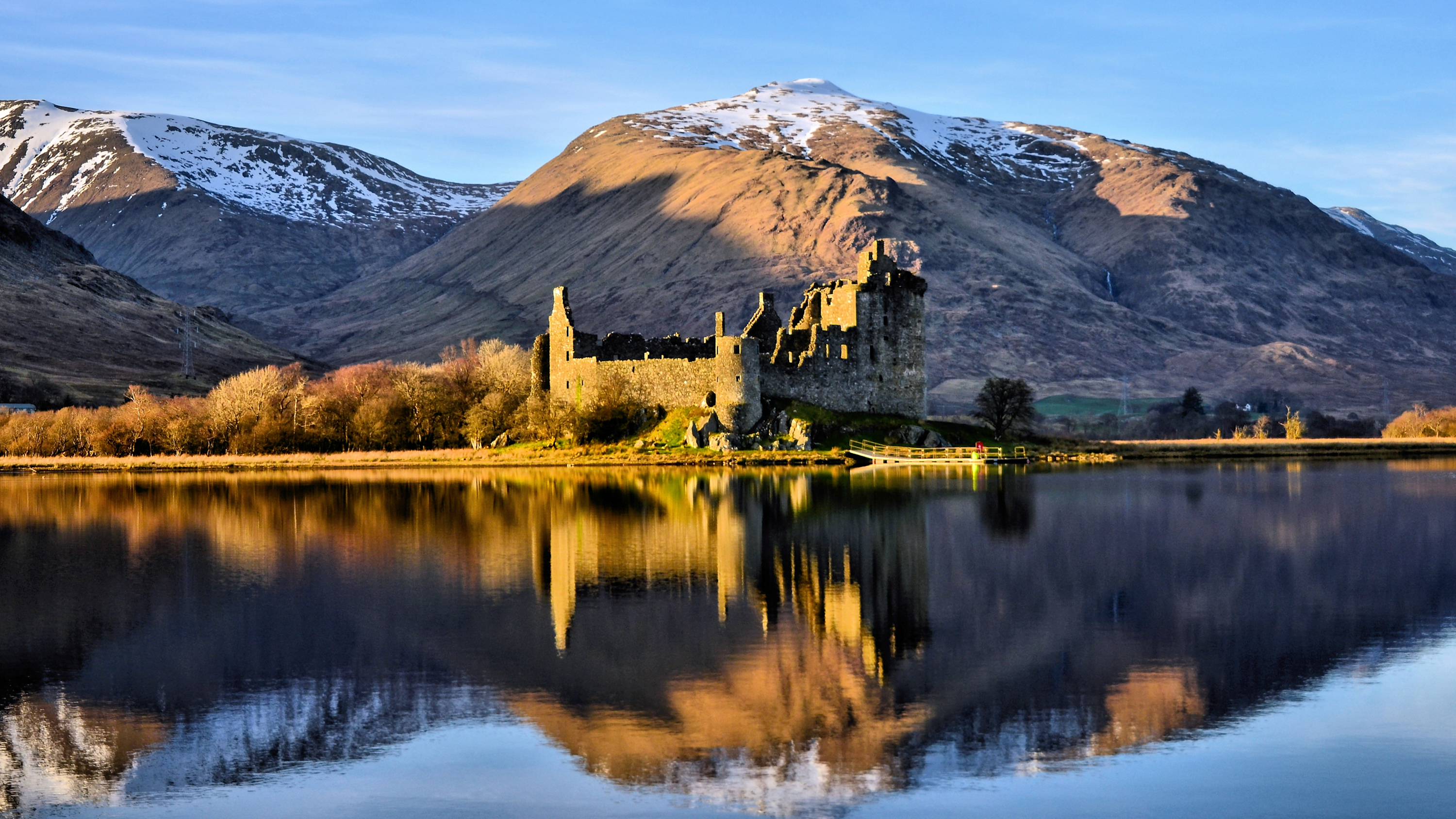
Kilchurn Castle reflected on Loch Awe

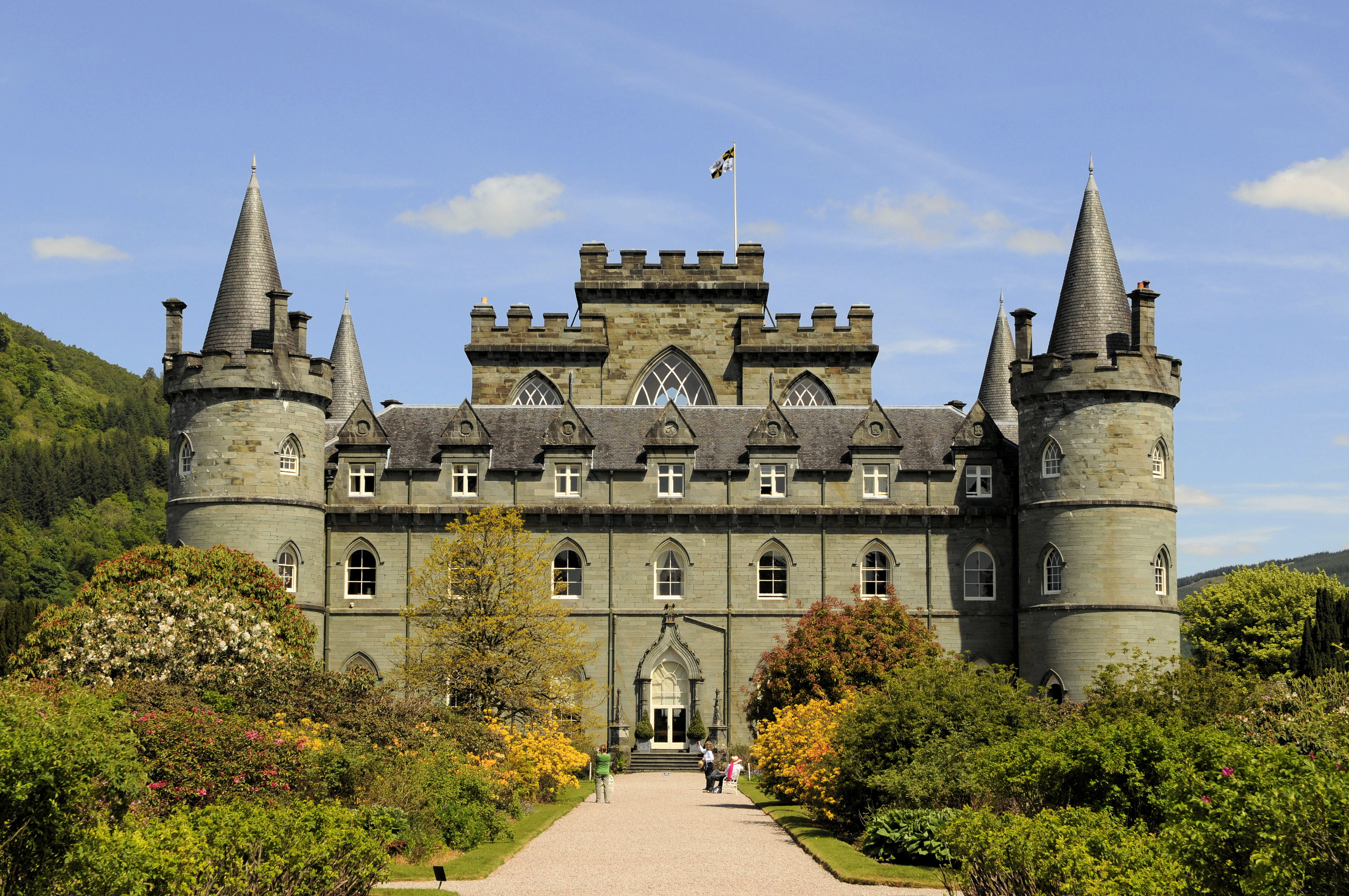
Inveraray Castle, Argyll and Bute, Scotland

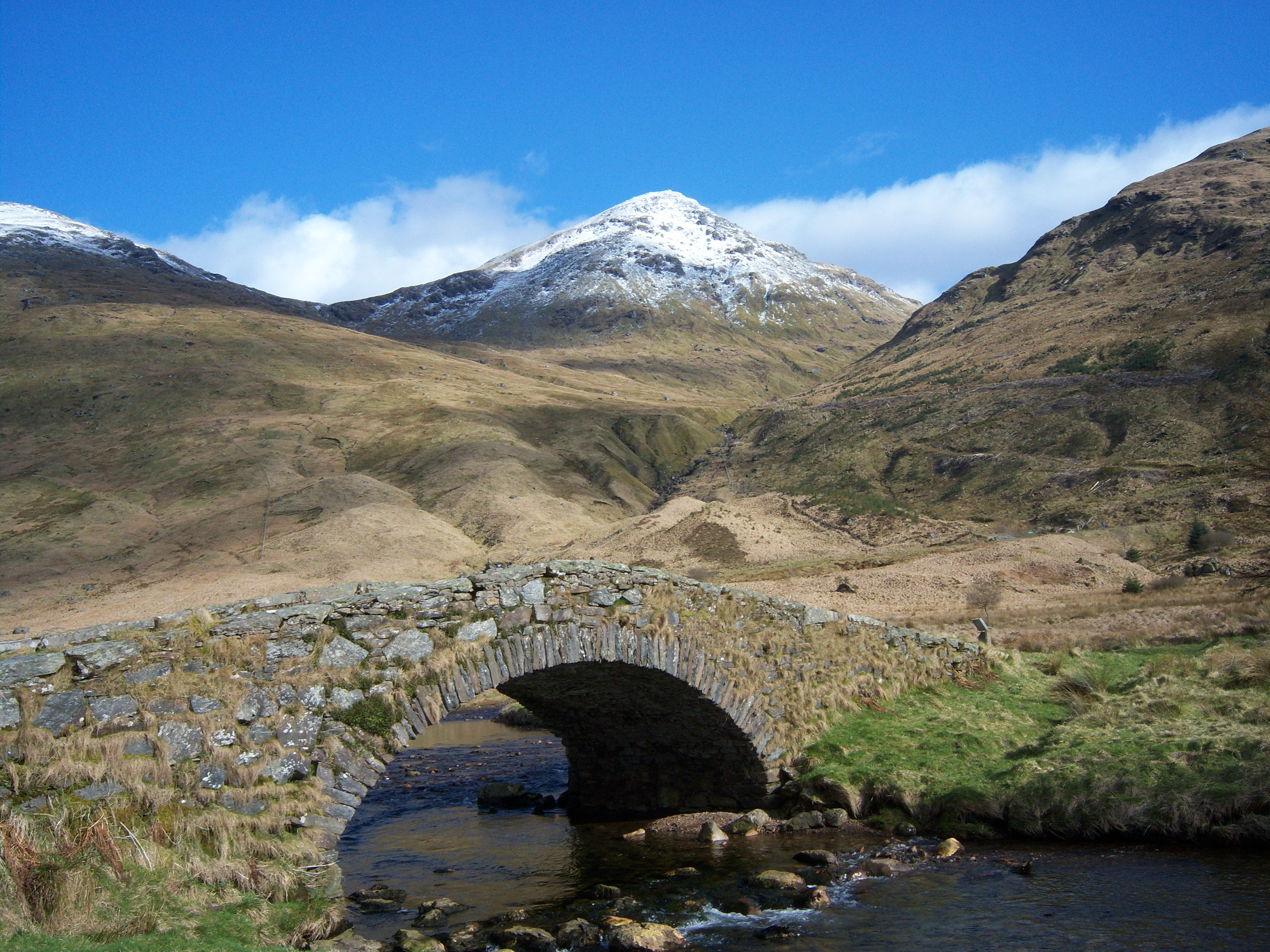
Beinn Ìme from the butterbridge

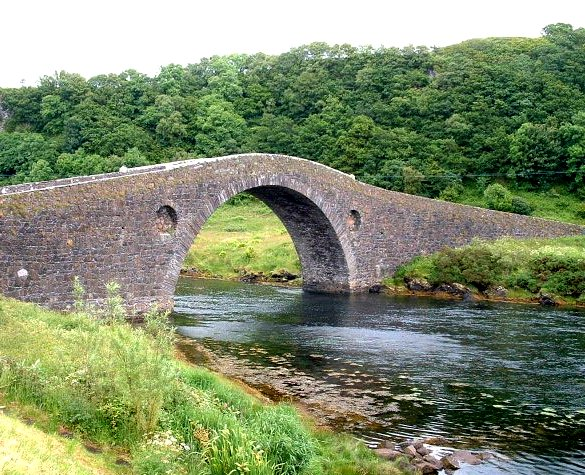
Clachan Bridge

- Ardbeg distillery
- Ardencraig Gardens (Isle of Bute)
- Arduaine Garden
- Argyll Forest Park (Including Loch Eck)
- Arrochar Alps (Including Beinn Ìme)
- Auchindrain Township Open Air Museum
- Avinagillan standing stone
- Beinn Dorain
- Ben Cruachan (Highest mountain in Argyll and Bute)
- Ballochroy (Standing stones)
- Ben Donich
- Benmore Botanic Garden
- Bridge over the Atlantic (Clachan Bridge)
- Crarae Garden
- Carnasserie Castle, Kilmartin
- Carrick Castle
- Castle Stalker
- Castle Sween
- Crinan Canal
- Cruachan Power Station (Pumped storage)
- Dunadd (Capital of the ancient kingdom of Dál Riata)
- Dun Na Cuaiche, Tower (Inveraray)
- Dunollie Castle
- Dun Skeig (Iron Age forts)
- Dunstaffnage Castle
- Dunstaffnage Chapel
- Easdale Island (Former slate quarry)
- Falls of Lora, Loch Etive
- Fincharn Castle
- Fingal's Cave (Staffa)
- Gare Loch and Faslane Naval Base
- Glen Croe (Rest and be thankful)
- Glen Scotia distillery (Campbelltown)
- Gulf of Corryvreckan
- Gylen Castle
- Hill House, Helensburgh
- Inveraray Castle (Clan Campbell main residence)
- Inveraray Jail
- Iona Abbey
- Isle Of Bute Distillery
- Jura distillery
- Kilchurn Castle
- Kilmartin Glen (Including Kilmartin Stones)
- Kilmodan Carved Stones
- Kyles of Bute
- Lagavulin distillery
- Laphroaig distillery
- Loch Goil
- Loch Lomond and Cowal Way
- Loch Lomond and the Trossachs National Park
- Melfort
- McCaig's Tower, Oban
- Mount Stuart House, Isle of Bute
- Mull of Kintyre
- Oban distillery
- Old Castle Lachlan
- Puck's Glen
- Rannoch Moor
- River Orchy
- Rothesay Castle
- Rothesay's Victorian Toilets
- Saddell Abbey
- Saddell Castle
- Skipness Castle
- Springbank Distillery, Campbelltown
- St Blane's Chapel (Isle of Bute)
- St Columba's Cathedral, Oban
- St Conan's Kirk, Loch Awe
- Tarbert Castle
- West Highland Line
- West Highland Way

== Islands ==
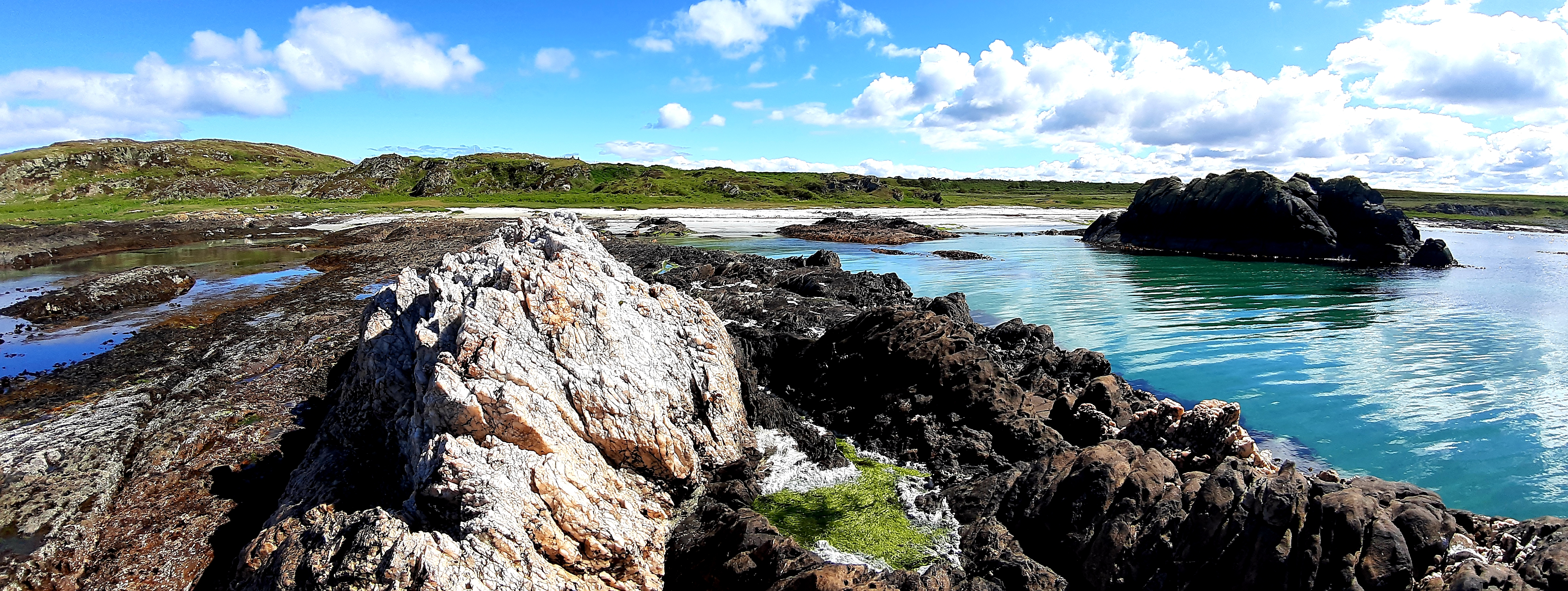
Grob Bagh Beach, Isle of Gigha - geograph.org.uk - 6164907

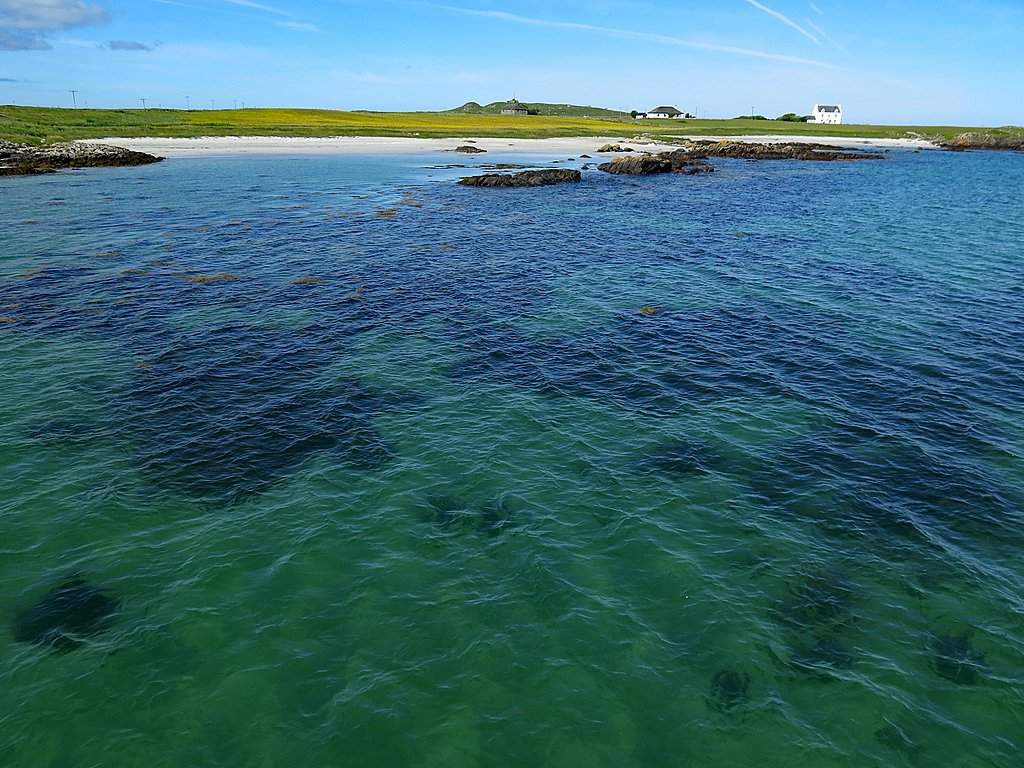
Tiree from ferry pier - geograph.org.uk - 5465755

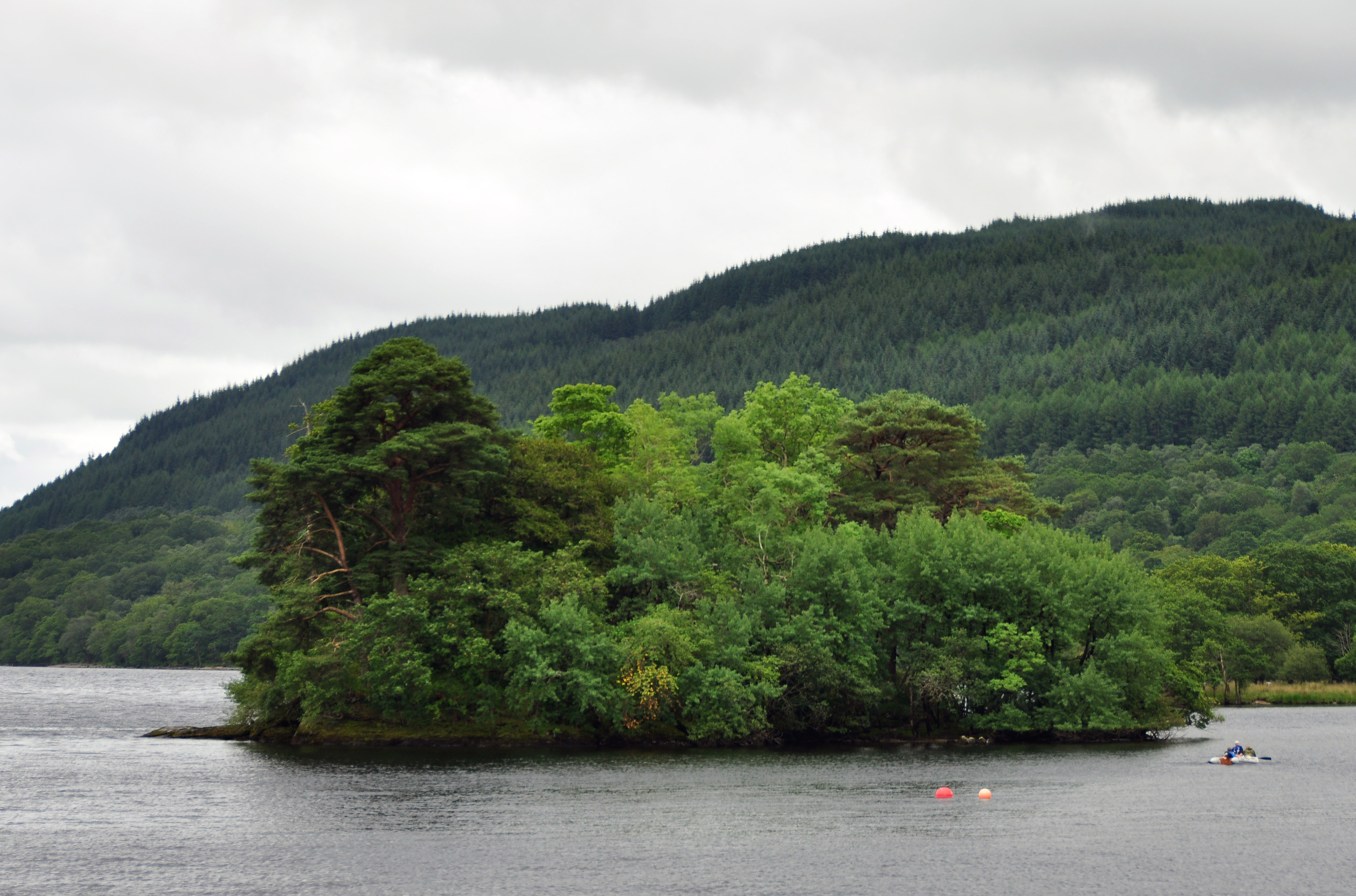
Inveruglas Isle

- Am Fraoch Eilean, Sound of Jura
- Bernera (Tidal island)
- Bute, Firth of Clyde
- Burnt Islands, located in the Kyles of Bute
- Calve Island
- Cara
- Coll
- Colonsay
- Creag
- Danna (Tidal island)
- Davaar, Campbeltown Loch
- Eilean dà Mhèinn, Loch Crinan
- Eilean Dubh Mòr, Firth of Lorn
- Eilean Loain
- Eorsa west of Mull
- Eriska
- Erraid (Tidal island) west of Mull
- Fraoch Eilean, Loch Awe
- Garvellachs Islands including Garbh Eileach; Dùn Chonnuill and Eileach an Naoimh.
- Gigalum
- Gigha
- Glunimore
- Gometra
- Gunna (lies between Coll and Tiree)
- Holy Isle, off Arran
- Inchconnachan, Loch Lomond
- Inchgalbraith, Loch Lomond
- Inch Kenneth off Mull
- Inchlonaig, Loch Lomond
- Inchmarnock, Sound of Bute
- Inchmoan Loch Lomond
- Inchtavannach, Loch Lomond
- Innis Chonain, Loch Awe
- Inishail (alternate Inchald), Loch Awe
- Inveruglas Isle, Loch Lomond
- Iona
- Islay
- Jura
- Kerrera
- MacCormaig Isles including Carraig an Daimh; Corr Eilean; Eilean Ghamhna; Liath Eilean; Eilean Mòr; Sgeir Bun an Locha; Sgeir Dhonncha and Dubh Sgeir.
- Maiden
- Lismore
- Little Colonsay west of Mull
- Mull
- Oronsay (Tidal island)
- Orsay west of Islay
- Pladda, south of Arran
- Ross Isles Loch Lomond
- Sanda off Kintyre
- Scarba
- Sheep Island
- Shuna, near Appin
- Slate Islands including Easdale, Fladda, Seil, Luing, Lunga, Shuna, Torsa and Belnahua.
- Skerryvore
- Staffa
- Tarbet Isle, Loch Lomond
- Texa (South of Islay)
- Tiree
- Treshnish Islands including Lunga, Fladda
- Ulva (West of Mull)
- Wallace's Isle Loch Lomond

== See also ==
- List of places in Argyll and Bute
