= Ardbeg =

Ardbeg may refer to:

- Ardbeg, Bute, a settlement on the island of Bute in Scotland
- Ardbeg, Islay, a small settlement on the island of Islay off the west coast of Scotland
  - Ardbeg distillery, or its product, a Scotch whisky distillery in Ardbeg
- Ardbeg, Ontario, a community in Whitestone, Ontario, Canada

== See also ==
- Arbegas
