= Inchtavannach =

Island in Scotland

Innis Taigh a' Mhanaich (Gaelic)

Location
- Location within Argyll and Bute
- OS grid reference: NS365915
- Coordinates: 56.08°N 4.63°W

Name
- Name meaning: island of the monk's house

Physical geography
- Island group: Loch Lomond
- Area: 70 ha
- Area rank: 174= (Freshwater: 4)
- Highest elevation: Tom na Clag 84 m

Administration
- Council area: Argyll and Bute
- Country: Scotland
- Sovereign state: United Kingdom

Demographics
- Population: 3
- Population rank: 85= (Freshwater: 2=)

Inchtavannach (Scottish Gaelic: Innis Taigh a' Mhanaich; English: Island of the Monk's House), is one of the larger islands in Loch Lomond.

== Geography ==
Inchtavannach faces the settlement of Aldochlay. Bandry Bay separates the island from the mainland, just south of Luss. According to Rev. Wilson, the island is "comparatively steep and lofty, mostly covered with natural oak". A northern summit, Tom nan Clag (English: Mound of the Bell), rises steeply to 282 feet (86 m), the highest point on the loch. A southern summit reaches 180 feet (55 m) in height.

== History ==
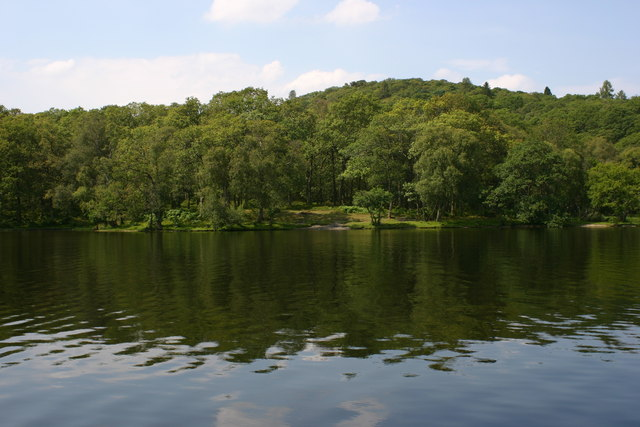
Bay on Inchtavannach

It was once the site of a monastery, giving rise to its translated name of 'Monk's Isle'. A large house has stood on the site of the monastery since 1760. The island is predominantly wooded. It is here that the monks rang the bell to the call of prayer.

Roe Deer are recorded to have lived here. Sir James Colquhoun built a winding path up to the summit in the 17th century.

The poets Samuel Taylor Coleridge and William Wordsworth, together with Wordsworth's sister Dorothy, visited in August 1803.

The producer of Take the High Road Brian Mahoney lived in a house on the island for ten years.
