= Creag Island =

Island in Scotland

Coordinates: 56°29′N 5°31′W

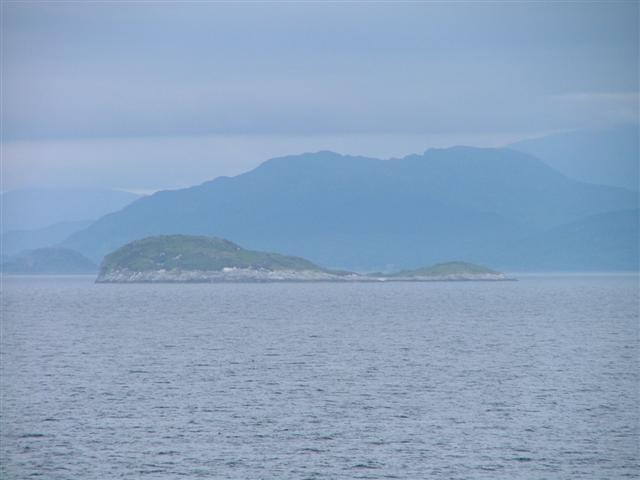

Location
- Creag Island shown within Argyll and Bute

Administration
- Council area: Argyll and Bute
- Country: Scotland
- Sovereign state: United Kingdom

Creag Island is an island in Scotland. It is located in Argyll and Bute council area, in the northwestern part of the country, 600 km northwest of the British capital London.
