= Glenmallan =

Village in Scotland

Coordinates: 56°07′34″N 4°48′54″W

HMS Queen Elizabeth berthed at Glenmallan

Glenmallan is a settlement in Argyll and Bute, Scotland, on the shore of Loch Long. It has a population of under 1000, and its coordinates are latitude 56° 07' 34" N, longitude 4° 48' 54" W.

The jetty at Glenmallan was upgraded in 2019 and it is able to take the Royal Navy's largest aircraft carriers, the Queen Elizabeth-class.
