= Ross Isles =

Islands in Scotland

Coordinates: 56°7′19″N 4°37′51″W

The Ross Isles are two small islands in Loch Lomond, in west central Scotland.

They lie opposite Luss, and are named after the promontory on the east shore (ros meaning the same in Scottish Gaelic), where Ross Priory is located.

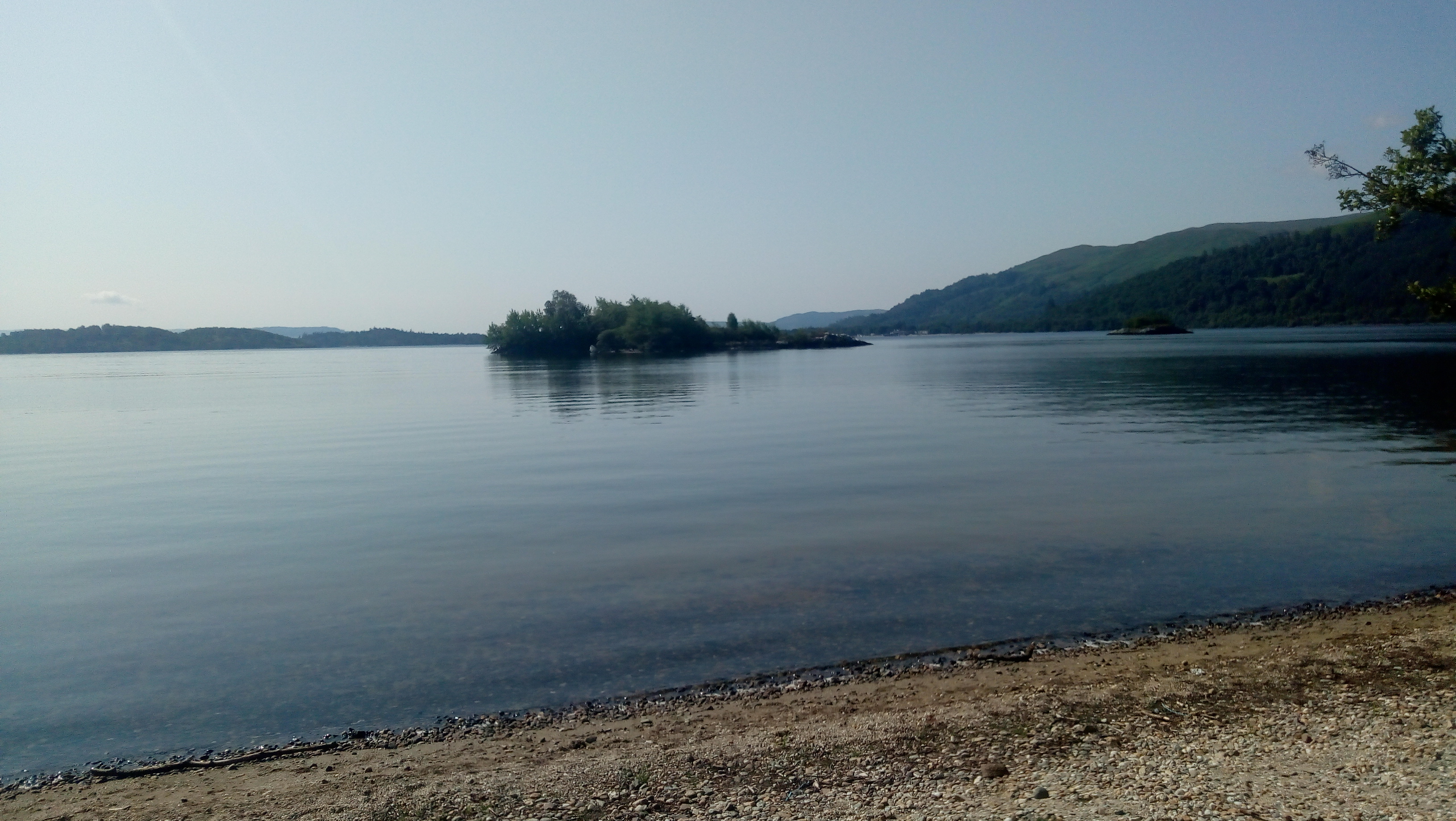
The Ross Isles as seen from a beach on Ross Point, to the north.

The Pilot sank off here in 1850.

The islands have some vegetation but are mostly uninhabitable, with the smaller island having no suitable landing location for boats to approach. The larger island to the east has a small gravel beach on the north east side, which provides a landing for small boats

== External links and references ==
- https://web.archive.org/web/20090710015304/http://lochlomond-islands.com/
