= Druimdrishaig =

Scottish hamlet

Coordinates: 55.876417°N 5.627940°W

Druimdrishaig is a hamlet in Argyll and Bute, Scotland, on the shore of Loch Caolisport.
