= Kilchenzie =

Village in Kintyre, Argyll and Bute, Scotland

Coordinates: 55°27′46″N 5°40′52″W

- Location within Argyll and Bute
- OS grid reference: NR675248
- Council area: Argyll and Bute
- Lieutenancy area: Argyll and Bute
- Country: Scotland
- Sovereign state: United Kingdom
- Post town: CAMPBELTOWN
- Postcode district: PA28
- Police: Scotland
- Fire: Scottish
- Ambulance: Scottish
- UK Parliament: Argyll, Bute and South Lochaber
- Scottish Parliament: Argyll and Bute

Kilchenzie is a small farming community situated 5 miles (8 km) northwest of Campbeltown on the Kintyre peninsula in Argyll, Scotland. It is reached from north and south by the A83 road. In 1961 it had a population of 69.
