= Glenbarr =

Coordinates: 55°33′58″N 5°42′14″W

Glenbarr: Scottish Gaelic: Am Bàrr
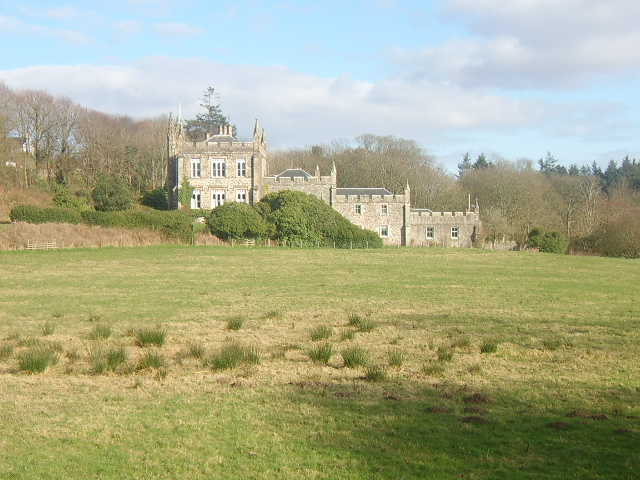
- Glenbarr Abbey

- Location within Argyll and Bute
- OS grid reference: NR670366
- Council area: Argyll and Bute
- Lieutenancy area: Argyll and Bute
- Country: Scotland
- Sovereign state: United Kingdom
- Post town: TARBERT
- Postcode district: PA29
- Police: Scotland
- Fire: Scottish
- Ambulance: Scottish
- UK Parliament: Argyll, Bute and South Lochaber
- Scottish Parliament: Argyll and Bute

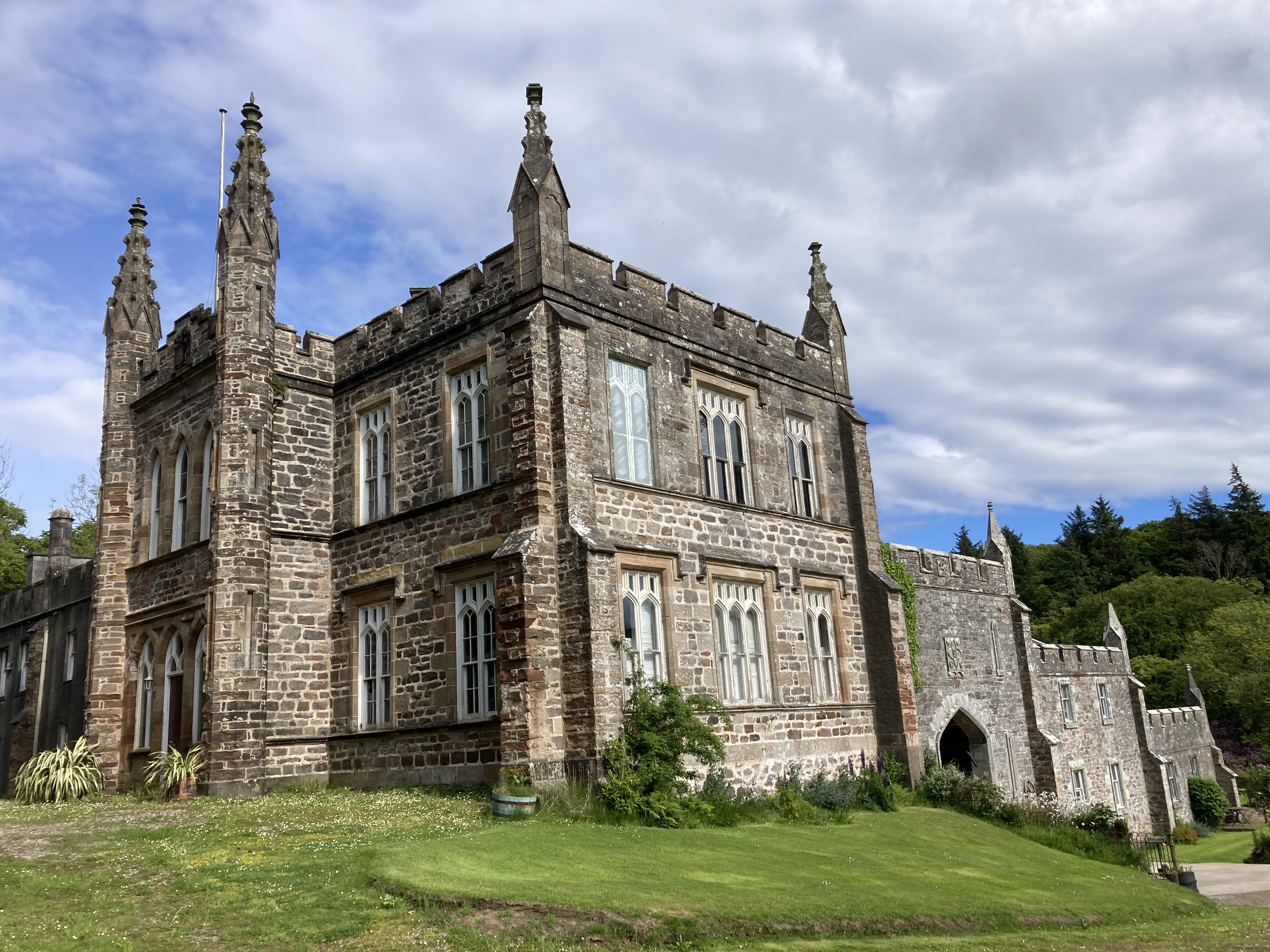
Glenbarr Abbey as it appeared on 31 May 2022 photo courtesy of Bob Weenig

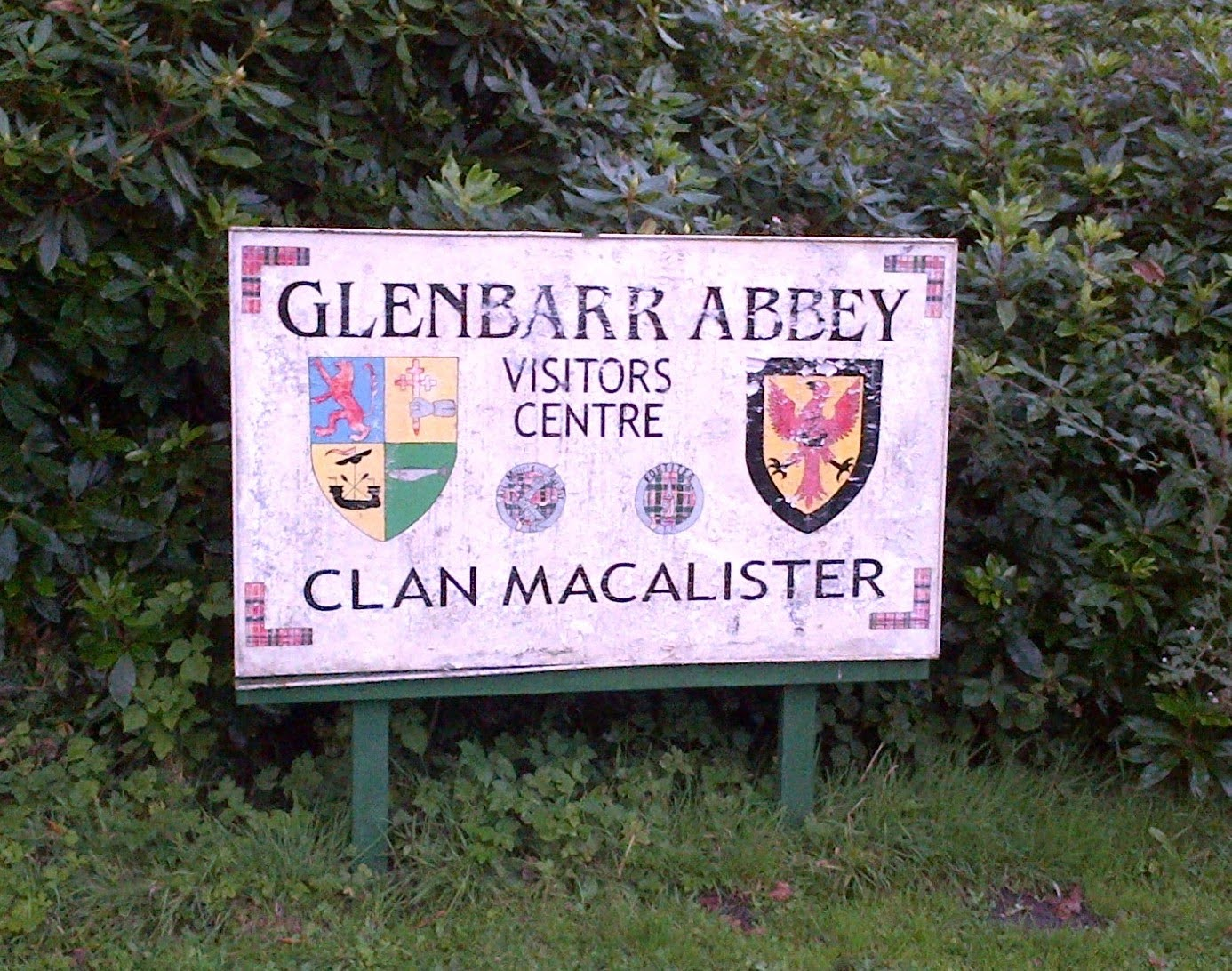
Entrance sign to Glenbarr Abbey which is no longer present. Photo made 9 October 2013

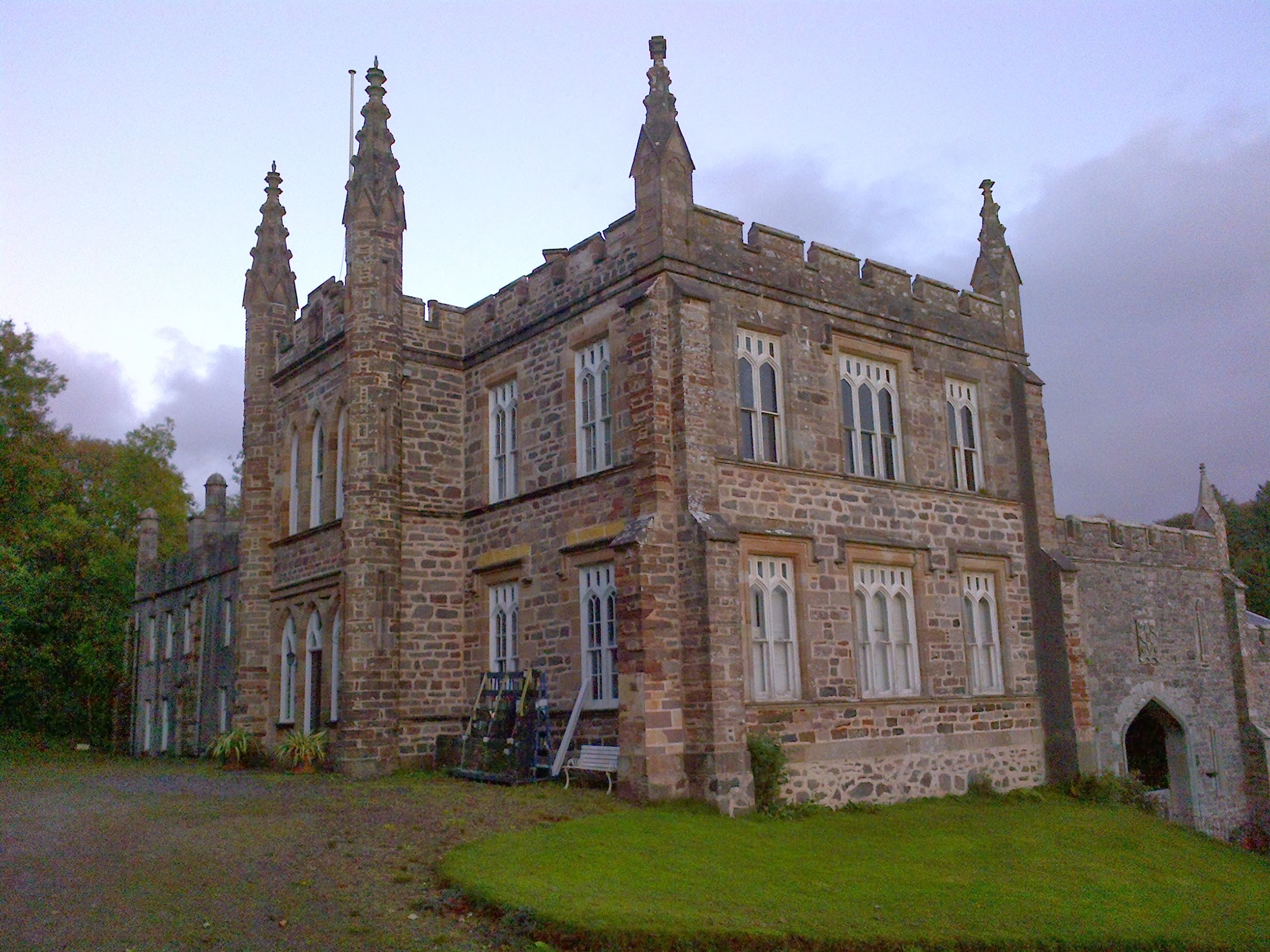
Glenbarr Abbey in 2013 courtesy of Bob Weenig

Glenbarr (Scottish Gaelic: Am Bàrr, pronounced [əm ˈpaːrˠ]) is a village in Argyll and Bute, Scotland. It lies on the west coast of the Kintyre peninsula.

== Glenbarr Abbey ==
Nearby is Glenbarr Abbey, an 18th-century residence, purchased by Col. Matthew Macalister, 1st Laird of Glenbarr. Today it serves as a visitor centre for the history of Clan MacAlister.
