= St Catherines, Argyll =

Coordinates: 56.221076°N 5.0305179°W

St Catherines: Scottish Gaelic: Cill Chaitrìona
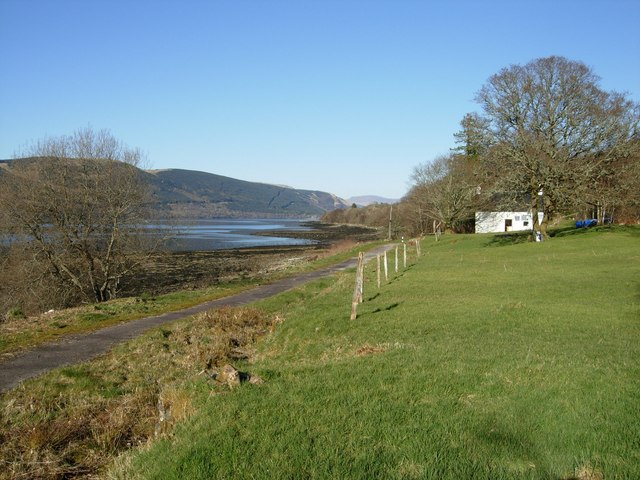
- Loch Fyne Cottage at southwestern boundary of village beside disused loch road

- Location within Argyll and Bute
- OS grid reference: NN 12200 07300
- Council area: Argyll and Bute
- Lieutenancy area: Argyll and Bute
- Country: Scotland
- Sovereign state: United Kingdom
- Post town: CAIRNDOW
- Postcode district: PA25
- Dialling code: 01499
- UK Parliament: Argyll, Bute and South Lochaber
- Scottish Parliament: Argyll and Bute

St Catherines (Scottish Gaelic: Cill Chaitrìona) is a village in Argyll and Bute, Scotland. It is located on the banks of Loch Fyne, opposite Inveraray and is served by the A815 road.

The old Ferry Inn in St. Catherines is on the Buildings at Risk Register of Scotland.

The remains of St Catherine's Chapel and Burial Ground. Now only foundations remain of the chapel.

== Gallery ==
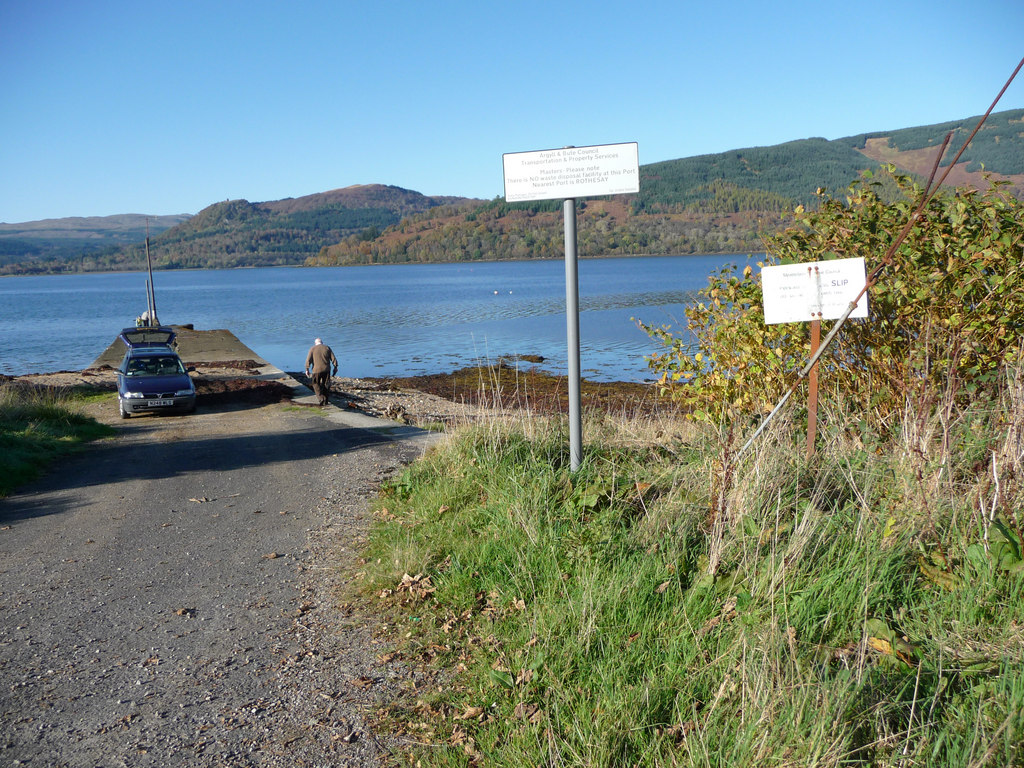
Jetty and slipway

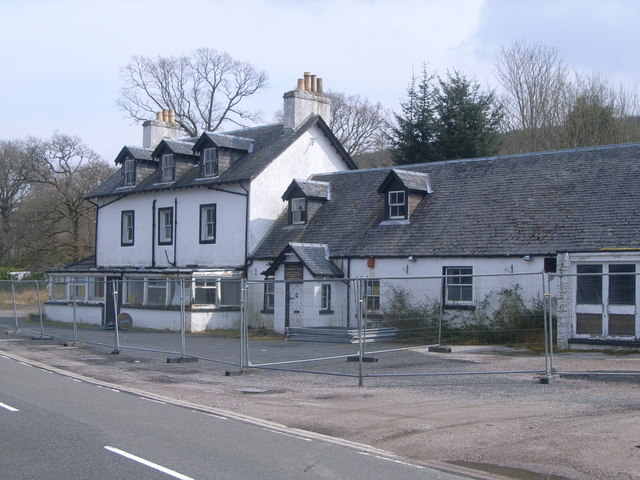
The Old Ferry Inn in 2008
