= Rahane =

Village in Argyll and Bute, Scotland

- Village
- Location in Scotland
- Coordinates: 56°02′52″N 4°50′03″W
- Country: Scotland
- Council area: Argyll and Bute
- Historic county: Argyll
- Time zone: UTC+0 (GMT)

Rahane is a clachan (small village) in Argyll and Bute, Scotland, on the west bank of the Gare Loch in the Rosneath peninsula, 2.3 miles (3.7 km) south of the larger settlement of Garelochhead and 11 miles (18 km) northwest by road from the town of Helensburgh.

The area contains much Forestry Commission managed stock.
