= Bellochantuy =

Coastal hamlet in Argyll and Bute, Scotland

Coordinates: 55°31′44″N 5°42′18″W

Bellochantuy: Scottish Gaelic: Bealach an t-Suidhe
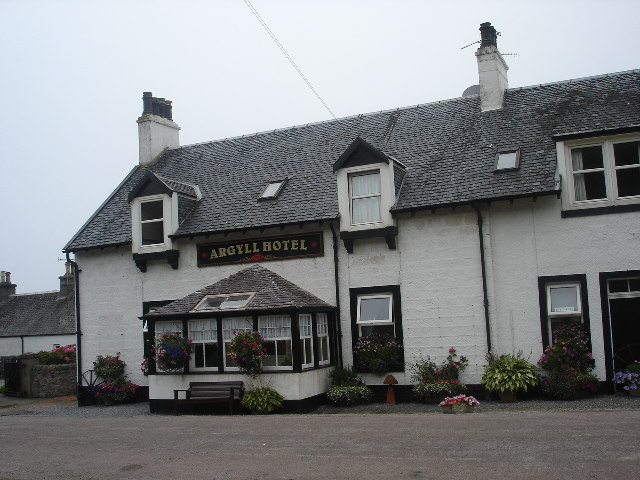
- Argyll Hotel, Bellochantuy

- Location within Argyll and Bute
- OS grid reference: NR664326
- Council area: Argyll and Bute
- Lieutenancy area: Argyll and Bute
- Country: Scotland
- Sovereign state: United Kingdom
- Post town: CAMPBELTOWN
- Postcode district: PA28
- Police: Scotland
- Fire: Scottish
- Ambulance: Scottish
- UK Parliament: Argyll, Bute and South Lochaber
- Scottish Parliament: Argyll and Bute

Bellochantuy (/ˈbɛloʊxænti/; Scottish Gaelic: Bealach an t-Suidhe, pronounced [ˈpjal̪ˠəx ən̪ˠ ˈt̪ʰɯjə]) is a small coastal hamlet located on the A83 in Argyll and Bute, west of Scotland, on the Kintyre Peninsula, around 10 miles (16 km) north of Campbeltown, Scotland.

Argyll Hotel Bellochantuy became the first mainland building in Britain damaged by enemy action when strafed by a German aircraft.

== Etymology ==
The origin of the place name Bellochantuy is Bealach an t-Suidhe, Scottish Gaelic for "the pass of the seat". Local folk etymology alleges the meaning of "fairy grove".
