= Cladich =

Village in Argyll and Bute, Scotland, UK

Coordinates: 56.35286°N 5.08145°W

Cladich (Scottish Gaelic: An Cladach) is a scattered settlement in Argyll, Scotland.

Cladich lies on the B840 road just to the west of its junction with the main A819.
