= Lagavulin =

Coordinates: 55.636°N 6.127°W

Lagavulin: Scottish Gaelic: Lag a' Mhuilinn
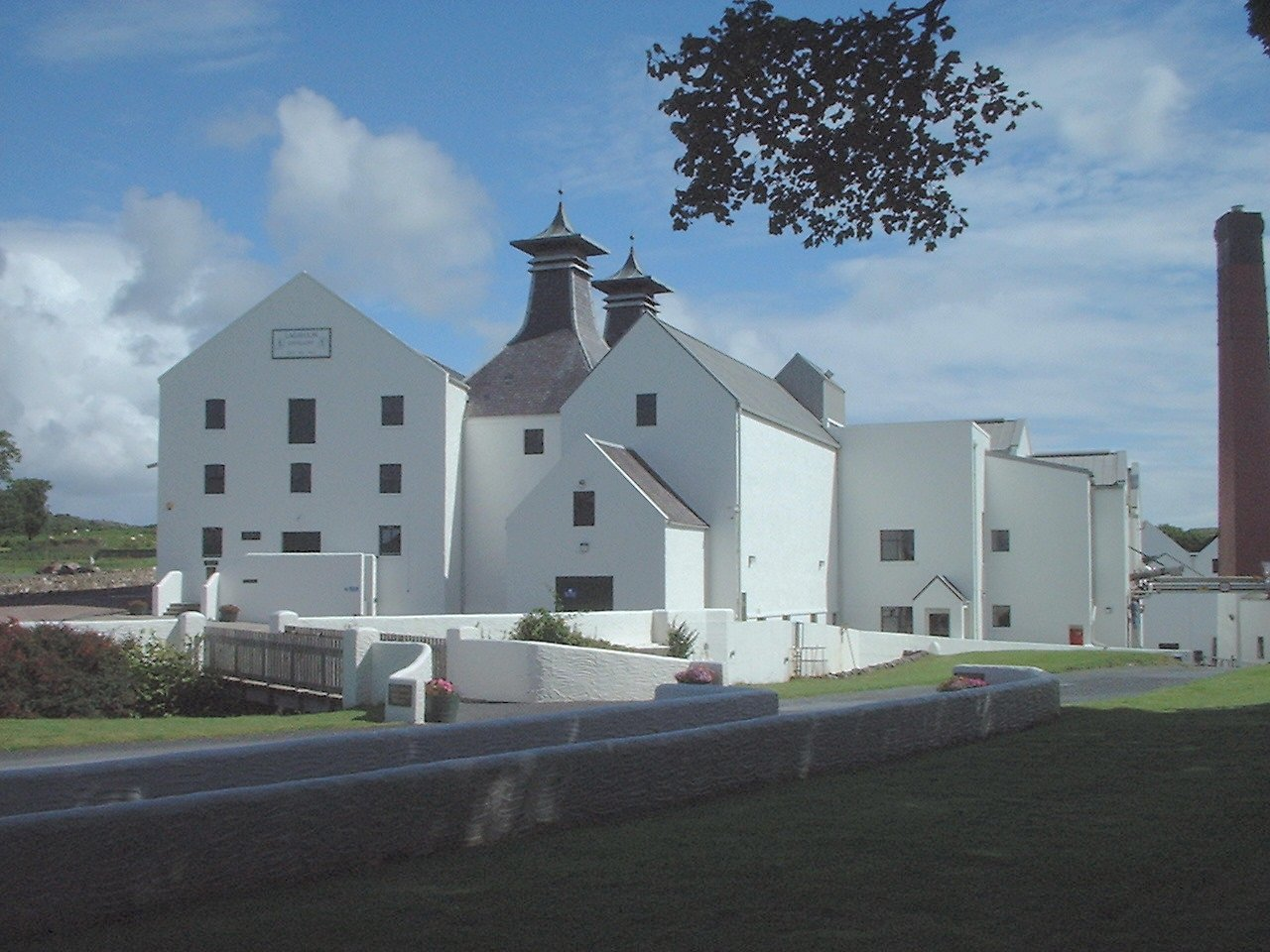
- The entrance to the Lagavulin distillery

- Location within Argyll and Bute
- OS grid reference: NR404457
- Civil parish: Kildalton
- Council area: Argyll and Bute
- Lieutenancy area: Argyll and Bute
- Country: Scotland
- Sovereign state: United Kingdom
- Post town: ISLE OF ISLAY
- Postcode district: PA42
- Dialling code: 01496
- Police: Scotland
- Fire: Scottish
- Ambulance: Scottish
- UK Parliament: Argyll, Bute and South Lochaber
- Scottish Parliament: Argyll and Bute

Lagavulin (Scottish Gaelic: Lag a' Mhuilinn, "hollow of the mill") is a small village approximately 3 miles (5 kilometres) outside Port Ellen on the Isle of Islay, Scotland. The village is within the parish of Kildalton, and is situated on the A846 road.

It is best known for being the home of Lagavulin single malt whisky.
