= Whitehouse, Argyll =

Coordinates: 55°47′50″N 5°29′11″W

Whitehouse: Scottish Gaelic: An Taigh Bàn
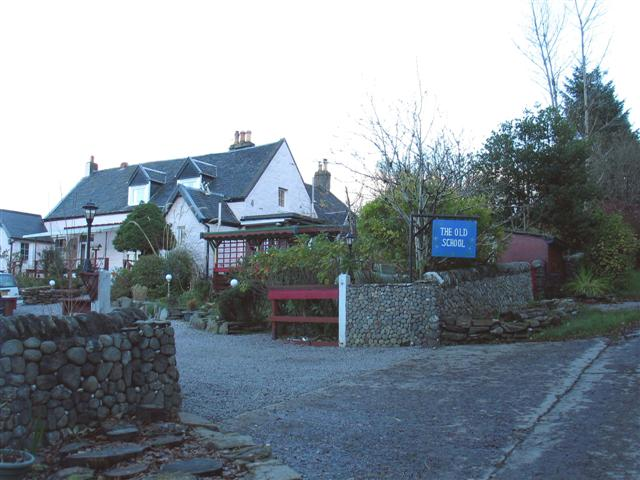
- The Old School at Whitehouse, now a private residence

- Location within Argyll and Bute
- OS grid reference: NR 81565 61494
- Council area: Argyll and Bute
- Lieutenancy area: Argyll and Bute
- Country: Scotland
- Sovereign state: United Kingdom
- Post town: TARBERT
- Postcode district: PA29
- Police: Scotland
- Fire: Scottish
- Ambulance: Scottish
- UK Parliament: Argyll, Bute and South Lochaber
- Scottish Parliament: Argyll and Bute

Whitehouse (Scottish Gaelic: An Taigh Bàn, pronounced [ən̪ˠ t̪ʰɤj ˈpaːn]) is a hamlet on the Kintyre Peninsula in Argyll and Bute, west of Scotland. It is located around 5.5 miles (9 km) southwest of Tarbert and around 25 miles (40 km) north of Campbeltown.
