= Coulport (village) =

Village in Argyll and Bute, Scotland

Coordinates: 56°02′43″N 4°52′11″W

Coulport: Scottish Gaelic: An Cùl Phort
- Location within Argyll and Bute
- OS grid reference: NS213871
- Council area: Argyll and Bute
- Lieutenancy area: Dunbartonshire
- Country: Scotland
- Sovereign state: United Kingdom
- Post town: HELENSBURGH
- Postcode district: G84
- Police: Scotland
- Fire: Scottish
- Ambulance: Scottish
- UK Parliament: Argyll, Bute and South Lochaber
- Scottish Parliament: Dumbarton

Coulport (Scottish Gaelic: An Cùl Phort - literally the Back Port or Ferry) is a village on the east side of Loch Long and the west side of the Rosneath Peninsula, in Argyll and Bute, west of Scotland.

It is 5 miles (8 km) north-north-west of Cove. It marks the end of the B833 shore road, although the village can also be reached by a high-quality but unclassified access road (primarily designed for naval traffic) directly from Garelochhead. The village looks across to the small settlement of Ardentinny on the west shore to which, in the 18th/19th century, there was a ferry.

John Kibble, the son of a Glasgow metal merchant, was one of several wealthy Glasgow merchants who had large villas built at Coulport in the nineteenth century either as permanent residences or summer retreats. Several still survive, some now flatted, others in a dilapidated condition. Kibble's Coulport House was the original location of the giant conservatory known as the Kibble Palace (now in Glasgow's Botanic Garden).

Since the 1960s Coulport has been most associated with the Trident missile storage and the nearby Royal Naval Armaments Depot (RNAD Coulport) situated there as part of HMNB Clyde.
