= Peninver =

Coordinates: 55.467°N 5.548°W

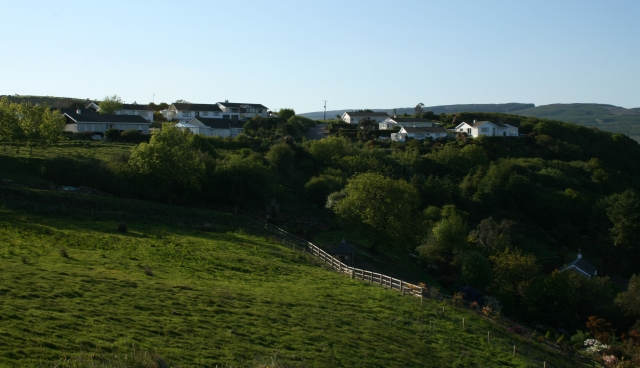
- Houses above Peninver

- Location within Argyll and Bute
- OS grid reference: NR759249
- Council area: Argyll and Bute
- Lieutenancy area: Argyll and Bute
- Country: Scotland
- Sovereign state: United Kingdom
- Post town: CAMPBELTOWN
- Postcode district: PA28
- Police: Scotland
- Fire: Scottish
- Ambulance: Scottish
- UK Parliament: Argyll, Bute and South Lochaber
- Scottish Parliament: Argyll and Bute

Peninver (pronounced "Pe-NEE-ver") is a small village situated on the east coast of Kintyre, Scotland. It lies 4.5 miles (7 kilometres) north of Campbeltown, the principal town in the area. The village is located on Ardnacross Bay, with an outlook over the bay to the Isle of Arran.
