= Arden, Argyll =

Village in Argyll and Bute, Scotland

Coordinates: 56.02°N 04.63°W

Arden
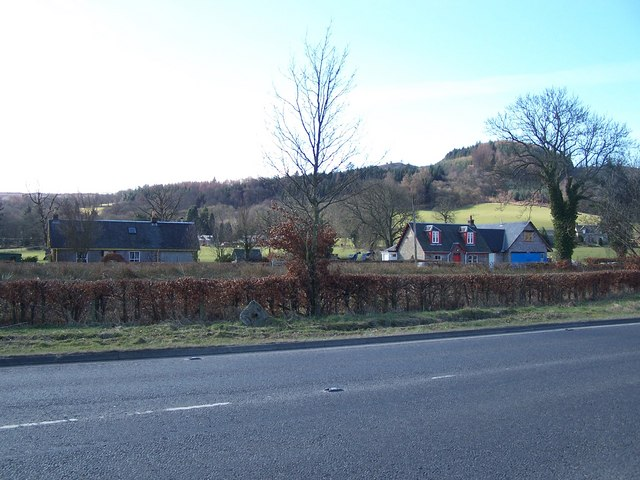
- Houses at Arden

- Location within Argyll and Bute
- OS grid reference: NS3684
- Council area: Argyll and Bute
- Country: Scotland
- Sovereign state: United Kingdom
- Post town: Alexandria
- Postcode district: G83
- Dialling code: 01389
- Police: Scotland
- Fire: Scottish
- Ambulance: Scottish
- UK Parliament: Argyll, Bute and South Lochaber
- Scottish Parliament: Dumbarton

Arden is a village on the southwest shore of Loch Lomond in Argyll and Bute, Scotland.
