= Aldochlay =

Village in Argyll and Bute, Scotland

Coordinates: 56.087°N 4.637°W

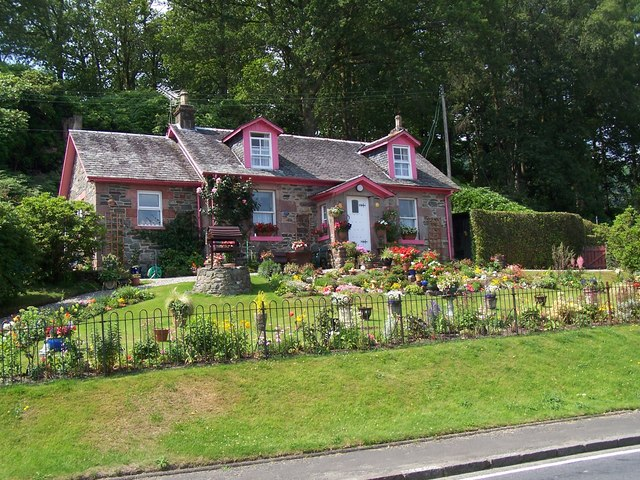
- Rowanbank Cottage at Aldochlay, 2006

- Location within Argyll and Bute
- OS grid reference: NS360913
- Council area: Argyll and Bute
- Lieutenancy area: Dunbartonshire
- Country: Scotland
- Sovereign state: United Kingdom
- Post town: Alexandria
- Postcode district: G83
- Police: Scotland
- Fire: Scottish
- Ambulance: Scottish
- UK Parliament: Argyll, Bute and South Lochaber
- Scottish Parliament: Dumbarton

Aldochlay is a small hamlet in Argyll and Bute, Scotland, on the shore of Loch Lomond opposite the island of Inchtavannach and just south of Luss. It was formerly part of Dunbartonshire, but is now part of Argyll and Bute. The hamlet has no speed limit sign, due to it being a quiet hamlet.

It is known to many people for the small statue of a boy on a plinth in the loch.
