= Edentaggart =

Coordinates: 56.109336°N 4.696345°W

Edentaggart is a settlement of a few houses in Argyll and Bute, Scotland, located near the town of Alexandria.

The area is made up of sheep farms and rolling hills.

== Notable people ==
- Hannah Rankin – professional boxer
