= West Pier Public Convenience =

Toilet

Coordinates: 55°50′19″N 5°3′16″W

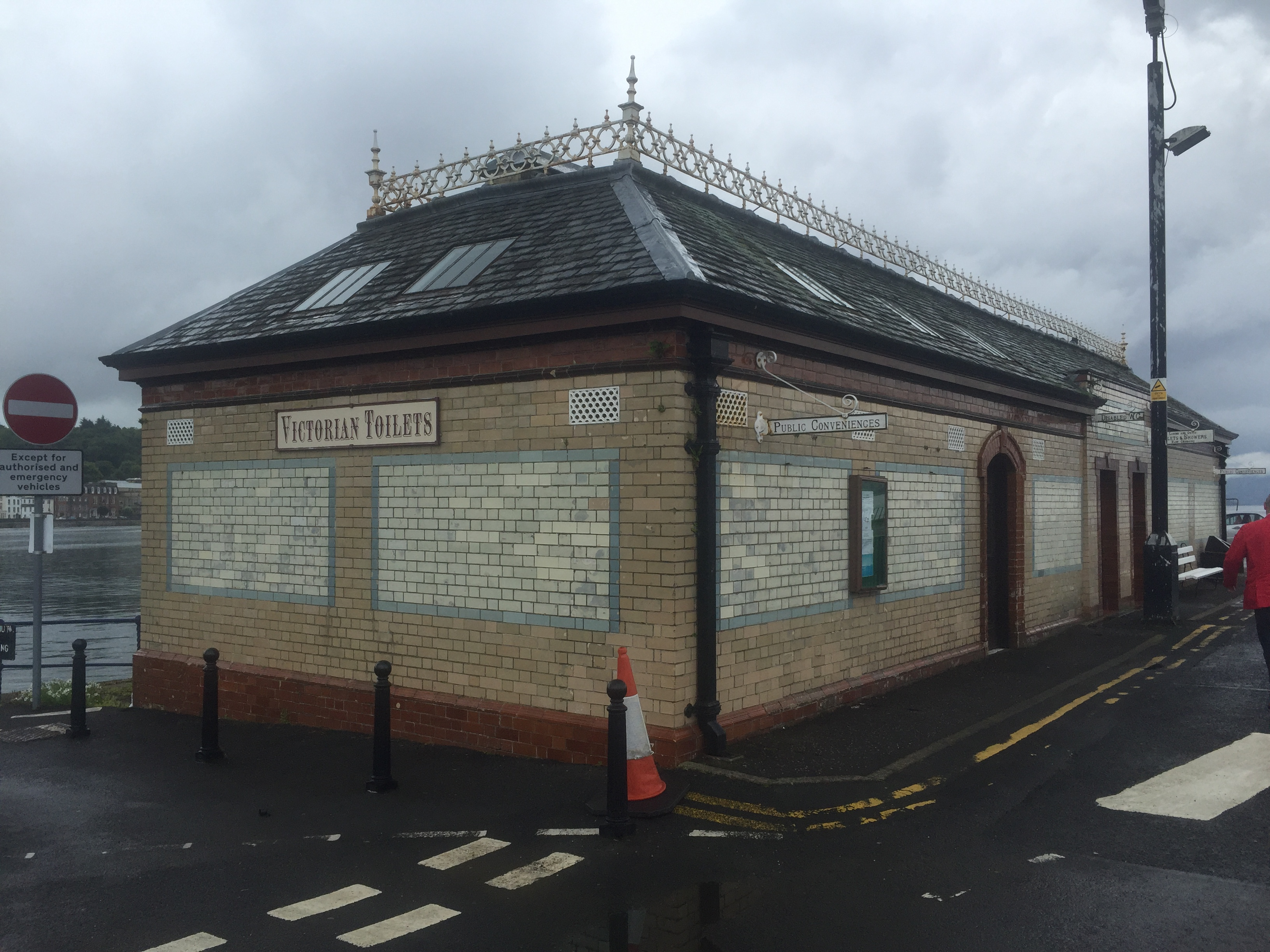

The West Pier Public Convenience or Victorian Toilets is a public toilet on the west pier of the harbour of Rothesay on the Isle of Bute. It opened in 1900, replacing previous cast-iron facilities, and was renovated in 1994. It is now a tourist attraction and listed for statutory protection.

== Construction ==
The toilet was commissioned in 1899 by the Rothesay Harbour Trustees to replace cruder facilities made from cast iron. At that time, Rothesay was a major seaside resort, being located in the Firth of Clyde and so conveniently accessible by steamer from the major conurbation of Glasgow. Steaming was especially significant on Sundays when the sale of alcohol was banned except on the paddle-steamers and so men would go to drink on them. To cater for the bustling crowds of day-trippers and holiday-makers, the toilets were well made with ornate fittings which were mostly supplied by Twyfords at a cost of £530. There were 20 urinals fed by copper pipes from four cisterns and nine cubicles with lavatory pans.

== Renovation ==
The toilets were renovated in 1994 at a cost of about £300,000, which was financed by the Strathclyde Building Preservation Trust. An adjacent storeroom and office were converted to provide facilities for ladies, a disabled toilet and a shower. They are now maintained by a charity, Bute Victoriana. Further work was done in 2016 to make the toilets available around the clock.

== Reception ==
After the renovation, the toilets were reopened by Lady Lucinda Lambton who is an expert on architectural history and has published books on the history of the lavatory. She praised the toilets as "the most beautiful in the world".

The building's listing category was upgraded from B to A as part of a Rothesay listing review in 2010–11. The historic toilets are now a tourist attraction. The Rough Guide to Scotland described them as "...a feast of marble, ceramics and brass so ornate that they are now one of the town's most celebrated sights".

Prince Charles was the Duke of Rothesay and has visited the toilets. The urinal which he patronised is marked with his coat of arms, by royal appointment. There is a visitors' book for other patrons.

== Gallery ==
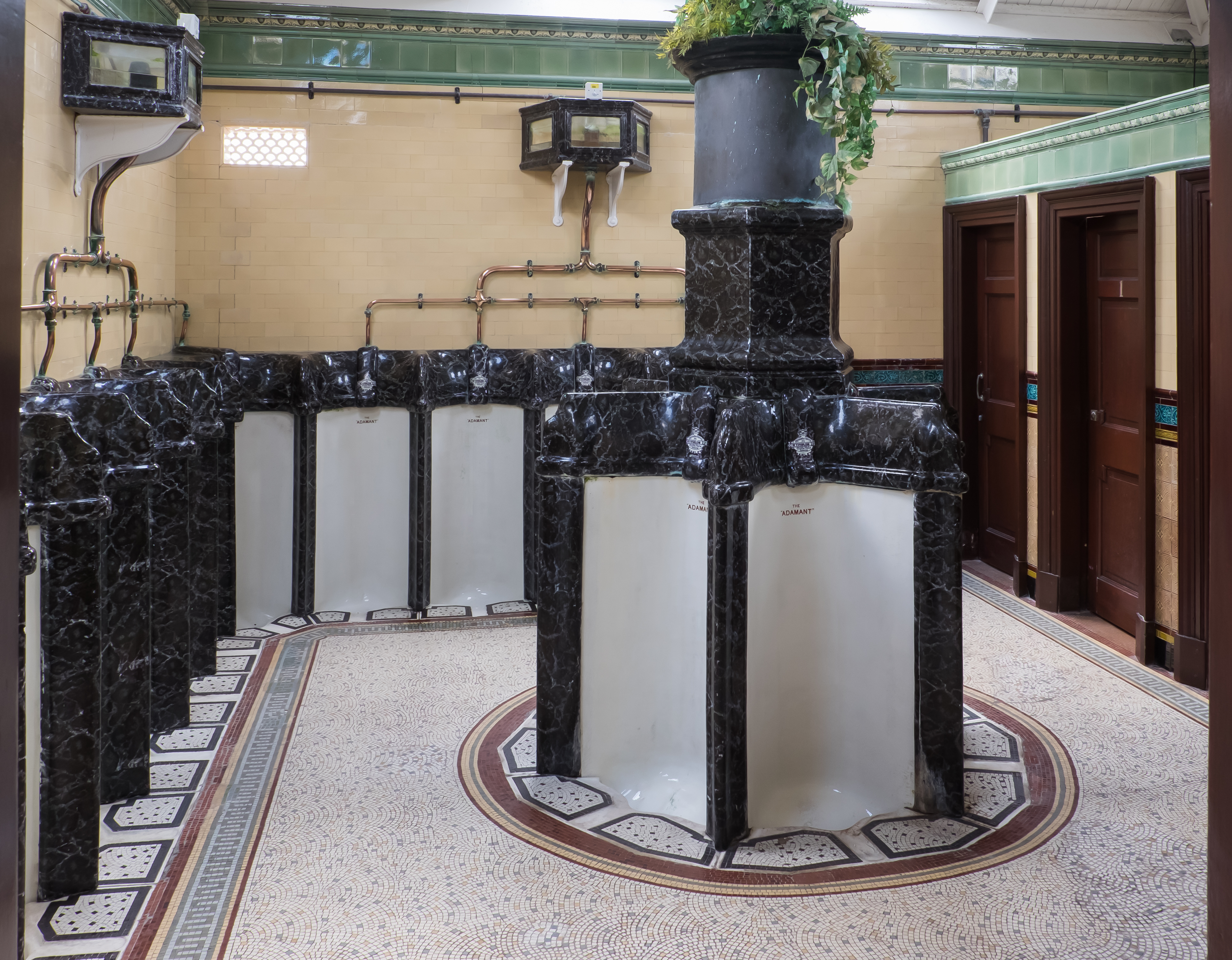
Men's urinals

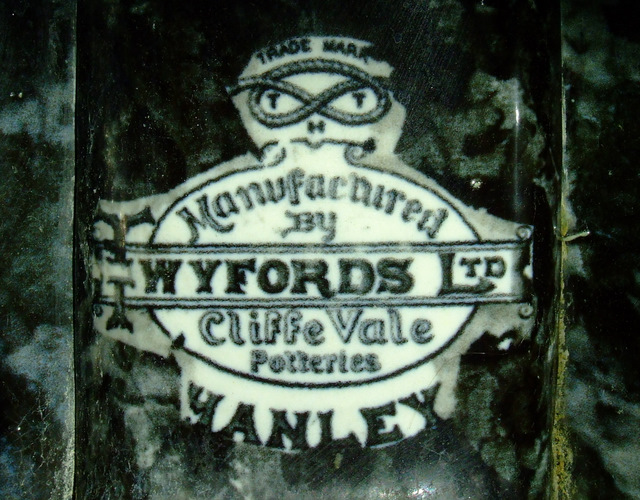
Twyfords label

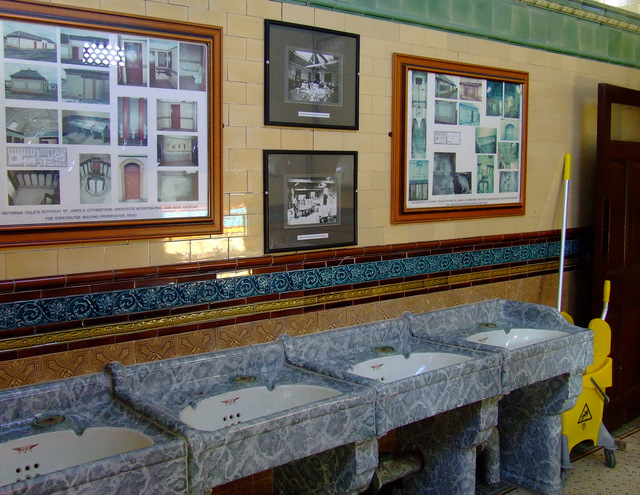
Wash basins

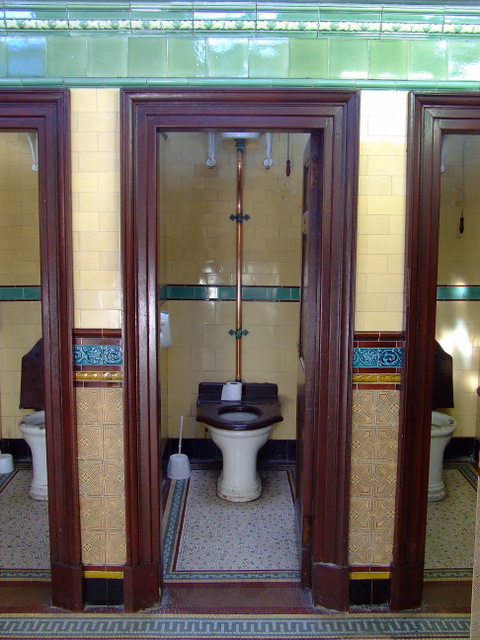
Water closet
