= Portkil =

Coordinates: 55°59′06″N 4°47′54″W

Portkil is a village on the north shore of the Firth of Clyde in Argyll and Bute, Scotland, and is at the south end of the Rosneath Peninsula.
