= Clynder =

Place in Argyll and Bute, Scotland

Coordinates: 56°01′N 4°49′W

Clynder is a small, picturesque village on the western shore of the Gare Loch, Argyll and Bute, Scotland, c. 20 minutes drive from Helensburgh. Clynder is one of a string of small settlements on the Rosneath Peninsula, bordered by Loch Long and the Gareloch. It is almost directly opposite the village of Shandon with views down the Gareloch toward Helensburgh and up toward Garelochhead and the Arrochar Alps.

The hills immediately behind Clynder were formerly used as apiaries, the types of heather found there being particularly attractive to bees.
