= Succoth, Argyll =

Village in Scotland

Coordinates: 56.2114°N 4.7507°W

Succoth: Scottish Gaelic: An Socach
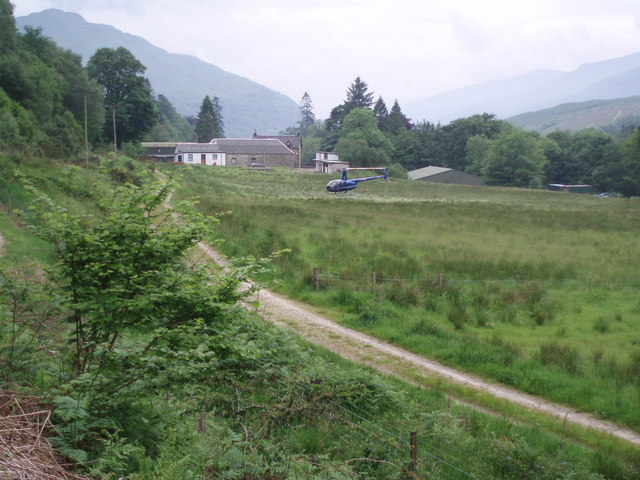
- Helicopter training at Stronafyne, north of Succoth.

- Location within Argyll and Bute
- OS grid reference: NN295055
- Council area: Argyll and Bute
- Lieutenancy area: Argyll and Bute
- Country: Scotland
- Sovereign state: United Kingdom
- Post town: ARROCHAR
- Postcode district: G83
- Dialling code: 01301
- UK Parliament: Argyll, Bute and South Lochaber
- Scottish Parliament: Argyll and Bute

Succoth (Scottish Gaelic: An Socach and sometimes referred to as Succoff or Succot in Scots) is a village in Argyll and Bute, Scotland.
