= Ardmay =

Coordinates: 56.186184°N 4.769274°W

Ardmay is an area in Argyll and Bute, Scotland, on the shore of Loch Long, noted for its large house.
