= Inverbeg =

Village in Argyll and Bute, Scotland

Coordinates: 56.145°N 4.664°W

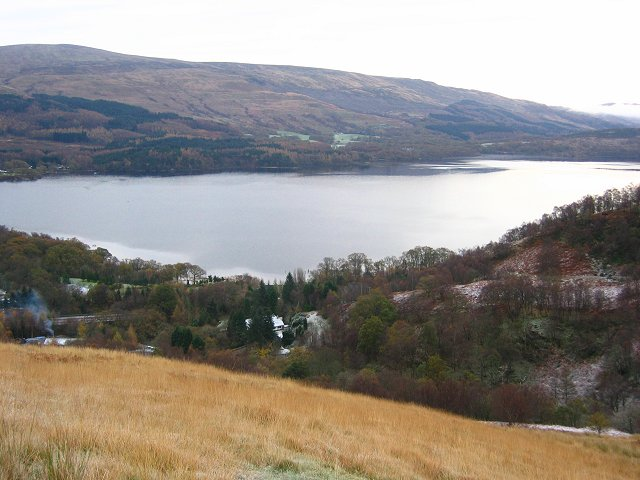

- Location within Argyll and Bute
- OS grid reference: NS3497
- Council area: Argyll and Bute
- Country: Scotland
- Sovereign state: United Kingdom
- Post town: ALEXANDRIA
- Postcode district: G83
- UK Parliament: Argyll, Bute and South Lochaber
- Scottish Parliament: Dumbarton

Inverbeg is a settlement in Argyll and Bute, Scotland. Its Ordnance Survey grid reference is NS3497.

It is on the western shore of Loch Lomond. There has at times been a pedestrian ferry to Rowardennan on the opposite side of the loch. It is at the foot of Glen Douglas.
