= Muasdale =

Coordinates: 55°36′00″N 5°41′05″W

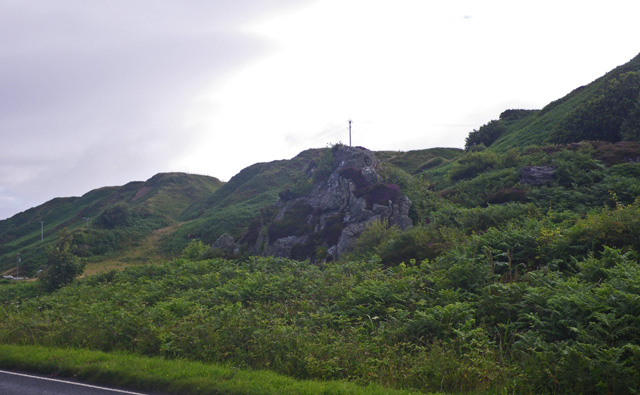
Vegetation covered rock outcrops at the northern edge of Muasdale

Muasdale (Scottish Gaelic: Muasdal) is a hamlet on the western coast of the Kintyre Peninsula of Scotland. As of the year 2000 Muasdale had a population of 300. By the year 1750 the Roy map showed a coastal track along the west coast of Kintyre, even though the population level of the entire southern peninsula was very low.

== See also ==
- Campbeltown
