= Ardbeg, Bute =

Coordinates: 55.85355°N 5.06096°W

Ardbeg is a small settlement on the island of Bute in Scotland, in Argyll and Bute (grid reference NS0866). It is on the south side of Port Bannatyne. It developed largely in the 19th century as part of Rothesay's tourist boom.
