= Fincharn Castle =

Coordinates: 56°11′10.21″N 5°23′17″W

- Loch Awe
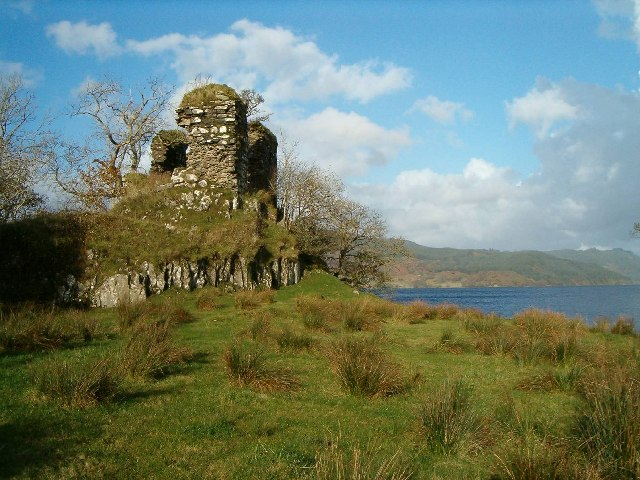
- The castle ruins in 2005

Site history
- Built: probably about 1240

Scheduled monument
- Official name: Fincharn Castle
- Type: Secular: castle; hall
- Designated: 30 March 1992
- Reference no.: SM5276

Fincharn Castle, also known as Fionchairn Castle and Glassery Castle, is a ruined castle near Ford on the southwest shore of Loch Awe, Scotland.

== History ==
The castle was probably built in about 1240, the year the lands of Fincharn were granted to Giolla Easbaig Mac Giolla Chríost by Alexander II, King of Scotland.

The castle seems to be identical one mentioned in correspondence between Alasdair Óg Mac Domhnaill and Edward I, King of England in 1297. According to this correspondence, Alasdair Óg seized control of the barony and castle of "Glasrog" from the Steward of Scotland on account of the steward's disloyalty to the English king.

The castle may have been one of the three mentioned in correspondence between Eóin Mac Dubhghaill and Edward I in 1308 or 1309. According to this correspondence, Eóin garrisoned these castle on behalf of the English king.

It is a scheduled monument.
