= Achanduin Castle =

- Achnacroish, Lismore, Argyll and Bute, Scotland.
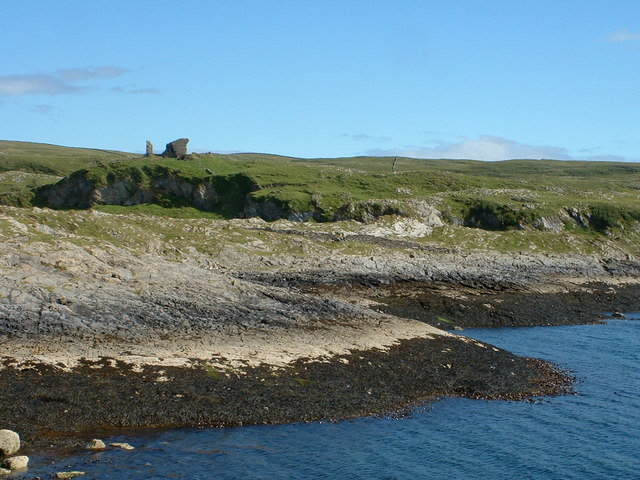
- Achanduin Castle, 2005.

Site information
- Controlled by: Clan MacDougall c.1290 - c.1400. Bishop of Argyll 14? - c.1550.
- Condition: in ruins.

Location
- Coordinates: 56°29′40″N 5°34′8″W

Site history
- Built: c.1290.
- Built by: MacDougal family.
- In use: not in use.

Garrison information
- Past commanders: Eugenil de Ergadia c.1304.

Scheduled monument
- Official name: Achadun Castle
- Type: Secular: castle
- Designated: 16 April 1964
- Reference no.: SM2411

Achanduin Castle, (also known as Achadun Castle and Acha-Dun), is a castle, now in ruins, located about 5.0 kilometres (3.1 mi) west of Achnacroish on the north-western coastline of the island of Lismore, in Argyll and Bute, Scotland. The castle overlooks Loch Linnhe and Bernera Island. The ruins are thought to date back to the thirteenth century. Achanduin Castle had long been thought to have been built by the Bishop of Argyll, though recent research has proved this to be unlikely. The castle was likely built by the MacDougalls around 1290 who held it throughout the fourteenth century. The castle was also thought to have been held by the Bishops of Argyll until the mid sixteenth century. It is a scheduled monument.

== Description of the ruins ==
The remains of the castle are seated on the summit of a limestone ridge on the north-western shore of Lismore. The south-west and south-east walls are collapsed though the north-east and a large part of the north-west wall still stand, to a maximum height of 6.7 metres. These curtain walls vary in thickness from 1.4 metres (4 ft 7 in) to 2.4 metres (7 ft 10 in) and enclose an area of about 22.0 metres (72.2 ft) metres square. The enclosed area would have contained at least two ranges of buildings on either side of a small courtyard, the south-east range being the more substantial. During excavations of the site in 1970 and 1971, two doorways were found leading from the courtyard into the north-west range.

== Archaeological excavations ==
The castle was excavated by Dennis Turner, over six seasons between 1970 and 1975. These excavations took place mostly in August of each year and lasted a few weeks. Turner died before he could complete the writing of the excavation report and it was completed by David H. Caldwell and Geoffrey P. Stell using his notes. They noted that the excavations took place at a time before modern archaeological techniques so the notes were not always the easiest to understand.

Caldwell and Stell note that Turner might have excavated a pre-castle structure. Also, that some pieces of worked stone of prehistoric type were found during the excavation, indicating that there may have been some prehistoric occupation on the hilltop.

== History ==
Throughout the thirteenth century the Diocese of Argyll and the see of Lismore were in virtual poverty. It had once been thought that the Bishop of Argyll was the builder of Achanduin Castle, though recent research shows that neither the see or the Bishop at any time were wealthy enough to construct a castle. Recent research has points to the MacDougalls.

Archaeological excavations show that Achanduin Castle was built about 1290, at a time when the Bishop of Argyll, Laurence de Ergadia, was himself possibly a MacDougall. The first documentary evidence of the castle appears in a grant of lands dated 1304 at Achichendone, when Eugenil de Ergadia, Lord of Lorn, of Menderaloch and of Lesmor granted to Andrew, Bishop of Argyll lands next to the castle. This grant shows that Achanduin Castle was in the hands of a MacDougall at that time.

The MacDougalls were forfeit in 1308, and losing most of their lands following the Battle of the Pass of Brander and the loss of their stronghold of Dunstaffnage Castle. Of records concerning their redistributed possessions, Lismore is never mentioned. Therefore, it is possible that the MacDougalls were then allowed to retain the island. However, Lismore Isle was the dowry for Juliana MacDougall when she married Alexander MacDonald, who became Lord of the Isles in 1293. The MacDougalls, supported by John Balliol, then King of Scots, refused to turn Lismore over to Alexander MacDonald and in June 1292, he appealed to King Edward I who encouraged such appeals. King Edward agreed with the MacDonalds.

Archaeological evidence suggests that there was little occupation at the castle from c.1400 to relatively modern times. It appears to have been used as a farmstead from the 17th to the 19th centuries.

In 1451 John Maol (John Alani de Lorn nominato Mak Dowil) was granted Dunolly and other lands from John Stewart, Lord of Lorn. Around this time it is believed the MacDougalls left Lismore for the mainland to build Dunollie Castle. By 1452 The Bishop of Argyll seems to have had possession of Achanduin Castle and for a short time occupied it. It is suggested that the castle may have been given to the Bishopric at an earlier time, though there was not much use for it. The evidence shows at least that the Bishop of Argyll did not frequently visit Lismore.
