= Scheduled monuments in Argyll and Bute =

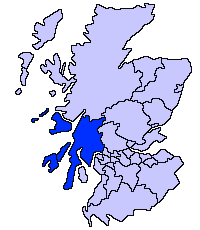
Argyll and Bute shown within Scotland

A scheduled monument in Scotland is a nationally important archaeological site or monument which is given legal protection by being placed on a list (or "schedule") maintained by Historic Environment Scotland. The aim of scheduling is to preserve the country's most significant sites and monuments as far as possible in the form in which they have been inherited.

The process of scheduling is governed by the Ancient Monuments and Archaeological Areas Act 1979, which aims "to make provision for the investigation, preservation and recording of matters of archaeological or historical interest". The term "scheduled monument" can apply to the whole range of archaeological sites which have been deliberately constructed by human activity but are not always visible above ground. They range from prehistoric standing stones and burial sites, through Roman remains and medieval structures such as castles and monasteries, to later structures such as industrial sites and buildings constructed for the World Wars. Some buildings or structures which were both scheduled and listed have had their listing designations removed to reduce the duplication.

As of 2017 there were 8,238 scheduled monuments in Scotland.

== Notable scheduled monuments in Argyll and Bute ==
Name	Location	Description	Ref No	Image
Tirefour Broch	Achnacroish	Ancient round house	SM246	
Oronsay Priory and cross	Oronsay	Ruined Augustinian priory	SM287	
Lachlan Castle	Garbhallt, Cowal peninsular	Ruined 15th-century castle	SM292	
Dunollie Castle	Kilmore And Kilbride, near Oban	Small ruined castle	SM293	
Gylen Castle	Kerrera	16th-century tower house	SM294	
Cill Naoimh (Kilnave) Chapel and cross	Kilnave, Islay	Medieval chapel and Early Christian cross	SM2338	
Achadun Castle	Lismore	Ruined 13th-century castle of the bishops of Argyll	SM2411	
Castle Coeffin	Lismore	Ruined medieval castle	SM2433	
Carrick Castle	Lochgoilhead	14th-century tower house	SM2495	
Texa chapel	Texa	Ruined chapel	SM2815	
Nave Island chapel	Nave Island	Ruined chapel and burial ground	SM2816	
Dunaverty Castle	Southend	Traces of Clan Macdonald castle	SM3041	
Ranachan Hill Fort	Campbeltown	Prehistoric domestic and defensive fort	SM3064	
Airds Castle	Carradale	Traces of medieval castle	SM3177	
Saddell Abbey	Saddell	Remains of a Cistercian abbey	SM3645	
Ballymeanoch	Kilmartin Glen	Group of standing stones	SM4301	
Dunivaig Castle	Kildalton	Ruined 12th-century castle	SM4747	
Aros Castle	Salen, Mull	Remains of 13th-century hall-house and bailey	SM5064	
Moy Castle	Torosay, Isle of Mull	15th-century towerhouse	SM5139	
Kilnaughton chapel	Kildalton	Medieval chapel of Kilnaughton and carved stones	SM5266	
Fincharn Castle	Glassary	Remains of a medieval hall house	SM5276	
Kilmahew Castle	Cardross	Ruined 16th-century castle	SM5404	
Dunoon Castle	Dunoon	Traces of 13th-century castle	SM5450	
Riasg Buidhe	Colonsay	Remains of a 19th-century fishing settlement	SM5974	
Crinan Canal-Crinan to Cairnbaan	North Knapdale	Ship canal designed by John Rennie, opened 1809	SM6500	
Crinan Canal-Cairnbaan to Ardrishaig	South Knapdale	Ship Canal designed by John Rennie, opened 1809	SM6501	
Rothesay Castle	Rothesay, Bute	Remains of a castle, chapel and moat	SM12970	
Skipness Castle and Kilbrannan Chapel	Skipness	Remains of medieval Skipness Castle and Kilbrannan Chapel	SM13225	
Kildalton Church and High Cross	Kildalton	Medieval church and early Christian high cross	SM13236	
St Columba's Cave and Chapel	Knapdale	Natural cave and 13th century chapel	SM13367	
Castle Sween	Knapdale	12th century ruined castle	SM90068	
Dunstaffnage Castle	Kilmore and Kilbride, near Oban	Partially ruined castle	SM90120	
Dunstaffnage Castle Chapel	Kilmore and Kilbride, near Oban	Roofless medieval chapel	SM90121	
Inch Kenneth Chapel	Inchkenneth	Remains of a 13th-century parish church	SM90168	
McLeans's Cross	Iona	15th-century freestanding cross	SM90173	
Kilchurn Castle, Dalmally	Loch Awe	Substantial remains of a late medieval castle	SM90179	
Kilmory Knap Chapel	South Knapdale	Medieval chapel and carved stones	SM90185	
St Blane's Church and monastery	Kingarth, Bute	Site of the early monastery of St Blane	SM90264	
Iona Nunnery	Iona	Ruined Augustinian convent	SM90350	

== See also ==
- List of Category A listed buildings in Argyll and Bute
