= Castle Coeffin =

Ruined castle in Argyll, Scotland

Coeffin Castle
- Lismore, Loch Linnhe, Argyll, Scotland
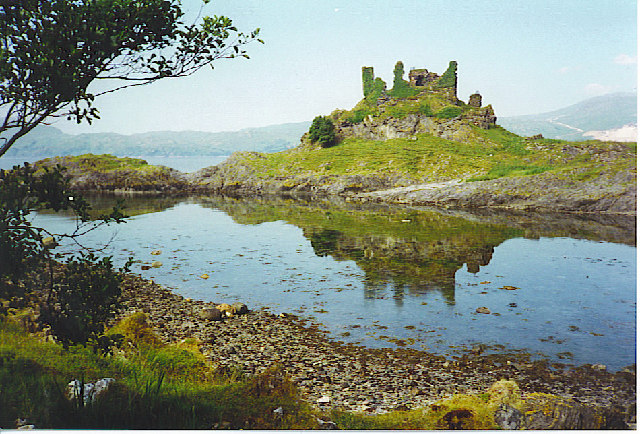
- Castle Coeffin ruins

Site information
- Type: Castle

Location
- Coordinates: 56.53680°N 5.49235°W

Scheduled monument
- Official name: Coeffin Castle
- Type: Secular: castle
- Designated: 16 April 1964
- Reference no.: SM2433

Castle Coeffin is a ruin on the island of Lismore, an island in Loch Linnhe, in Argyll, on the west coast of Scotland. It stands on a promontory on the north-west coast of the island, across Loch Linnhe from Glensanda, at grid reference NM853437.

== History ==
Coeffin Castle was built on the site of a Viking fortress. The name Coeffin is thought to come from Caifen who was a Danish prince, and whose sister supposedly haunted the castle until her remains were taken back to be buried beside her lover in Norway.

Coeffin Castle was built in the 13th century, probably by the MacDougalls of Lorn. Lismore was an important site within their lordship, being the location of St. Moluag's Cathedral, seat of the Bishop of Argyll. The first written evidence of the castle occurs in 1469–70, when it was granted to Sir Colin Campbell of Glenorchy by Colin Campbell, 1st Earl of Argyll. It is unlikely to have been occupied in post-mediaeval times.

== The ruins ==
The ruins comprise an oblong hall-house and an irregularly shaped bailey. The great hall is an irregular rectangle, measuring 20.3 by 10.4 metres (67 by 34 ft) The walls are from 2.1 to 2.4 metres (6 ft 11 in to 7 ft 10 in) thick. The bailey was mostly built at a later date than the hall. An external stair probably linked the entrance, in the north-east wall, to the bailey. A second door gave access to the sea to the south-west.

== Other features ==
A tidal fish trap, of unknown age, is located in the small bay to the south-east of the castle. To the north-east of the castle are the remains of a stone-walled fort. The Ordnance Gazetteer of Scotland, published in 1892, lists a Castle Rachal in the same general location as Castle Coeffin. It is described as "a very ancient Scandinavian fortalice in Lismore and Appin parish, Argyllshire, on the NW side of Lismore island, 4 kilometres (2.5 mi) from the north-eastern extremity, now a dilapidated ivy-clad ruin."
