= Archdeacon of Argyll =

The Archdeacon of Argyll (or Lismore) was the only archdeacon in the diocese of Argyll, acting as a subordinate of the Bishop of Argyll. Regarding his supporting churches, it is known that archdeacon held a quarter of parish church of Eilean Munde as a prebend.

== List of archdeacons of Argyll ==
- Cristin, fl. 1230 x 1236 – 1240
- Gille-Brighde (Gilbertus), fl. 1262–1270
- Muireadhach (Mauricius), fl. 1334
- Labhrann (Laurentius), fl. 1353
- Eoin Mac Dubhghall, x 1361–1387
- Walter de Wardlaw, 1387
- Alexander de Wardlaw, 1387–1388
- Daibhidh Mac Murchaidh, 1388–1391 x 1395
  - [Opposed by] John Leche, 1388–1391
- Conghan Mac Phaidein, 1391 x 1395–1397
- Niall Caimbeul, 1395–1433 x 1437
- Dubhghall Caimbeul of Lochawe, 1437–1453x1467
  - [Opposed by] Peter de Dalkeith, c. 1441
- John Lauder, 1441 x 1467–c.1473
- Peter Sandilands, 1473–1475
- Robert Houston, provided 1475
- John Whitelaw, provided 1475
- William Elphinstone, 1475 x 1478–1480 x 1481 (later Bishop of Ross)
  - John Bickertone to receive in exchange, 1479, but never carried through
- John Brown, 1480 x 1483–1483
- Eoin Caimbeul, 1483 x 1486–1487 (later Bishop of the Isles)
- Raibeart Caimbeul, 1487–1490
- Andrew Forman, 1490 (later Bishop of Moray)
- Eoin Arbri, 1490
- David Cunningham, 1489–1509
- Robert Barry, 1509–1526
- Eoin Mac Adhaimh ("John Makcaw"), 1531–1554
- Robert Montgomery, 1554–1601
- Donnchadh Caimbeul, 1601–1603
- James Kirk, 1604–1622
- Adhamh Buidhe (Adam Boyd), 1622–1629
- Gilleasbaig Mac Lachlainn (Archibald MacLauchlane), 1629–1640

== See also ==
- Bishop of Argyll
