= Bernera Island =

Tidal island off Lismore, in Argyll, Scotland

Beàrnaraigh (Gaelic)
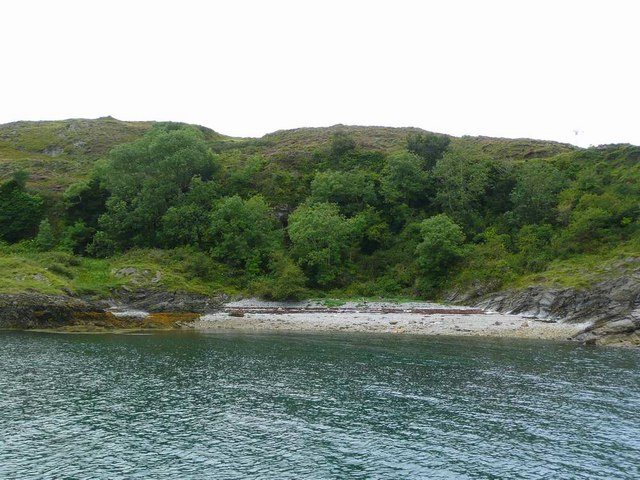
- The eastern shore opposite Achadun Castle

Location
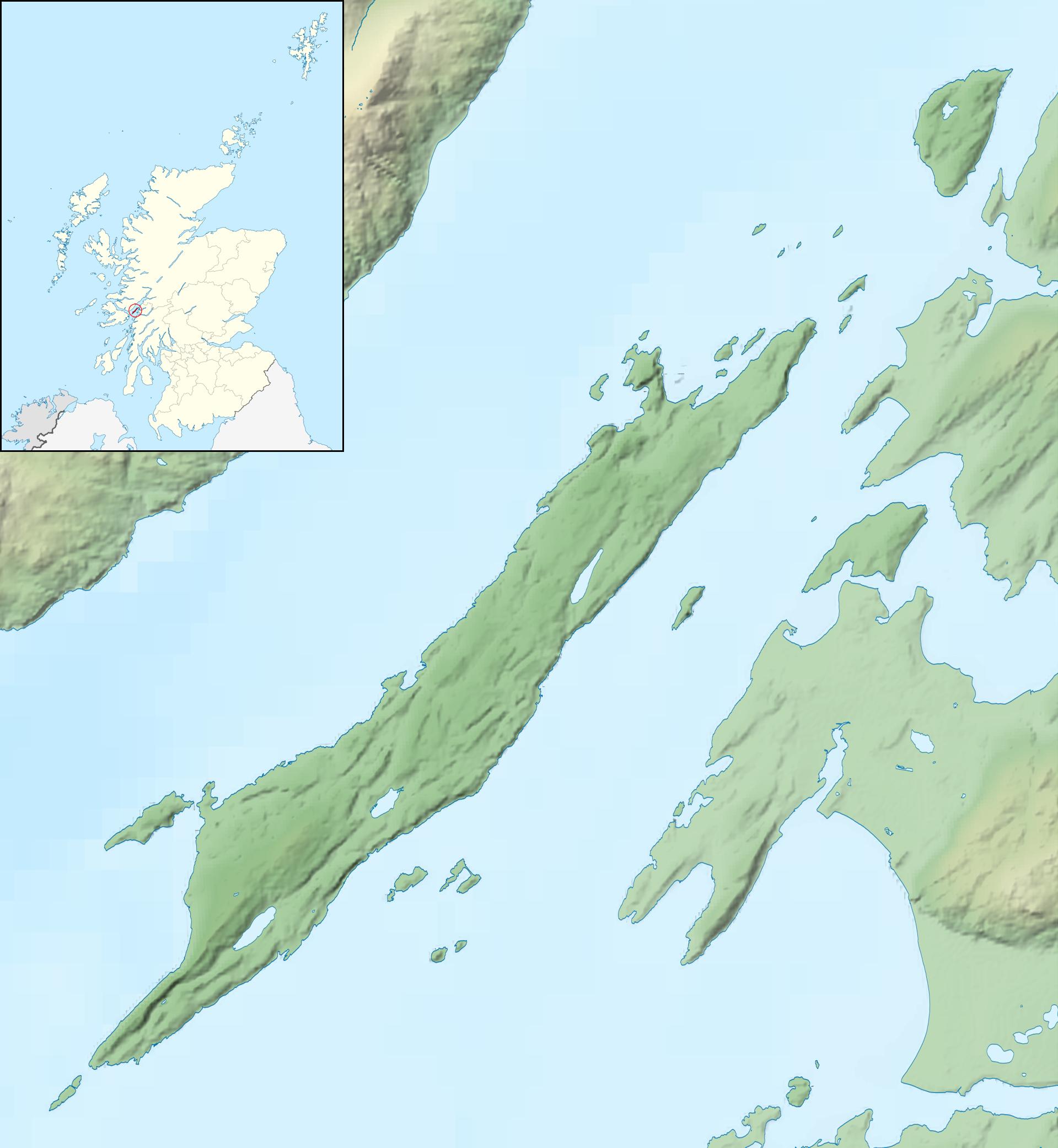
- Bernera Island shown next to Lismore Bernera Island shown within Argyll and Bute
- OS grid reference: NM794393
- Coordinates: 56.495°N 5.58°W

Name
- Name meaning: Bjørn's island, from Norse

Physical geography
- Island group: Mull
- Area: 34 ha (1/8 sq mi)
- Highest elevation: 58 m (190 ft)

Administration
- Council area: Argyll and Bute
- Country: Scotland
- Sovereign state: United Kingdom

Demographics
- Population: 0

Bernera Island (Scottish Gaelic: Beàrnaraigh) or simply Bernera is a tidal island off Lismore, in Argyll, Scotland.

== History ==
In the 6th century, Bernera was settled by monks of the Irish Culdee church under the leadership of St. Moluag. St. Columba used the island as a private place for retreat, meditation and prayer, and may have preached under (and possibly planted) a vast yew tree. It is reported that the wood was turned into a staircase for Lochnell Castle at Ardmenhuis and survived at least two fires, which burned down the rest of the building.

The island has the remains of an ancient chapel and burial ground.

== Natural history ==
The island is limestone and this reflected in the diversity of species found on the island.

Bernera Island is designated a Site of Special Scientific Interest on the basis of its feature of limestone maritime cliffs along with the presence of the nationally scarce rock whitebeam.

The common seal is a regular visitor to the coastal strip between the high and low water marks. This littoral zone forms part of the Eileanan agus Sgeirean Lios mòr Special Area of Conservation along with the nearby islets of Eilean na Cloich and Eilean Dubh in the Lynn of Lorn to the east and Dubh Sgeir and Eilean Gainimh in the Lynn of Morvern to the west.
