= Liosmor =

Liosmor may refer to:

- Lismore, County Waterford, Ireland, a town (Gaelic name: Lios Mór)
- Lismore, Scotland, an island in the Inner Hebrides (Gaelic name: Lios Mòr)
