= Laurence de Ergadia =

Thirteenth-century Scottish bishop

- Bishop of Argyll
- Church: Roman Catholic Church
- See: Diocese of Argyll
- In office: 1262 × 1264–1299 × 1300
- Predecessor: Alan
- Successor: Andrew

Orders
- Consecration: 31 March 1264 × 20 June 1268

Personal details
- Born: unknown Argyll ?
- Died: 1299 × 1300

Laurence de Ergadia (d. 1299 × 1300) was a thirteenth-century Scottish bishop. Probably from the MacDougall kindred of Argyll, Laurence had become a Dominican friar and presumably university graduate before being elected Bishop of Argyll, an election which took place sometime between 1262 and 1264. Although the election was quashed by the Pope in 1264, the Pope gave him a fresh provision to the bishopric. Laurence appears intermittently in the records during his three and a half decade episcopate, but his activities in his own diocese are badly recorded. He died as Bishop of Argyll sometime in either 1299 or 1300.

== Biography ==
=== Background ===
Laurence is given the cognomen de Ergardia in a late note written into the margins of the Chronicle of Melrose. It is simply the Latin for "of Argyll", a region encompassing (roughly) the west coast of central Scotland; it does suggest, especially if it is meant as a surname, that Laurence came from the family of the MacDougall Lords of Argyll, who used de Ergadia as a "surname" in the Latin documents of the period.

Laurence was a Dominican friar by the time he became Bishop of Argyll in 1264, which meant he would have spent many of his earlier years abroad, and must have received a university education in the process. It is notable that during the long vacancy of the bishopric between the death of Bishop William in 1241 and the election of Bishop Alan 1248 × 1250, the bishopric was for several years under the custody of Clement, Bishop of Dunblane, himself a Dominican, the first Dominican to hold a bishopric in Scotland.

This custody occurred in a period when, urged on by Bishop Clement, King Alexander II of Scotland had become more assertive in the area, particularly in relation to overlordship over its MacDougall ruler, Eóghan of Argyll. The events of that decade thus may have induced Eóghan, at Clement's urging, to send a kinsman to be trained as a Dominican, and Laurence was indeed the first of three Dominican bishops of Argyll in the following century, another of whom appears to have been a MacDougall also. It might also be noted that the bishopric of Dunblane was partly dedicated to St Laurence, after whom Laurence may have been named.

=== Bishop of Argyll ===
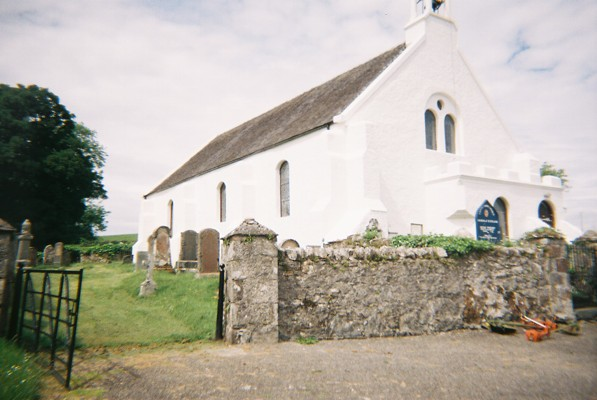
St Moluog's parish church on Lismore; it incorporates the remains of the cathedral of Lismore, at the time the seat of Laurence's Argyll bishopric.

After the death of Bishop Alan in 1262, three compromissarrii (voting delegates) were selected by the cathedral chapter of the diocese of Argyll to elect a new bishop, and after the election of Laurence, the Dean of the chapter travelled to the papal curia to obtain confirmation. Pope Urban IV declared the election void on a technicality, but on 31 March 1264, issued a mandate to Gamelin, Bishop of St Andrews, and Richard de Inverkeithing, Bishop of Dunkeld, authorising them to confirm the election of Laurence to the bishopric of Argyll, and instructed them to arrange for his consecration, if they found him fit.

Although it is not definitively known when Laurence was consecrated, he had received consecration by the date he is found witnessing charters of Bishop Gamelin of St Andrews at Loch Leven, namely on 20–28 June 1268. He is found at Ayr on 23 October 1269, confirming the rights of Paisley Abbey to some churches in the bishopric of Argyll; and is found at Paisley on 6 May – 9 July 1270, attaching his seal to two charters granted by a landowner from Cowal to the abbey. A papal mandate of 15 March 1273 named Bishop Laurence as one of the three bishops authorised to consecrate William Wishart as Bishop of St Andrews, though there is no direct proof he was present at the latter's consecration, which took place on 15 October, at Scone.

In the summer of 1274 Laurence was one of the four bishop from the Kingdom of Scotland to attend the Second Council of Lyon, and his seal is found attached to one of the Council's acts, dated 13 July 1274. Later in the year he was chosen as a papal mandatory to help resolve a dispute between Robert Wishart, Bishop of Glasgow, and the Glasgow cathedral chapter; at Muthill on 19 July 1275, Laurence and the other papal mandatory, Robert de Prebenda, Bishop of Dunblane, ordered the case to be heard later in that year, but details of the outcome have not survived. In 1275 he was named as one of the three bishops chosen to consecrate Archibald Herok as Bishop of Caithness, the other two being Archibald, Bishop of Moray, and Hugh de Benin, Bishop of Aberdeen. Bishop Laurence is named as a papal mandatory once more on 5 April 1281, being authorised to legitimise a marriage of Hugh de Abernethy to Maria, sister of Alexander of Argyll, Laurence's probable kinsman.

On 2 September 1284, he issued a charter to Paisley Abbey from Kilfinan in the diocese of Argyll; sometime between 1286 and 1292 his seal was appended to a charter issued to the same abbey by Alexander Óg, Lord of Islay. On 3 October 1289, a papal mandate was issued to him regarding the relationship between Iona Abbey and the Bishop of the Isles, with the former seeking to be removed from the sphere of authority of the latter bishop, at that time Bishop Mark. Laurence is found among the prelates, magnates and barons of Scotland giving their assent to the Treaty of Birgham on 17 March 1290, but unlike most of Scotland's senior political figures, is not found giving King Edward I of England an oath of fealty before the Great Cause in 1291, nor at any time afterwards.

He largely disappeared from the records in the 1290s, and his last known act was to send a proctor to argue on his behalf in front of a papal judge-delegate at Glasgow on 29 October 1299; he was dead by 18 December 1300, the date that the Pope provided and consecrated his successor Andrew.

== Notes ==
Religious titles
Preceded by Alan	Bishop of Argyll; 1262 × 1264–1299 × 1300	Succeeded by Andrew
