= Hector McLaine =

Hector McLaine (1605–1687) was a prominent Scottish clergyman who served as Protestant Bishop of Argyll.

== Life ==
He was born in Duart Castle 1605 the son of Rev Angus McLaine of Knock, minister of Morvern, and his wife Mary MacKean. He was descended from the MacLaines of Lochbuie. He replaced his father as minister of Morvern in 1639. In 1666 he translated to Dunoon but returned to Morvern in 1668. He translated to Eastwood in 1679. In May 1680 he was elected Bishop of Argyll to succeed Colin Falconer. He was consecrated in 1680 and died in 1687. His position as Bishop was filled by Alexander Monro.

== Family ==
He married Jean Boyd daughter of Rev Thomas Boyd of Eaglesham. Their children were:

- Captain Andrew McLaine of Knock, a Gaelic poet
- Rev Aeneas McLaine, minister of Kilfinan
- Sir Alexander McLaine of Otter
- Lt John McLaine, killed at the battle of Kaiserswerth in 1702
- Janet, married Lachlan Oig Maclean
