= Tirefour Castle =

- Tirefour Broch
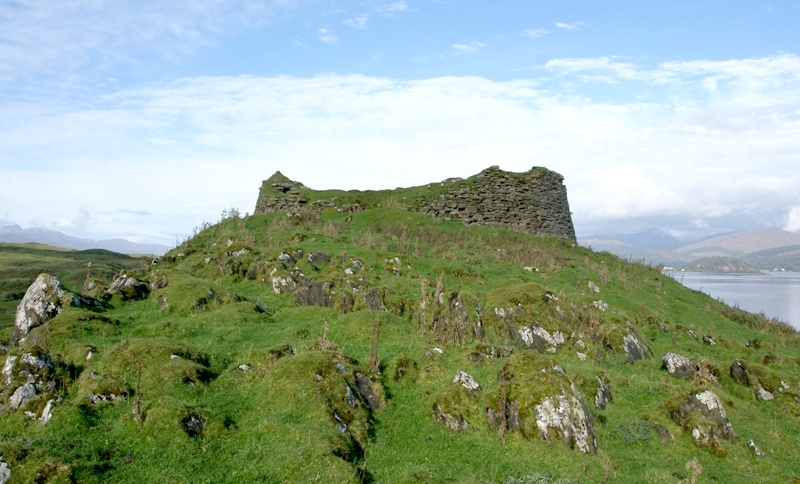
- Tirefour Broch

- Shown on Lismore Shown within Argyll and Bute
- 56°31′47″N 5°28′09″W
- Type: Broch
- Periods: Iron Age
- Location: Lismore, Scotland

Site notes
- Public access: Yes

Tirefour Castle, (or Tirefour Broch, also spelled Tirfuir and Tirrefour) is an Iron Age broch located 4 kilometres north of Achnacroish on the island of Lismore, Scotland.

== Location ==
Tirefour Castle (grid reference NM86754290) is situated on a rocky height on the east coast of the island of Lismore. In clear weather Ben Nevis can be seen to the north, Ben Cruachan to the east and the Paps of Jura to the south. There is a steep slope on the northwest side and on the southeast side. The latter slope turns into a rolling plateau that ends in a steep cliff. The broch can easily be approached from the northeast and the southwest.

== Dating ==
The broch was probably built in the late Iron Age. It was inhabited during the Roman era as shown by the discovery of an enamel brooch in the foundation layer.

The broch was inhabited until the Middle Ages. Among the finds in the broch was a decorative pin from the 8th century and a Norse pin and rivets, dating from the 11th or 12th century. Located near the broch are the remains of a rectangular building in the Norse style.

== Construction ==
Tirefour Castle has an almost circular floor plan. The lower floor has a solid, dry stone wall. This walls are 4.5 m thick. and the internal diameter is approximately 12.2 metres. The wall is on average 3 metres high and survives to a maximum height of 4.9 metres in the southeast corner. The entrance to the broch is located on the southwest side and is 1.4 metres wide. There are no indications of an intramural room (guard cell) at the entrance.

A supporting (scarcement) ledge is evident in the interior of the broch. It is located 2.5 metres above the original ground level. The ledge is 60 centimetres wide and is intact for about three quarters of the inner circumference.

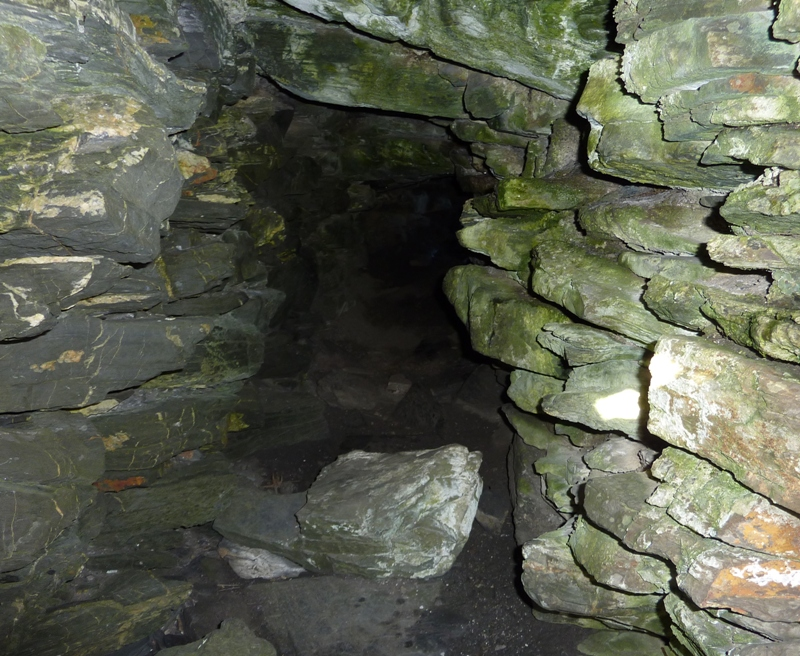
Intramural gallery

On the northwestern and eastern sides, at a height of 2.5 metres above the original ground level, intramural galleries can be seen. The gallery is 61 centimetres wide and 107 centimetres high. On the west side the gallery is 7 metres long. The ceiling of the gallery is formed by large, flat stones.

The interior of the broch is partly filled with earth to a height of at least 1 metre. In 2010, beneath the earth on the north side, a 1 metre wide opening was found, which probably gave access to an intramural room or staircase. Surrounding the broch can be seen traces of two walls, which offered additional protection to the northeast and southwest sides. In the southern wall is an opening which is aligned with the entrance to the broch.
