= Moluag =

6th-century Roman Catholic missionary

Saint Moluag
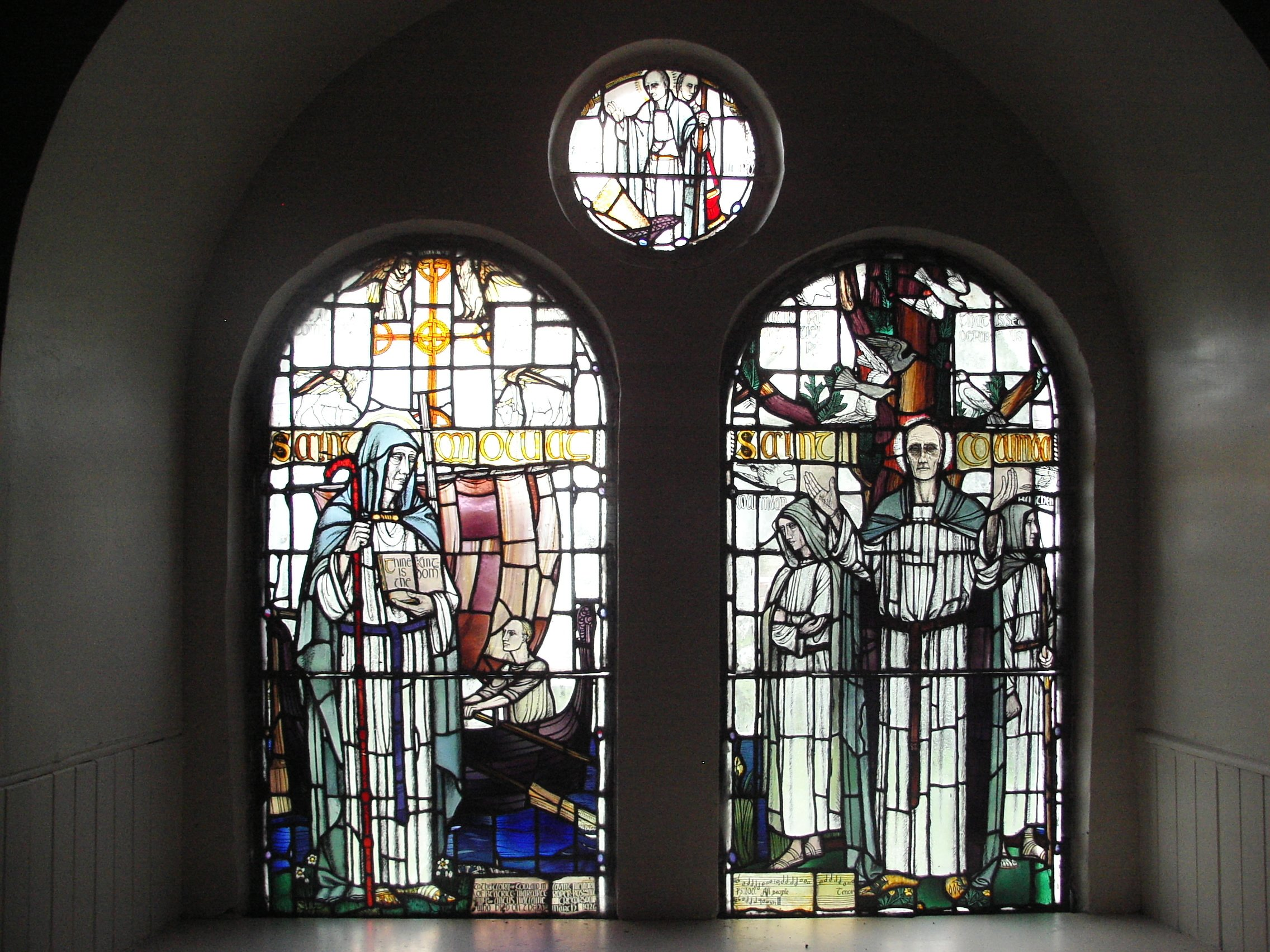
- The Saints Window in Kilmoluag, Lismore depicting St Moluag and St Columba

Bishop of Lismore Apostle of the Picts Patron Saint of Argyll
- Born: c. 500–520; Ireland
- Died: 592; Rosemarkie
- Venerated in: Roman Catholic Church; Anglican Church; Eastern Orthodox Church
- Major shrine: Isle of Lismore
- Feast: 25 June
- Patronage: Argyll; on Lewis invoked against madness

Saint Moluag (c. 510 – 592; also known as Lua, Luan, Luanus, Lugaidh, Moloag, Molluog, Molua, Murlach, Malew) was a Scottish missionary, and a contemporary of Saint Columba, who evangelized the Picts of Scotland in the sixth century. Saint Moluag was the patron saint of Argyll as evidenced by a charter in 1544, from the Earl of Argyll, which states "in honour of God Omnipotent, the blessed Virgin, and Saint Moloc, our patron". The House of Lorne became the kings of Dalriada and eventually united with the Picts to become the kings of Scots.

== Name ==
Saint Lughaidh, better known by his pet name of Moluag, was an Irish noble of the Dál nAraide (one of the main tribes of the Ulaid in what is now called Ulster). There are various Irish forms of the name, such as Lughaidh (or Lugaid), Luoc and Lua. Latinized they become Lugidus, Lugidius, Lugadius, Lugacius and Luanus.

The name, as it has come down the centuries, Moluag or Moluoc, is made up of the honorific mo, plus the original name Lughaidh, pronounced Lua, plus the endearing suffix –oc.

== Sources ==
MacDonald suggests that there must have been a vita of Moluag that is lost, because of his prominent appearance in Bernard's Life of Malachy. He writes "Further support for this occurs in the Life of Patrick by the Cistercian monk Jocelin of Furness written in circa 1185, where Mo-Luóc ("Lugacius") is described as one of the six Irish priests whom Patrick prophesied would become bishops".

In a footnote, he adds that the five other priests were Columbanus (Cólman), Meldanus (Mellán), Lugadius (Mo Lua), Cassanus (Cassán) and Creanus (Ciarán).

Moluag was a bishop active during the period of the First Order of Celtic Saints and known as 'The Clear and Brilliant, The Sun of Lismore in Alba'.

== Life ==
Moluag was born between 500 and 520. He may have been the Lugaid mentioned in The Life of St Comgall, who ordained him and to whom he may have had links of kinship.

He left with twelve followers to lead the life of a missionary. Tradition states that the rock on which Moluag stood detached itself from the Irish coast and he drifted across to the island of the Lyn of Lorn in Argyll now called the Isle of Lismore, in Loch Linnhe, where, in 562, he founded his community. (Lios mor is ancient Gaelic for 'great courtyard' in reference to the monastery). This had been the sacred island of the Western Picts whose capital was at Beregonium, across the water at Benderloch.

Lismore was the most important religious spot to the pagan kings of the area. Their kings were cremated on the ancient man-made "burial mound" of Cnoc Aingeil (Gaelic for 'Hill of Fire') at Bachuil, about three miles from the north of the island, near the site that Moluag chose for his first centre. It was therefore the most desirable site for a missionary. Irish missionaries had learnt to focus heavily on the similarity and continuity between early Christianity and Paganism rather than the differences between them. The conversion process was, therefore, one of gradual education rather than outright confrontation.

MacDonald describes Lismore as being "hugely important, being closely tied with one of the earliest and most important Christian Saints in Northern Britain: Mo Luóc, or Moluag".

After founding a monastery on the Isle of Lismore, Moluag went on to found two other great centres in the land of the Picts at Rosemarkie and Mortlach. These were his three centres of teaching, and all three were to become the seats of the Roman Catholic sees of the Isles, Ross and Aberdeen. W. Douglas Simpson noted that Moluag laboured in Argyll, Ross, and Banff. He remains best-remembered for his work in Aberdeenshire, where he established three churches in the valley of the River Dee—Tarland, Migvie, and Durris. However, Simpson regarded the most important of Moluag's establishments to be the Clova Monastery in Kildrummy.

In his Life of the Irish Saint Malachy, Bernard of Clairvaux wrote of Moluag, "One of the sons of that sacred family (Bangor) Lua by name, is said himself alone to have been the founder of a hundred monasteries", with Michael Barrett clarifying this as a reference to monastic houses in Ireland.

Moluag lived to extreme old age and died on 25 June 592 in the Garioch and was buried at his monastery in Rosemarkie, Ross-shire, Scotland. The Annals of Ulster record the death of Lugaid of Les Mór in 592: Obitus Lugide Lis Moer.

== Veneration ==
Moluag is said to have been buried at Rosemarkie on the Moray Firth, though his remains were later transported to Lismore and honoured in the cathedral which bore his name.

The feast day of Saint Moluag (25 June) was restored in 1898 by Pope Leo XIII. He is one of the 48 saints referred to in the Lorrha ("Stowe") Missal used by churches of Ireland, Scotland, Britain, France, Germany, Switzerland, and northern Italy: "Saint Lua of Lismore, Pray for us".

The Coarb, or successor, of Saint Moluag, is the Livingstone chief of the Clan MacLea. This Livingstone family of Lismore had long been the hereditary abbots of Lismore and, hence, possessors of the crozier of the saint.

The bell of Saint Moluag was in existence until the sixteenth century, when it disappeared during the Reformation. An ancient bell found at Kilmichael Glassary, Argyll, was thought to have been the lost bell.

== Legacy and dedications ==
Several churches were dedicated to Saint Moluag, including:

- St Moluag's Cathedral (Kilmoluag), Lismore;
- Teampull Mholuaidh, Lewis;
- Kirk Malew, the Isle of Man.

Other sites include churches at Clatt and Tarland, in Aberdeenshire; and also churches on Skye, Mull, Raasay, Tiree, and Pabay. At Alyth in Perth and Kinross there remain the ruins, known as "The Alyth Arches", of a church which was built on the site of an older sixth-century church dedicated to the saint. It has been suggested that the concentration of dedications to Moluag in North-East Scotland, and particularly in the vicinity of Rhynie, may be a legacy of a saint cult promoted during the reign of Nechtan mac Der-Ilei and contemporaneous with the ascendancy of the Cenél Loairn, with whom his Pictish kingdom appears to have enjoyed good relations.

At Mortlach in Banffshire, where some of his relics were preserved, an abbey was founded in 1010 by Máel Coluim II of Scotland, in thanks for a victory in which the Scots had invoked the aid of Saint Moluag.

On Lewis, Saint Moluag was invoked for cures from madness.

At Clatt there was held annually "St Mallock's Fair", which lasted eight days. At Tarland there was a "Luoch Fair" which is thought to have been in honour of Saint Molaug, and at Alyth "Simmalogue Fair" was celebrated.

== Bibliography ==
- Barrett, Michael. A Calendar of Scottish Saints. Fort Augustus: The Abbey Press, 1919.
- Carmichael, Ian. Lismore in Alba.
- Farmer, David Hugh. The Oxford Dictionary of Saints. Oxford: Oxford University Press, 1992.
- Moran, Rev. Patrick. Irish Saints in Great Britain. Dublin: M H Gill & Son, 1879.
