= David H. Caldwell =

Scottish archaeologist

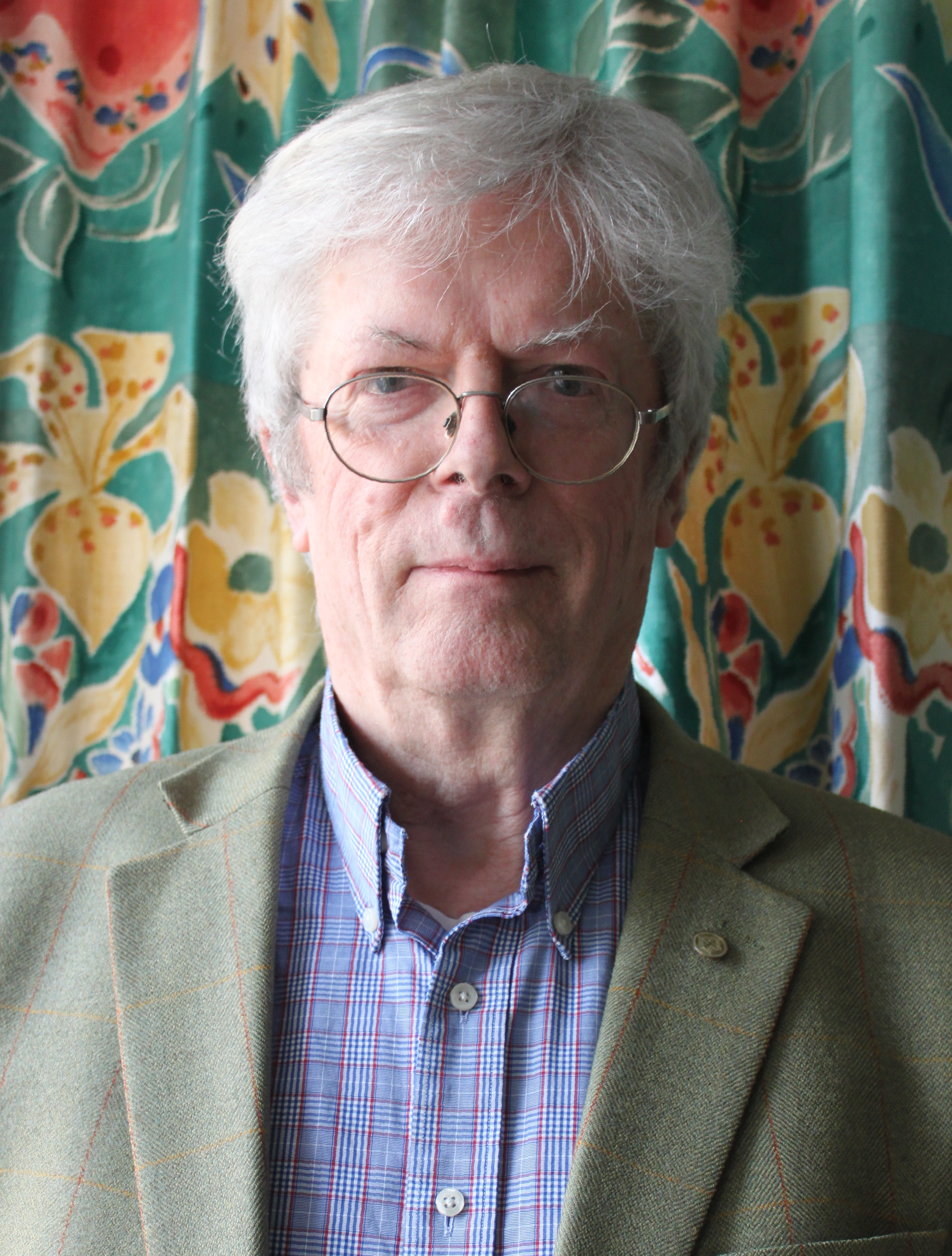
David H. Caldwell in February 2025

David H. Caldwell is a Scottish archaeologist.

== Personal life ==
David is the son of Alexander Caldwell, a maritime pilot, and Dorothy Caldwell. He was born on 15th December 1951 in Kilwinning. On 9th September 1975 he married Margaret Anne McGovern. Together, they had three children: Helen in June 1983, Barbara in April 1985, and Michael in February 1991.

== Education ==
David H. Caldwell went to school at Ardrossan Academy, Ayrshire. He then studied archaeology at Edinburgh University, graduating with a degree in the field, then gaining a PhD there on the early use of guns in Scotland.

== Career ==
=== National Museum of Scotland ===
Caldwell worked for the National Museums of Scotland for 38 years in a curatorial role, then as Keeper of Archaeology and Keeper of Scotland and Europe, before retiring in 2012.

=== Society of Antiquaries of Scotland ===
He was elected a fellow of the Society of Antiquaries of Scotland in 1971. He was President of the Society from 2014 to 2020. As of November 2025 he is an honorary fellow of the Society.

=== Society of Antiquaries of London ===
He was made a fellow of the Society of Antiquaries of London in 1998.

=== Fieldwork ===
==== Finlaggan ====
David H. Caldwell directed a major archaeological project at Finlaggan in Islay on behalf of the National Museums of Scotland from 1989 to 1998. His excavations demonstrated that this was a high status site. The medieval archaeology of Finlaggan covered the whole period. David H. Caldwell's book, The Archaeology of Finlaggan, Islay confirms that Finlaggan was the centre of power of the Lordship of the Isles, a quasi-independent state of political and cultural importance in the 14th and 15th centuries. His work also revealed the existence of an unnamed castle from the 12th and 13th centuries, with a stone keep on Eilean na Comhairle and various buildings, including a great hall, enclosed in a timberwork defence around Eilean Mor.

== Selected publications ==
- Caldwell, D. (1979) The Scottish Armoury. Edinburgh: Blackwood. ISBN 978-0-85158-131-6
- Caldwell, D. (1981) Scottish Weapons and Fortifications, 1100-1800. J. Donald. ISBN 978-0-85976-047-8
- Caldwell, D. (1982) Angels, nobles and unicorns. Edinburgh: National Museum of Antiquities of Scotland. ISBN 978-0-9503117-1-5
- Caldwell, D. (1998) Scotland's Wars and Warriors. Stationery Office. ISBN 978-0-11-495786-5
- Caldwell, D. (2010) The Lewis Chessmen Unmasked. National Museums of Scotland. ISBN 978-1-905267-46-0
- Caldwell, D. (2011) Islay, Jura and Colonsay A Historical Guide. Birlinn. ISBN 978-1-912476-54-1
- Caldwell, D. (2014) The Lewis Chessmen New Perspectives. National Museums of Scotland. ISBN 978-1-905267-85-9
- Caldwell, D. (2017) Islay. The Land of Lordship. Birlinn. ISBN 978-1-78027-465-2
- Caldwell, D. (2018) Mull and Iona. A Historical Guide. Birlinn. ISBN 978-1-78027-525-3
- Caldwell, D, Olesky, V, Rhodes, B. (2023) The Battle of Pinkie, 1547. Oxbow Books. ISBN 978-1-78925-973-5
- Caldwell, D. (2025) The Archaeology of Finlaggan, Islay. Society of Antiquaries of Scotland. ISBN 978-1-908332-36-3
