= St Moluag's Cathedral, Lismore =

Cathedral in Argyll and Bute, Scotland

St Molaug's Cathedral
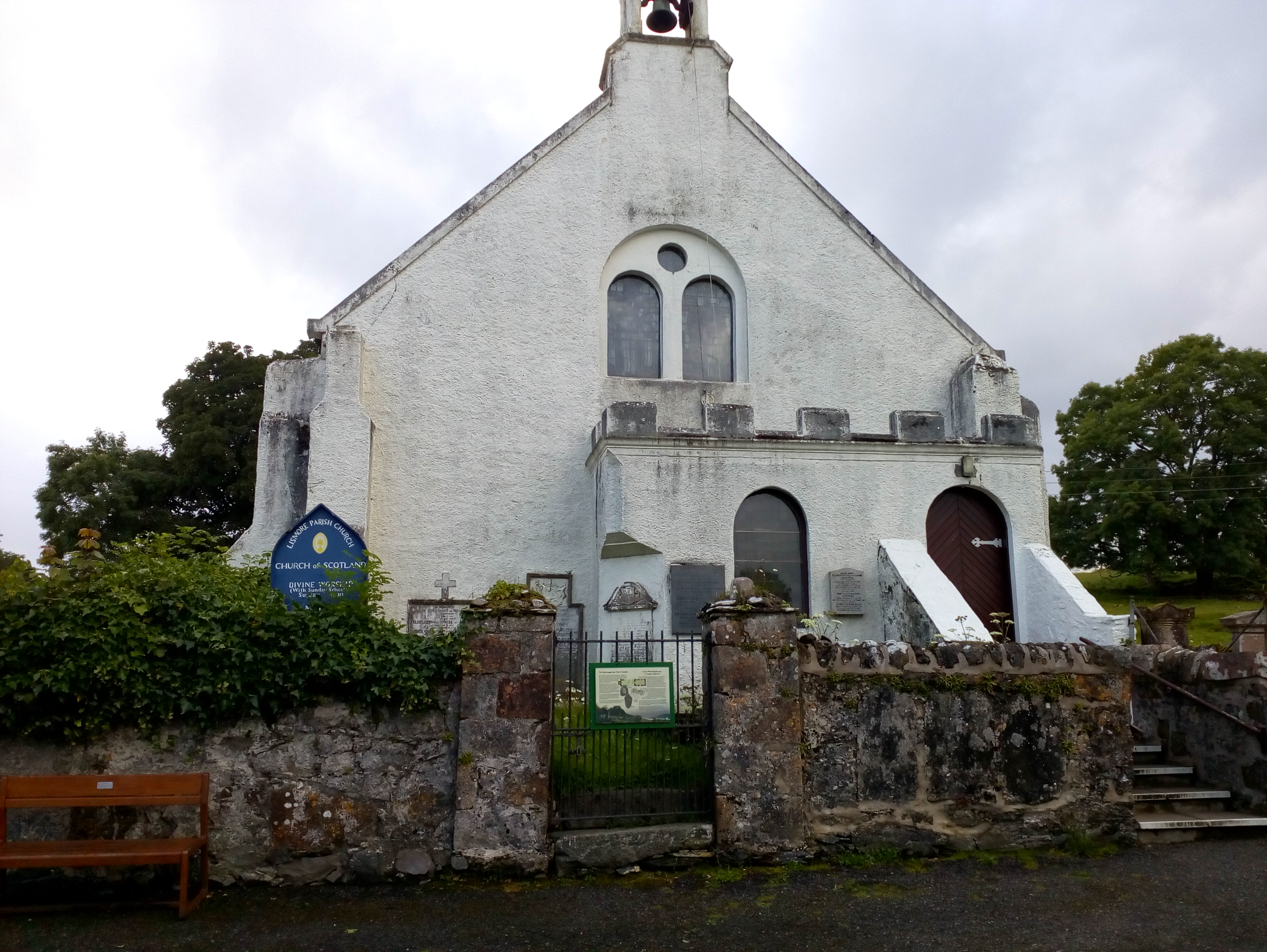
- St Molaug's Cathedral
- 56°32′4.78″N 5°28′49.03″W
- Location: Lismore, Scotland
- Denomination: Church of Scotland
- Previous denomination: Roman Catholic

St Moluag's Cathedral is a church located on the Scottish island of Lismore just off the coast of Oban. Despite its name it is no longer a cathedral as it is a church of the Church of Scotland. The present-day parish church of 1749 stands on the site of the choir of the abandoned 13th-century cathedral, incorporating much of its material, but wrapped in 18th-century design.

== History ==
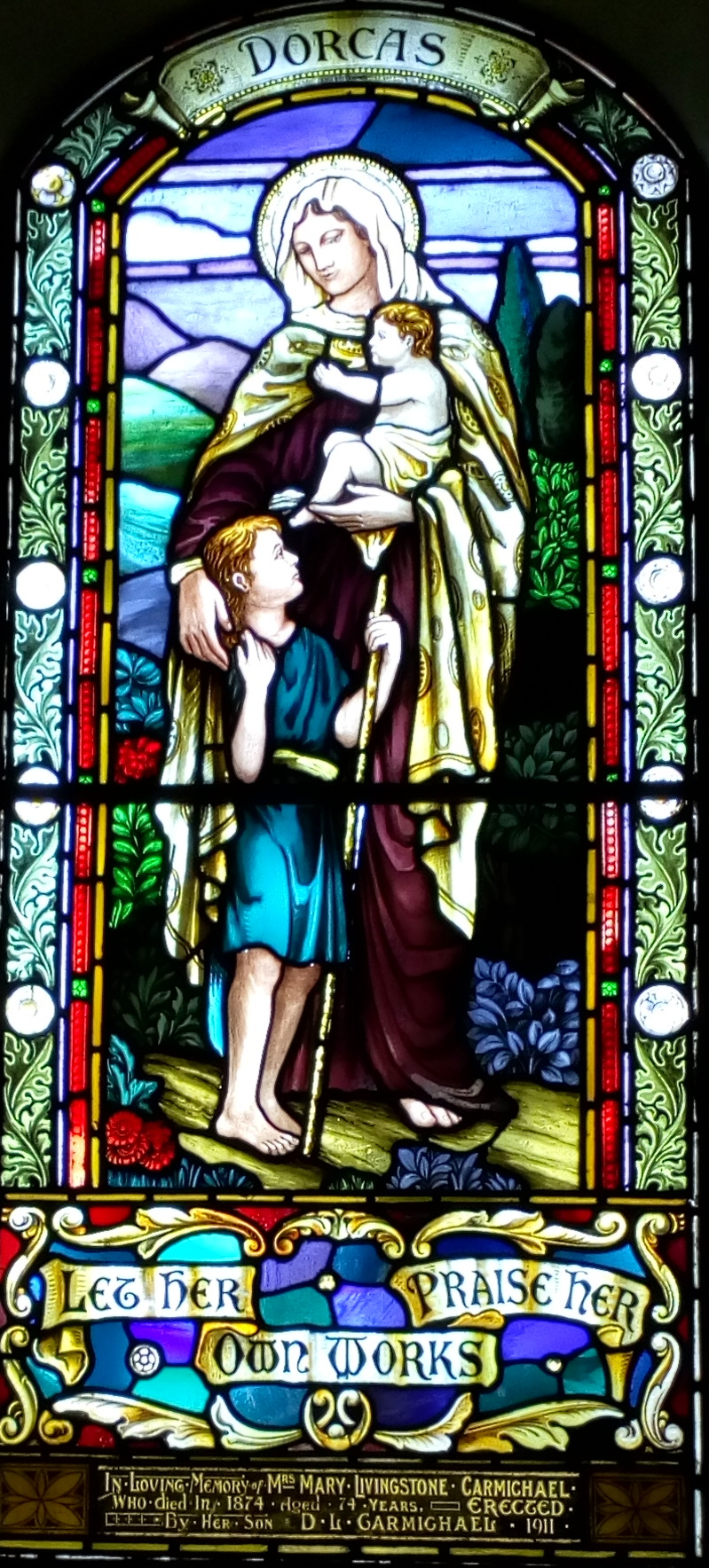
Stained glass of Dorcas within the church

Saint Moluag (Old Irish Mo-Luóc) (d. 592), founded a monastery on the island. It was a major centre of Christianity in Scotland, and the seat of the later medieval bishopric of Argyll or the Isles. To modern eyes it seems an isolated location for such a centre, but in an era when the fastest and most reliable transport was by water, Lismore was ideally situated.

The Diocese of Argyll was Scotland's most impoverished diocese, and the medieval Cathedral was very modest in scale. Robert Hay suggests that building began during the term of Bishop Laurence de Ergadia (1262 - 1299), with the western tower added during the term of Bishop Martin (1342 - 1387).

In 1749, the choir was converted to a parish church. For this purpose, the building was lowered and got new windows. The nave and western tower of the cathedral were reduced to their foundations. The chief surviving medieval features are three doorways, one blocked, another originally the entrance through the pulpitum, a piscina and the triple-arched sedilia. Several late medieval grave slabs are preserved in the church or adjoining graveyard.

== Parish ==
The building is in use as the parish church of Lismore, a congregation of the Church of Scotland. It is also linked with Appin Parish Church on the mainland. The minister is Iain Barclay; previous minister is Roderick D. M. Campbell, formerly of St Andrew's and St George's Church in Edinburgh.

== See also ==
- List of Church of Scotland parishes
