= Achnacroish =

Hamlet on the Isle of Lismore, Scotland

Coordinates: 56°30′40″N 5°29′40″W

Achnacroish: Scottish Gaelic: Achadh na Croise
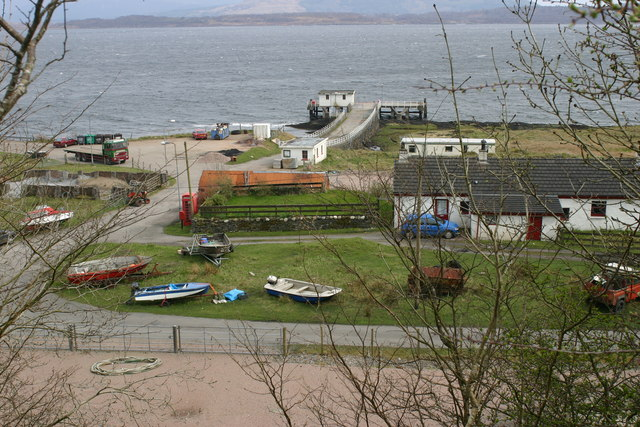
- Pier at Achnacroish

- Location within Argyll and Bute
- OS grid reference: NM851409
- Council area: Argyll and Bute
- Lieutenancy area: Argyll and Bute
- Country: Scotland
- Sovereign state: United Kingdom
- Post town: OBAN
- Postcode district: PA34
- Police: Scotland
- Fire: Scottish
- Ambulance: Scottish
- UK Parliament: Argyll, Bute and South Lochaber
- Scottish Parliament: Argyll and Bute

Achnacroish (Scottish Gaelic: Achadh na Croise) is a hamlet on the Scottish island of Lismore. The harbour serves the ferry between Lismore and Oban.

The hamlet has the island's primary school. A heritage centre and a church are within walking distance. The church is remarkable as it stands on the same spot as a cathedral that was the home of the Bishop of Argyll from the year 1200.
