= Diocese of Argyll =

Medieval Scottish diocese

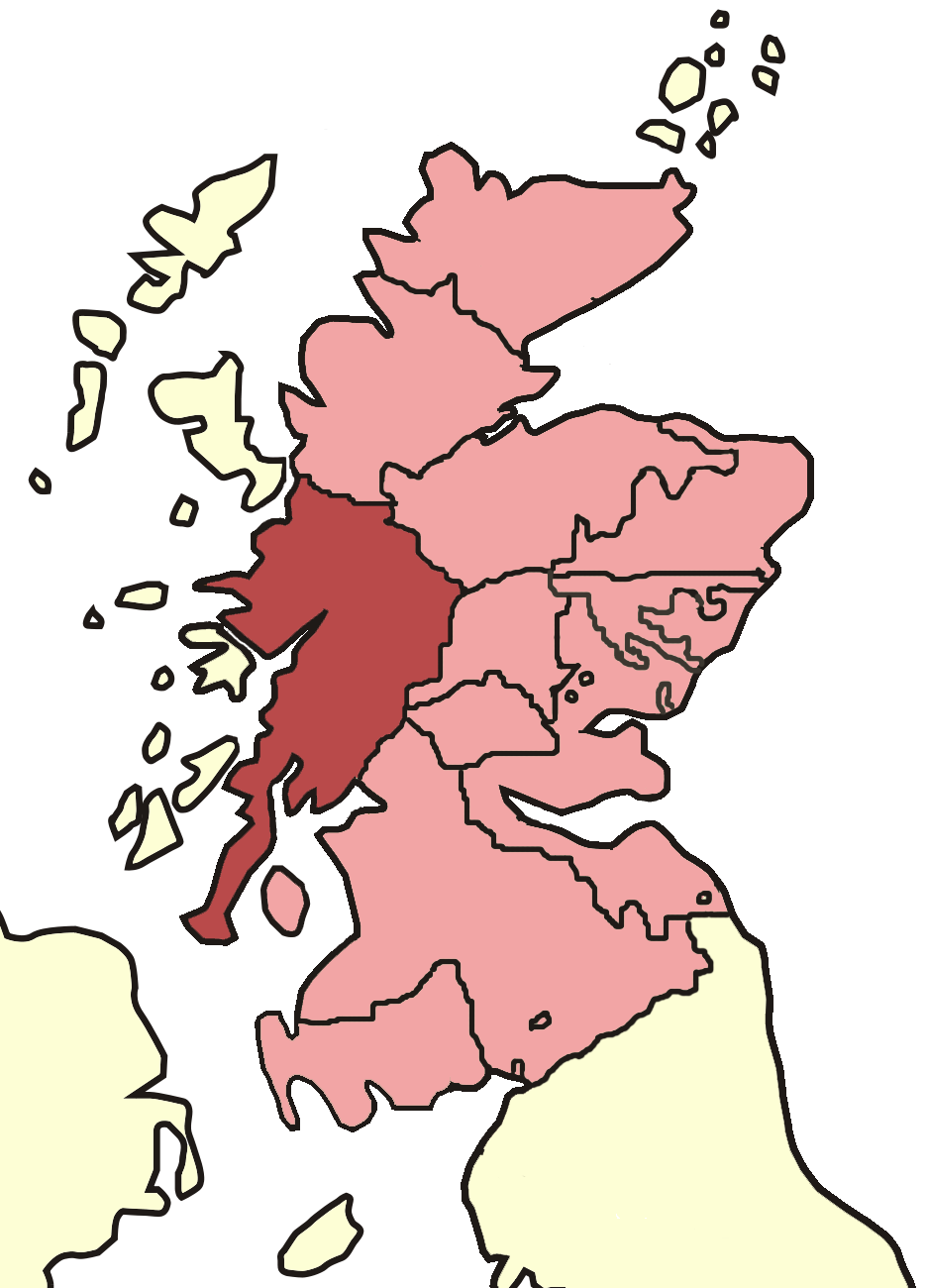
Skene's map of Scottish bishoprics in the reign of David I (reigned 1124–1153).

The Diocese of Argyll was an ecclesiastical territory or diocese of Scotland in the Middle Ages. The Diocese was led by the Bishop of Argyll, and was based at Lismore.

During the Scottish Reformation, the majority of the Scottish established church broke communion with the Pope. The establishment oscillated for a number of years over the question of whether to retain the order of bishops as leaders in the church, as the Church of England had done. Eventually the presbyterians, those who do not have bishops, became the majority of the establishment and the post-Reformation Church of Scotland. However, the Scottish Episcopal Church continued to appoint bishops for the ancient dioceses of Scotland. In 1688, the diocese was held with the Diocese of Ross because of a shortage of bishops in the Episcopal Church. This union often included the dioceses of Moray or Caithness through the 17th and 18th centuries. In 1819, the ancient Diocese of the Isles was added, and, in 1847, Alexander Ewing became the first Bishop of Argyll and the Isles. In 1878, the Roman Catholic Church founded a new diocese of the same name. Both the Episcopal and Catholic dioceses are now based in Oban.

== Medieval parishes ==
=== Deanery of Glassary ===
1. Craignish
2. Dunoon
3. Inveraray or Kilmalduff
4. Inverchaolain
5. Kilfinan
6. Kilmartin
7. Kilmichael Inverlussa
8. Kilmodan
9. Kilmorich
10. Kilmun
11. Lochgoilhead
12. Strachur or Kilmaghlas
13. Strathlachlan

=== Deanery of Kintyre ===
1. Kilberry
2. Kilblane
3. Kilchalmonell
4. Kilchenzie
5. Kilchousland
6. Kilcolmkill
7. Kilkerran
8. Kilkivan
9. Killarrow
10. Killean
11. Kilmichael
12. North Knapdale or Kilmacocharmik

=== Deanery of Lorn ===
1. Ardchattan
2. Glenorchy
3. Inishail
4. Kilbrandon (Isle of Seil)
5. Kilbride
6. Kilchattan (Isle of Luing)
7. Kilchrenan
8. Killespick-Kyril
9. Kilmelfort
10. Kilmore
11. Kilninver
12. Lismore & Appin (Cathedral)

=== Deanery of Morvern ===
1. Ardnamurchan
2. Arisaig
3. Eilean Fhianain
4. Eilean Munde or Glencoe
5. Glenelg
6. Killintag
7. Kilmallie
8. Kilmonivaig
9. Knoydart
10. Moidart
11. Morvern
