= Bishop of Argyll =

Office in the Scottish Episcopal Church

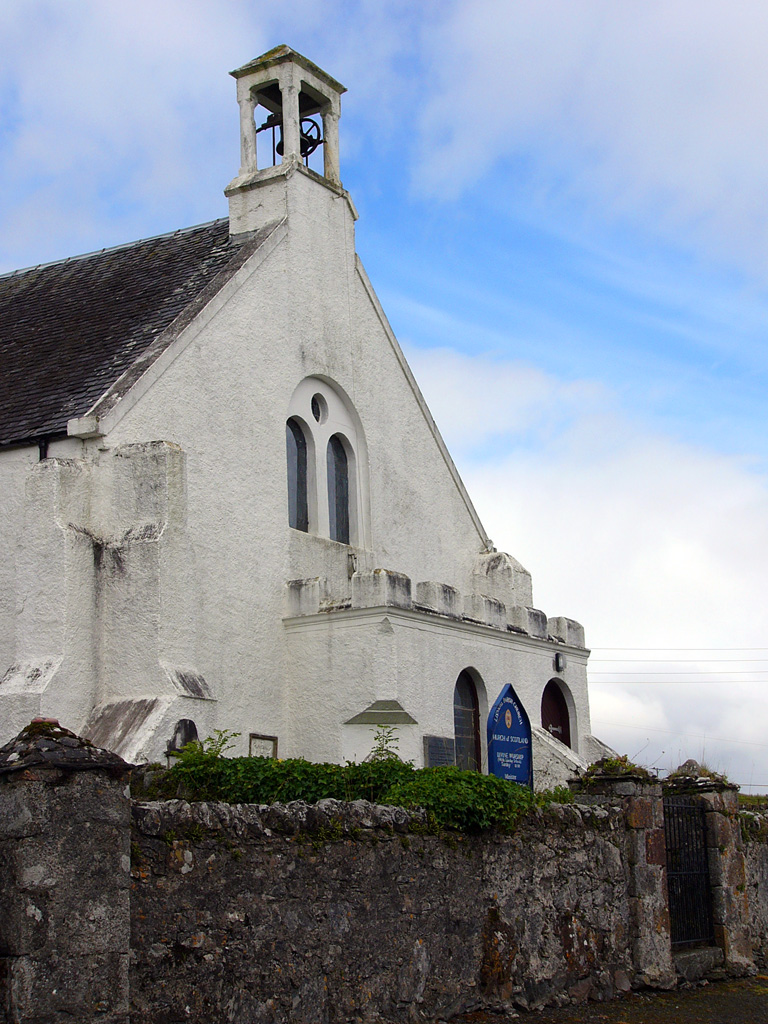
Lismore's church, Scotland

The Bishop of Argyll or Bishop of Lismore was the ecclesiastical head of the Diocese of Argyll, one of Scotland's 13 medieval bishoprics. It was created in 1200, when the western half of the territory of the Bishopric of Dunkeld was formed into the new diocese. The bishops were based at Lismore. The Bishopric of Argyll, like other Scottish bishoprics, passed into the keeping of the Scottish Episcopal Church after the Scottish Reformation.

== List of Bishops of Argyll ==
Bishops of Argyll
From	Until	Incumbent	Notes
c. 1200	c. 1230	Harald	
c. 1238	1241	William	Previously Chancellor of Moray.
c. 1252	1262	Alan	
1264	1299	Laurence de Ergadia	The Cathedral of Argyll on Lismore is thought to have been built during his term as bishop.
1301	c. 1327	Andrew	Exiled with John, Lord of Argyll following the Battle of Brander in 1308. Returned to Scotland after the Battle of Bannockburn in 1314.
el. 1342	?	Aonghas de Ergadia	Bishop-elect. Both he and a Dominican called Martin appeared before Pope Clement VI, as the succession to the see was disputed. The Pope handed the matter over to be examined by Bertrand du Pouget, Bishop of Ostia, but Aonghas died before the matter was solved.
1342	1362	Martin de Ergadia	The western tower is thought to have been added to the cathedral on Lismore during his term as bishop.
1387	1390	Iain MacDhùghaill	Appears only in continental records; he was scholar of the Pope.
1397	1411	Beoan MacGilleandrais	
?	1420	John Balsham	Resigned 1420 and retired to Ipswich Carmelite House, where he died in 1425.
1420	1426	Finlay de Albania	Accused of treasonously supporting the rebellion led by James the Fat in 1425 and subsequently fled to Ireland.
1427	1461	George Lauder	Conflict within the diocese led to him locating from Lismore to Dunoon.
1475	c. 1494	Robert Colquhoun	
1497	c. 1522	David Hamilton	
1525	c. 1535	Robert Montgomery	
1539	1553	William Cunningham	Youngest son of Lord Glencairn; provided to the see by Pope Paul III; resigned the diocese into the hands of the Pope in 1553, and became Dean of Brechin.
1553	1580	James Hamilton	Became a Protestant; also "subdean" of Glasgow from January 1580; died in office.
1580	1608	Neil Campbell	
1608	1613	John Campbell	
1613	1636	Andrew Boyd	
1637	1638	James Fairlie	As with other Scottish bishops, he was deprived by parliament in December 1638; he died in 1658. Episcopacy was restored after the Restoration.
1662	1665	David Fletcher	
1665		John Young	Appointed but not consecrated; died in June 1665.
1666	1675	William Scrogie	
c. 1675	1679	Arthur Rose	Translated to Galloway, to Glasgow, then to St Andrews.
1679	1680	Colin Falconer	Translated to Moray.
1680	1687	Hector McLaine	
1688		Alexander Monro	Nominated by James VII & II, but not consecrated

In 1689, episcopacy was permanently abolished in the Scottish Church. The line of bishops continued within the Scottish Episcopal Church, where the title was often combined with others. In 1847, Alexander Ewing became the first to bear the title Bishop of Argyll and the Isles, and, in 1878, Angus MacDonald became the first Roman Catholic bishop to bear that same title.
