= Lismore, Scotland =

Island of Inner Hebrides, Scotland

Lismore
Lios Mòr (Gaelic)
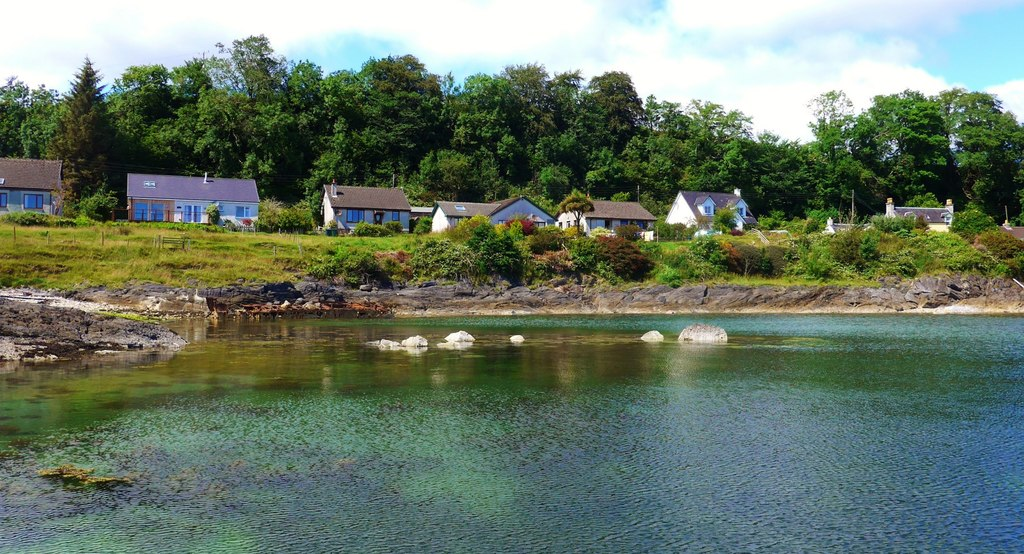
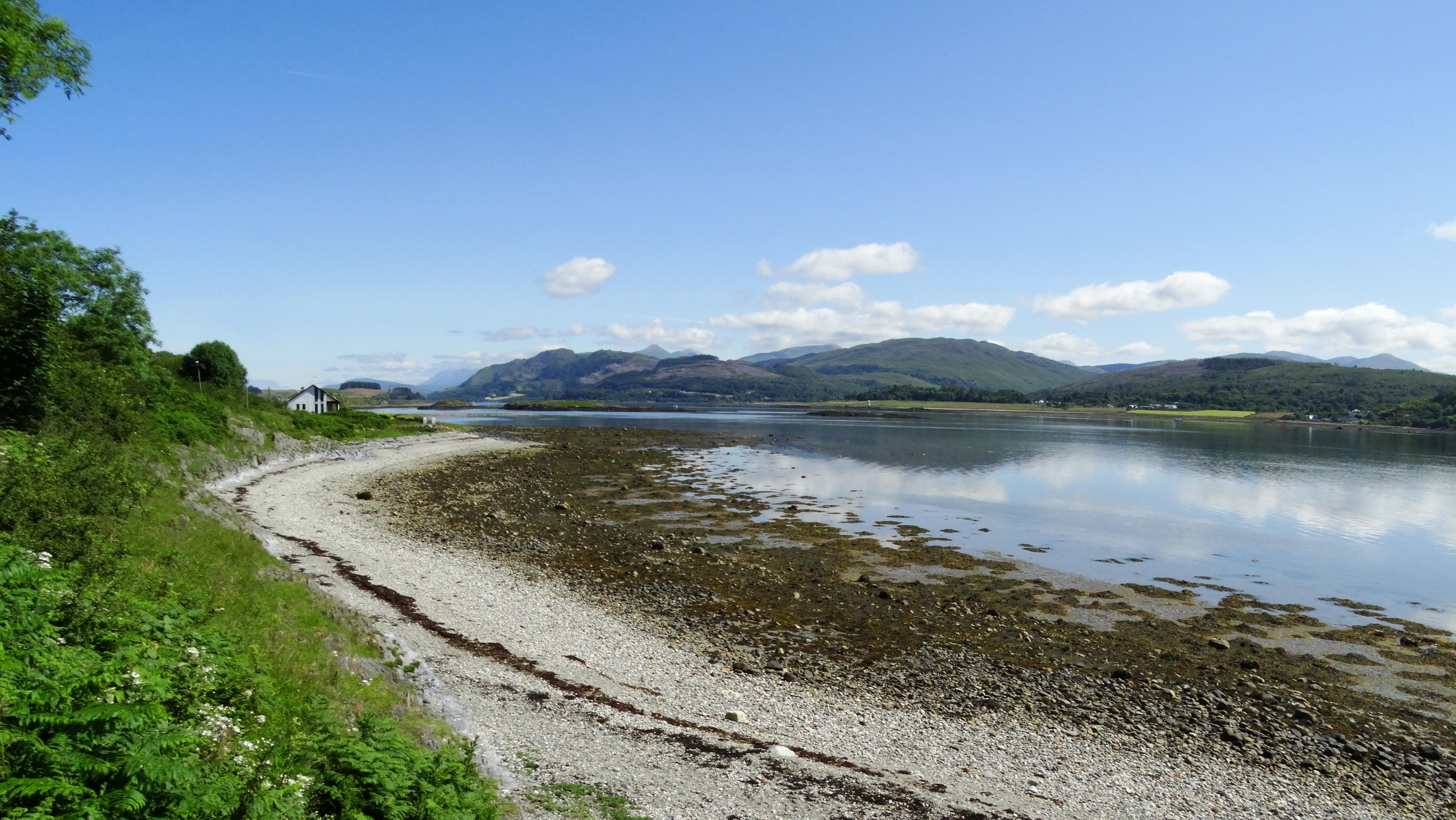
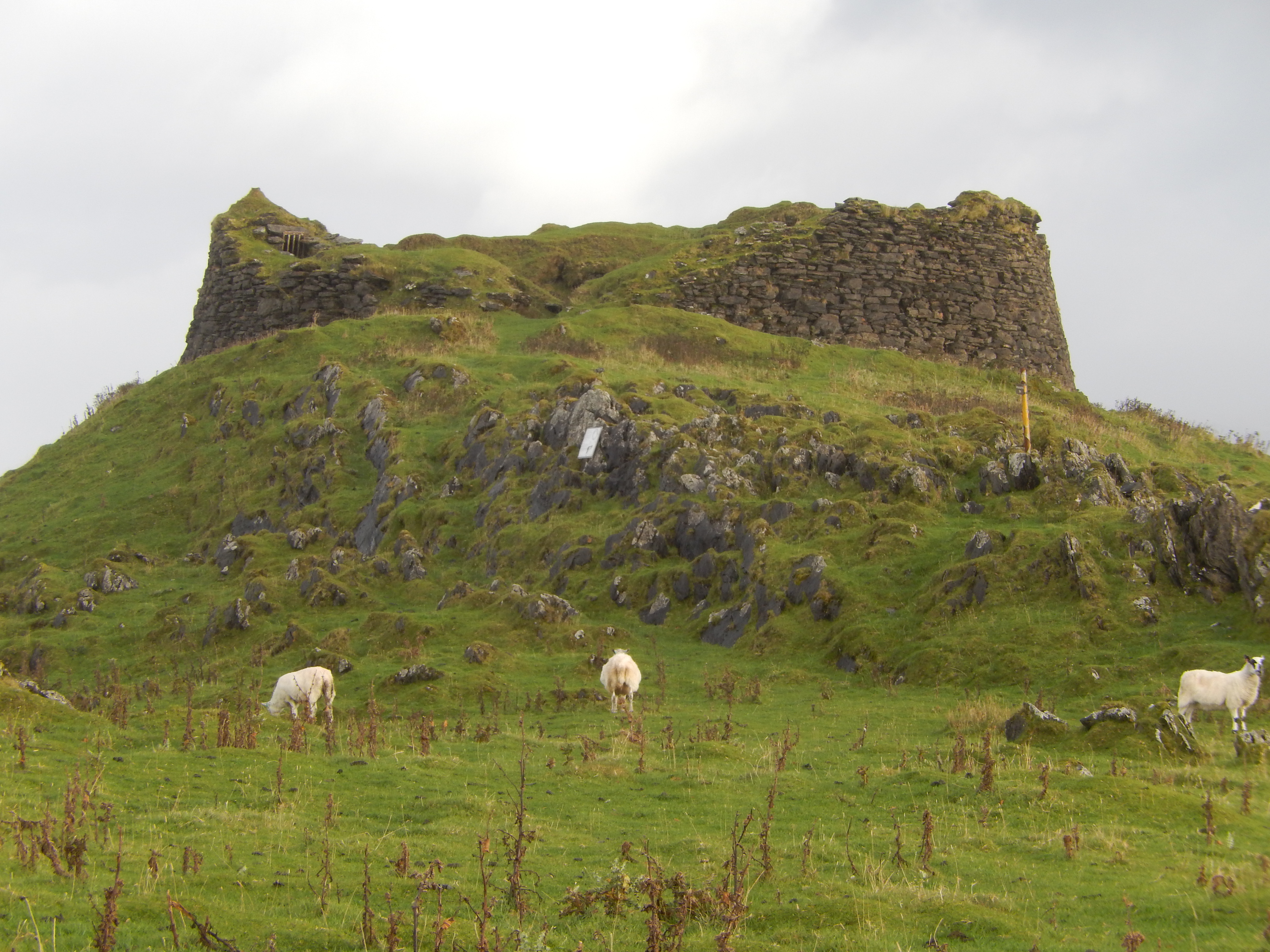
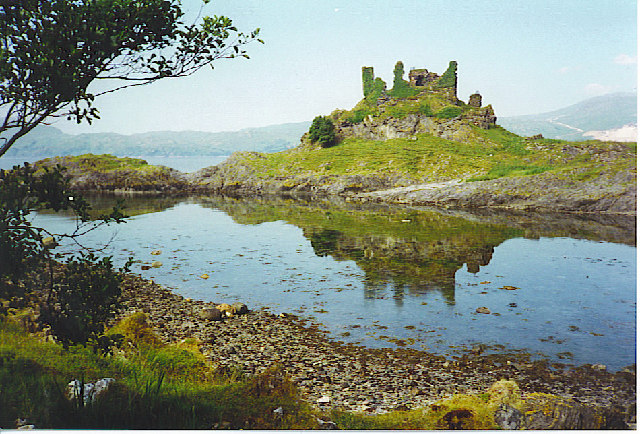
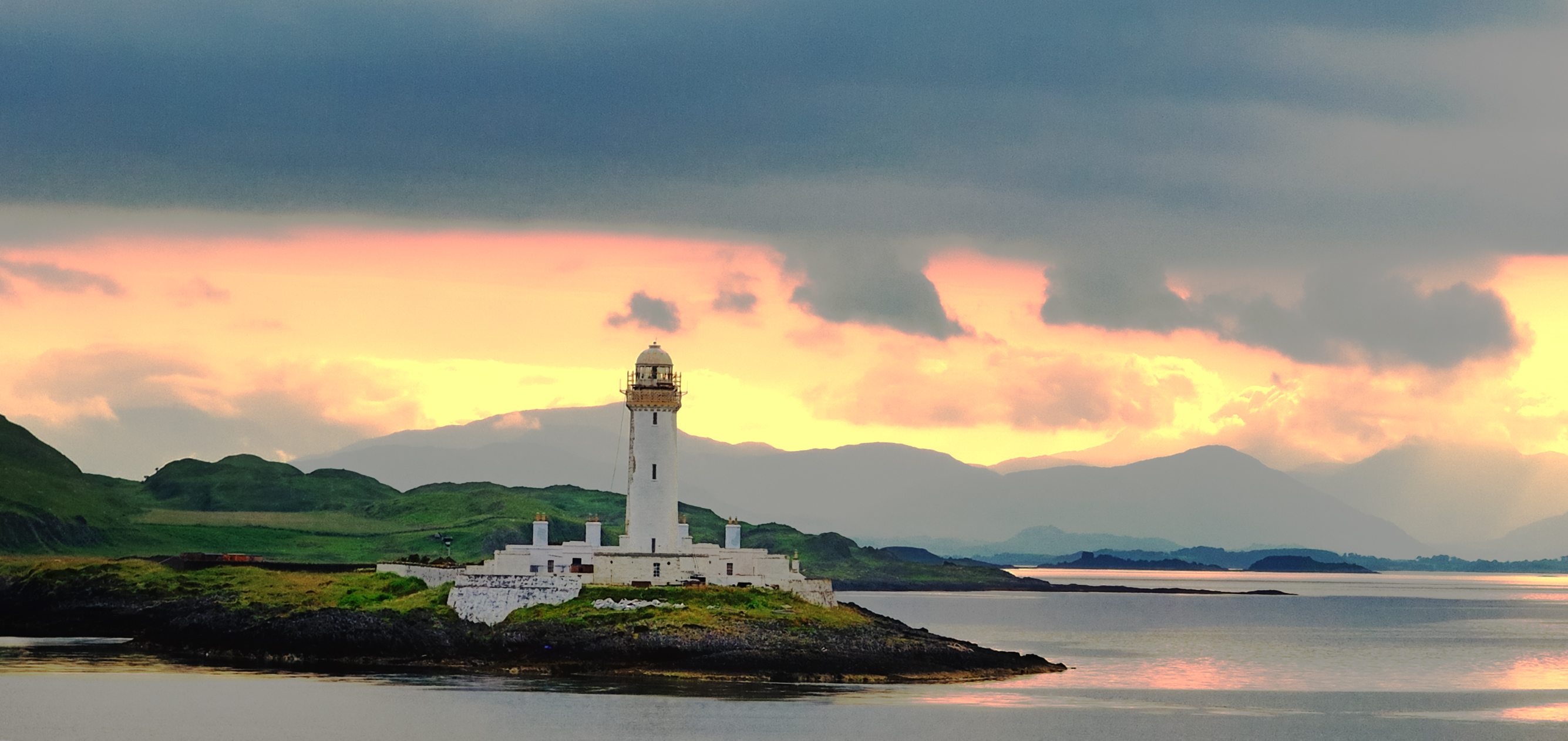
- Achnacroish Shoreline at Rubha Mòr Tirefour Broch Castle Coeffin Lismore Lighthouse

Location
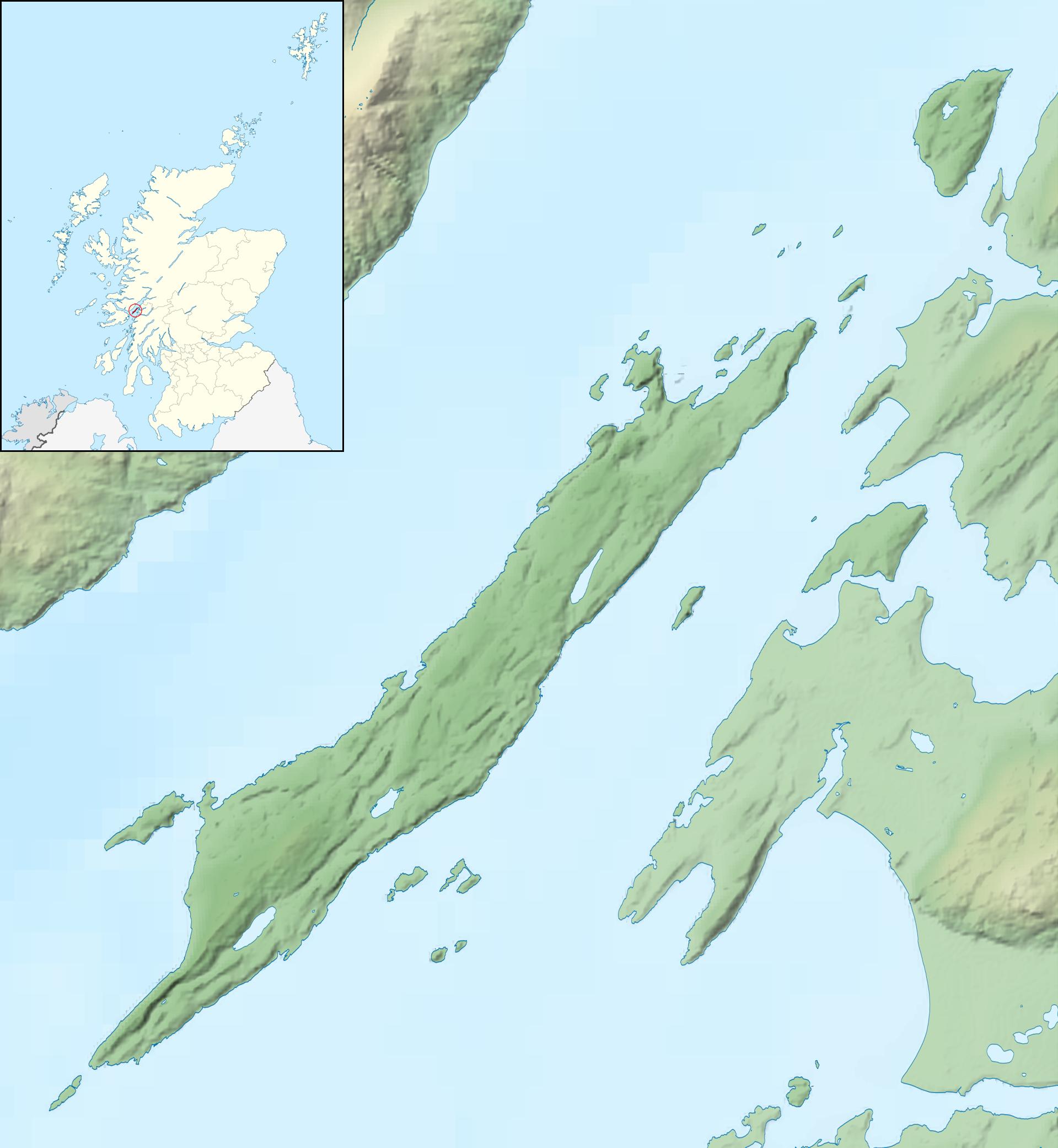
- Map of Lismore & surrounding islands Lismore shown within Argyll and Bute
- OS grid reference: NM840408
- Coordinates: 56.52°N 5.5°W

Name
- Name meaning: great garden or great enclosure

Physical geography
- Island group: Inner Hebridies
- Area: 2,351 ha (5,810 acres)
- Area rank: 33
- Highest elevation: Barr Mòr, 127 m (417 ft)

Administration
- Council area: Argyll and Bute
- Country: Scotland
- Sovereign state: United Kingdom

Demographics
- Population: 190
- Population rank: 32
- Population density: 8.1/km^{2} (21/sq mi)
- Largest settlement: Achnacroish

Lismore (Scottish Gaelic: Lios Mòr, pronounced [ʎis̪ ˈmoːɾ] possibly meaning "great enclosure" or "garden") is an island of around 2,351 hectares (9.1 square miles) in the Inner Hebrides of Scotland. It is in the council area of Argyll and Bute. The climate is damp and mild, with over 166 centimetres (65 in) of rain recorded annually. This fertile, low-lying island was once a major centre of Celtic Christianity, with a 6th-century monastery associated with Saint Moluag, and later became the seat of the medieval Bishop of Argyll. There are numerous ruined structures, including a broch and two 13th-century castles.

During the 19th century, various new industries were introduced, including lime quarrying. During the early decades of the 20th century, the population exceeded 1,000, but this was followed by a lengthy decline. Although resident numbers are now less than 200, there was a small increase from 2001 to 2011. About a third of the population were recorded as Gaelic-speaking at the former date. The modern economy is largely based on farming, fishing and tourism, and the largest settlement is Achnacroish. Various shipwrecks have been recorded in the vicinity.

== Etymology ==
In the Gaelic name, lios means "garden" or "enclosure", and mòr is simply "big" or "great", reflecting either the fertility of the island amidst mountainous surroundings, or the presence of a defined area surrounding the early monastery. One of the earliest English language references is to "Lismoir", recorded in the 16th century.

Achnacroish is from Achadh na Croise and means "the field of the cross". The other small settlements are Clachan (village with a church) and Port Ramsay, opposite Eilean Ramsay (Ramsay's isle). Most of the surrounding islets have descriptive names, such as Eilean Dubh (black island), Eilean nan Gamhna (isle of the stirks) and Pladda (flat island, from Old Norse).

== Geology ==
Lismore is formed almost wholly from rocks of the Neoproterozoic age Lismore Limestone Formation, which is ascribed to the Blair Atholl Subgroup of the Appin Group within the Dalradian sequence. There are also some minor graphitic pelites (sometimes described as 'interbedded black slate', within the formation. The limestone country rock is intruded by a handful of NE-SW aligned lamprophyre dykes of Silurian to early Devonian age associated with the Strontian Granite Complex and by large numbers of NW-SE aligned dykes of dolerite and basalt of Palaeogene age along with a rather fewer number assigned to the ‘Loch Scridain Suite.

Quaternary deposits include glacial till and peat alongside some small patches of alluvium (clay, silt, sand and gravel) which occupy lower ground. Around the margins of Lismore are modern beach deposits and raised marine deposits of clay, silt and sand, the latter being a product of varying relative sea-levels during the Holocene epoch. The whole of Scotland was subjected to glaciation during the Pleistocene epoch. A sign of this on Lismore is the presence of rock-cut platforms close to the seashore that indicate the changing sea-levels; in some areas of the northern coast, they also betray the presence of ice by the striation marks on the rocks.

== Geography ==
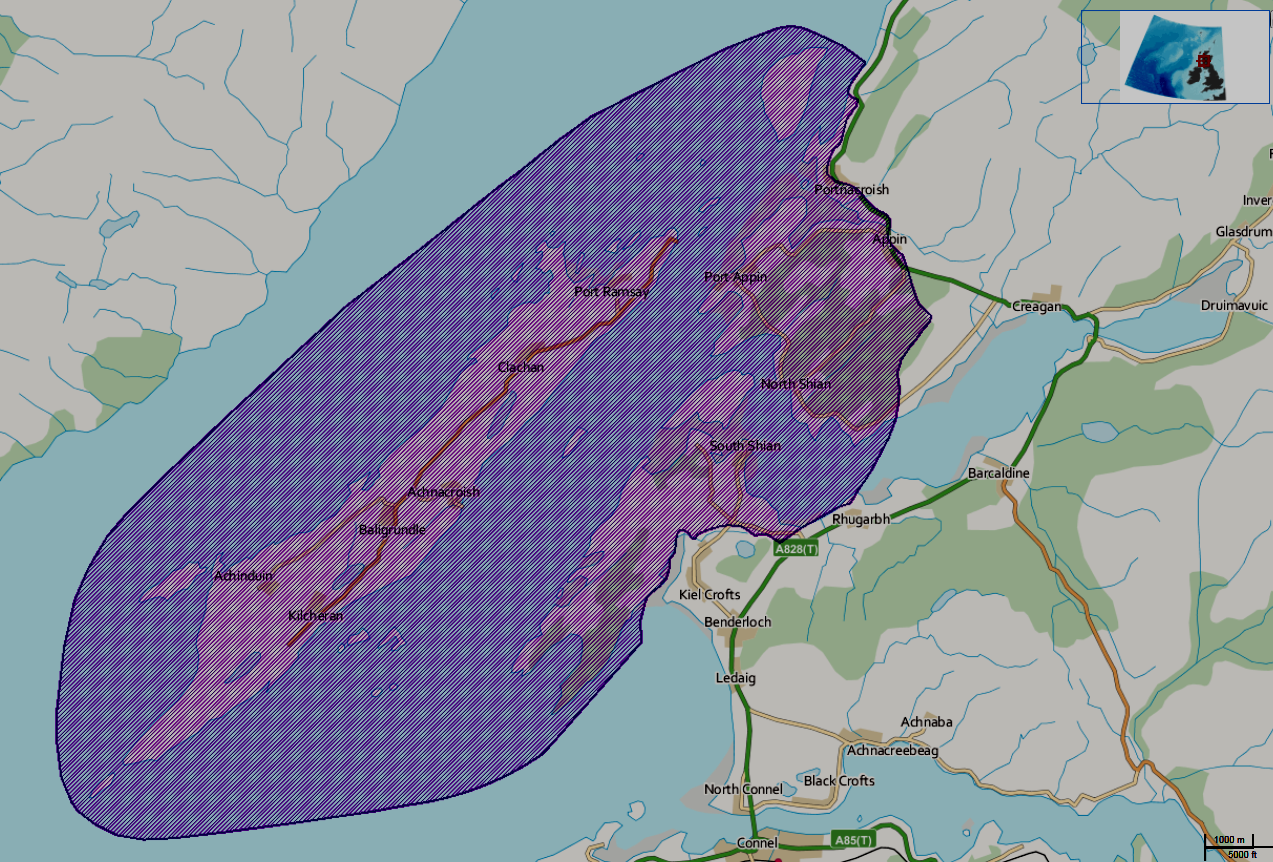
A map of the Lynn of Lorne National Scenic Area, showing Lismore at its heart.

The island of Lismore lies in Loch Linnhe, north east of Mull, in the Argyll and Bute council area. It is 15 kilometres (9.3 mi) long and about 2 kilometres (1.2 mi) wide and oriented from SW to NE, roughly parallel to the Great Glen Fault. To the east is an arm of Loch Linnhe known as the Lynn of Lorn. Composed almost entirely of limestone, Lismore has fertile soil and an abundance of trees and shrubs, including ash and sycamore. The topography consists of sheltered furrows of land between raised areas that run longitudinally up the island's spine.

The area of the island is 2,351 hectares (9.1 square miles) and the highest elevation is Barr Mòr in the south above Kilcheran, which reaches only 127 metres (417 feet). (Haswell-Smith ranks Lismore as the 50th offshore Scottish island by height).

There are several small lochs on the island, the largest of which are Loch Fiart in the southwest, Kilcheran Loch 3 kilometres (1.9 mi) further northeast, and Loch Baile a' Ghobhainn another 4 km (2.5 mi) northeast, north of Achnacroish. These three water bodies form the Lismore Lochs Special Area of Conservation, a status which is accorded as they are amongst the best examples in Scotland of lochs on a limestone substrate. The alkaline waters are very clear and low in nutrients and support the rare Chara stoneworts C. rudis and C. curtis. C. pedunculata has also been recorded. The lochs lie longitudinally down the island and are of roughly similar size. The total surface area of all three combined is about 32 hectares (79 acres), and they are inhabited by trout. (Note: Loch Baile a' Ghobhainn is 13.3 hectares (33 acres) in extent with an average depth of 11.9 metres (39 ft) and 26.8 metres (88 ft) deep at its maximum. Kilcheran Loch is 11.3 hectares (28 acres) in area and 18.2 metres (60 ft) deep and the figures for Loch Fiart are 13.3 hectares (33 acres) and 17.7 metres (58 ft) respectively.)

Lismore is part of the ancient district of Lorne and is said to lie "in the cockpit" of this territory. In the modern day, it is at the heart of the Lynn of Lorn National Scenic Area, one of forty such areas in Scotland, which have been defined so as to identify areas of exceptional scenery and to ensure its protection from inappropriate development. The national scenic areas cover 15,726 ha, of which 10,088 ha are marine seascape, and includes the whole of Lismore, along with neighbouring areas on the mainland such as Benderloch and Port Appin, and the Shuna Island.

The views from Barr Mòr, the island's highest point, are superlative. Although Barr Mòr is only of modest height, from there "the skyscape is vast and made so not by its emptiness, but by the throng of high and pointed hills lifting out of the glittering seas and islands. Nowhere else on the Highland coast can you enjoy a view of the mountainous mainland to equal this one."

The offshore islets of Eilean na Cloich and Eilean Dubh in the Lynn of Lorn and Bernera and Dubh Sgeir in the Lynn of Morvern to the west and Eilean Gainimh to the NE are extensively used by common seals and form the Eileanan agus Sgeirean Lios mòr Special Area of Conservation. The whole island of Bernera is also an SSSI, its limestone maritime cliffs being a key feature along with the presence of the nationally scarce rock whitebeam. Creag Island and Pladda are other islets in the Lynn of Lorn. Eilean nan Caorach, Inn Island, Eilean Droineach and Eilean Ramsay are amongst another cluster of small islands off the north coast, and Eilean Loch Oscair is to the NW. Lismore Lighthouse, built by Robert Stevenson, lies on the small island of Eilean Musdile to the south west, with Lady's Rock a kilometre further away in the same direction.

== Climate ==
Lismore has a maritime climate with cool summers and mild winters. The nearest official Met Office weather station for which online records are available is Dunstaffnage on the mainland north of Oban.

Climate data for Dunstaffnage 3m asl, 1971-2000 (Weather station 2.7 kilometres (2 mi) NNE of Oban)
Month	Jan	Feb	Mar	Apr	May	Jun	Jul	Aug	Sep	Oct	Nov	Dec	Year
Record high °C (°F)	13 (55)	13 (55)	15 (59)	24 (75)	25 (77)	27 (81)	27 (81)	27 (81)	24 (75)	20 (68)	15 (59)	13 (55)	27 (81)
Mean daily maximum °C (°F)	7.0 (44.6)	7.2 (45.0)	8.6 (47.5)	11.0 (51.8)	14.5 (58.1)	16.2 (61.2)	17.7 (63.9)	17.7 (63.9)	15.4 (59.7)	12.6 (54.7)	9.4 (48.9)	7.9 (46.2)	12.1 (53.8)
Mean daily minimum °C (°F)	2.1 (35.8)	2.2 (36.0)	3.0 (37.4)	4.2 (39.6)	6.6 (43.9)	8.8 (47.8)	10.9 (51.6)	10.9 (51.6)	9.3 (48.7)	7.3 (45.1)	4.3 (39.7)	3.0 (37.4)	6.1 (43.0)
Record low °C (°F)	−8 (18)	−7 (19)	−7 (19)	−2 (28)	0 (32)	2 (36)	5 (41)	3 (37)	1 (34)	−1 (30)	−6 (21)	−8 (18)	−8 (18)
Average precipitation mm (inches)	192.2 (7.57)	139.5 (5.49)	153.2 (6.03)	80.1 (3.15)	67.0 (2.64)	82.6 (3.25)	102.4 (4.03)	119.2 (4.69)	163.3 (6.43)	186.9 (7.36)	182.1 (7.17)	192.4 (7.57)	1,660.9 (65.39)
Average precipitation days (≥ mm)	27	23	28	24	23	26	24	26	27	28	27	27	310
Average rainy days (≥ mm)	25	21	27	24	23	26	24	26	27	28	27	27	305
Average snowy days (≥ cm)	7	6	5	1	0	0	0	0	0	0	1	3	23
Mean monthly sunshine hours	33.5	59.6	86.2	145.8	189.7	174.9	142.6	141.7	97.5	75.6	46.2	30.7	1,224
Source 1: Met Office
Source 2: Weatherbase

== Prehistory ==
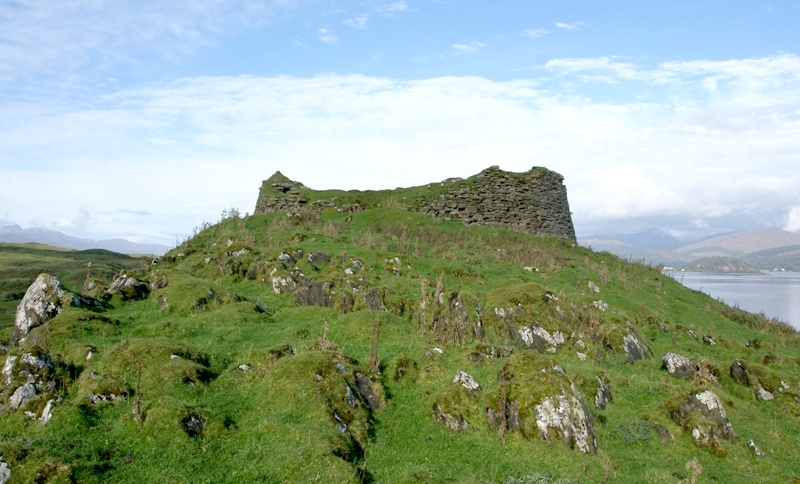
The broch at Tirefour

There are various Bronze Age cairns on the island. Tirefour Castle is an Iron Age broch of an uncertain date that is a prominent landmark on Lismore's east coast. The walls have an average thickness of 4.5 metres (15 ft), enclosing a circular court about 12.2 metres (40 ft) in diameter. The wall still stands 3 metres (9.8 ft) high and reaches 4.9 metres (16 ft) in the south east. There is a second possible broch site at An Dùn, SW of Loch Fiart, and these are amongst the most southerly examples of these enigmatic fortifications. There are also various duns on the island that may date to the 1st or 2nd centuries AD.

== History ==
=== Early Christianity and Scandinavian influence ===
Lismore was an important centre of Celtic Christianity from an early date. The Iona Chronicle records the death of Mo-Luóc (also known as Moluag), who was probably abbot of the Lismore monastery in 594, and of his successors Neman in 613 and Eochaid in 637. There is, however, no reason to suppose that this was a daughter house of Columba's abbey on Iona itself. Lismore probably maintained its status as the principal religious house of the Cenél Loairn during the remainder of the 7th century and the deaths of abbots Iarnlaigh c. 700, Colmán in 704 and Crónán ua Eoain in 718 are recorded in the Annals of Ulster. Five further such obituaries are recorded in the latter half of the 8th century.

Lismore was part of the kingdom of Dalriada in the 6th century and probably thereafter until the arrival of the Vikings in the late 8th century, after which it is likely the island was absorbed into the Norse-Gael Kingdom of the Isles. Magnus Barelegs had established direct Norwegian overlordship over this sprawling sea kingdom by 1098. In that year, Edgar of Scotland signed a treaty with Magnus which settled much of the boundary between the Scots and Norwegian claims in these islands. Edgar formally acknowledged the existing situation by giving up his claims to the Hebrides but there were a few exceptions including Luing and Lismore, which were retained by the Scots.

=== Medieval period ===
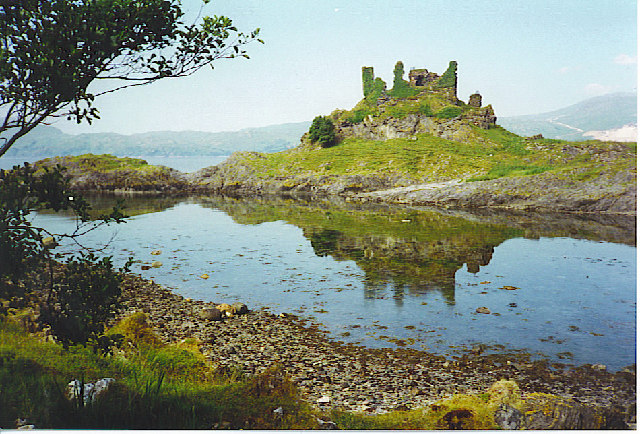
Castle Coeffin

Lismore later became the seat of the medieval Bishopric of Argyll. Before the late 12th century the Bishopric of Dunkeld included all of Argyll, but sometime between 1183 and 1193 they were separated, as apparently the then Bishop John Scotus was unable to speak Gaelic. Lismore became the seat of the new bishop, and he and his successors were known as Episcopi Lismorenses but a papal mandate in 1249 proposed that the seat be transferred to "some more secure and accessible place". At least by 1268, Laurence de Ergadia became Bishop of Argyll and served in that position until his death in 1299.

In the event St Moluag's cathedral at Clachan maintained its position until 1507, when the diocese's centre was moved to Saddell in Kintyre. It was burned down during the Reformation and only the choir survives in greatly altered form, the nave and western tower having been reduced to their foundations. There is also evidence of an enclosure, probably medieval.

The ruins of Coeffin Castle stand on the summit of a rocky promontory on the coast west of Clachan. There is the outline of an oblong hall-house, which may be 13th century, and an irregularly shaped bailey, likely of a later date. A tidal fish trap, of unknown age, is located in the small bay to the south-east of the castle. To the north-east of the castle are the remains of a stone-walled fort.

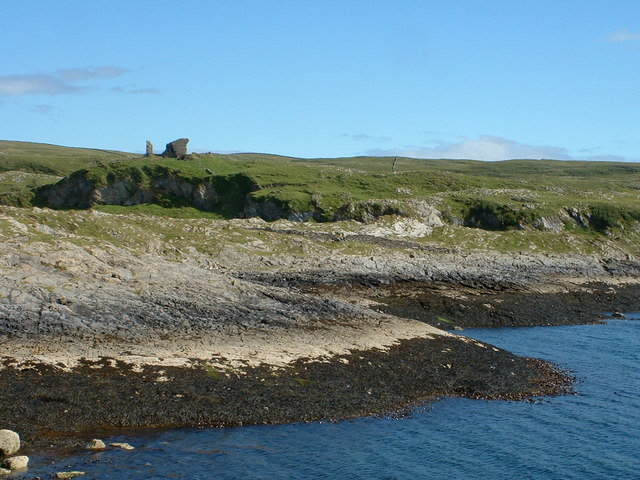
Achanduin Castle as seen from Bernera Bay

The remains of Achanduin Castle west of Achnacroish is also thought to date back to the 13th century. Built by the MacDougalls around 1290, who held it throughout the 14th century, the castle is then thought to have been held by the Bishops of Argyll until the mid 16th century. The castle overlooks the island of Bernera.

In the 16th century Donald Monro provided a short description of the island in Scots: Lismoir, ane iyle quher leid ure is, fornent Douard. This iyle is four myle lang, with ane paroche kirke in it. ("Lismore, an isle where lead ore is, opposite Duart. This isle is four miles long, with a parish church on it".) (Note: This quotation is from the Balfour manuscript quoted in the 1774 Auld edition. Monro's work was first published in Latin in 1582. It forms 11 short "chapters" of George Buchanan's Rerum Scoticarum Historia with all of the islands listed, although with much omission of the details. In this version the description is: "Lismore, eight miles long and two broad, which was formerly the seat of the bishop of Argyle, and in which besides the productions common to others, metals have been found". In the Sibbald version of 1682, which R.W. Munro preferred as the main basis for his 1961 book on the topic, "Lismoir" is "ane fair mane Ile 8 myle lang from the north-eist to the south-west, 2 myle braid with ane paroche kirk quhilk sumtime was the cathedral kirk seat of the Bischop of Argyle, inhabite and manurit with ane castell callit Achaadn or Bell buachier, all full of lyme stanes and mettal and leid ovir lyand foiranent Doward".) Monro's Description of the Western Isles of Scotland also mentions Eilean Droineach and Eilean Ramsay. He stated that both were "good for corn and store" and had many "Elders and thorns" and that Eilean Droineach was the "habitation of Bishops and Nobles in auld times". However, the view of Munro (1961) is that this last comment more properly applies to the larger "Ramsay Isle".

Lismore is the home of the Clan MacLea, who claim kinship with the Livingstone family, and who were recognised by the Lord Lyon in 2002. The Plod nam Baran, which is adjacent to the site of Saint Moluag's church, may be the burial ground of its clan chiefs, or "barons". The current chief, Niall Livingstone of Bachuil, is the "Coarb of Saint Moluag" and since the 16th century or earlier, the chiefs have been hereditary keepers of the saint's crozier or pastoral staff known as the Bachuil Mòr.

=== 18th to 20th centuries ===
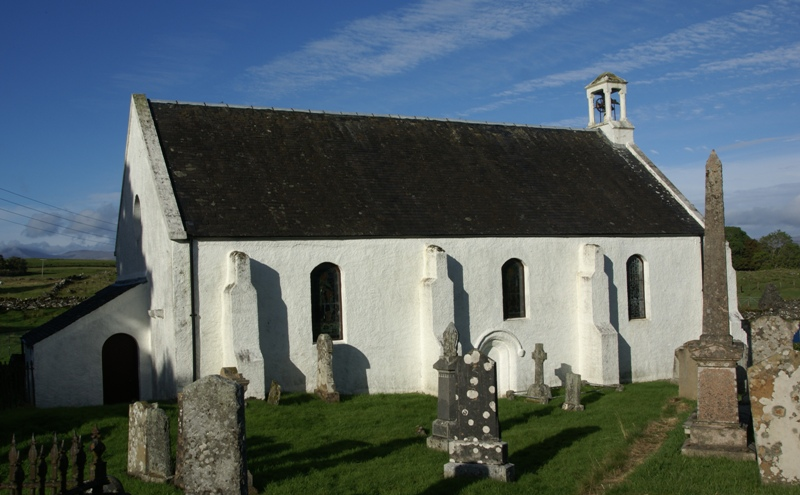
Lismore Parish Church

In 1707, the Acts of Union merged England and Scotland, and Lismore became part of the Kingdom of Great Britain. Thereafter taxes on whisky distillation rose dramatically, and much of Scotland's distillation was either shut down or forced underground until the 1823 Excise Act provided a legal framework for the industry. The remains of at least two illicit stills from this period have been found on Lismore.

In 1749 the ruins of the old cathedral were trimmed down from their remaining height, given a roof and turned into a parish church with a bell tower.

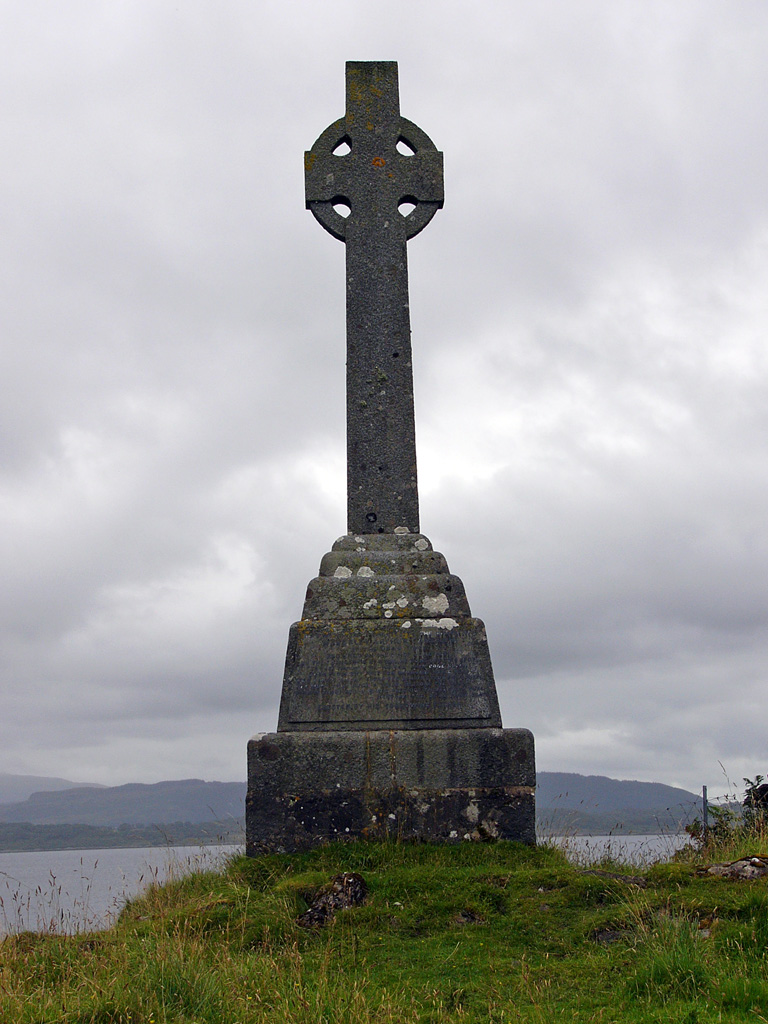
Celtic cross memorial to Waverley Arthur Cameron

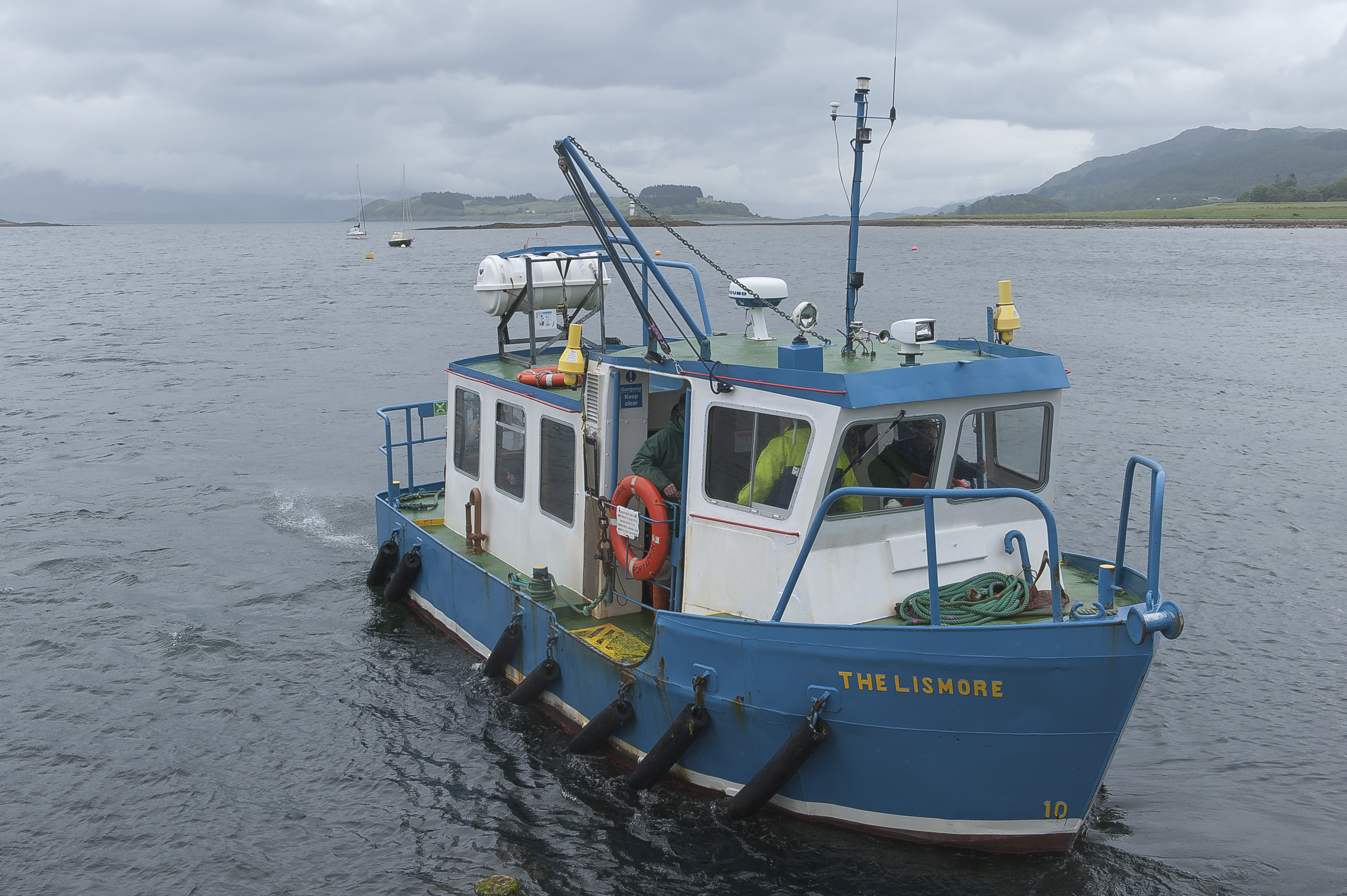
Former Lismore ferry boat

In the 19th century lime was quarried, particularly on the west coast. The ruined remains of the quarriers' cottages can still be seen on Eilean nan Caorach and Inn Island, and old lime kilns can be seen at Sailean, Port na Moralachd and Port Ramsay; the last lime was produced in 1934. The remains of another two kilns can be seen at Kilcheran near Lismore Seminary, a Roman Catholic divinity school that was in operation from 1803 to 1828 at a time when the other inhabitants of the island were staunchly Presbyterian.

John Stuart McCaig, the architect of McCaig's Tower in Oban, was born on Lismore in the 19th century as was the folklorist Alexander Carmichael. Overlooking Lismore Bay is a Celtic Cross, a memorial to Waverley Arthur Cameron, the son of Duncan Cameron, inventor of the "Waverley" nib pen and the owner of The Oban Times newspaper. Waverley was drowned in 1891 when his yacht foundered off the coast nearby.

There have been various other shipwrecks in the vicinity. In 1889 the paddle steamer Mountaineer lived up to its name by clambering onto Lady's Rock, the damage to which was still visible in 1995. In 1905 the MacBrayne steamship Clydesdale hit the same obstruction in a Force 6 wind. The harbour patrol craft Appletree was sunk in a collision with an RAF pinnace east of the Lismore light in October 1940 with, according to one report, the loss of two lives. The trawler MFV Solway Firth foundered south of this position in 1977.

Lismore, like other Hebridean islands, has suffered from depopulation since the 19th century, in large part due to the Clearances. In 1798 there were 900 people living on the island and 1399 by 1841. Over the next 40 years the population more than halved to 621. By 1961 there were only 155 residents, and by the time of the 1991 census there were just 140. There are various examples of abandoned townships, such as Coille nam Bard. In the 2001 census, the population had risen slightly to 146, over 45% of whom were over 60 years old, making it the Scottish island with the oldest population.

=== Fishing ===
The Annual Reports of the Fishery Board for Scotland provide an insight into the state of fishing from Lismore in the years before the First World War. The catch typically consisted of saithe.

Fishery Statistics

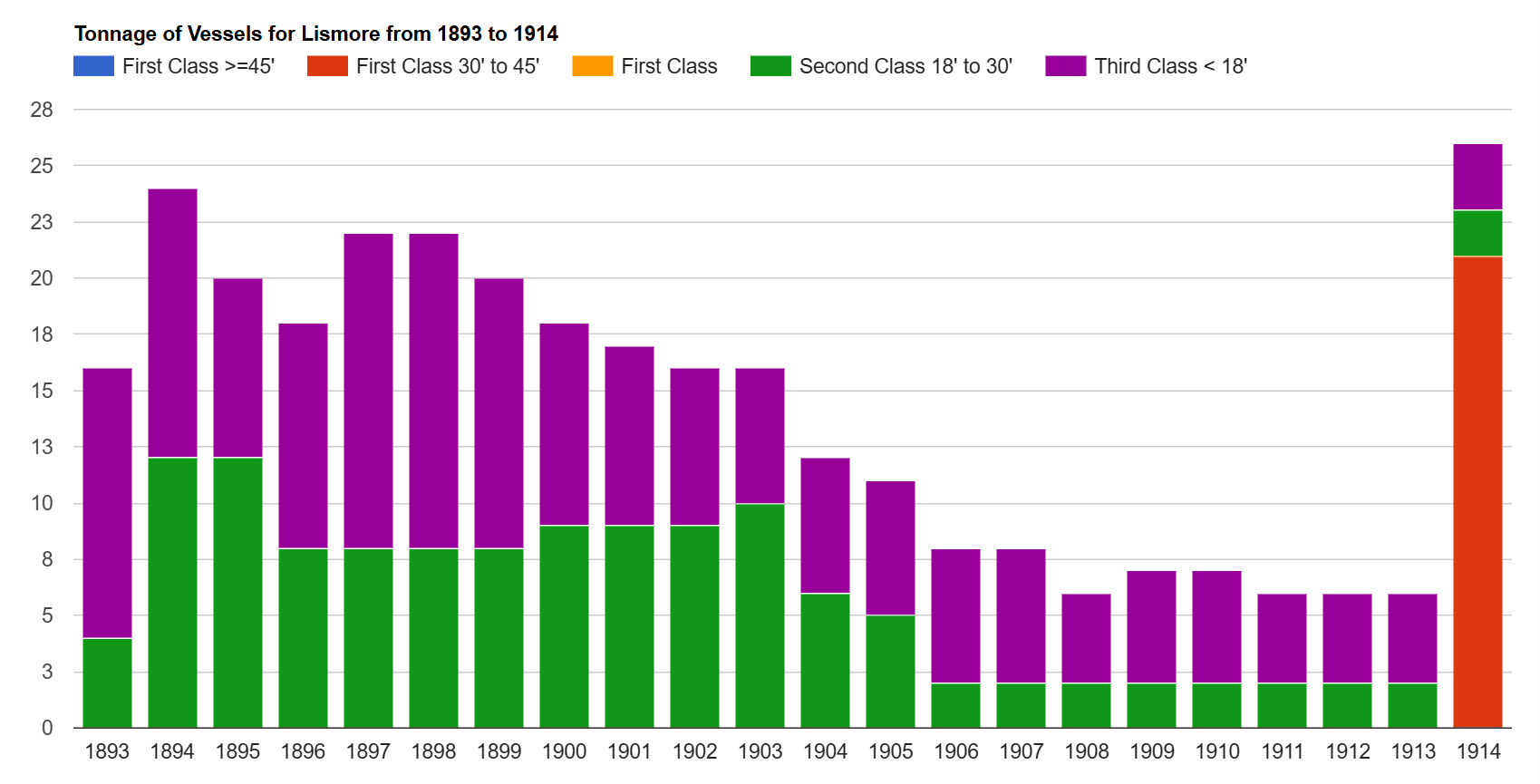
Tonnage of vessels

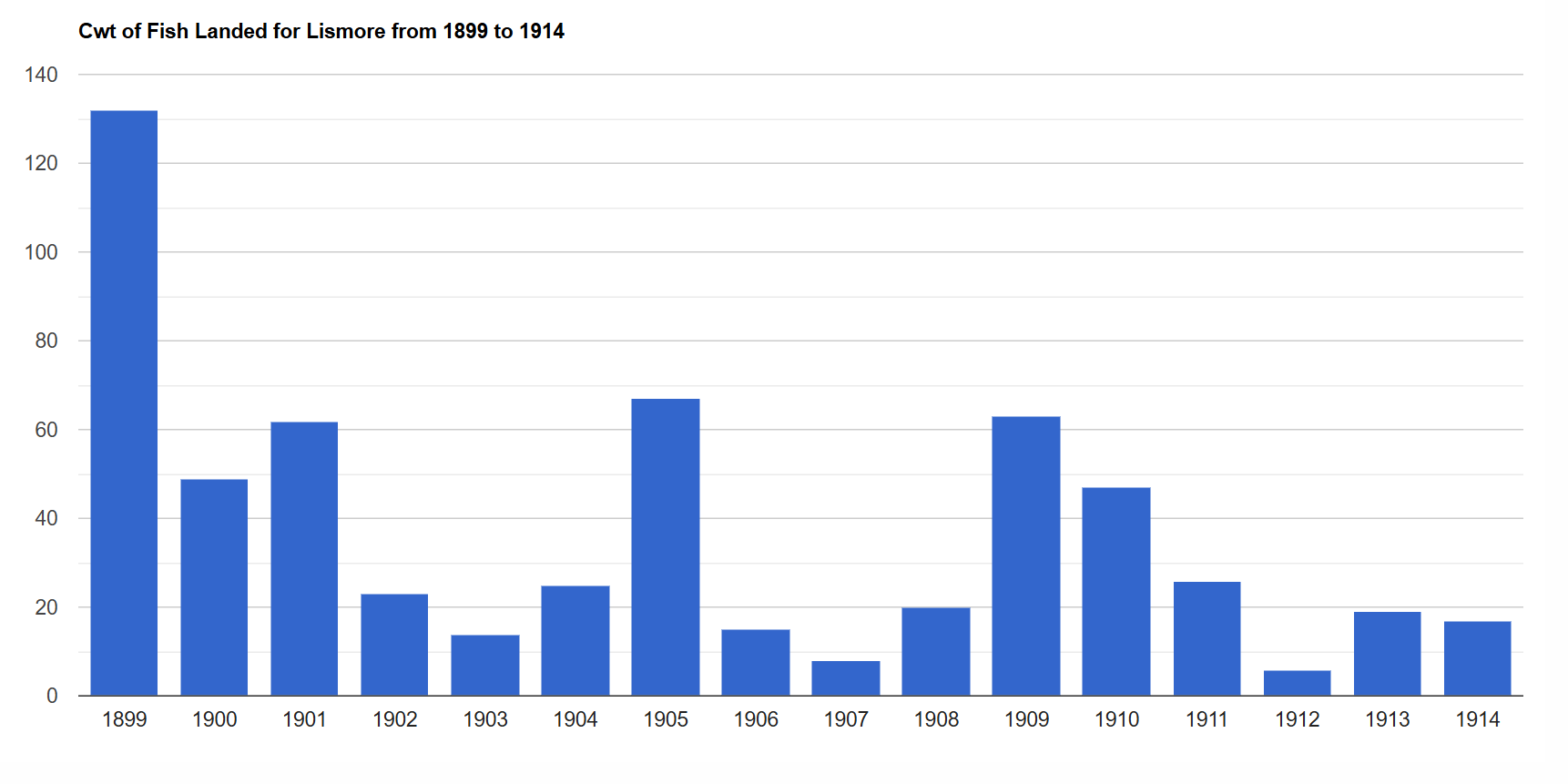
Cwt of fish landed

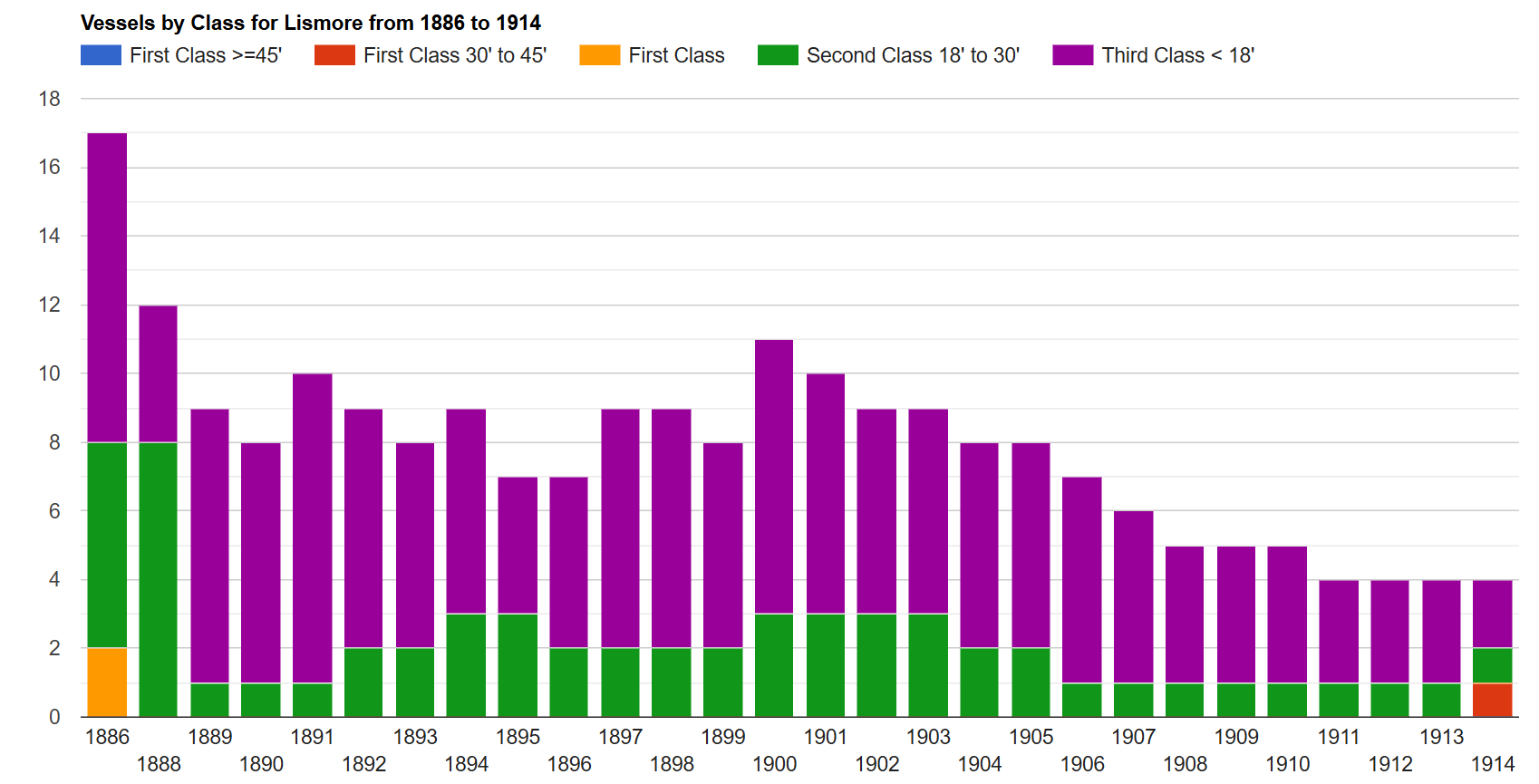
Vessels by class

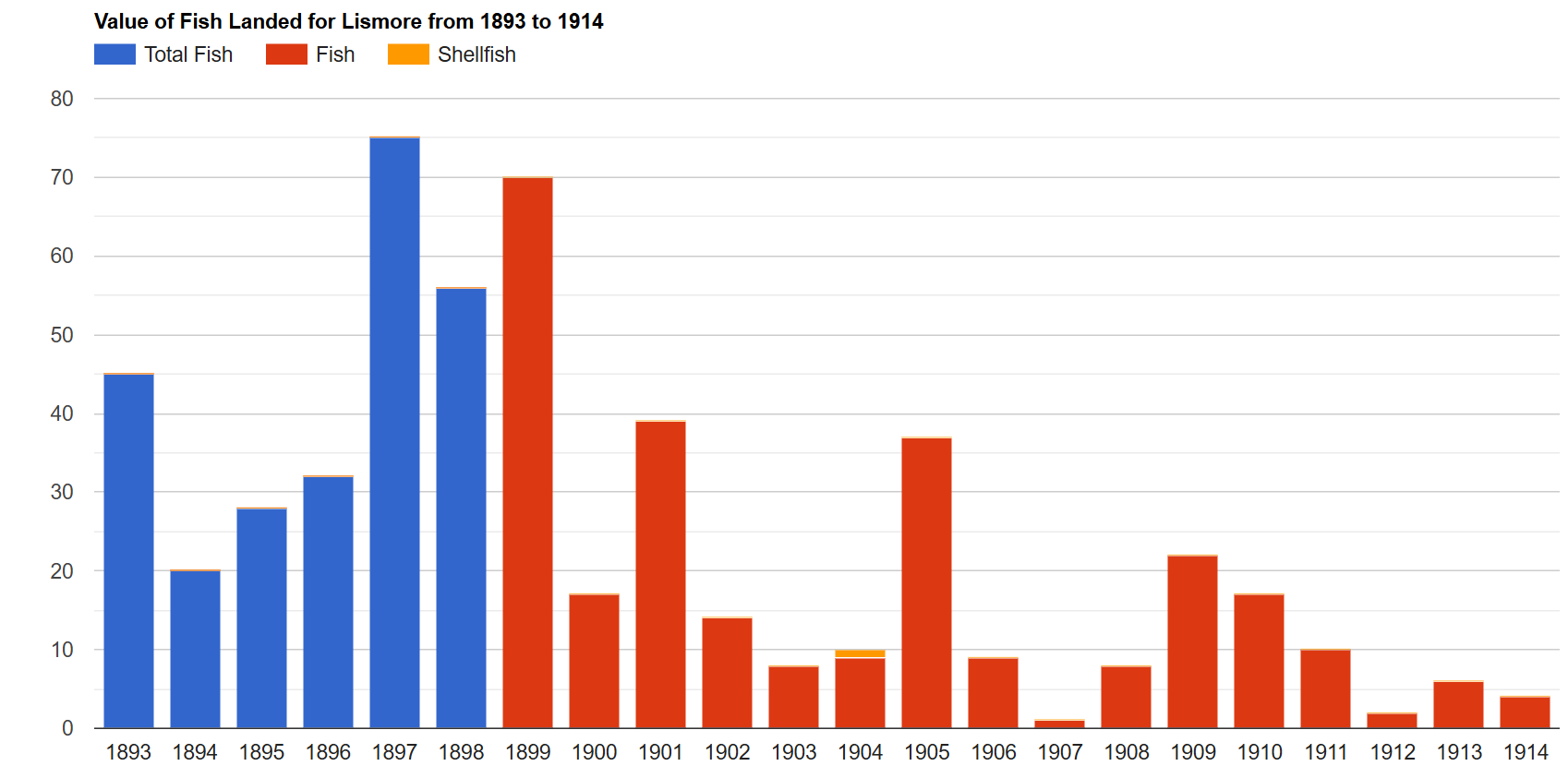
Value (£) of fish landed

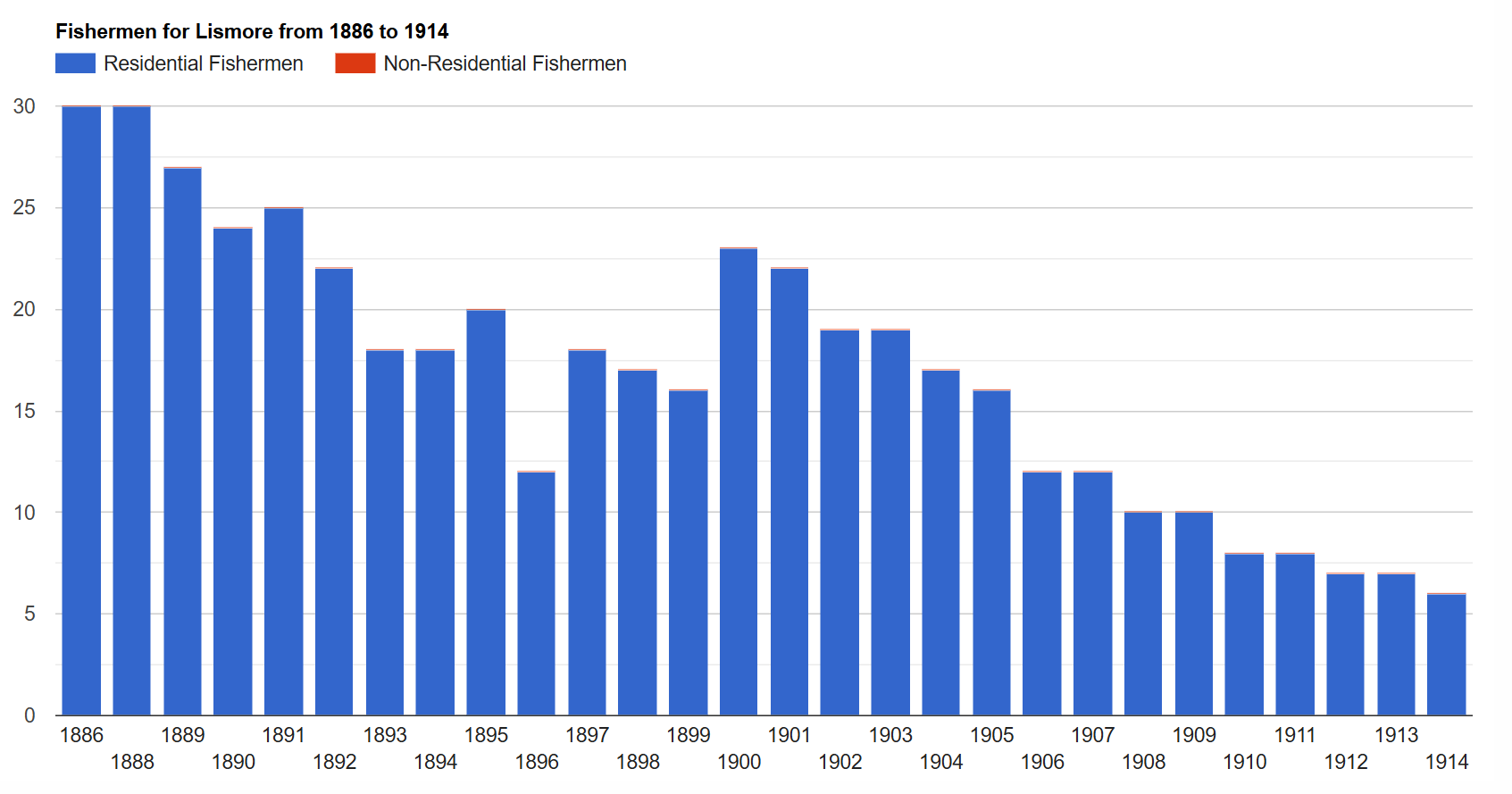
Fishermen

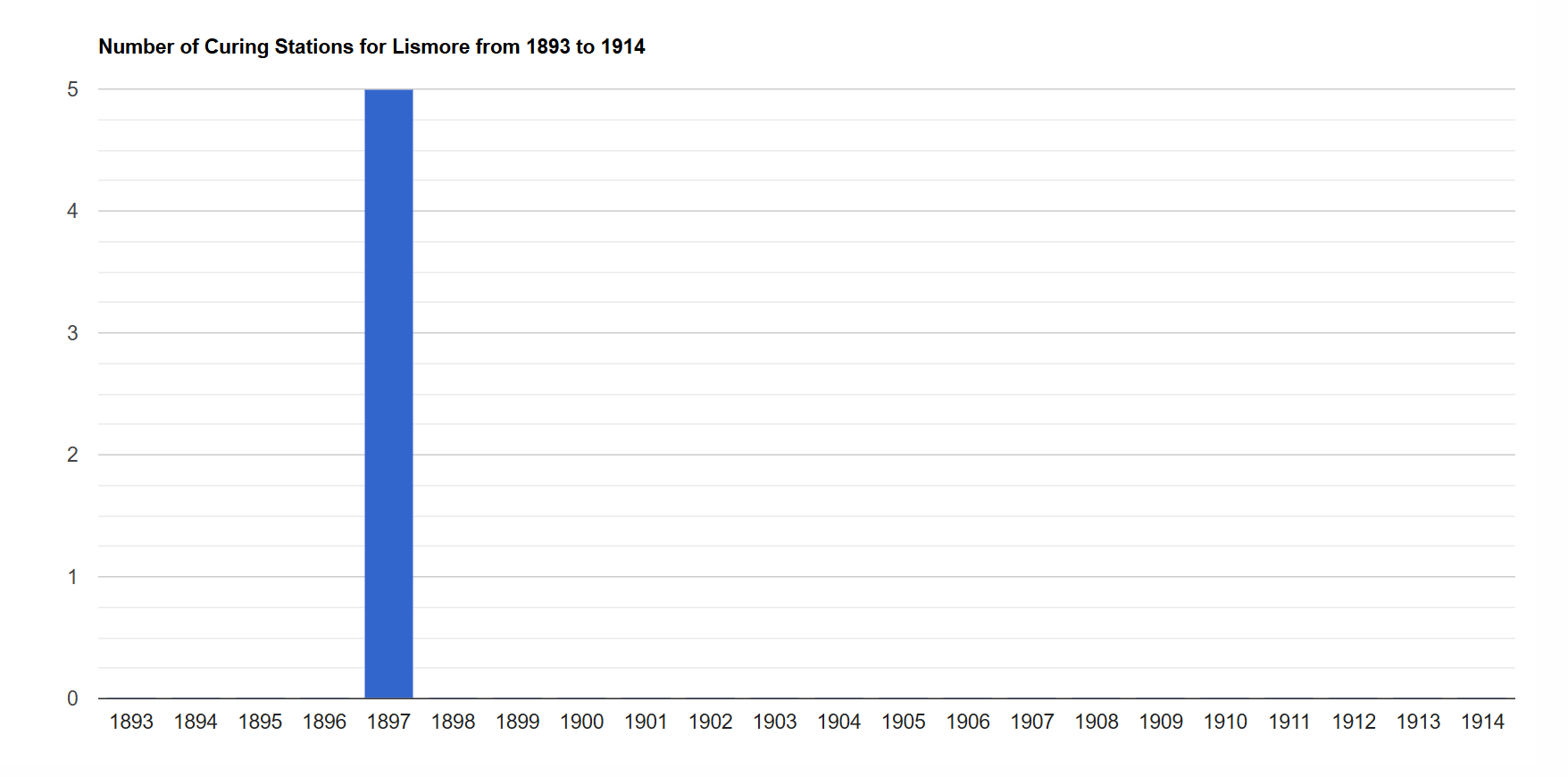
Number of curing stations

== Present day ==
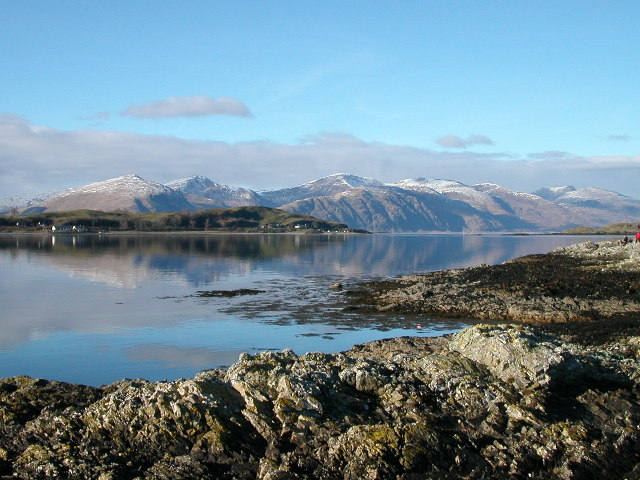
North Lismore from Port Appin with the hills of Kingairloch beyond

The island's population was recorded as 192 at the 2011 census, an increase of over 30% since 2001. In 2022 the resident population was recorded as 190. The majority of the island's working population are engaged in farming or fishing, and sheep raised on the island have a reputation for quality. Majority of the land is owner occupied.

Prior to 2007 there was no mains supply of drinking water on the island, water being supplied instead from wells and springs. In that year the then Scottish Executive announced plans for a mains supply to be provided at a cost of £1 million: a pipe was laid under Loch Linnhe and work was to begin on laying about 10 kilometres (6 mi) of pipes across Lismore. However, Scottish Water later decided to supply water from boreholes instead.

The island is linked to the mainland by two ferries: a Caledonian MacBrayne vehicle ferry making the crossing to Oban and a council passenger ferry making the shorter crossing from Point, at the north-eastern tip of the island, to Port Appin. The B8045 is the main road on the island, which it traverses from beyond Kilcheran in the SW, to Point in the NE.

Facilities on Lismore include a shop which is also a post office, and a café. Bicycles may be hired at Point. Explore Lismore provide Land Rover Tours and the island's only taxi service. There is no petrol filling station. In 2001 29% of the population of the island spoke Gaelic and maintaining this heritage is one of the aims of the Comann Eachdraidh Lios Mòr, the Lismore Gaelic Heritage Centre.

Lismore is part of the multi-member ward of Oban, Lorn and the Isles in the Argyll and Bute council area. The island is represented by Jenni Minto of the SNP at the Holyrood Parliament in Edinburgh who was elected for the Argyll and Bute constituency in 2011, and by Brendan O'Hara of the SNP at the Westminster parliament in London.

In 2023, the sole shop on the island, which is also the post office, was threatened with closure because the person running it had decided to return to school teaching. The Lismore Community Trust, a local charitable organisation, organised a campaign to keep it open, and with the help of residents, holiday home owners and tourists raised more than their target of £70,000 to do so.

== Myths and culture ==
"The Piper's Cave" is a local story about a piper and his dog. According to Alexander Carmichael, the piper entered the Uamh-Chraidh (the "cave of pain") and intended to exit through the Uamh-an-duine (the "cave of the man"). The sounds of his bagpipes could be heard throughout the island. When the piping ceased the dog emerged sightless and hairless but the piper was presumed to have drowned in one of the cave's impassable pools and was never seen again. His lament is recorded as:

Mis air airin baidh 'us burrail I was drowning and howling
Measg nan glumag eagalaich Amongst the horrid pools

Another story has St Moluag and St Mulhac conducting a boat race across the Lynn of Lorn with the first to land on Lismore having the right to found a monastery there. Realising that he was going to lose, Moluag cut off his finger and threw it ashore north of the broch of Tirefour, enabling him to claim victory.

The Book of the Dean of Lismore was compiled by the titular dean, James MacGregor, in the 15th century. Held in the National Library of Scotland, it is "one of the greatest treasures" of early Gaelic writing. However it was written in Fortingall, Perthshire and its connection with Lismore itself, if any, is uncertain. (Note: Haswell-Smith states that the manuscript was compiled on Lismore although it is clear that the National Library, where the book is displayed, believe it was written in Perthshire.)

== See also ==
- List of islands of Scotland
