= Puck's Glen =

Glen in Argyll and Bute, Scotland

- Location within Argyll and Bute

Geography
- Location: Cowal, Argyll and Bute, Scotland
- Coordinates: 56.013207°N 4.961069°W
- River: Eas Mòr burn
- Interactive map of Puck's Glen
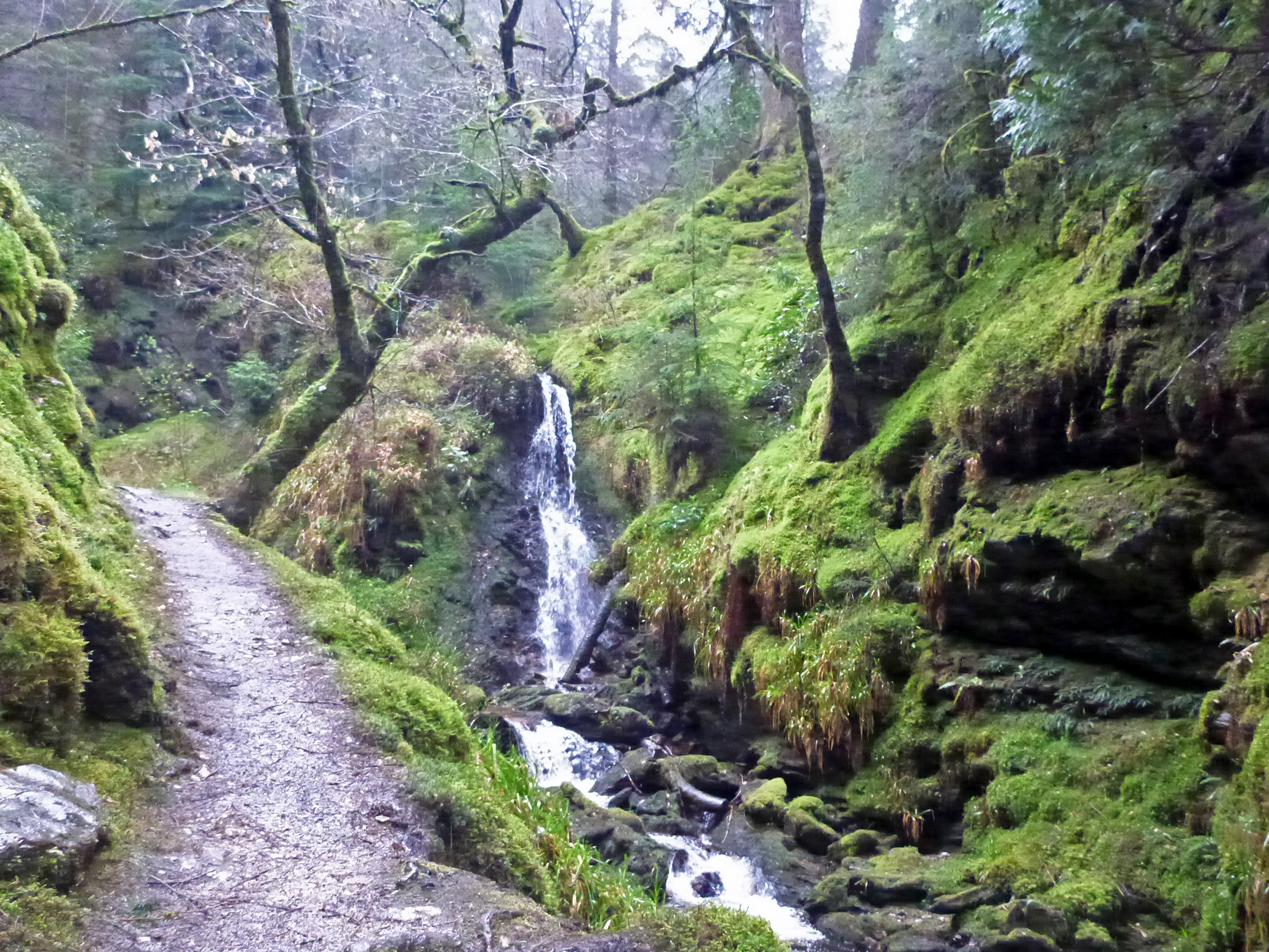
- Puck's Glen: path up ravine, with waterfalls

Puck's Glen Gorge Trail
- Length: 2.8 km (1.7 mi)
- Location: Argyll Forest Park
- Established: 1870
- Trailheads: Puck's Glen car park
- Use: hiking
- Elevation change: 126 m (413 ft)
- Difficulty: strenuous
- Season: all, best after rain
- Waymark: red colour
- Sights: continuous series of waterfalls
- Hazards: wet path, unprotected drops
- Maintainer: Forestry and Land Scotland
- Website: https://forestryandland.gov.scot/

Puck's Glen is a river-formed ravine on the Cowal Peninsula, in Argyll and Bute, west of Scotland, with a popular scenic walking trail beside the Eas Mòr stream (Gaelic for "big waterfall"). In 2020 the glen and adjoining trails were closed temporarily due to COVID-19 restrictions, issues of stability of the gorge, and felling of trees infected by larch disease.

It comes under Forestry and Land Scotland which has highlighted it as a feature of the Argyll Forest Park (itself within the Loch Lomond and The Trossachs National Park), and described it as "One of the most magical forests in Scotland, with a delightful trail along a rocky gorge."

The stream tumbles down a series of waterfalls and rapids, joining the River Eachaig about 1.2 kilometres (0.75 mi) south of the entrance to the Benmore Botanic Garden. A car park off the A815 road (about 10 kilometres (6.2 mi) from Dunoon on the road to Loch Eck) gives access by a track to the foot of the glen path, as well as forest paths giving an alternative route to the top of the glen.

== History ==
The Benmore Estate, previously hunting grounds of the Campbells of Ballochyle, was improved by a succession of owners in the 19th century. Forestry plantation began in the 1820s, and extensive garden improvements were made from 1862 by James Piers Patrick. The Ordnance Survey from 1865 shows the Eas Mòr gorge extending uphill through a small area of woodland into open moorland with some trees in the ravine.

=== Benmore Estate ===
In 1870 the Greenock sugar refiner and philanthropist James Duncan bought the estate, and added the adjacent Kilmun and Bernice Estates. He arranged extensive plantings, including more than six million trees around the estate, and added paths leading up the Eas Mòr gorge for his visitors to enjoy the magical atmosphere of the glen, reminiscent of the mythological Puck, the character Puck in William Shakespeare's play A Midsummer Night's Dream.

The Ordnance Survey map as revised in 1898 shows paths and bridges up the Eas Mòr gorge; the coniferous plantation of Uig Wood extends on each side.

Henry Younger of the Edinburgh brewer Younger's bought the estate in 1889, and with his son Harry George Younger made many improvements to the woods and gardens.

Two strips of Japanese larch planted at Puck's Glen around 1903 were successfully established by 1912, though European larch had failed in the locality. In 1918, the Anchor Line Staff Magazine noted that Benmore House was celebrated for "Puck's Glen with its amber stream cutting a channel through moss-draped schistose rock, and tumbling from one silver rock-chalice to another."

=== Forestry Commission ===
In 1924, Harry George Younger presented the estates to the Forestry Commissioners. The Royal Scottish Arboricultural Society made a visit in July 1925, and described Puck's Glen as "a striking example of how man, working hand in hand with nature, has made what was once a bare hillside ravine into one of the most lovely walks imaginable." Starting near the sixth milestone from Dunoon on the old main road to Arrochar, the bridle-path "by the stream which the Ordnance Survey map calls the Eas Mor, but which is better known as Puck's Burn" was soon hemmed in by steep banks, "while growing on their slopes are conifers of a dozen or more varieties, rhododendrons, and many of the rarer species of ferns. The path follows the stream through the whole course of the ravine".

In commemoration of the improvements James Duncan had made to the estate, Younger provided the Bayley Balfour Memorial Hut above the glen, dedicated to the memory of the botanist Sir Isaac Bayley Balfour. The hut was designed by Sir Robert Lorimer with wood panelling featuring all the varieties of timber grown at Benmore, and positioned above the tree-tops. The dedication ceremony in September 1928 enjoyed fine weather; The Gardeners' Chronicle described its site as commanding "beautiful views above a gorge where 'the singing waters fall to the Eachaig River from lofty heights' " amidst towering woods, with Beinn Mhòr visible through a faint blue haze.

In 1929 the Royal Botanic Garden Edinburgh opened the Younger Botanic Garden in the Benmore estate as its first outstation, and in the 1930s the Forestry Commission established Kilmun Arboretum to the south of Puck's Glen, planting large groups of tree species rather than individual specimens

The Forestry Commission's Scottish National Forest Park Guide, issued in 1947, calls Puck's Glen "a rocky cleft beside a rushing stream, leading up to a fine viewpoint, which may be visited without charge or formality", and describes access by Clyde steamer and bus services.

In 1948, the Scottish Mountaineering Club Journal noted regular visits to Puck's Glen, "attractive at all seasons but at its best in the Rhododendron month of June", and praised the view "from the Rest Hut, exquisitely designed by Robert Lorimer".

The Bayley Balfour Memorial Hut, Puck's Hut, was moved in 1968 to the walled garden in the Botanic Garden. It originally had a fireplace and chimney, but these were not reconstructed, and were replaced by an additional window. In 1992 the hut was listed as a Grade C listed building. The Puck's Glen path needed repair, and was restored in May 1986, with renewed bridges.

== Woodland trails ==
The high rainfall, with an average annual precipitation of around 200 to 230 cm (79 to 91 in), is suited to temperate rainforest and associated undergrowth. The acid soil makes the area particularly suitable for conifers. The Forestry Commission has planted coniferous trees at the sides of Puck's Glen, which runs through Uig Wood. The lower slopes of this woodland feature some of the earliest tree plantations on the estate.

The wood forms part of Benmore forest, which features waymarked trails leading visitors among trees including giant Californian redwoods, Douglas fir and Western hemlock. Puck's Glen itself is part of the Puck's Glen Gorge Trail, leading from the car park, and the Black Gates Trail which starts at the entrance to Benmore Botanic Garden, and goes past extensive mature conifers on the hillside of Benmore forest before connecting to the top of the Upper Puck's Glen loop.

A signpost at the forestry track crossing Puck's Glen points south along the track to Kilmun Arboretum and north along the track to Benmore Botanic Garden. It also points to the Upper Puck's Glen Loop path which continues further uphill beside the stream before connecting to the top of the Black Gates Trail. Some detailed routes are available online at Walkhighlands.

== Gallery ==
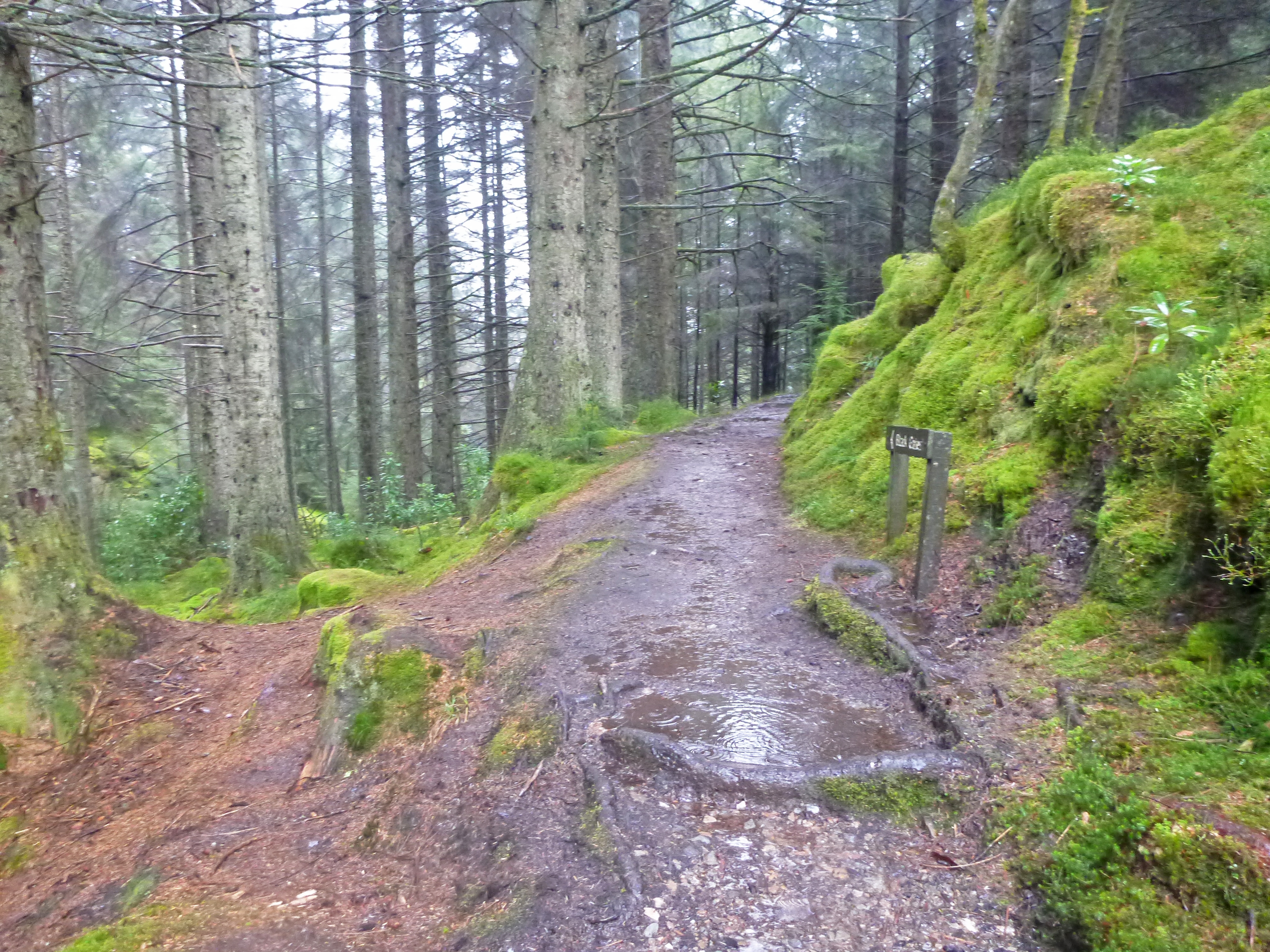
Connection to the top of the Black Gates Trail.

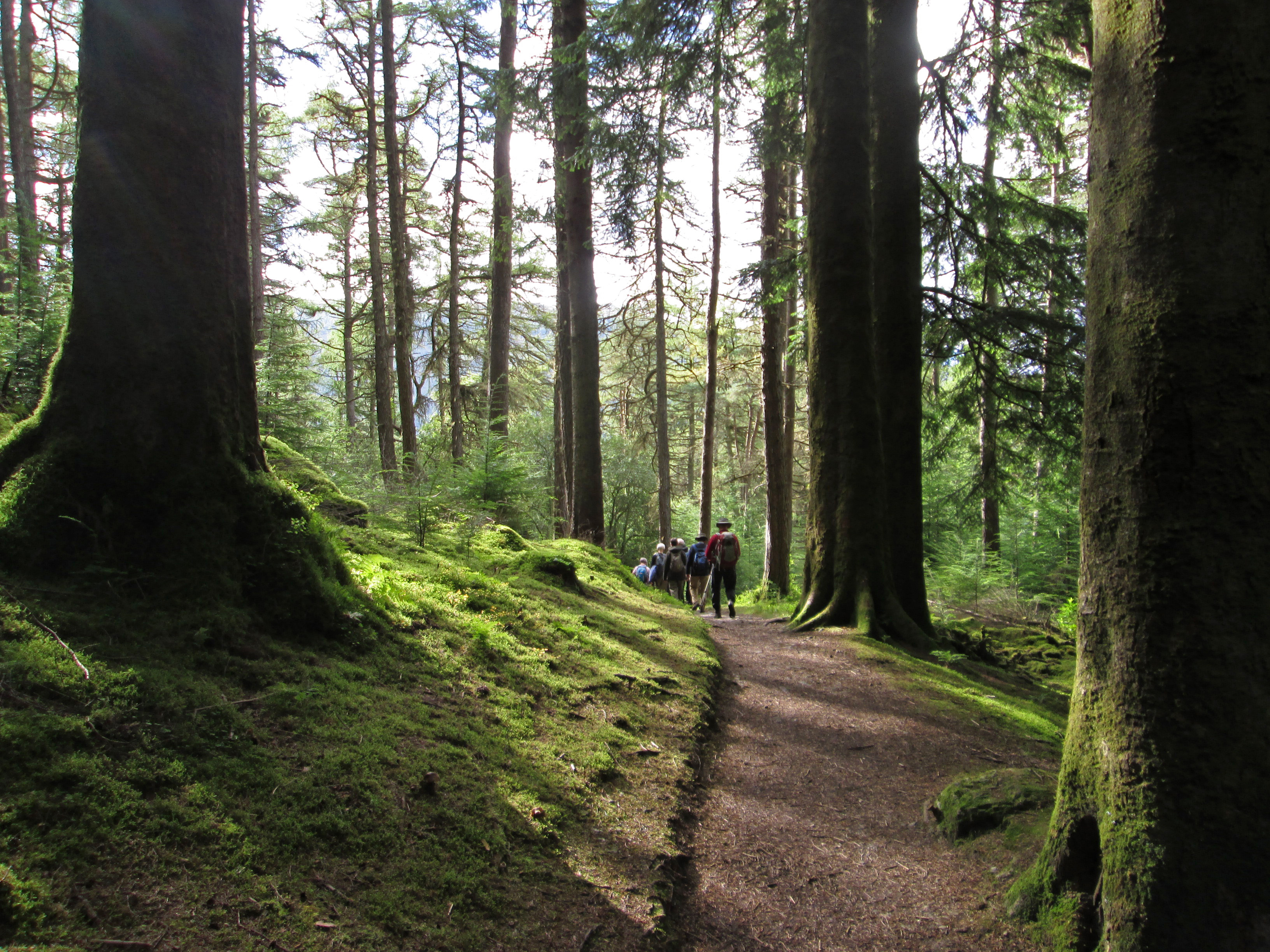
Trail down to car park

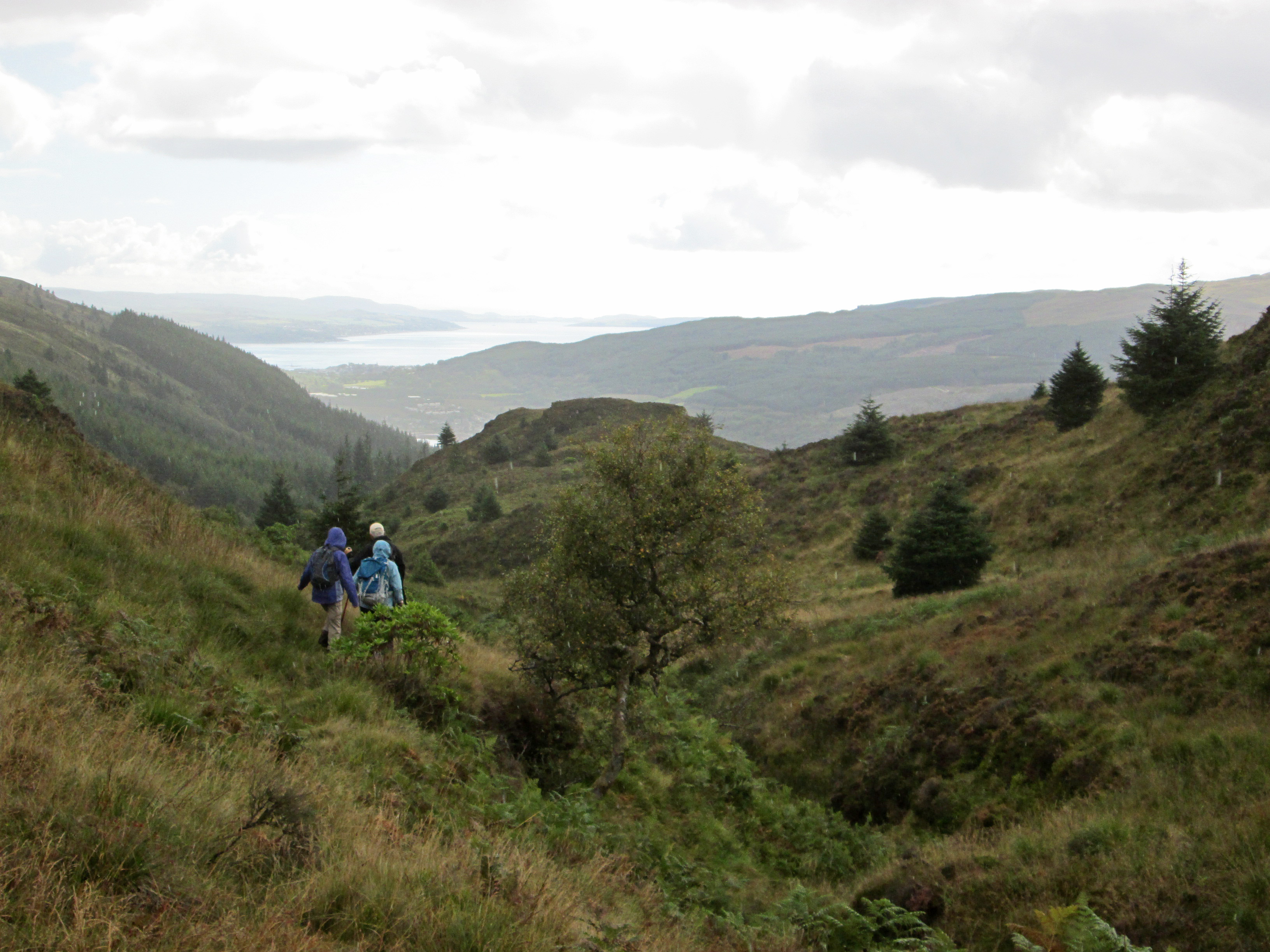
Modern view above the treelike, looking down over the upper glen past the Holy Loch and Dunoon to the Firth of Clyde.

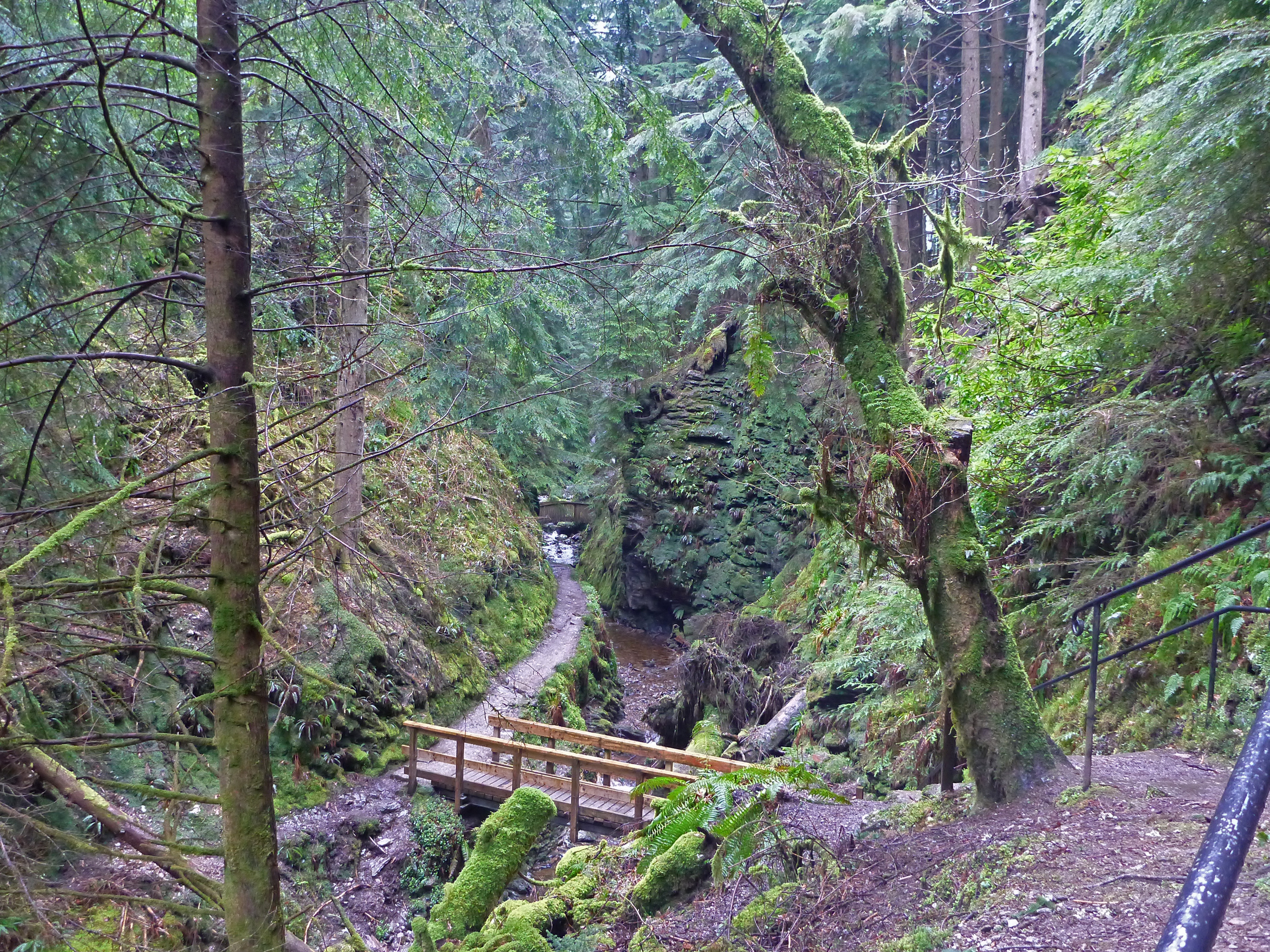
The path ascends, with ups and downs, through woodland.

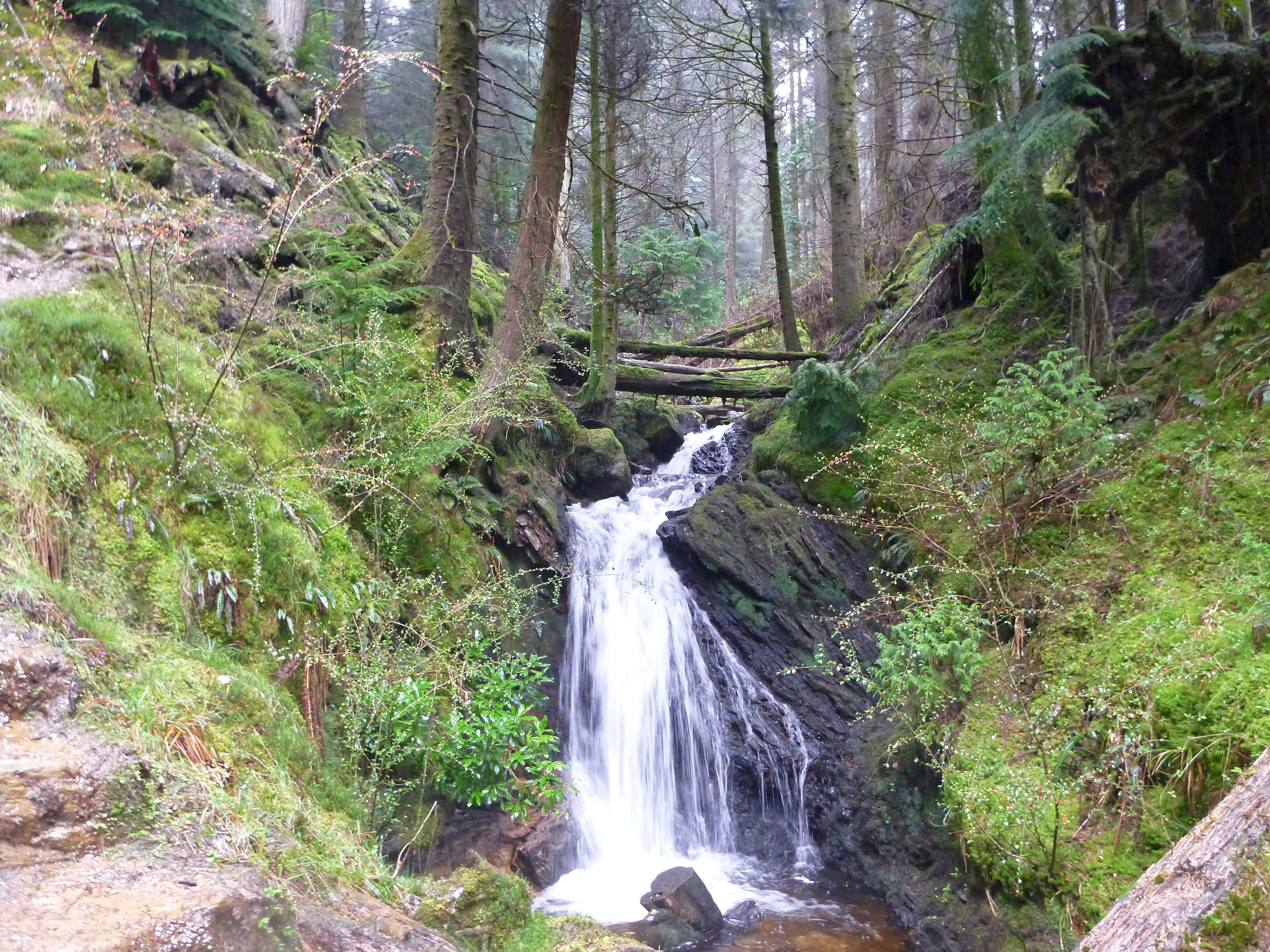
Waterfall beside the path in Upper Puck's Glen

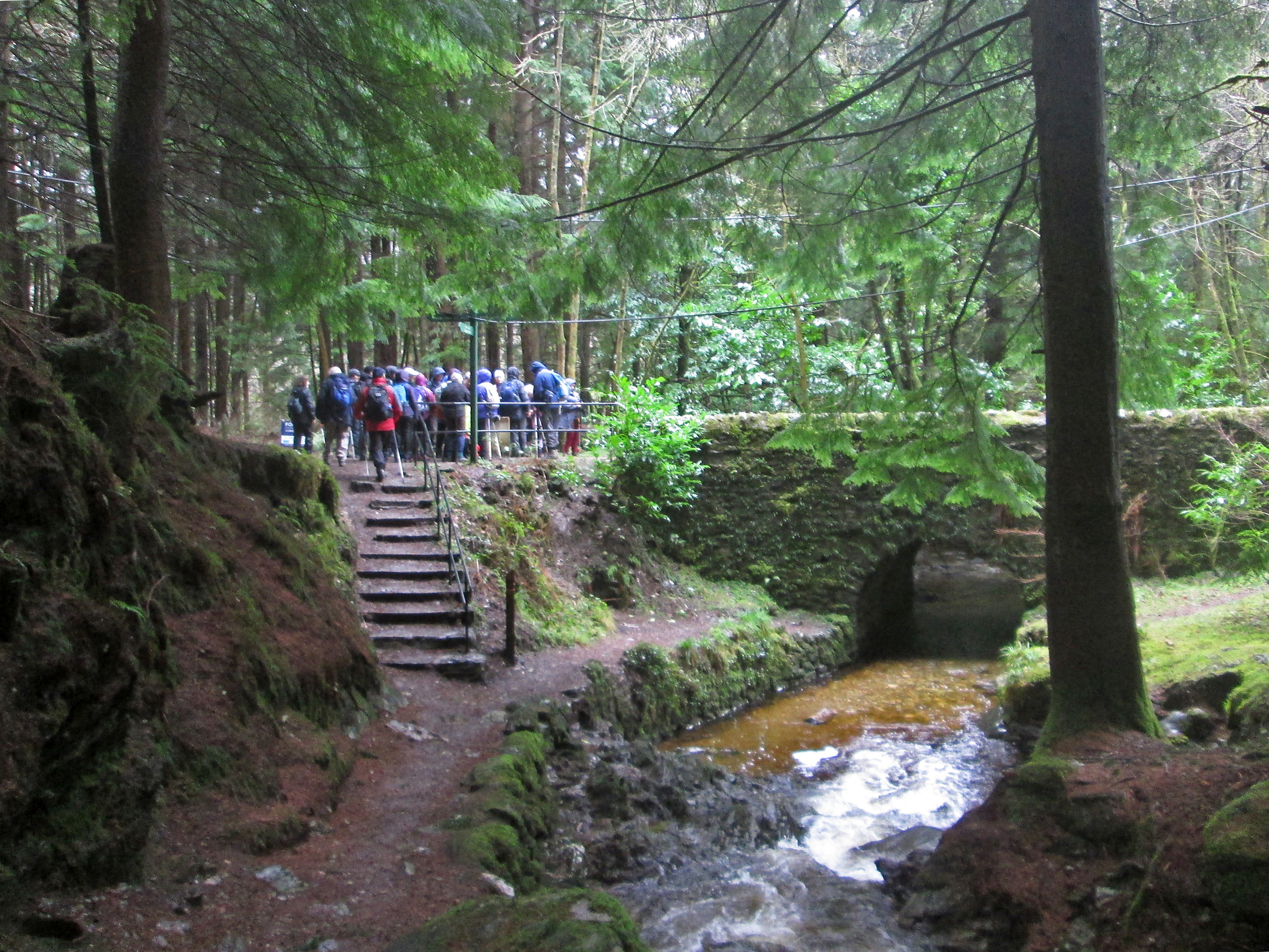
Steps down from the old main road to the foot of the trail

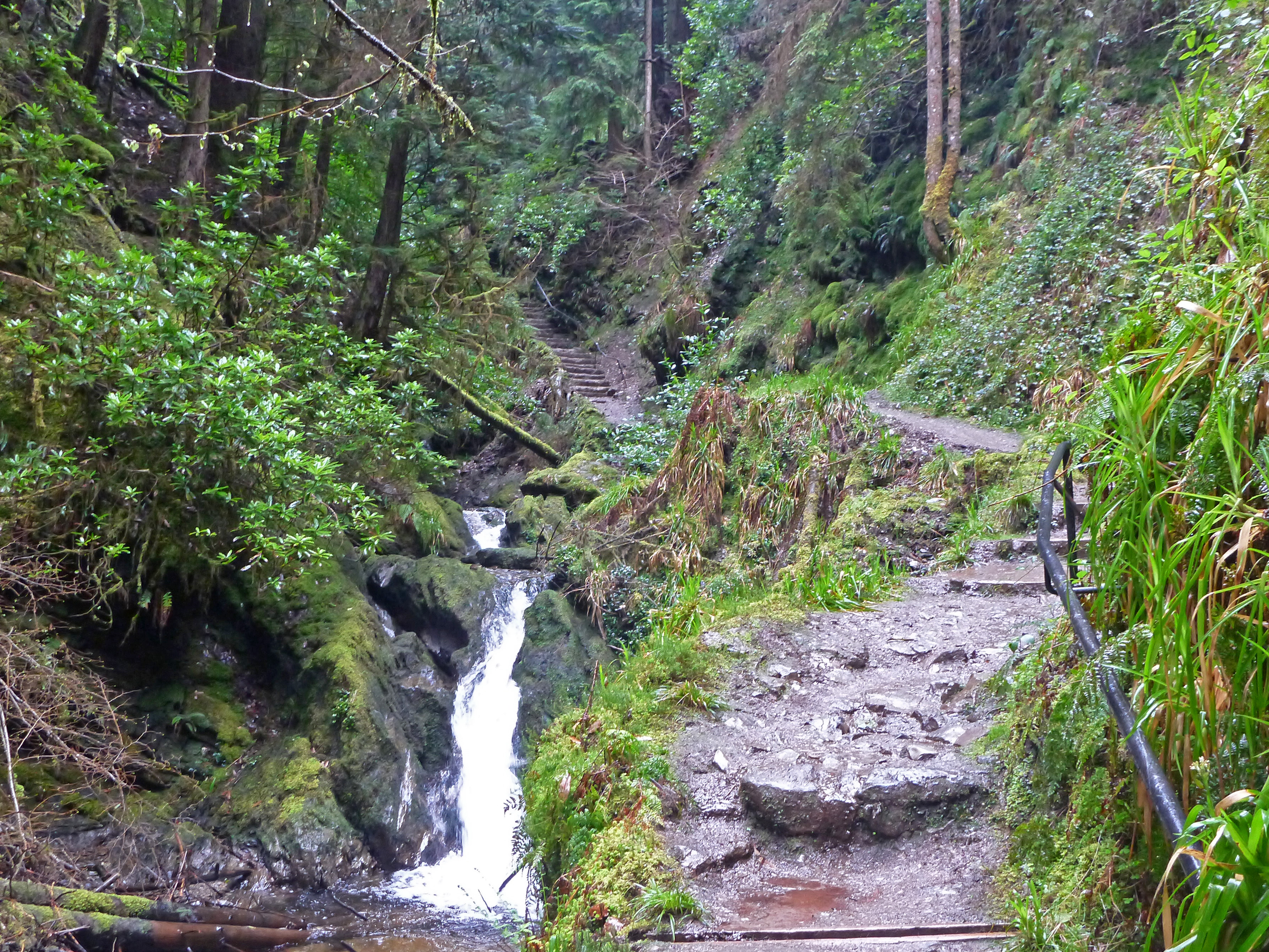
Path up by a series of waterfalls.

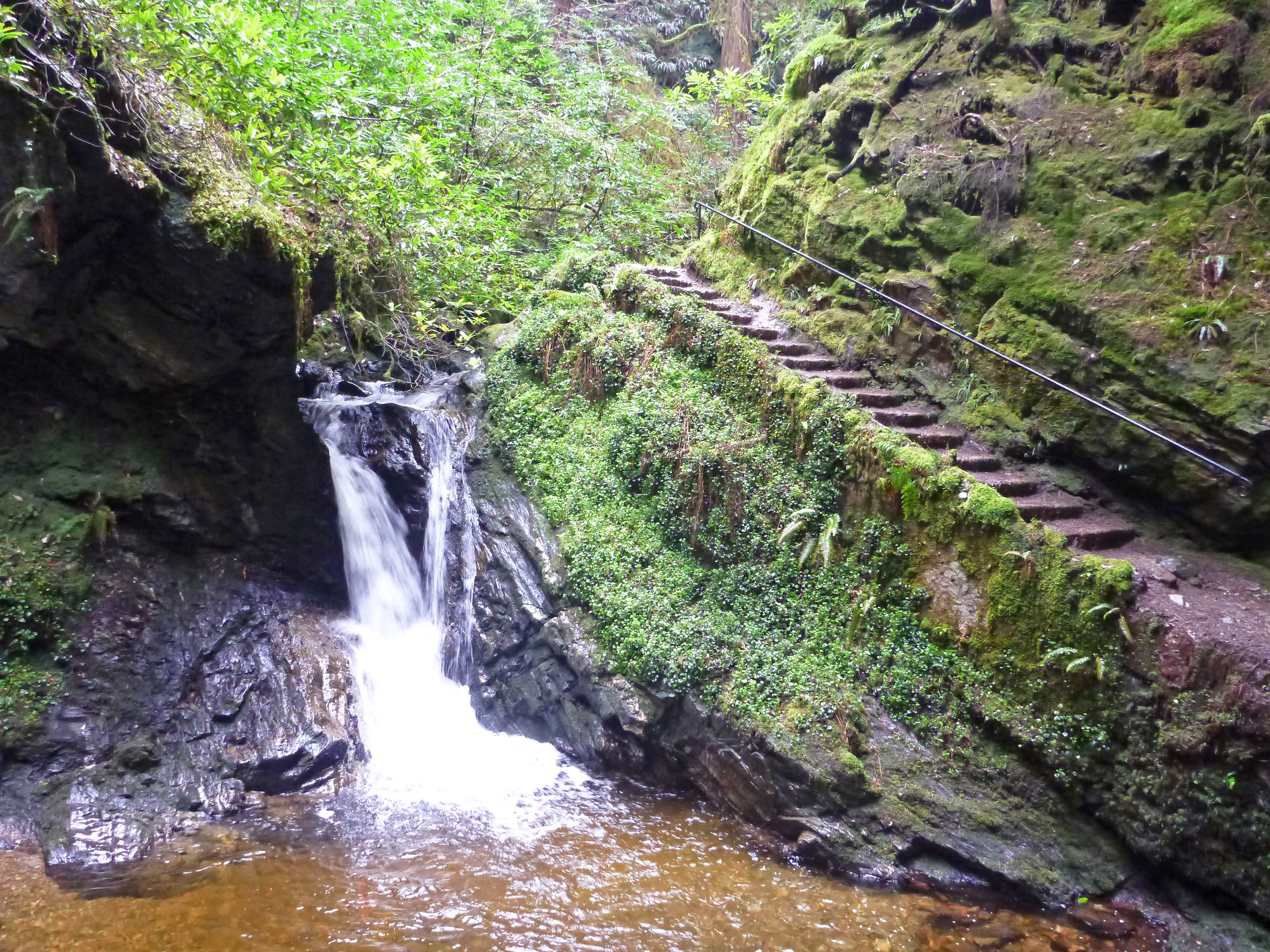
Steps beside a large waterfall.
