= Rashfield =

Coordinates: 56.009011°N 4.9732852°W

- Location within Argyll and Bute
- OS grid reference: NS 14730 83554
- Council area: Argyll and Bute
- Lieutenancy area: Argyll and Bute
- Country: Scotland
- Sovereign state: United Kingdom
- Post town: DUNOON, ARGYLL
- Postcode district: PA23
- Dialling code: 01369
- UK Parliament: Argyll, Bute and South Lochaber
- Scottish Parliament: Argyll and Bute

Rashfield is a hamlet on the Cowal peninsula, situated between Loch Eck and the head of Holy Loch, in Argyll and Bute, Scotland. The hamlet is on the A815 road and the River Eachaig flows past from Loch Eck to the Holy Loch. Rashfield is within the Argyll Forest Park, which is itself within the Loch Lomond and The Trossachs National Park.

== Rashfield Primary School ==
Rashfield Primary School was closed in 1998. Pupils now travel to Sandbank Primary.
