= Glenbranter =

Coordinates: 56.135145°N 5.0423423°W

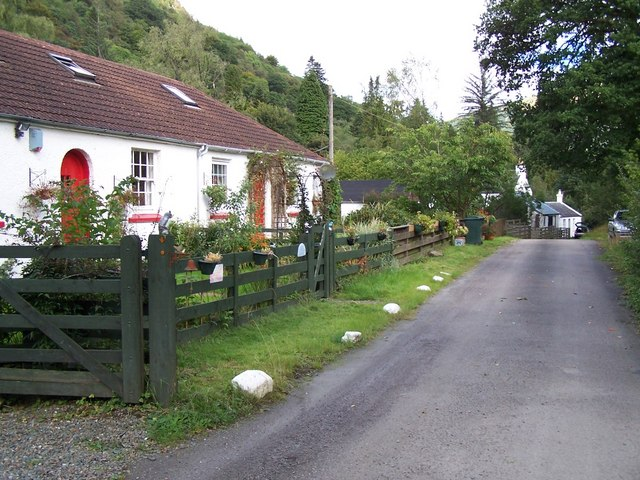
- Glenbranter, Cottages

- Location within Argyll and Bute
- OS grid reference: NS 11045 97773
- Council area: Argyll and Bute
- Lieutenancy area: Argyll and Bute
- Country: Scotland
- Sovereign state: United Kingdom
- Post town: DUNOON, ARGYLL
- Postcode district: PA23
- Dialling code: 01369
- UK Parliament: Argyll, Bute and South Lochaber
- Scottish Parliament: Argyll and Bute

Glenbranter is a hamlet and former estate, once owned by Sir Harry Lauder, on the northwest shore of Loch Eck in the Argyll Forest Park, on the Cowal Peninsula, in Argyll and Bute, West of Scotland.

The River Cur passes the main entrance to the hamlet, it flows under the two arch bridge called Bridend. Built around 1806, as part of the road reconstruction between Strachur and Ardentinny. The bridge has been designated since August 1980 (LB18186).

== Harry Lauder ==
Glenbranter Mansion House, seat of Sir Harry Lauder

Lauder bought the Glenbranter Estate on 13 October 1916; he sold it to the Forestry Commission in 1921 and it became part of the Argyll Forest Park in 1935. The Estate House was demolished in 1956.

=== Lauder Monument ===
There is a memorial to Harry Lauder's son, Captain John Currie Lauder, of the 8th Battalion Argyll & Sutherland Highlanders, who died at Pozières on 28 December 1916, during the First World War. The monument is a short walk from the A815 road.

== Work camp ==
The estate was the location of a work camp in the 1930s, part of the MacDonald National Government's Instructional Centres scheme. Men were given three months' "training" on a workfare-like scheme.

== Gallery ==
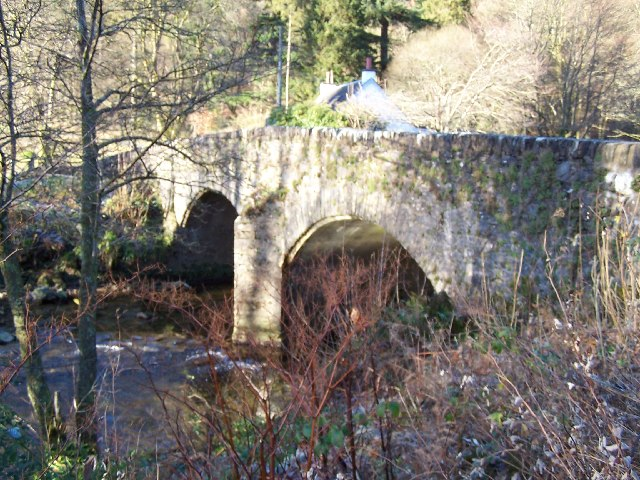
Glenbranter Bridge

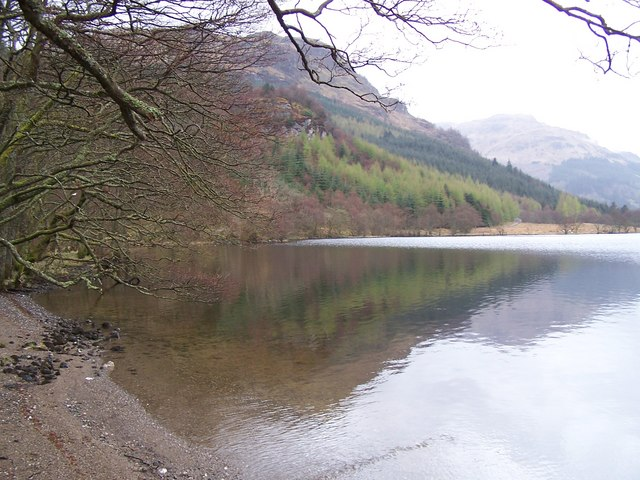
Loch Eck, Benmore-Glenbranter Forestry Road

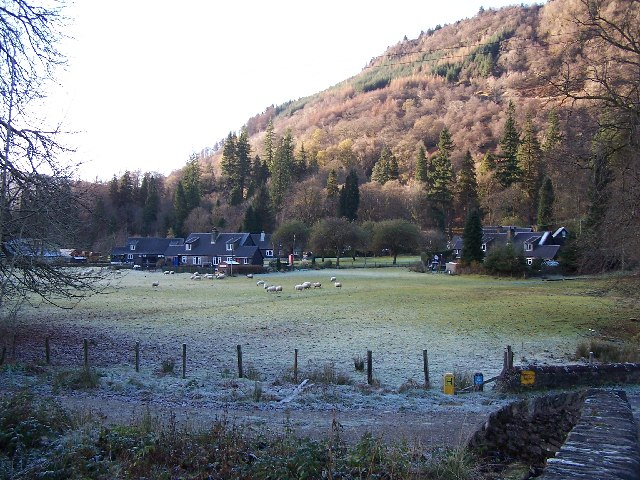
Glenbranter Cottages

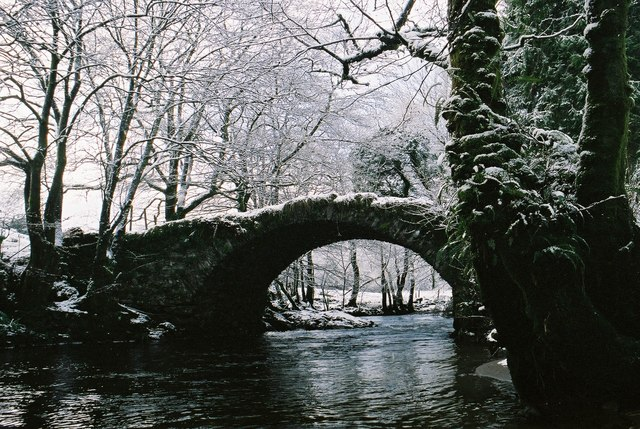
Old Bridge at Glenshellish Farm, Glenbranter, Cowal

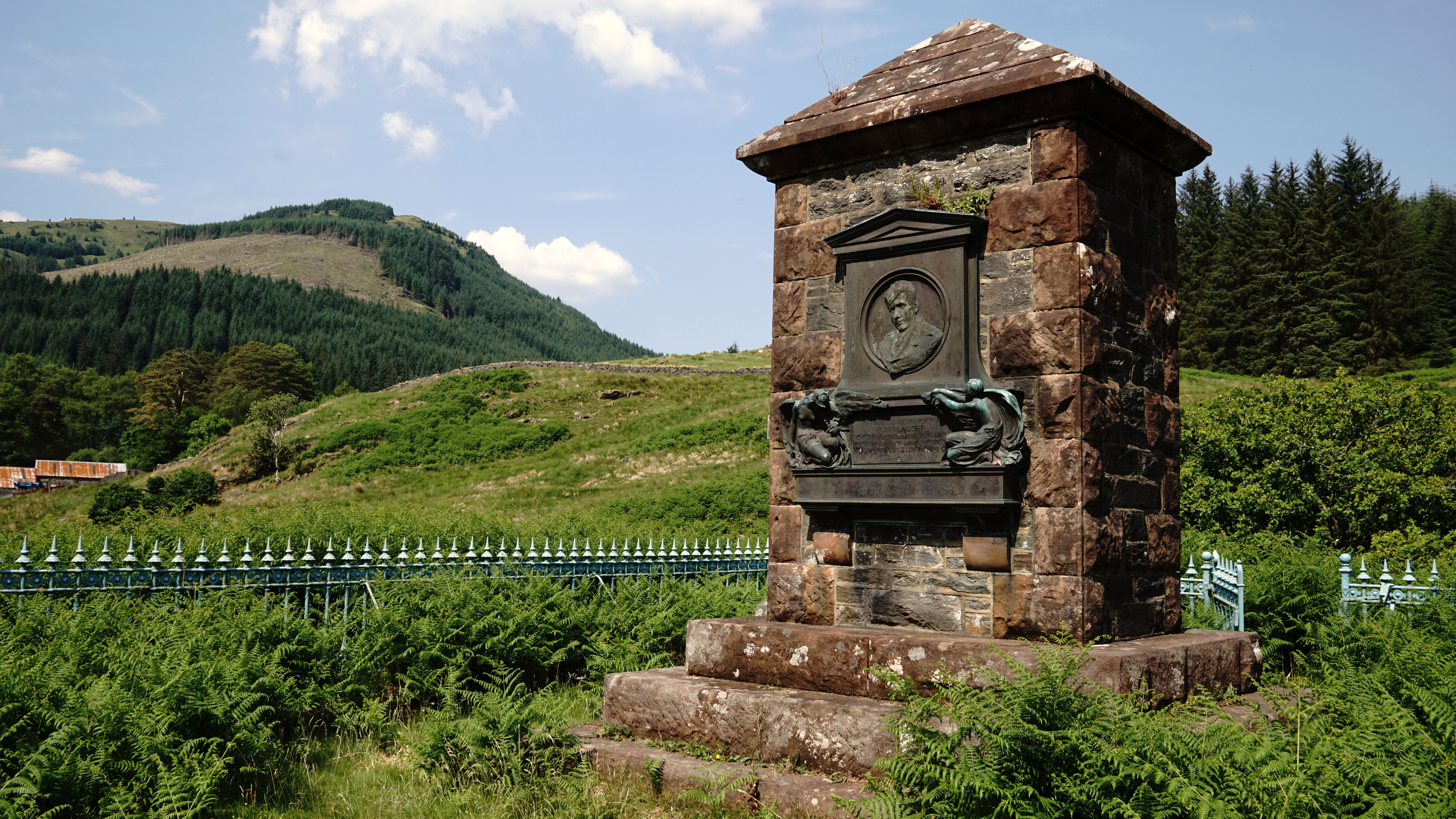
Argyll and Bute - Lauder Memorial, Invernoaden - 20230616152724

== See also ==
- River Cur
