= Benmore Botanic Garden =

Botanical garden in Argyll and Bute, Scotland

Coordinates: 56°01′35″N 04°58′52″W

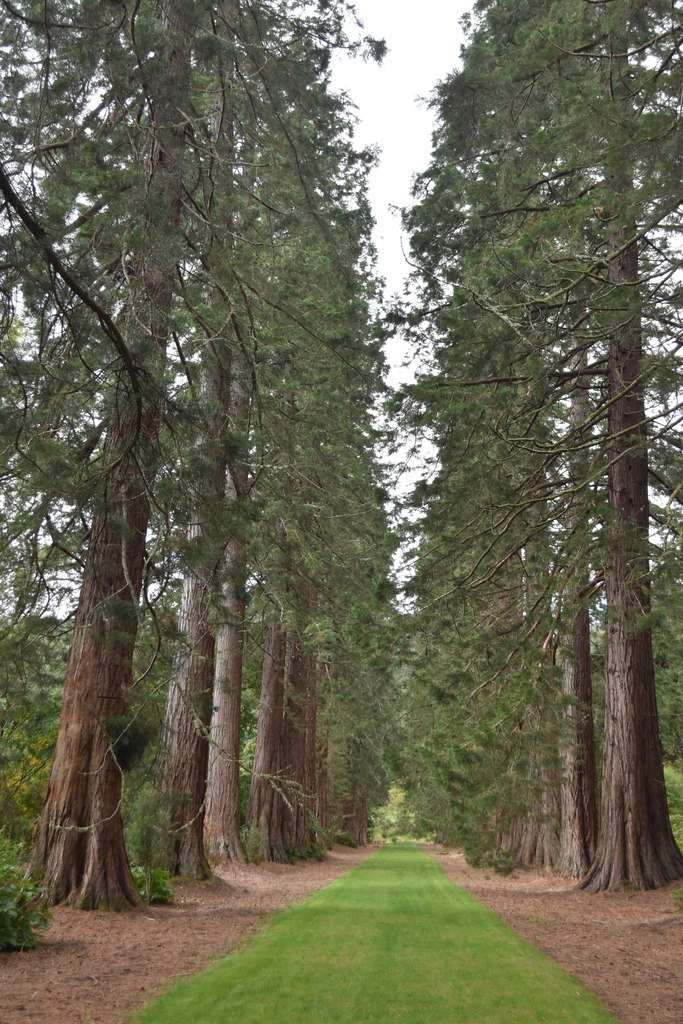
- The avenue of giant sequoias at Benmore Botanic Garden

- Location within Argyll and Bute
- OS grid reference: NS 14319 85507
- Council area: Argyll and Bute
- Lieutenancy area: Argyll and Bute
- Country: Scotland
- Sovereign state: United Kingdom
- Post town: DUNOON, ARGYLL
- Postcode district: PA23
- Dialling code: 01369
- UK Parliament: Argyll, Bute and South Lochaber
- Scottish Parliament: Argyll and Bute
- Website: www.rbge.org.uk/visit/benmore-botanic-garden/

Designations

Inventory of Gardens and Designed Landscapes in Scotland
- Official name: Benmore (Younger Botanic Garden)
- Designated: 30 June 1987
- Reference no.: GDL00056

Benmore Botanic Garden (formerly known as the Younger Botanic Garden) is a large botanical garden situated in Strath Eachaig at the foot of Beinn Mhòr, on the Cowal peninsula in Argyll and Bute, west of Scotland. The gardens are on the west side of the A815 road from Dunoon, between the Holy Loch and Loch Eck, and include footbridges across the River Eachaig. It is one of the sites of the Royal Botanic Garden Edinburgh.

Features include an avenue of giant sequoias planted in 1863, large square walled gardens, a waterfall, a fernery, ponds and walks up the hillside to viewpoints over the Holy Loch. The garden is located within the Argyll Forest Park, which forms part of the Loch Lomond and The Trossachs National Park.

== History ==
Most of Cowal, originally Clan Lamont territory, was taken over by Clan Campbell, including lands in Strath Echaig, shortly after 1400. The area once called "Innasraugh", meaning "the sheltered valley", was part of the hunting grounds of the Dukes of Argyll, belonging to the Campbells of Ballochyle. It was reached by a ford across the River Eachaig at Uig, near modern Eckford house.

Around 1820, Ross Wilson introduced tree planting with the first known coniferous plantation of forest trees in Cowal. In 1849 the estate was bought by John Lamont, a wealthy sugar planter and slaveowner in Trinidad who had emigrated from Toward (near Dunoon) 48 years earlier. He arranged replacement of the previous manor house with the larger Benmore House, but died in 1850, a year before the house was completed. His nephew James Lamont inherited the estate, but then sold it and it went to various other owners in succession.

Benmore Estate was bought in 1862 by James Piers Patrick, a wealthy American who carried out extensive work to Benmore House, including construction of the tower, designed in the Scottish baronial style by the architect Charles Wilson. He developed the garden, and in 1863 planted the Redwood Avenue of giant sequoias.

In 1870 the Greenock sugar refiner and philanthropist James Duncan bought Benmore Estate, which he extended to include the adjacent Kilmun and Bernice Estates. He arranged extensive plantings in the grounds, including more than six million trees around the estate, and added paths leading up a ravine one kilometre (5/8 mile) to the south on the east side of the road, making Puck's Glen a scenic attraction. He extended the east wing of the house with a gallery to house his major collection of paintings: during the summers of 1881 and 1882, these were seen by more than 8,000 visitors. In 1889 he had to sell his assets, including Benmore.

Henry Younger of the Edinburgh brewer Younger's bought the estate in 1889, and with his son Harry George Younger made many improvements to the woods and gardens, with 40 staff employed to carry out maintenance. They introduced many exotic shrubs and trees, and also demolished the gallery and conservatory at the house. In 1924 Harry George Younger gifted the estate to the nation for science and education purposes: the Forestry Commission took over most of the woodlands.

In commemoration of the improvements James Duncan had made to the estate, Younger provided a hut high on the hillside above the gorge of Puck's Glen, to a special design by Sir Robert Lorimer, and "Puck's Hut" was dedicated to the memory of the botanist Sir Isaac Bayley Balfour.

The Royal Botanic Garden Edinburgh (RBGE) was looking for a place to take the large collection of plants which the botanist George Forrest had brought from China, and the high rainfall at Benmore was ideal. In 1929 the Younger Botanic Gardens were opened as the first outstation of the RBGE. In the 1930s, the Forestry Commission established Kilmun Arboretum, to try out tree species in the humid climate conditions, planting large groups of trees rather than individual specimens. Benmore House was used by the Forestry Commission for apprentice training, then in 1965 Edinburgh Corporation took it over as a schools outdoor education centre.

In the winds brought by Storm Ali in September 2018, four large trees at the garden were felled.

== Features ==
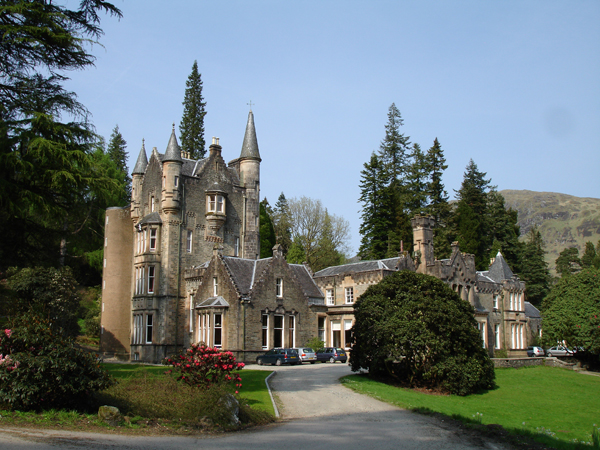
Benmore House

Benmore is a satellite garden under the management of the RBGE, as is its sister garden Logan Botanic Garden and Dawyck Botanic Garden.

The Fernery, constructed in the early 1870s, fell into ruin after James Duncan lost his fortune. In 1992, Historic Scotland designated the fernery a category B listed building, describing it as "a rare structure and important as an integral part of the gardens at Benmore". It has since been restored, and re-opened to the public in September 2009.

Benmore Outdoor Centre, in the former Benmore House, is an outdoor training centre for school groups, and for other organisations and family groups. It is managed by the Children and Families Department of the City of Edinburgh Council. The native red squirrel can be found in the garden.

== See also ==
- Dawyck Botanic Garden
- Logan Botanic Garden

== Gallery ==
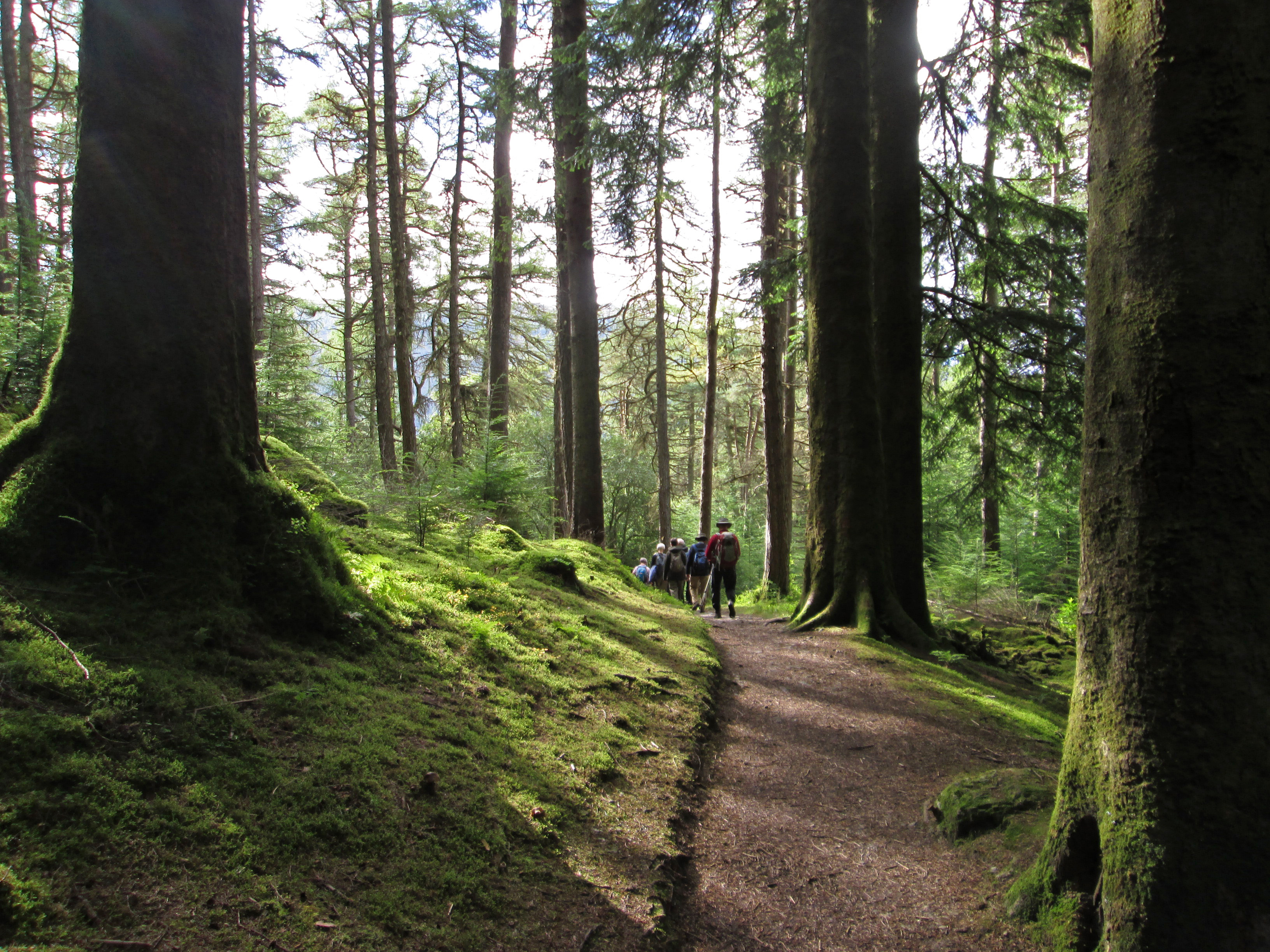
Benmore forest

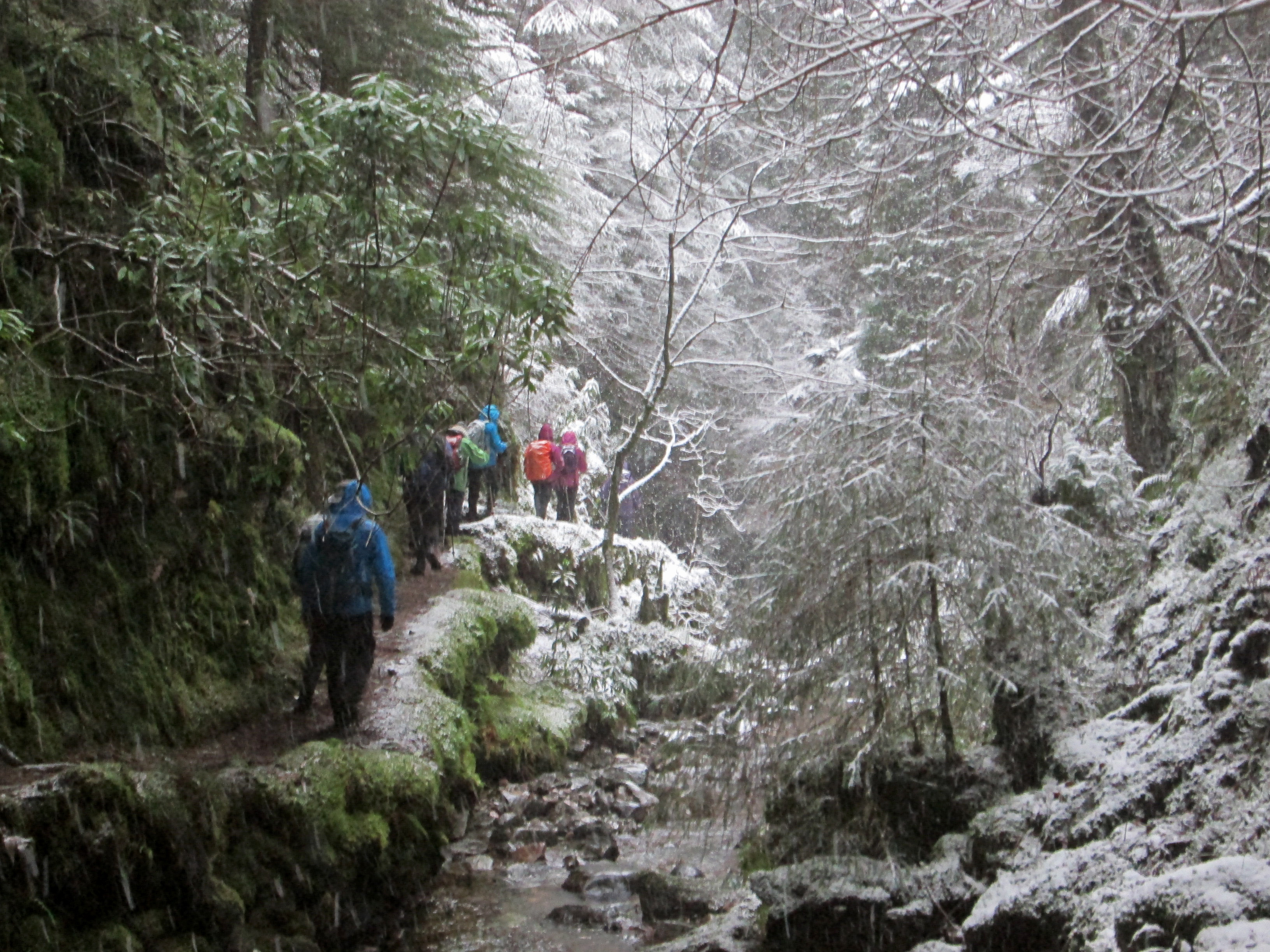
Puck's Glen ravine, in winter

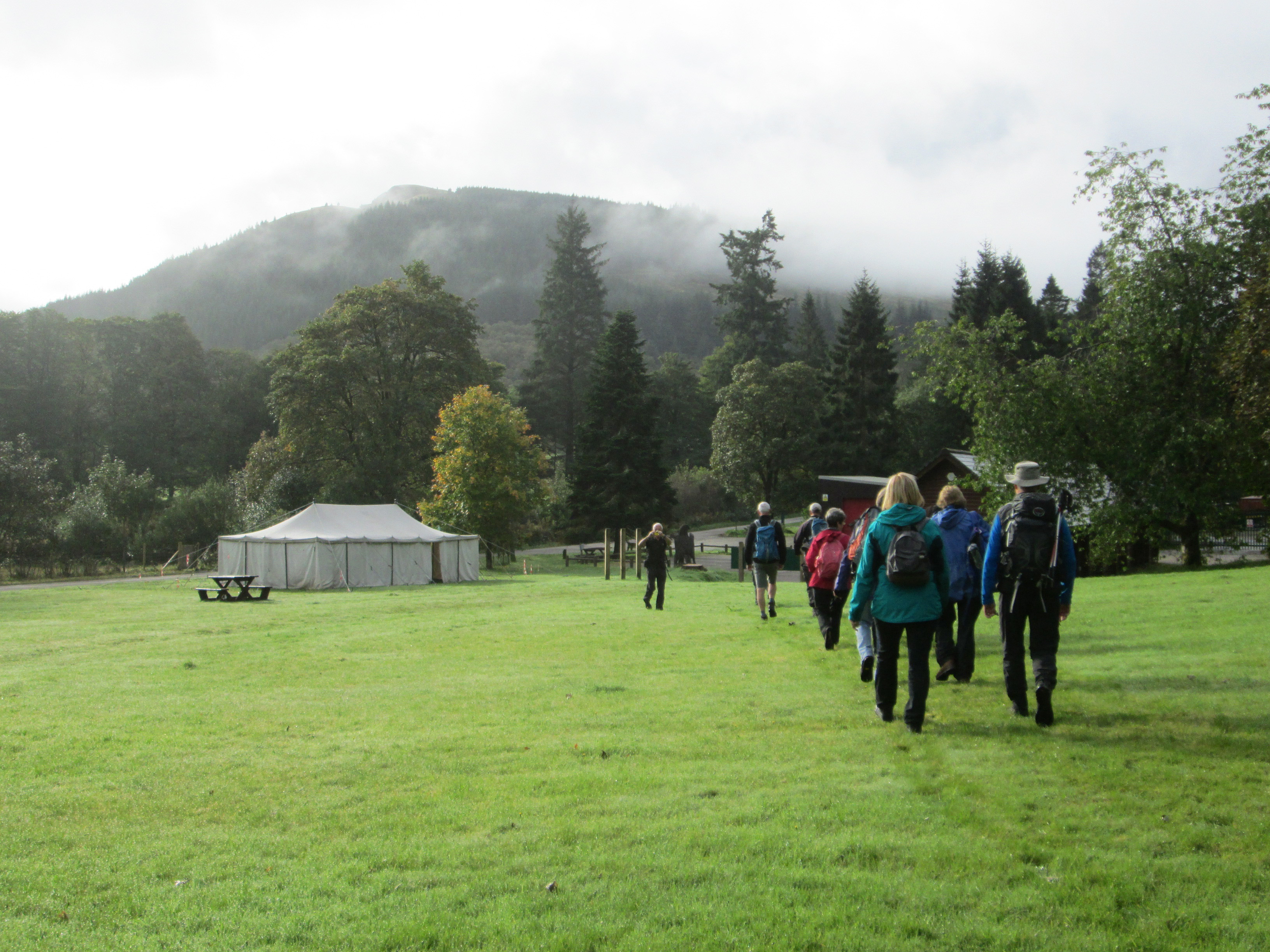
Glenbranter

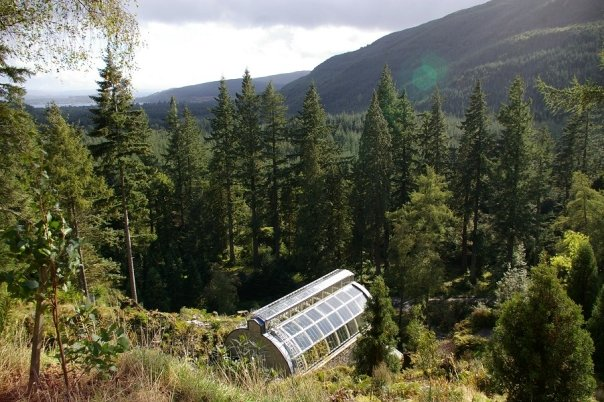
View of the fernery

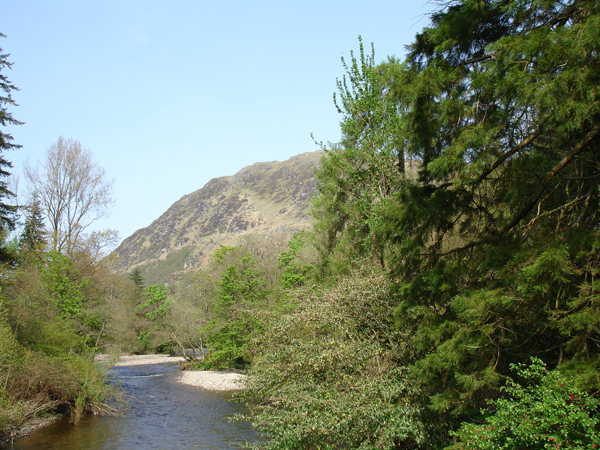
Benmore Botanic Garden

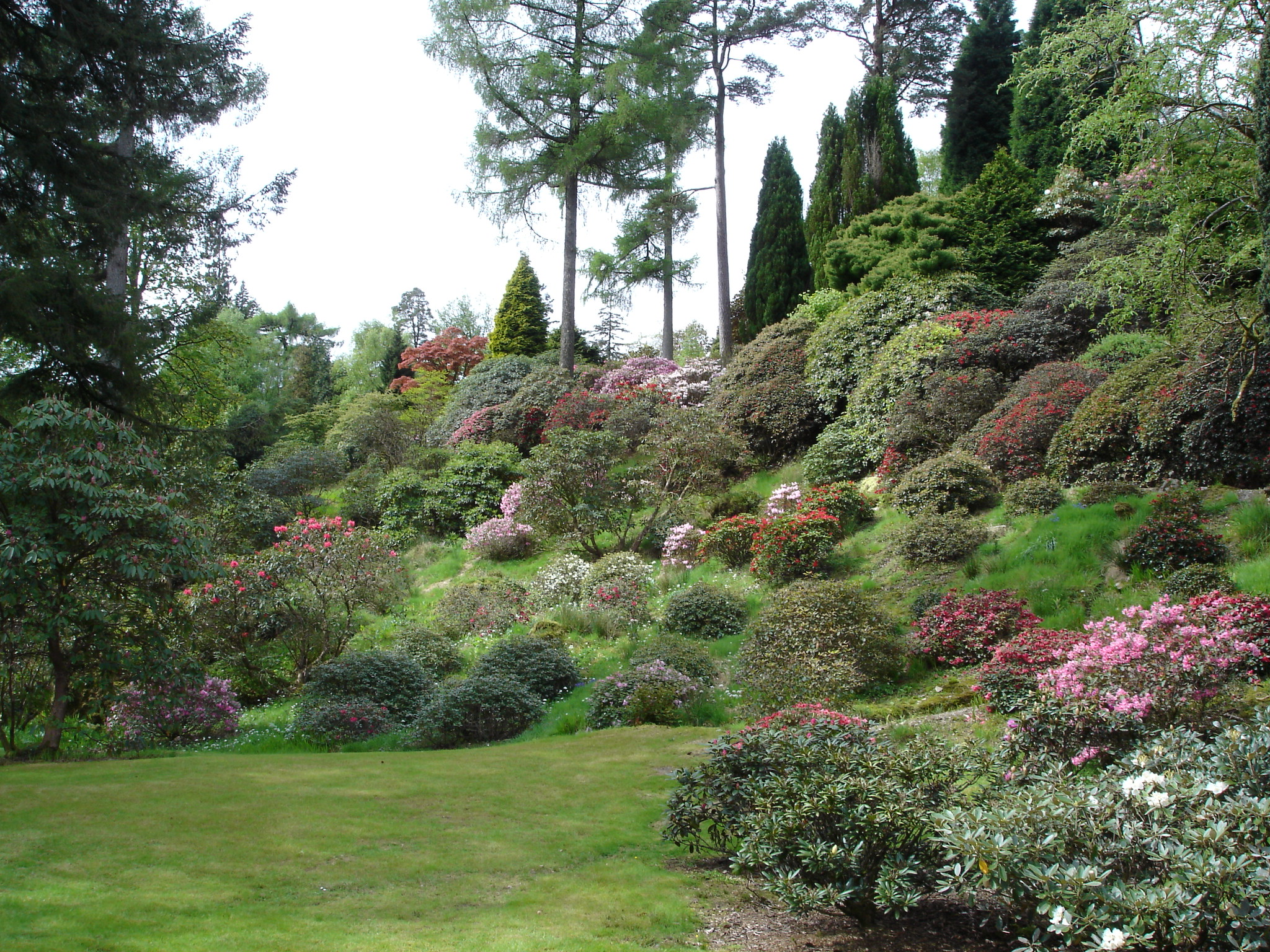
Rhododendron in bloom

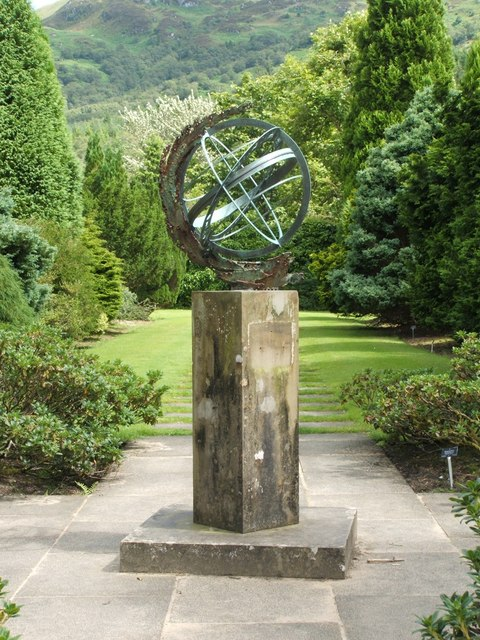
Sundial in the Formal Gardens

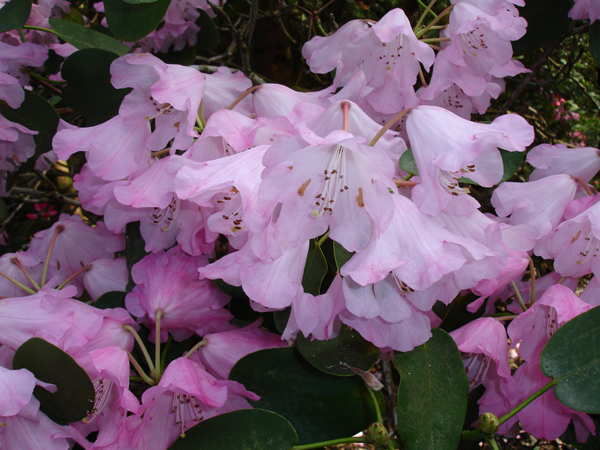
Rhododendron 'James Barto' at Benmore Botanic Garden

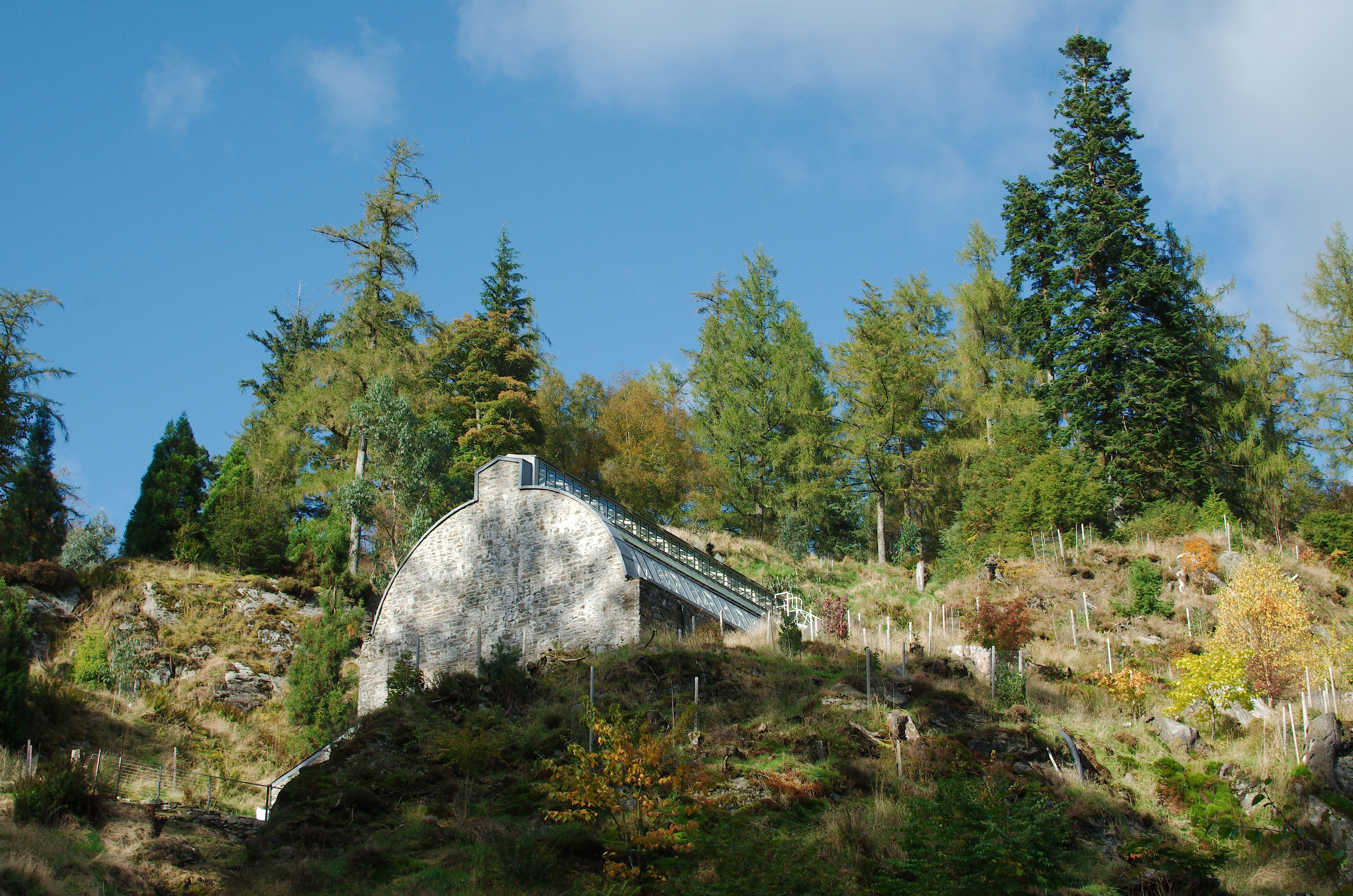
The refurbished fernery
