= River Cur =

Tributary of Loch Eck, Scotland

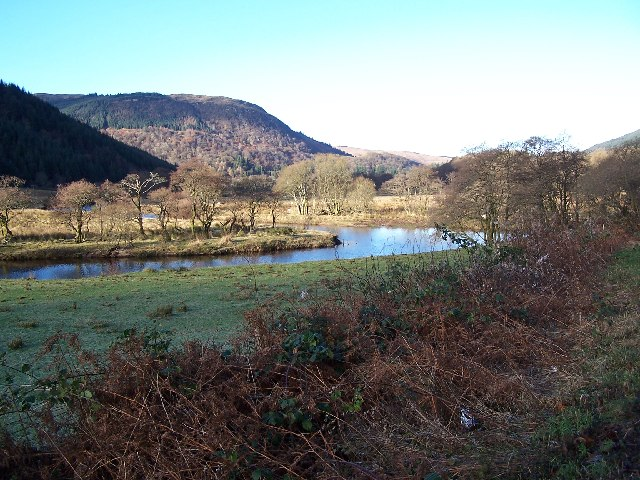
- The River Cur

Location
- Region: Argyll and Bute
- Country: Scotland

Physical characteristics
- Mouth
  - location: Loch Eck
  - coordinates: 56°07′20″N 5°00′47″W

The River Cur is a river on the Cowal Peninsula, in Argyll and Bute, west of Scotland. The position of its source is uncertain, as it is formed from a large number of small burns; for example, one of these rises on the slopes of Cruach nam Mult, at grid reference NN165056 and an elevation of about 2,000 feet (600 m). The river flows south-west until it reaches the head of a glacial valley near Strachur, Loch Fyne. (For a short distance it forms the boundary of the Argyll Forest Park, which it soon enters.) The river does not enter Loch Fyne, but instead turns south-east. At that point it has reached an elevation of only about 160 feet (50 m), and it continues along the valley, losing altitude much more slowly, until it reaches the head of Loch Eck. Before reaching Loch Eck, it passes near the tiny settlements of Balliemore and Invernoaden and Glenbranter.
