= Fernery =

Garden of ferns

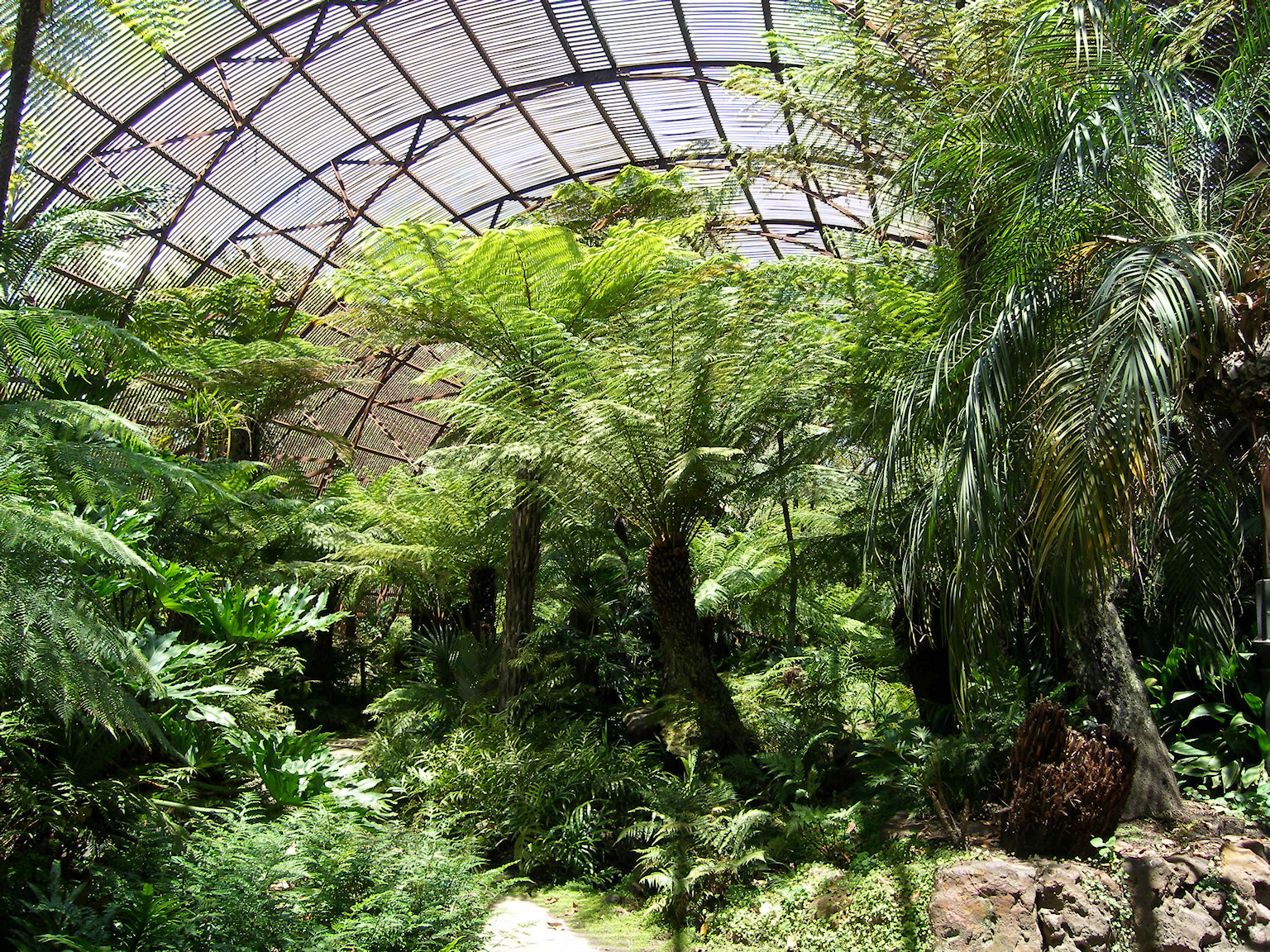
Fernery at Rippon Lea, Australia

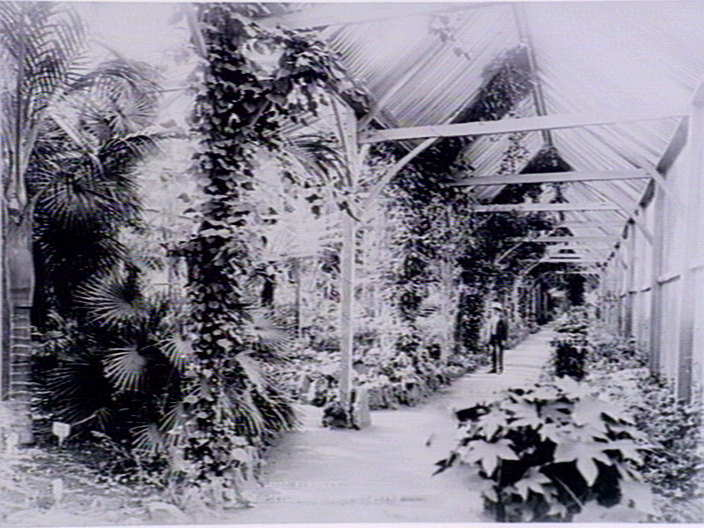
A fernery at the Geelong Botanic Gardens (1892–1902)

A fernery is a specialized garden for the cultivation and display of ferns.

In many countries, ferneries are indoors or at least sheltered or kept in a shadehouse to provide a moist environment, filtered light and protection from frost and other extremes; on the other hand, some ferns native to arid regions require protection from rain and humid conditions, and grow best in full sun. In mild climates, ferneries are often outside and have an array of different species that grow under similar conditions.

In 1855, parts of England were gripped by 'pteridomania' (the fern craze). This term was coined by Charles Kingsley, clergyman, naturalist (and later author of The Water Babies). It involved both British and exotic varieties being collected and displayed; many associated structures were constructed and paraphernalia was used to maintain the collections.

In 1859, the Fernery at Tatton Park Gardens beside Tatton Hall had been built to a design by George Stokes, Joseph Paxton's assistant and son-in-law, to the west of the conservatory to house tree ferns from New Zealand and a collection of other ferns. The Fernery was also seen in the TV miniseries Brideshead Revisited.

In 1874, the fernery in Benmore Botanic Garden (part of the Royal Botanic Garden Edinburgh) was built by James Duncan (a plant collector and sugar refiner). This was a large and expensive project since the fernery was based in a heated conservatory. In 1992, it was listed Historic Scotland for its architectural and botanical value and has been described by the Royal Commission on the Ancient and Historical Monuments of Scotland as "extremely rare and unique in its design".

In 1903, Hever Castle in Kent was acquired and restored by the American millionaire William Waldorf Astor who used it as a family residence. He added the Italian Garden (including a fernery) to display his collection of statuary and ornaments.

== The Dorrance H. Hamilton Fernery ==
The Dorrance H. Hamilton Fernery

The Dorrance H. Hamilton Fernery at Morris Arboretum in Chestnut Hill, Pennsylvania, is the last remaining freestanding Victorian fernery in North America. Originally built in 1899, this fernery underwent a $1.2 million renovation project in 1994. It is home to over 200 different species of ferns and fern allies.
