= James Duncan (art collector) =

- Born: 4 April 1834; Springburn, Lanarkshire, Scotland
- Died: 12 August 1905 (aged 71); Spean Bridge, Inverness-shire, Scotland
- Occupations: Sugar refiner, art collector

James Duncan (4 April 1834 — 12 August 1905) was a Scottish sugar refiner and businessman, who then became a philanthropist and art collector. His house and grounds on the Cowal peninsula in Argyll became Benmore Botanic Garden, now managed by the Royal Botanic Garden Edinburgh.

== Biography ==
Duncan was born on 4 April 1834 in Springburn, Lanarkshire. He was the son of a successful Glasgow bookseller.

In the early 1850s, while studying chemistry at Glasgow, Duncan took a boat trip from Greenock to the lochs and coastlines of Argyll. While on Loch Long, he conceived a unique method of refining sugar, a method which he then patented. Between 1858 and 1861, Duncan was a partner of the Greenock sugar refinery Duncan, Bell & Scott. In 1854, the refinery was producing up to 50,000 tons of sugar.

In the mid-1860s, Duncan developed the Clyde Wharf Refinery in Silvertown, London, which became the largest and most profitable sugar refinery in London. Duncan constantly refined the process and learned different applications to keep Clyde Wharf at the top of the industry. At the peak of the business, Clyde Wharf was producing up to two thousand tons of sugar per week. In August 1885, Duncan published an article in the Sugar Cane Journal, titled 'The bounty on exportation of refined sugar from the United States'.

In 1878, Duncan was elected Fellow of the Society of Chemical Industry, later becoming its vice president. By 1879, he held the post of Chairman of the Sugar Refiners' Committee, and also became Chairman of the Railway and Canal Traders' Union.

By the mid-1880s, cheaper German sugar imports led to the closure of Clyde Wharf in 1886. Duncan returned to Scotland, to manage the smaller refinery business in Greenock. After he retired, he spent time with his sister Mary Moubray in Strone, and spent the winter months in Italy.

Duncan died at Spean Bridge, near Fort William on 12 August 1905, aged 71. Duncan is buried in the churchyard at Kilmun, Argyll under a pink granite slab on a high part of the steep graveyard with a view looking across the Holy Loch. A memorial obelisk to Duncan designed by Archibald McFarlane Shannan was erected in 1906 at Graham's Point in Kilmun.

== Philanthropy ==
Duncan's charitable work was widely known throughout Britain. He gave twenty per cent of his annual £100,000 salary to a range of causes, making him one of the most committed philanthropists of the time.

Duncan was known as a major collector of fine art and was also a lender of pictures to annual exhibitions, including the Royal Glasgow Institute of the Fine Arts. In 1878, he was elected the institute's vice president. He regularly contributed works to European exhibitions, including to the Paris Salon, and to key international exhibitions of art and industry in France and Germany in the 1870s and 1880s. Duncan was the first Scottish collector of Impressionist works, including purchasing, in 1883, Renoir's The Bay of Naples (Morning) (1881). The painting was later lent to the Scottish National Gallery by the Metropolitan Museum of Art in New York (who now own it), for an exhibition about Duncan's collection. Duncan was also one of the most valued and important clients of the influential French picture dealer Paul Durand-Ruel, regularly frequenting the studios of Europe's most famous painters. He collected works by the likes of Henry Raeburn and Camille Corot, including Eugène Delacroix's The Death of Sardanapalus (1827).

Duncan had a varied circle of friends from different fields, including the chemist James "Paraffin" Young who established the world's first commercial oil works; the pioneering ophthalmic surgeon Dr Neven Gordon Cluckie, whose work led to the establishment of eye surgeries in hospitals throughout Britain; the celebrated preacher Charles Spurgeon; the Rev. Henry Boyd (Principal of Hertford College, Oxford, 1878–1922), with whom Duncan had worked closely in the 1870s to improve working conditions in London's East End; and Gustave Doré, the French artist whose gallery, paintings and book illustrations were popular in Britain. Peter Baxter (a curator at Benmore House) noted that “Duncan also employed his significant wealth in helping the poor in Scotland and England and improving the working conditions of his workforce, building churches and schools, providing medical care and introducing an eight-hour working day."

Duncan was a correspondent of the eminent botanist Joseph Dalton Hooker and of Henry Morton Stanley, the explorer and friend of David Livingstone, who visited Duncan some time in the 1870s or 1880s.

Duncan also financed the building of two churches.

== Benmore House ==
In 1870, Duncan purchased Benmore House near Dunoon, Argyll. He then commissioned the construction of a large gallery building to showcase his large collection of fine arts along with a fernery and one of the largest greenhouses in Scotland.

The estates amounted to 12,260 acres of land. Duncan made extensive improvements to the land, on some of which he kept West Highland cattle and Scottish Blackface sheep. The sheep were first seen at the Paris International Exhibition of 1878. His flock of sheep gained awards at the annual exhibitions of the Highland and Agricultural Society of Scotland. Duncan also had over six million trees planted as part of the large landscape alterations he had designed, including commissioning features such as the 'Golden Gates', which were earlier shown at the Paris International Exhibition.

Following the introduction of sugar imports from Germany, Duncan suffered a massive loss of fortune and had to sell the estate in 1889. Benmore House was acquired by the Younger family and later gifted to Royal Botanic Garden Edinburgh. It is now the Benmore Botanic Garden.

Duncan's art collection at Benmore was split up and sold and the paintings are now housed in museums around the world, including the Louvre, the Belvedere in Vienna, the Art Institute of Chicago and the Metropolitan Museum of Art in New York. The latter is home to four works from Duncan's collection.
