= River Eachaig =

River in Argyll and Bute, Scotland

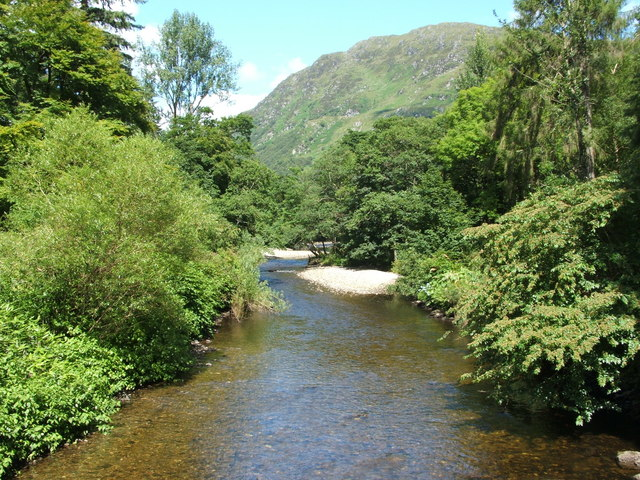
- The River Eachaig at Benmore Botanic Garden
- Etymology: place of horses

Physical characteristics
- Source: Loch Eck
  - location: Cowal
  - coordinates: 56.038795°N 4.9847063°W
  - elevation: 24 m (79 ft)
- Mouth: Holy Loch
  - location: Cowal
  - coordinates: 55.998381°N 4.9517269°W
  - elevation: Sea level

Basin features
- Tributaries
  - left: Little Eachaig River, River Massan
  - right: Inverchapel Burn

The River Eachaig is a river on the Cowal Peninsula, in Argyll and Bute, west of Scotland.

The river flows from Loch Eck to the Holy Loch, passing Benmore Botanic Garden, Rashfield and Cot House. It is joined by the Inverchapel Burn and the River Massan. The Little Eachaig River joins the River Eachaig immediately before it empties into the Holy Loch.

The old route from Inveraray to the Firth of Clyde involved travelling down Loch Eck, then crossing the River Eachaig to get to Dunoon – Mary Queen of Scots went this way in 1563. A small boat or punt called a coite carried passengers over the river, and the thatched house of the ferryman became known as the Cot House, eventually the Cot House Inn.

Around 1835 David Napier built a road from Kilmun pier to Loch Eck as part of the "new route to Inveraray", and at this time the ferry was replaced by a wooden bridge. This in time needed replaced, and around the end of 1884 the Trustees of the Dunoon District of Roads, Argyllshire, arranged for engineers and contractors to construct a new malleable iron girder bridge spanning 70 feet (21 m) over the river; this bridge was completed in May 1885. It is a single-span wrought iron double warren lattice truss bridge, spanning between abutments at each end with splayed stone parapets.

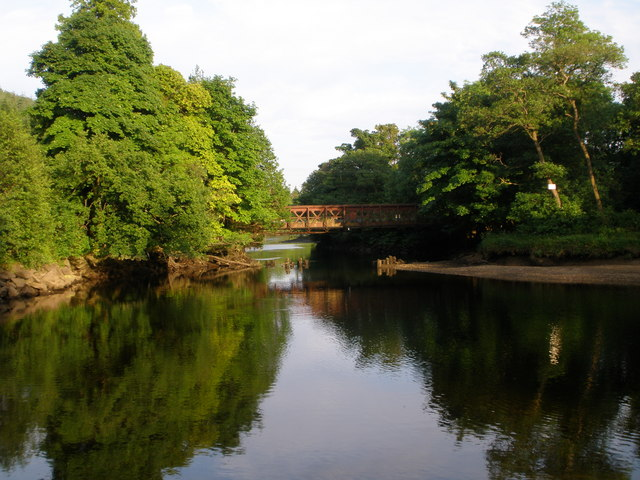
The Eachaig Bridge built in 1885 across the River Eachaig at the Cot House Inn, Kilmun.

This route was still shown in the Ordnance Survey 7th series one-inch map published in 1960, in following decades the A815 main road was realigned with a curve crossing the river on a new bridge to the north of the old bridge, and the A880 side road from Kilmun extended to join this as a side road. The old bridge is still in place, and is a listed building as a rare example of an unaltered wrought iron bridge.
