= Invereck =

- Interactive map of the Invereck area

General information
- Type: Residence
- Location: Sandbank, Scotland
- Coordinates: 56.003492°N 4.977722°W
- Completed: c. 1886 (140 years ago)

Height
- Architectural: Scottish baronial
- Roof: Slate

Technical details
- Floor count: 2 or 3

Design and construction
- Architect: James Thomson

Invereck is a Category B listed building in Sandbank, near Dunoon, Argyll and Bute, Scotland. Dating to around 1886, it is located near the head of the Holy Loch.

In the first half of the 19th century, Invereck was the summer home of botanist William Jackson Hooker. "He seems to have devoted special attention to the vegetation of the neighbourhood," wrote John Colegate in 1868. "The result of his inquiries were published in the Rev. Dr. McKay's Statistical Account of the United Parishes of Dunoon and Kilmun."

There was a cottage, described by the Ordnance Survey as "small but handsome", on the site of today's building in the mid-19th century. The cottage and its grounds were sold to George Miller in 1872.

The house has been a Church of Scotland Eventide Home since 1946, although it was up for sale in 2020. Prior to that, it is believed to have been used by the Independent Order of Foresters.

== See also ==
- List of listed buildings in Dunoon And Kilmun
