= Old Kilmun House =

- Location within Scotland
- 55.9974259°N 4.9435256°W
- Location: Midge Lane, Kilmun, Argyll and Bute, Scotland

History
- Built: early 18th century

Listed Building – Category A
- Designated: 1 October 1992
- Reference no.

Old Kilmun House is an historic building on Midge Lane in Kilmun, Argyll and Bute, Scotland. Now Category A listed, it was built, in the early 18th century, in foothills overlooking the Holy Loch from its northern shores.

Historic Environment Scotland describes it as one of the most important buildings in the parish, and in a national sense due to its six-bay layout. "Few houses combine such classical features with an asymmetrical façade," they wrote. It is two storeys.

Since its original construction, which reused stone from a 16th- or 17th-century building, it was extended to the rear in the 19th century, as well as an early 20th-century addition to its southwestern corner. In the second half of the 19th century, a large addition was made to its northwestern corner. The earlier parts of the building are of rubble with sandstone dressing, while the later block is fine ashlar.

The garden and boundary walls are also of Category A listed status. To the west of this were two large buildings which had been demolished by the end of the 19th century. Part of the garden was used for the western edge of the cemetery of the adjacent Kilmun Parish Church and Argyll Mausoleum.

== See also ==
- List of listed buildings in Dunoon and Kilmun
