= List of listed buildings in Dunoon And Kilmun =

This is a list of listed buildings in the parish of Dunoon And Kilmun in Argyll and Bute, Scotland.

== List ==
Name	Location	Date Listed	Grid Ref. (Note: Sometimes known as OSGB36, the grid reference (where provided) is based on the British national grid reference system used by the Ordnance Survey. • "Guide to National Grid". Ordnance Survey. • "Get-a-map". Ordnance Survey.)	Geo-coordinates	Notes	LB Number (Note: Historic Environment Scotland assign a unique alphanumeric identifier to each designated site in Scotland, for listed buildings this always begins with "LB", for example "LB12345".)	Image
Kilmun Pier And Associated Buildings				55°59′33″N 4°56′02″W	Category B	85	Upload another image
Blairmore Farm Including Outbuildings And Farm Cottages				56°00′30″N 4°54′14″W	Category C(S)	50415	Upload Photo
Blairmore, Shore Road, Blair Athol, Including Coach House, Boundary Walls And Gatepiers				56°00′08″N 4°53′53″W	Category C(S)	50425	Upload Photo
Blairmore, Shore Road, Creggandarroch				55°59′55″N 4°53′49″W	Category B	50428	Upload Photo
Loch Eck, Inverchapel Lodge Including Boundary Walls And Garden Walls				56°02′39″N 4°59′00″W	Category C(S)	50438	Upload Photo
Strone, 1, 2, 3, 4, 5, 6 High Cottages				55°59′12″N 4°54′22″W	Category C(S)	50439	Upload Photo
Strone, Choille Bheag Including Outbuildings, Boundary Walls, Gatepiers And Gates				55°59′19″N 4°55′04″W	Category B	50440	Upload Photo
Strone, Dunselma Stables Including Boundary Walls				55°59′09″N 4°53′58″W	Category C(S)	50441	Upload Photo
Strone House Including Boundary Walls, Gatepiers And Gates				55°59′06″N 4°53′51″W	Category C(S)	50442	Upload Photo
Kilmun, Shore Road, Anchorage, Ardmun, Fountain Villa, Heathbank, Lochview And Woodburn (The Tea Caddies) Including Outbuildings, Boundary Walls, Gatepiers And Gates				55°59′41″N 4°56′13″W	Category C(S)	5065	Upload Photo
Benmore View, Shore Road, Sandbank				55°58′58″N 4°57′01″W	Category B	43020	Upload Photo
Blairmore Pier, Former Ticket Office				55°59′41″N 4°53′43″W	Category C(S)	6611	Upload Photo
Benmore Botanic Garden, Benmore House, Fernery				56°01′23″N 4°59′37″W	Category B	6436	Upload another image
Whistlefield Inn Including Ancillary Buildings And Boundary Walls				56°05′46″N 4°59′05″W	Category C(S)	5060	Upload another image
Castle Toward				55°52′11″N 5°00′51″W	Category B	5068	Upload another image
Strone, Dunselma Including Outbuilding, Boundary Walls, Gates And Gatepiers				55°59′07″N 4°53′59″W	Category A	5075	Upload another image
Benmore Botanic Garden, Footbridge Over The Eachaig River				56°01′08″N 4°59′05″W	Category C(S)	50413	Upload Photo
Blairmore Hall (Former Ferry Waiting Room)				55°59′40″N 4°53′44″W	Category C(S)	50417	Upload Photo
Blairmore, Shore Road, Bannachra, Including Coach House, Boundary Walls And Gatepiers				56°00′13″N 4°53′54″W	Category C(S)	50424	Upload Photo
Blairmore, Shore Road, Duart Tower Including Outbuilding, Boundary Walls And Gatepiers				55°59′59″N 4°53′51″W	Category C(S)	50429	Upload Photo
Glenfinart House Walled Garden Including Well And Ancillary Buildings				56°03′18″N 4°54′42″W	Category B	50431	Upload Photo
Kilmun, Shore Road, Younger Hall Including Boundary Wall, Railings, Gatepiers And Gates				55°59′36″N 4°56′03″W	Category C(S)	43021	Upload Photo
Ardentinny, Blinkbonny, Raglan, Fern Cottage And Glencairn, Including Boundary Walls				56°02′47″N 4°54′38″W	Category B	5057	Upload Photo
Ardentinny, Ferry Cottages Including Boundary Walls				56°02′42″N 4°54′31″W	Category C(S)	5059	Upload Photo
Kilmun, K6 Telephone Kiosk At Kilmun Pier				55°59′34″N 4°56′02″W	Category B	5067	Upload Photo
Toward Lighthouse, Toward Point				55°51′43″N 4°58′47″W	Category B	5070	Upload Photo
Blairmore Pier				55°59′40″N 4°53′40″W	Category C(S)	50419	Upload Photo
Blairmore, Shore Road, Blairmore House, Lodge				55°59′43″N 4°53′44″W	Category C(S)	50427	Upload Photo
Strone, Midge Lake, Rhubeg Grotto				55°59′13″N 4°54′59″W	Category C(S)	50443	Upload Photo
Kilmun, Old Kilmun House, Including Boundary Walls				55°59′51″N 4°56′37″W	Category A	6582	Upload Photo
Benmore Botanic Garden, Benmore House, Steading				56°01′42″N 4°59′11″W	Category B	5076	Upload Photo
Benmore Botanic Garden, Benmore House, Cottages To East Of Walled Garden (Riverside And Adjoining Cottage)				56°01′42″N 4°58′57″W	Category C(S)	50412	Upload Photo
Blairmore, Fairy Knowe Including Coach House, Sundial, Gates And Gatepiers				55°59′30″N 4°53′47″W	Category C(S)	50414	Upload Photo
Blairmore Place (Mixed Use Building At Blairmore Pier)				55°59′39″N 4°53′44″W	Category C(S)	50422	Upload Photo
Kilmun, Shore Road, Finnart Including Boundary Walls, Ancillary Buildings And Sundial				55°59′44″N 4°56′22″W	Category C(S)	50437	Upload Photo
Strone, Midge Lane, Rockbank Including Coach House And Boundary Walls				55°59′13″N 4°54′47″W	Category C(S)	50444	Upload Photo
Strone, Shore Road, The Boathouse (Former Dunselma Boathouse) Including Boundary Walls, Gates And Gatepiers And Jetty				55°59′02″N 4°53′53″W	Category C(S)	50445	Upload Photo
Strone, Shore Road, Tyneshandon				55°59′02″N 4°54′13″W	Category C(S)	50448	Upload Photo
Benmore Botanic Garden, Benmore House, Walled Garden With Garden House, Gates And Fountain				56°01′41″N 4°59′05″W	Category B	6439	Upload another image
Toward Quay				55°52′00″N 5°01′18″W	Category B	6234	Upload Photo
Invereck (Church Of Scotland Eventide Home) Including Outbuildings, Boundary Walls And Gatepiers				56°00′13″N 4°58′40″W	Category B	50432	Upload Photo
Benmore Botanic Garden, Bayley Balfour Memorial Hut, Puck's Hut				56°01′40″N 4°59′11″W	Category C(S)	6437	Upload Photo
Benmore Botanic Garden, Benmore House, Golden Gates				56°01′19″N 4°59′23″W	Category A	6438	Upload another image
Kilmun, St Munn's Parish Church (Church Of Scotland) Including Argyll And Douglas Mausolea, Associated Buildings And Graveyard				55°59′47″N 4°56′33″W	Category A	5073	Upload another image
Benmore Botanic Garden, Benmore House (Benmore Outdoor Centre) Including Ancillary Buildings				56°01′32″N 4°59′18″W	Category B	95	Upload another image
Ardentinny, Ferry House				56°02′45″N 4°54′34″W	Category C(S)	50404	Upload Photo
Blairmore, Shore Road, Otterburn Including Outbuildings, Boundary Walls, Gatepiers And Gates				55°59′53″N 4°53′46″W	Category C(S)	50430	Upload Photo
Strone, Shore Road, Dunselma Lodge, Including Boundary Walls, Gates And Gatepiers				55°59′03″N 4°53′52″W	Category B	50447	Upload Photo
Sandbank Parish Church				55°58′50″N 4°56′49″W	Category C(S)	50828	Upload another image
Ardentinny Hotel				56°02′41″N 4°54′30″W	Category B	5058	Upload another image
Hafton House				55°58′38″N 4°55′29″W	Category B	5071	Upload another image
Hafton House Drybridge Over Rear Railway				55°58′35″N 4°55′29″W	Category B	5074	Upload Photo
Strone, St Columba's Church Of Scotland Including Halls, Boundary Walls And Gatepiers				55°59′02″N 4°53′55″W	Category C(S)	5080	Upload another image
Blairmore, Shore Road, Blairmore House Including Garage, Boundary Walls, Garden Walls And Gatepiers				55°59′44″N 4°53′47″W	Category B	50426	Upload Photo
Kilmun, Eachaig Bridge Including Stone Parapets				56°00′19″N 4°57′40″W	Category B	50433	Upload Photo
Kilmun, Graham's Point, Cast Iron Bus Shelter				55°59′24″N 4°55′41″W	Category C(S)	50434	Upload Photo
Kilmun, Graham's Point, Memorial To James Duncan				55°59′21″N 4°55′40″W	Category C(S)	50435	Upload Photo
Strone, Shore Road, Craigielee Including Fountain, Boundary Walls And Gatepiers				55°59′08″N 4°53′51″W	Category B	50446	Upload Photo
Benmore Botanic Garden, Benmore House North Lodge, Including Gates And Railings (Black Gate)				56°01′37″N 4°58′51″W	Category B	5077	Upload another image
Ardentinny Church Of Scotland				56°02′47″N 4°54′39″W	Category C(S)	86	Upload another image
Kilmun, Shore Road, Cashlie, Including Boundary Walls				56°00′13″N 4°57′26″W	Category C(S)	50436	Upload Photo

== Key ==
The scheme for classifying buildings in Scotland is:

- Category A: "buildings of national or international importance, either architectural or historic; or fine, little-altered examples of some particular period, style or building type."
- Category B: "buildings of regional or more than local importance; or major examples of some particular period, style or building type, which may have been altered."
- Category C: "buildings of local importance; lesser examples of any period, style, or building type, as originally constructed or moderately altered; and simple traditional buildings which group well with other listed buildings."

In March 2016 there were 47,288 listed buildings in Scotland. Of these, 8% were Category A, and 50% were Category B, with the remaining 42% being Category C.

== See also ==
- List of listed buildings in Argyll and Bute
