= Beinn Mhòr (Cowal) =

Highest mountain on the Cowal Peninsula west of Loch Eck in Argyll and Bute, Scotland

Coordinates: 56.07155°N 5.04287°W

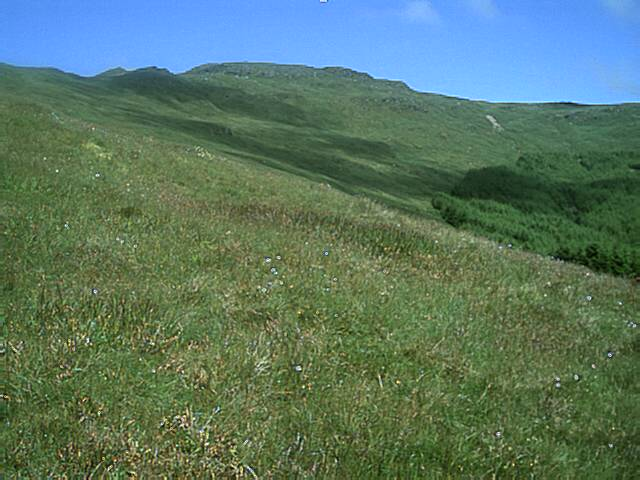
- The summit of Beinn Mhòr, seen from the south

Highest point
- Elevation: 741 m (2,431 ft)
- Prominence: 696 m (2,283 ft)Ranked 61st in British Isles
- Parent peak: Beinn Ime
- Listing: Graham, Marilyn

Naming
- English translation: Big hill
- Pronunciation: Scottish Gaelic: [peɲ ˈvoːɾ]

Geography
- Location: Cowal, Argyll and Bute, Scotland
- OS grid: NS107907
- Topo map: OS Landranger 56

Beinn Mhòr is the highest mountain on the Cowal Peninsula, west of Loch Eck in Argyll and Bute, west of Scotland. It has a high topographic prominence to height ratio and consequently commands a good all round view.

Beinn Mhor is within the Loch Lomond and The Trossachs National Park. To its east, Benmore Botanic Garden makes use of the lower slopes, and includes an outdoor centre in Benmore House.

== Ascents ==
Beinn Mhòr is most frequently and probably most easily ascended from the south, via the end of the public road into Glen Massan. From here, there is a short hike to Glen Massan, followed by about 400 metres of ascent up forestry tracks and paths, from which the climber eventually emerges onto the open hillside. At this point, the climber returning by the same route should note the position, as there are no paths above this point and entering the forest by any other point could mean getting lost in steep and thickly forested terrain. Despite the lack of paths, the upper slopes are gentle and mostly short grass which provide easy ascent to the summit.

An alternative longer route ascends from the car park of Benmore Botanic Garden, with a track leading up to the steep grassy slopes of A' Cruach and the secondary tops of Creachan Beag and Creachan Mòr to a wide shoulder leading to the summit of Beinn Mhòr itself.
