= Argyll Forest Park =

Park in Argyll and Bute, Scotland

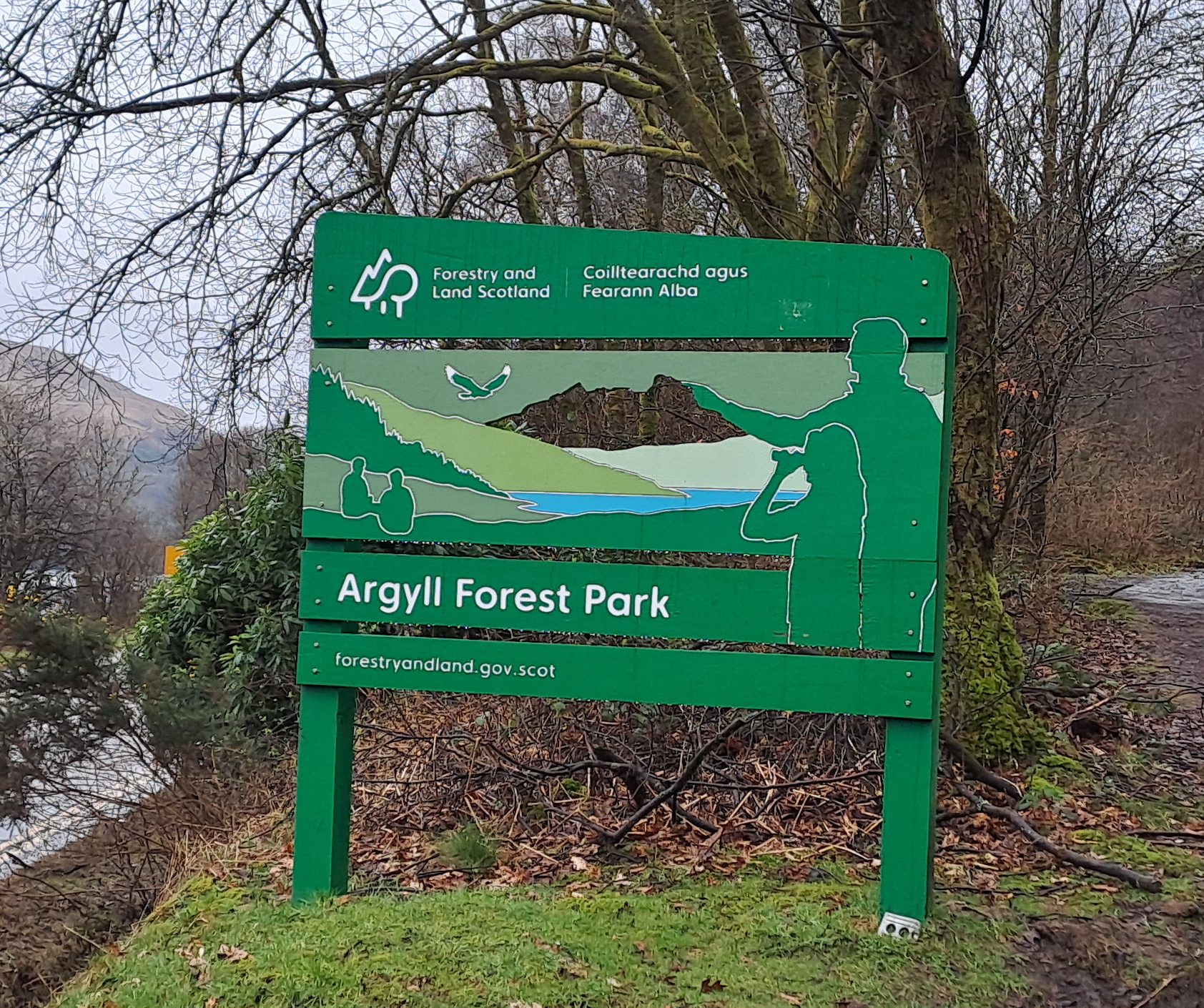

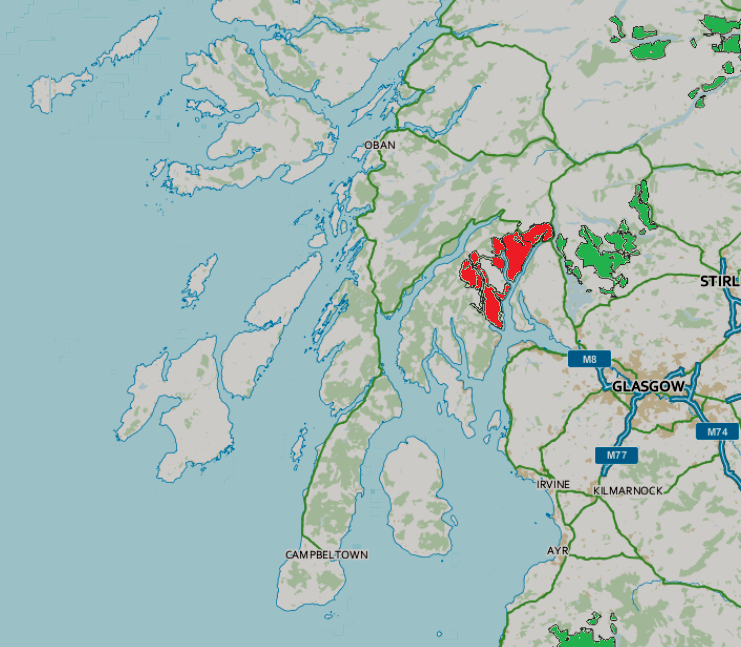
- A map showing the location of the Argyll Forest Park (in red, other forests parks shown in green).
- Location: Cowal peninsula, Argyll and Bute
- Nearest city: Glasgow
- Coordinates: 56.135°N 5.041°W
- Area: 21,133 ha (81.59 sq mi)
- Established: 1935
- Governing body: Forestry and Land Scotland

Argyll Forest Park is a forest park located on the Cowal Peninsula in Argyll and Bute, Scottish Highlands. Established in 1935, it was the first forest park to be created in the United Kingdom. The park is managed by Forestry and Land Scotland, and covers 211 km^{2} in total.

From the Holy Loch in the south to the Arrochar Alps in the north, the park includes a variety of landscapes, from high peaks to freshwater and seawater lochs.

Much of the forest park lies within the Loch Lomond and The Trossachs National Park, which was established in 2002; however, the forests at Corlarach and Ardyne in Cowal are outwith the national park boundary but within the forest park.

== Gallery ==
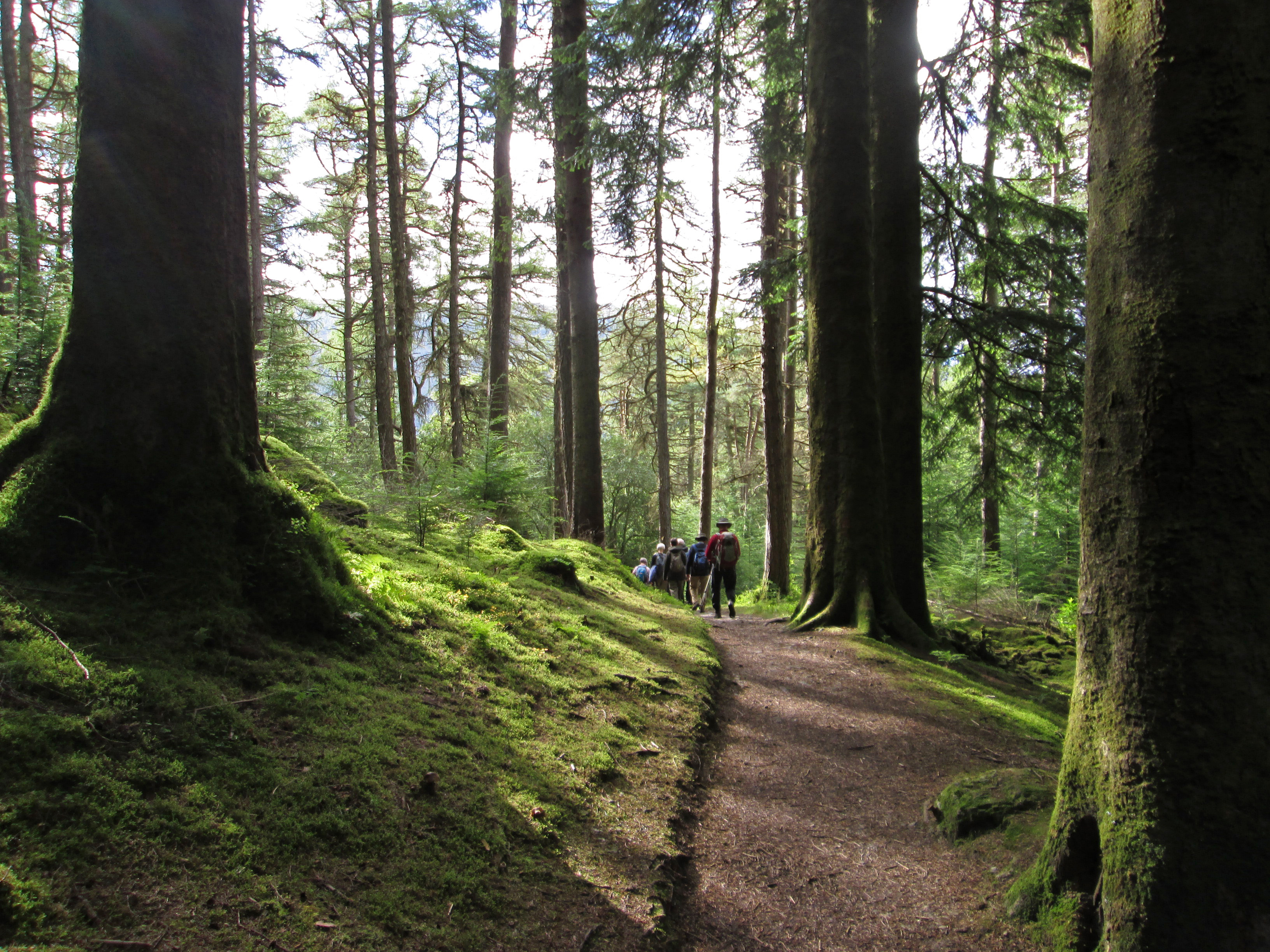
Benmore forest

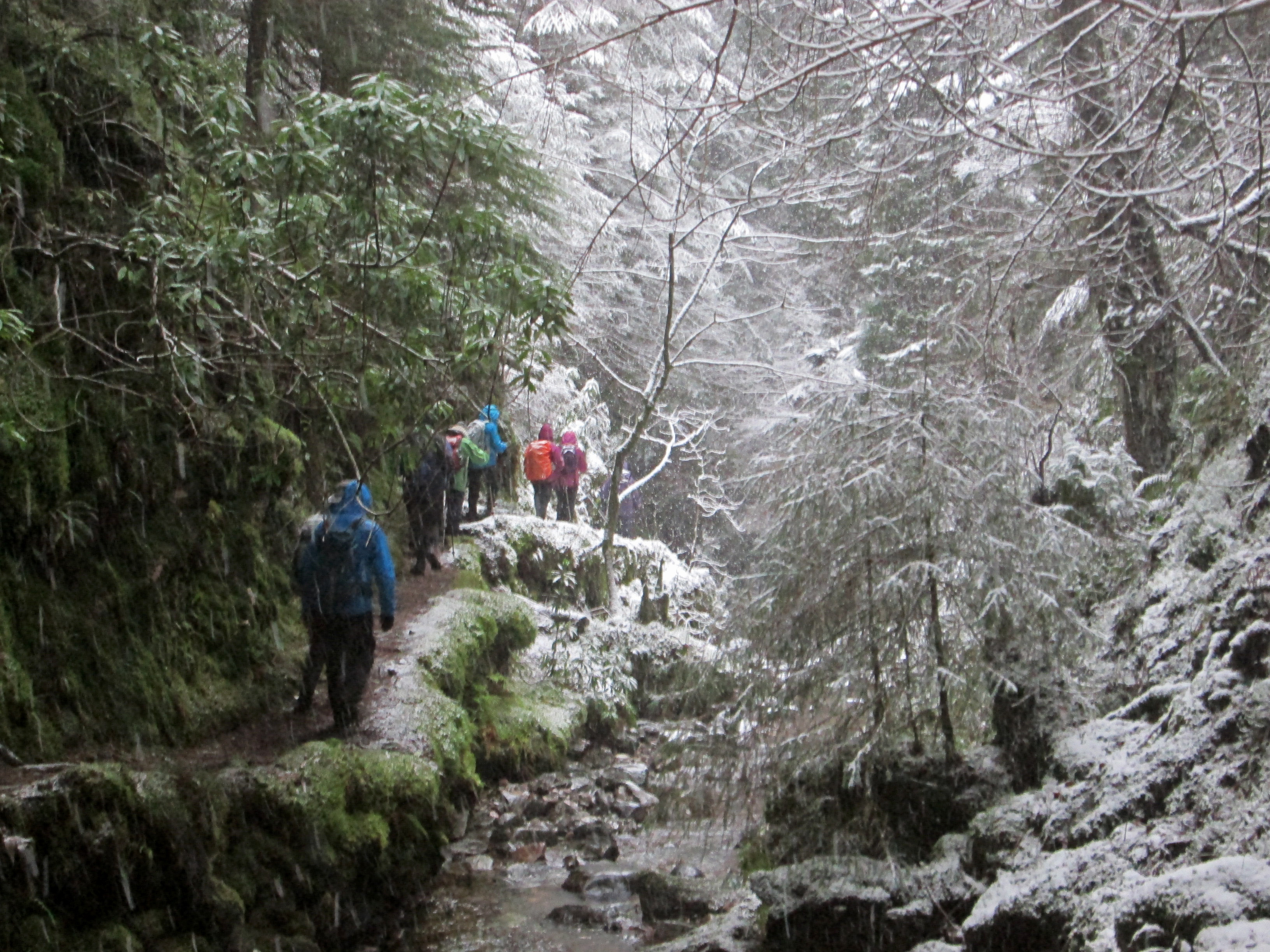
Puck's Glen ravine, in winter

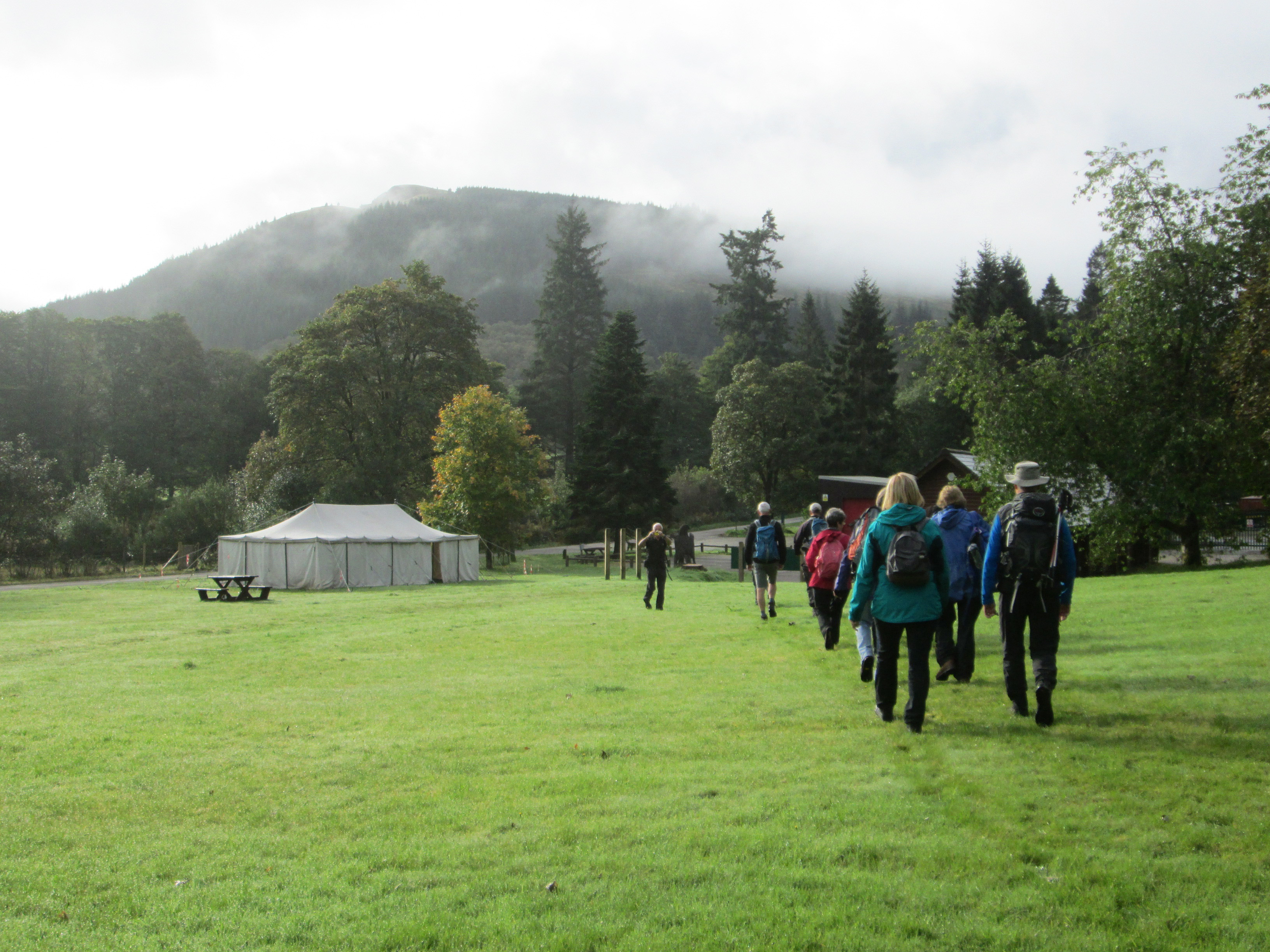
Glenbranter

== Highlights ==
Forestry and Land Scotland highlight trails at the following places:

- Glenbranter, bike trails and walks, featuring ancient oaks
- Puck's Glen, trail up rocky gorge among woodlands
- Benmore, forest around Benmore Botanic Garden, with giant trees
- Kilmun Arboretum, collection of tree species in woodland groves
- Ardentinny, easy trails and beach walk
