= Kilmun =

Village in Argyll and Bute, Scotland

Coordinates: 55.994125°N 4.933859°W

Kilmun: Scottish Gaelic: Cill Mhunna
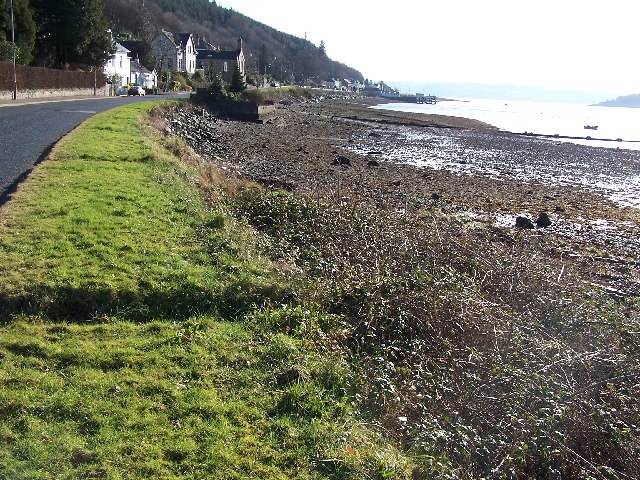
- Kilmun looking east along the Holy Loch shoreline towards Strone.

- Location within Argyll and Bute
- OS grid reference: NS 17000 81700
- Council area: Argyll and Bute
- Lieutenancy area: Argyll and Bute
- Country: Scotland
- Sovereign state: United Kingdom
- Post town: DUNOON, ARGYLL
- Postcode district: PA23
- Dialling code: 01369
- UK Parliament: Argyll, Bute and South Lochaber
- Scottish Parliament: Argyll and Bute

Kilmun (Scottish Gaelic: Cill Mhunna) is a linear settlement on the north shore of the Holy Loch in Argyll and Bute, Scotland. It takes its name from the 7th-century monastic community founded by an Irish monk, St Munn (Fintán of Taghmon). The ruin of a 12th-century church still stands beside the Kilmun Parish Church and Argyll Mausoleum.

== Location ==
The village lies on the A880, within the Loch Lomond and The Trossachs National Park. It runs between the head of the sea loch and connects with the village of Strone at Strone Point, where the sea loch joins the Firth of Clyde.

== History ==
As a settlement, Kilmun is substantially older than most of its neighbours. Like them, it developed as a watering-place (a summer pleasure resort/spa with sea bathing for well off Glasgow families) after 1827, when a quay was built by the marine engineer David Napier to connect to his "new route" to Inveraray which included a steam ship on Loch Eck. The pier was a regular stop for the Clyde steamer services until its closure in 1971. A ferry also used to cross the loch to and from Lazaretto Point in Ardnadam.

=== Kilmun Parish Church and Argyll Mausoleum ===
Consists of St Munn's Church (a Category-A-listed building and Kilmun's parish church of the Church of Scotland), as well as the adjacent mausoleum of the Dukes of Argyll and a historically significant churchyard. The complex is located on the summit of a slight knoll about ten metres from the shoreline of the Holy Loch. The existing church dates from 1841 and occupies the site of an older, medieval church. A partly ruined tower from the medieval period still stands to the west of the present building.

== Kilmun Arboretum ==
Kilmun is also home to an extensive arboretum managed by the Forestry and Land Scotland. Established in the 1930s to monitor the success of a variety of exotic tree species in the humid west coast environment, it includes specimens of Sequoia, Japanese Larch, Araucaria araucana (monkey puzzle) and Japanese Chestnut amongst many others from around the world. A series of woodland walks have been established of varying gradients and degrees of difficulty, which link by a forestry track to Benmore wood at the top of Puck's Glen.

== Decline ==
The population for the Benmore and Kilmun area was recorded as 1,030 in the 2001 census. That showed a decline of 99 people (9.69%) in the ten years since the 1991 census.

== Notable residents ==
- Australian politician Gregor McGregor (1848–1914) was born in Kilmun.
- The artist George Rowlett (1941–2026) lived in Kilmun as a child.

== See also ==
- Old Kilmun House

== Gallery ==
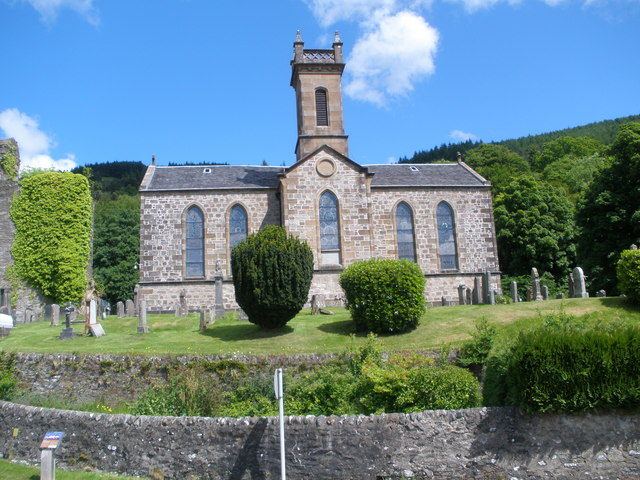
Church of Scotland, Kilmun

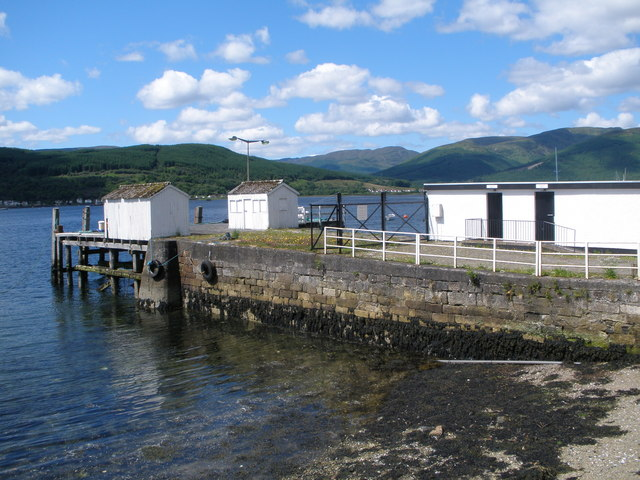
Kilmun Pier

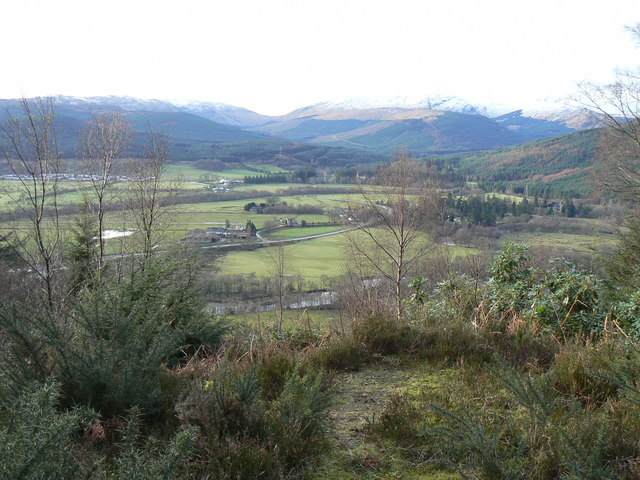
View from Kilmun Arboretum Track
