= Loch Eck =

Lake in Argyll and Bute, Scotland

- Loch Eich (Scottish Gaelic)
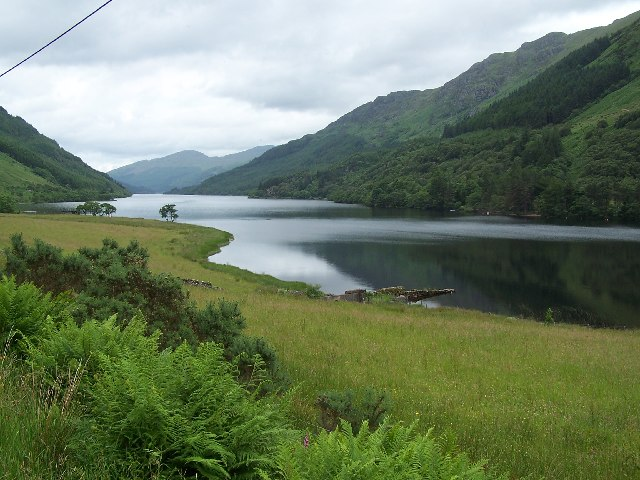
- A view of the loch, looking north.

- Location within Argyll and Bute

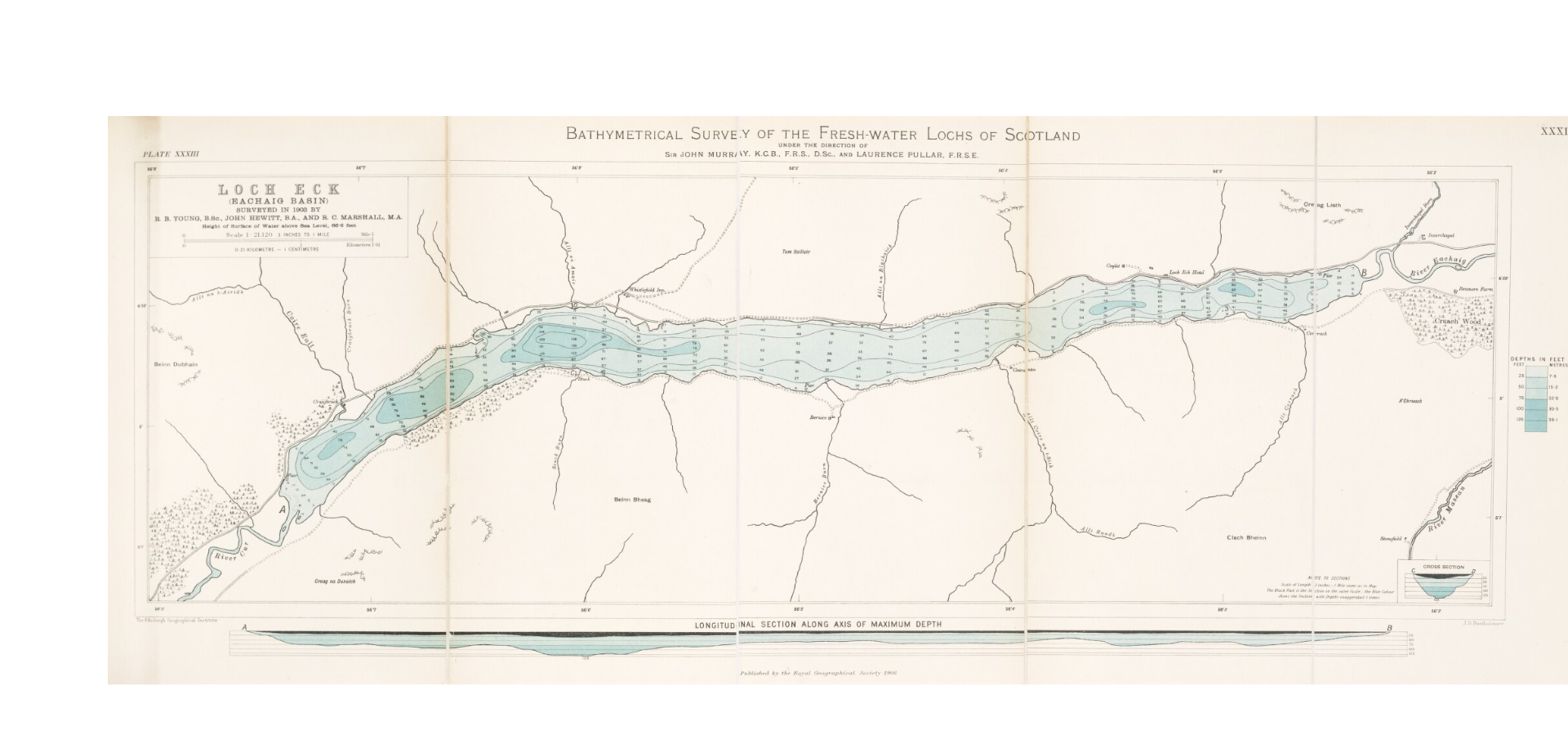
- Location: Argyll and Bute, Scotland.
- Coordinates: 56.079508°N 4.9944191°W; National grid reference NS 13753 91453
- Type: Freshwater Loch and Reservoir.
- Primary inflows: River Cur
- Primary outflows: River Eachaig
- Catchment area: 139.9 km^{2} (54.0 sq mi)
- Basin countries: Scotland, United Kingdom.
- Designation: Site of Special Scientific Interest
- Surface area: 4,259,000 m^{2} (45,840,000 sq ft)
- Max. depth: 43 m (141 ft)
- Water volume: 67,400,000 m^{3} (2.38×10^{9} cu ft)
- Surface elevation: 24 m (79 ft)

Loch Eck (Gaelic: Loch Eich) is a freshwater loch located on the Cowal Peninsula, north of Dunoon, in Argyll and Bute, west of Scotland. It is seven miles (11 kilometres) long. It is oriented in a north-south direction. Its main inflow, at the northern end, is the River Cur, and its main outflow, at the southern end, is the River Eachaig, which meanders somewhat within the confines of the broad strath before flowing into the head of Holy Loch, about 5 km further south.

Along with Loch Lomond, it is the only naturally occurring habitat of the powan (fish), although it is closely related to the gwyniad and other similar fish. The loch also has salmon, sea trout, brown trout and arctic char.

Loch Eck is within the Argyll Forest Park, which is itself part of the Loch Lomond and The Trossachs National Park. It is close to the Benmore Botanic Garden and the Benmore Outdoor Centre, which uses the loch and its surrounding for outdoor learning.

The A815 road bounds the east side. A pathway runs along the west side of the loch, and gives access to the Paper Caves, set in the steep hillside with caving access to a platform set above a steep scarp within the cave. A legend holds that the Argyll family documents were hidden in the caves when the 9th Earl of Argyll was arrested, to prevent his lands from being made forfeit.

The loch is an impounding reservoir, with a low concrete dam. Construction work began in 1974. The Loch Eck water treatment works opened in 1977, upgraded in 2012 by Scottish Water, which supplies the freshwater to much of the southeast of Cowal, including Dunoon.

In July 2013, two dogs died due to algal bloom present in the loch. Warnings were then posted advising that people and animals should avoid contact with the water. There were three further incidents: one in June 2019 and two in July 2021.

The actress Emma Thompson owns a house on the shore of the loch.

== See also ==
- List of reservoirs and dams in the United Kingdom

== Sources ==
- ARGYLL AND BUTE COUNCIL RESERVOIRS ACT 1975 PUBLIC REGISTER
- Gazetteer for Scotland - Historical Perspective for Loch Eck
