= Kilmodan Carved Stones =

Carved stones in Scotland

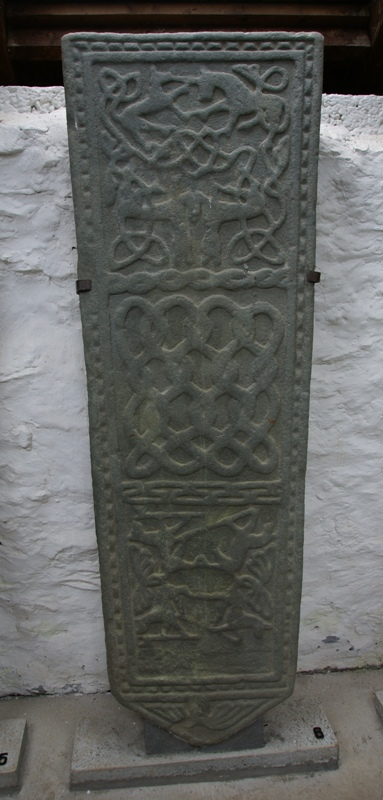
- Kilmodan Sculptured Stones 20100927 no. 6
- Interactive map of Kilmodan Carved Stones
- 56.008513°N 5.2174031°W
- Location: Glendaruel
- Nearest city: Clachan of Glendaruel
- OS grid reference: NR 99514 84181

History
- Original use: Grave Markers

Site notes
- Sculptor: Unknown
- Governing body: Historic Scotland

The Kilmodan Carved Stones are a group of West Highland carved grave slabs exhibited in a burial aisle within Kilmodan Churchyard, Clachan of Glendaruel, in the Cowal Peninsula, in Argyll and Bute, west of Scotland. They are in the care of Historic Scotland.

== Gallery ==
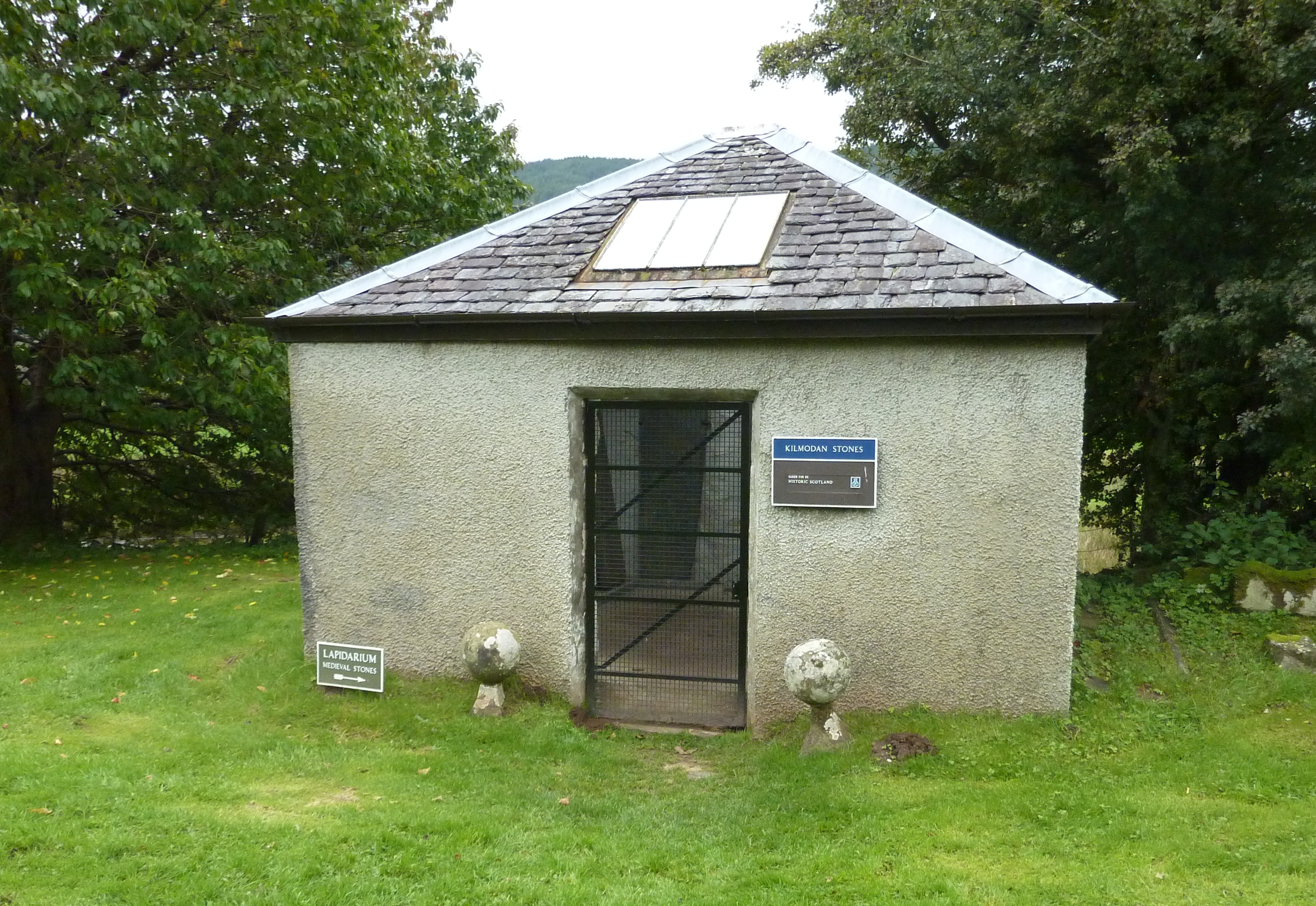

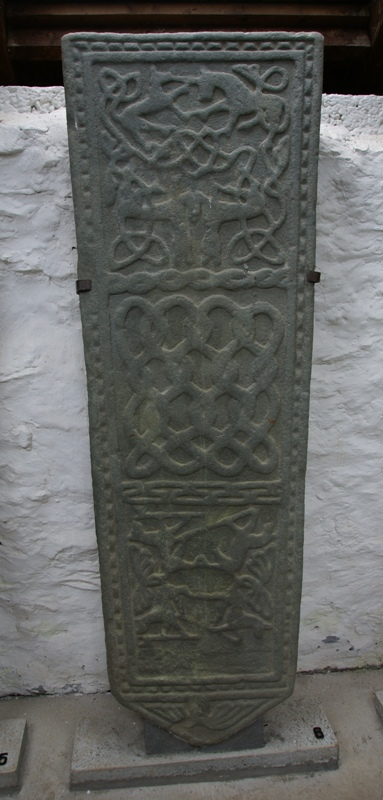

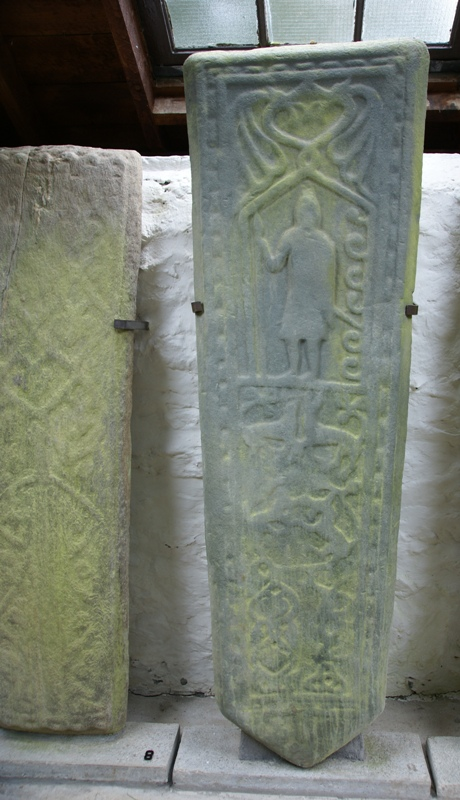

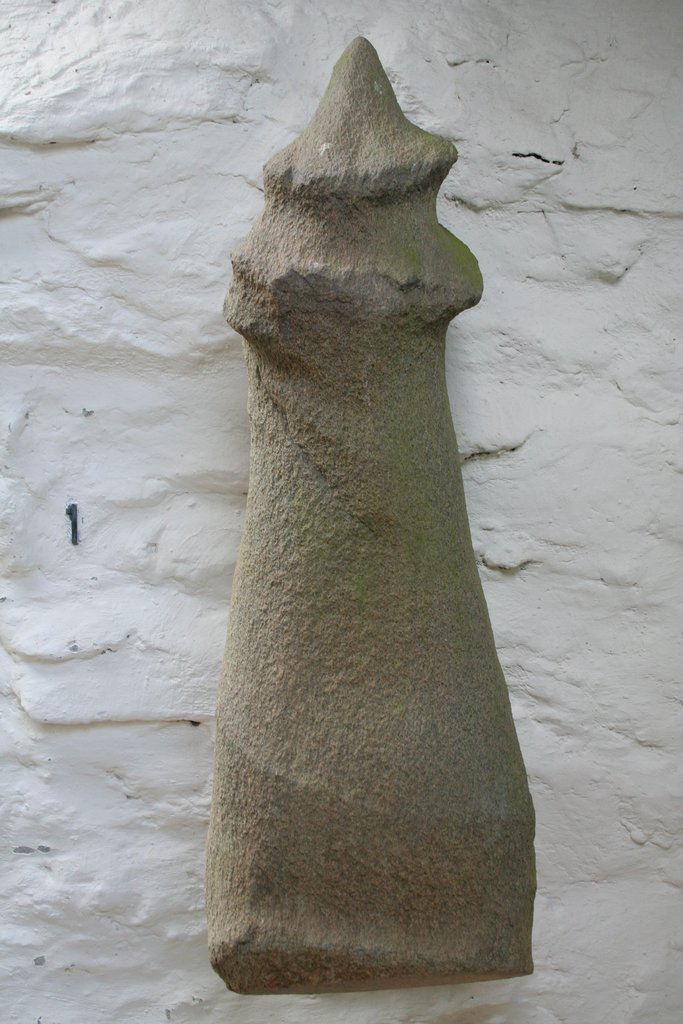

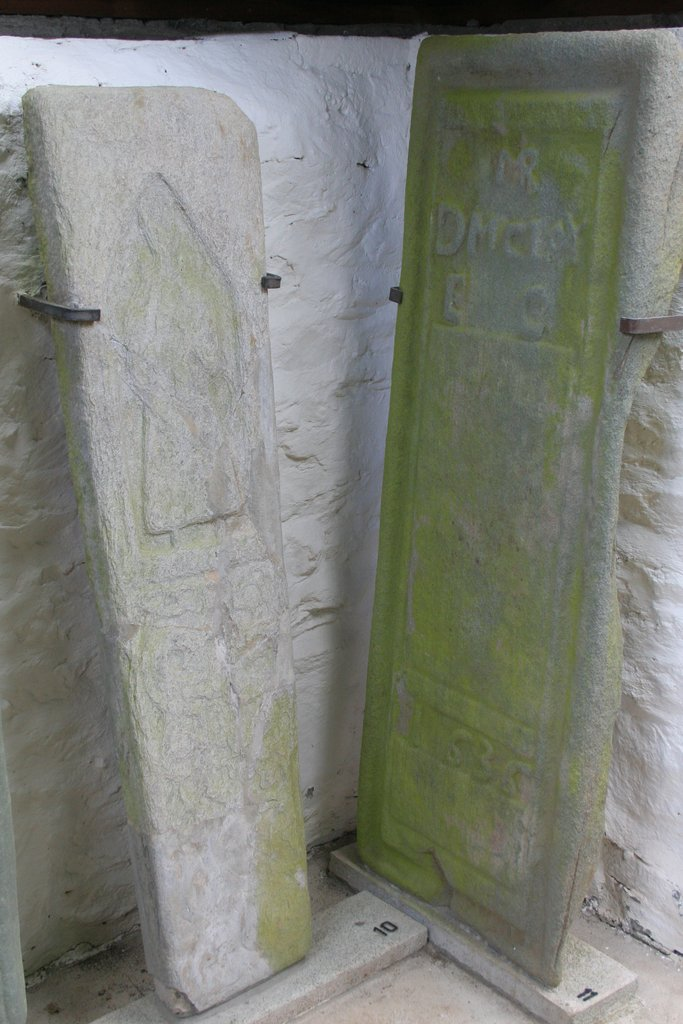

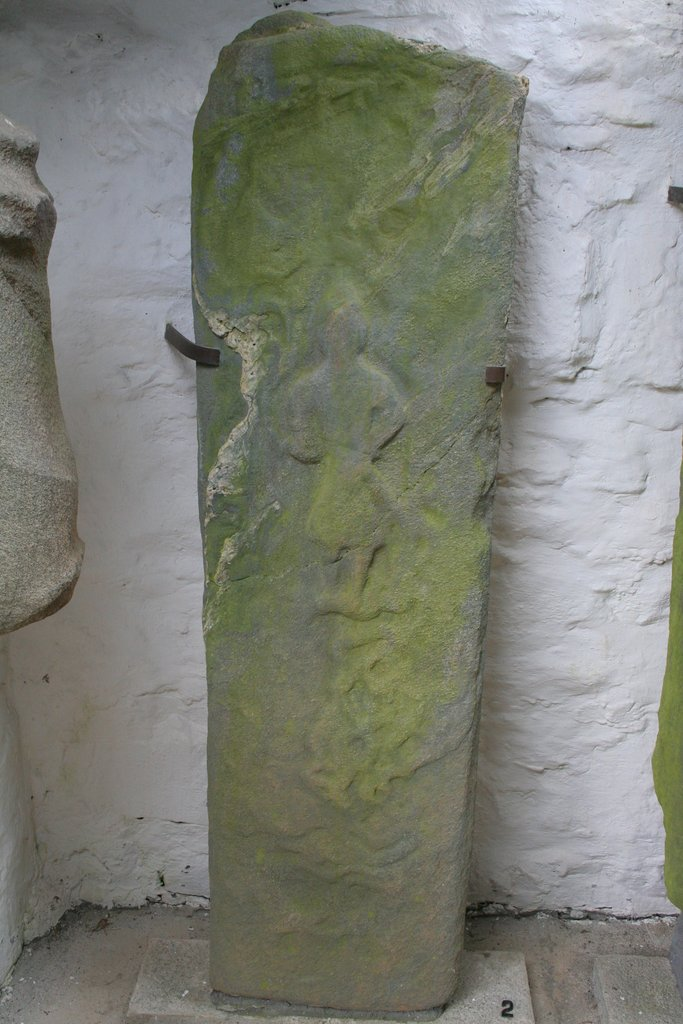

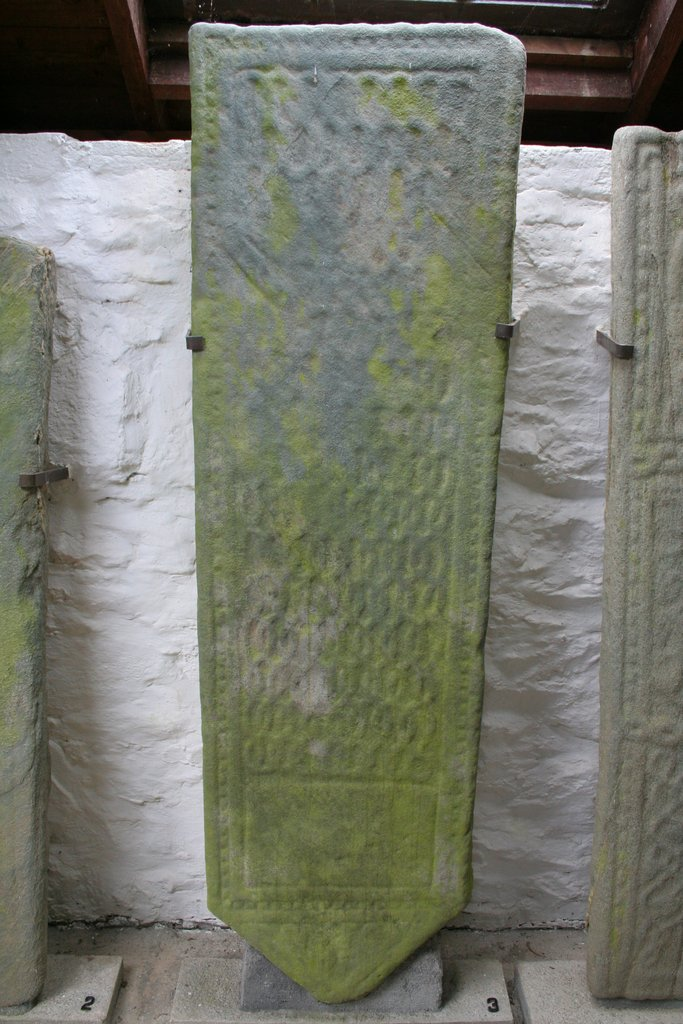

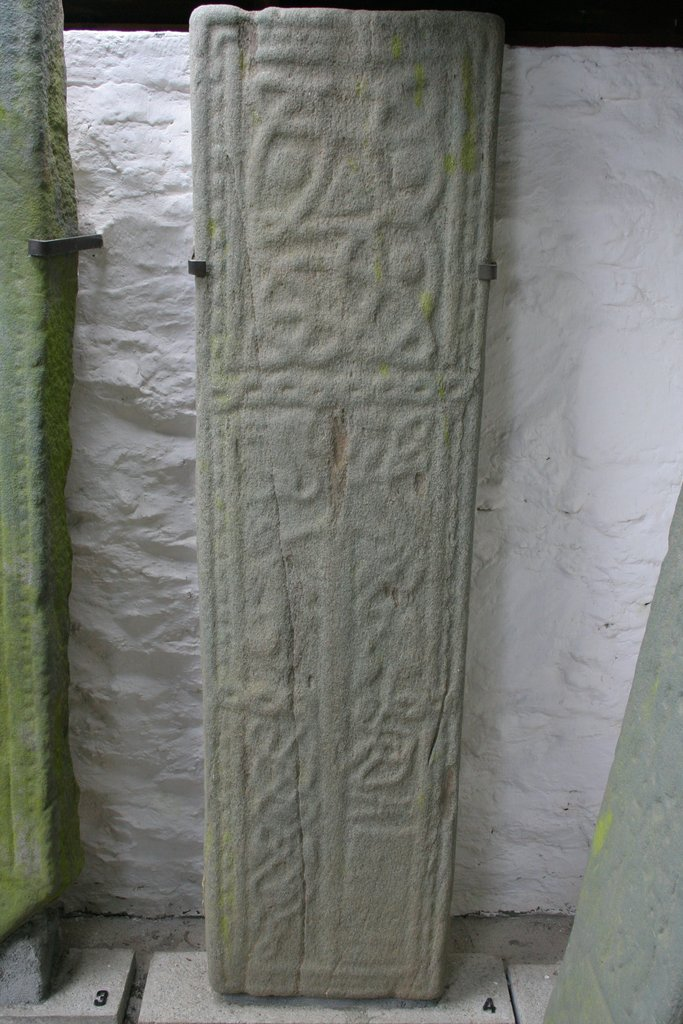

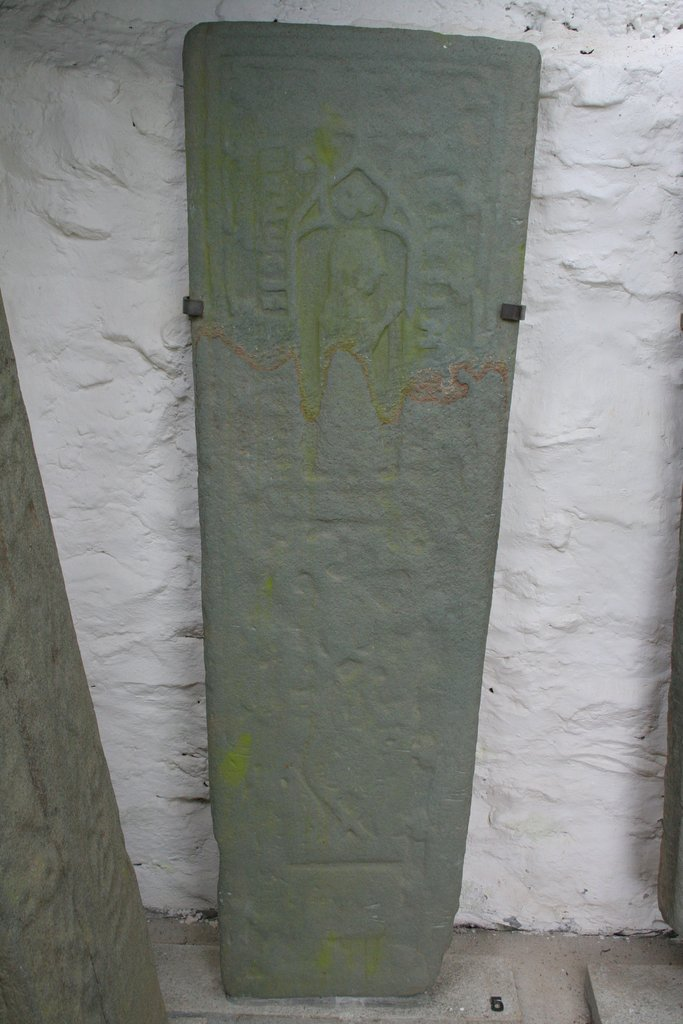

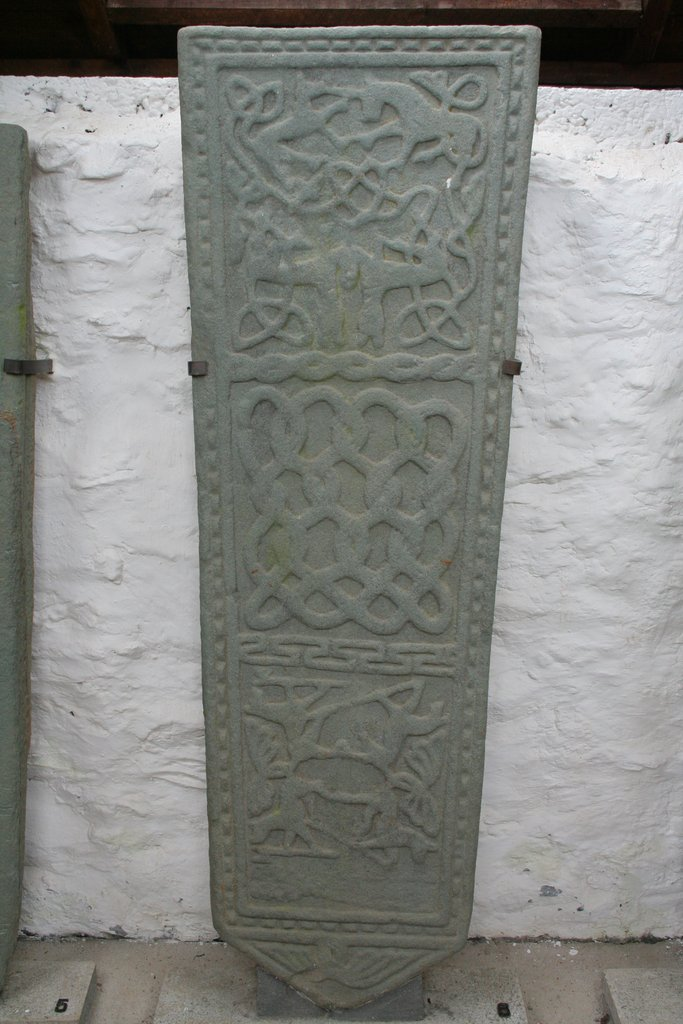

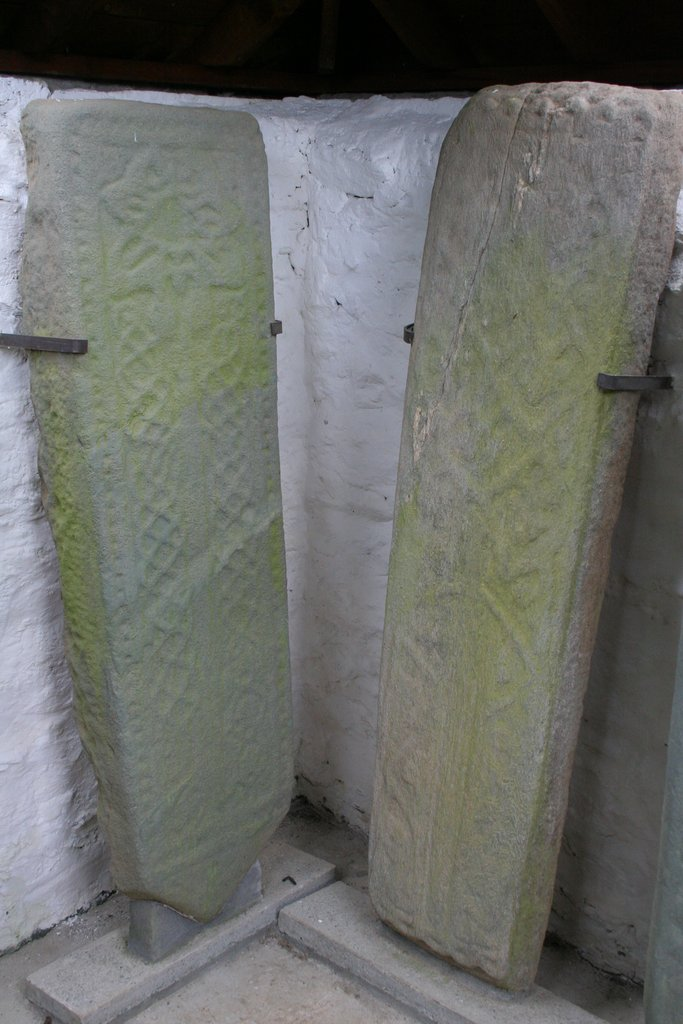

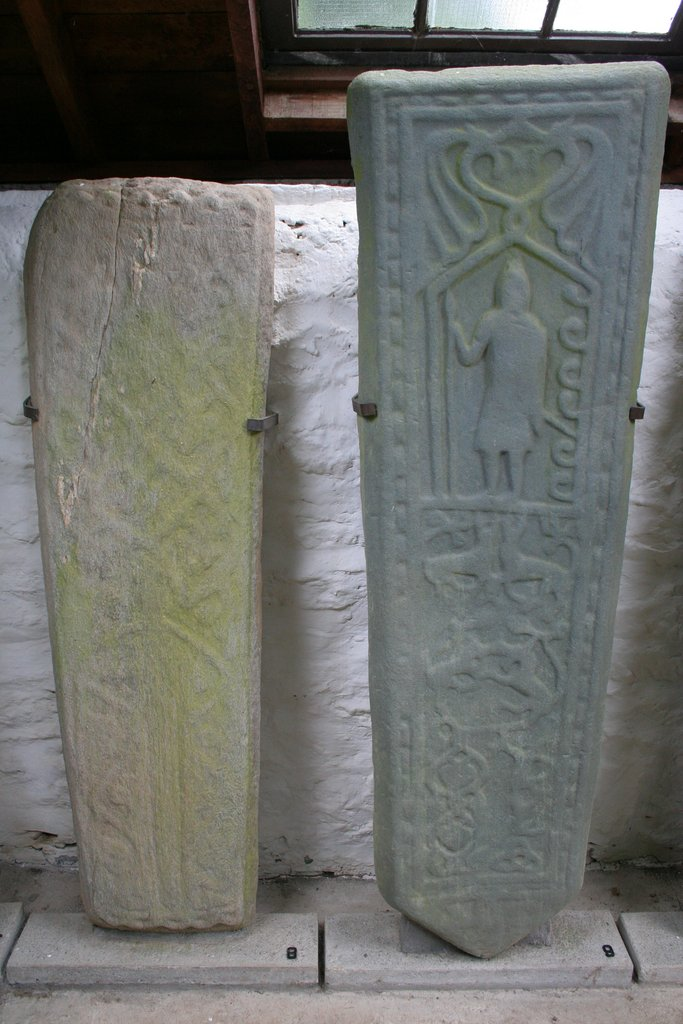

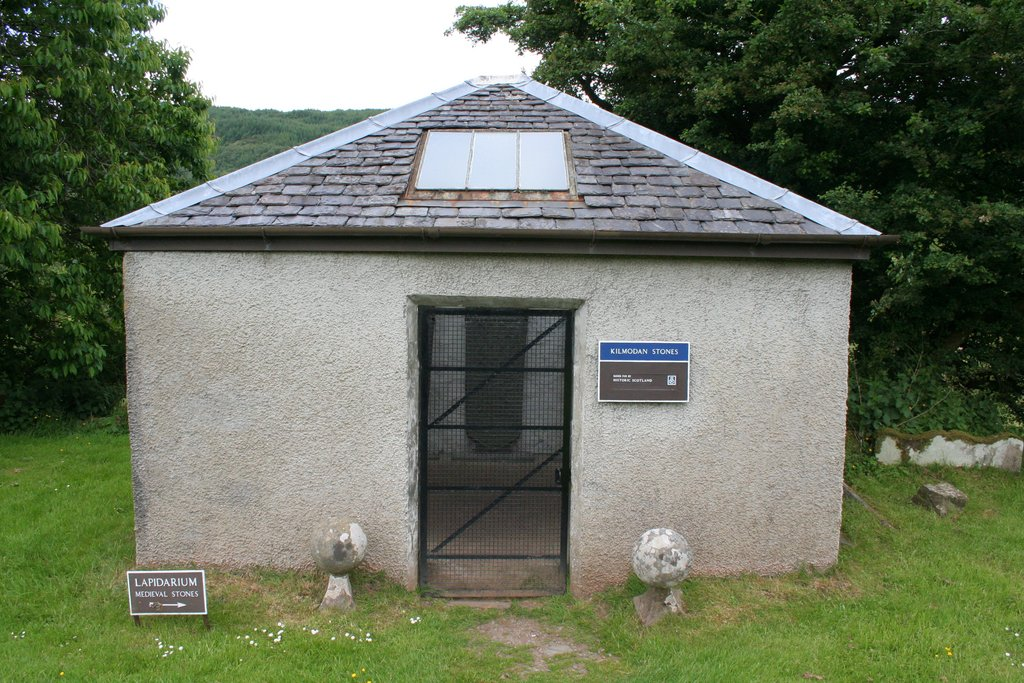
