= William Braikenridge =

Scottish cleric and mathematician

William Braikenridge (also Brakenridge) (c. 1700–1762) was a Scottish mathematician and cleric, a Fellow of the Royal Society from 1752.

== Life ==
He was son of John Braikenridge of Glasgow. In the 1720s he taught mathematics in Edinburgh.

Braikenridge was Honorary A.M. in 1735, and D.D. in 1739, of Marischal College, when he was vicar of New Church, Isle of Wight. He was incorporated at The Queen's College, Oxford, in 1741. He became rector of St Michael Bassishaw, and from 1745 librarian of Sion College, in London.

== Works ==
In geometry the Braikenridge–Maclaurin theorem was independently discovered by Colin Maclaurin. It occasioned a priority dispute after Braikenridge published it in 1733; Stella Mills writes that, while Braikenridge may have wished to establish priority, Maclaurin rather felt slighted by the implication that he did not know theorems in the Exercitatio that he had taught for a number of years.

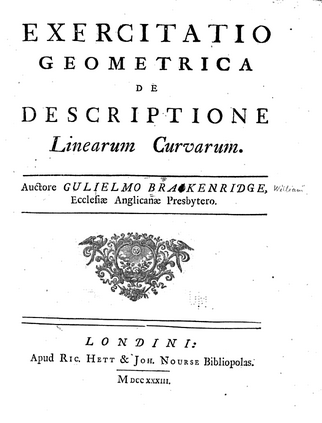

- Exercitatio Geometrica de Descriptione Linearum Curvarum (1733)
- Proposals for lectures on the principles of mechanicks and natural philosophy, by Mr. Braikenridge: Formerly teacher of the mathematicks at Edinburgh (1750?)
- A Letter from the Reverend William Brakenridge, D.D. and F.R.S. to George Lewis Scot, Esq; F. R. S. concerning the Number of Inhabitants within the London Bills of Mortality (1 January 1753), in Philosophical Transactions. This paper was topical, because parliament was considering legislation on a census and registration of vital information. Braikenridge argued, from bills of mortality, that London's population had peaked a decade earlier; a controversy arose with Richard Forster of Great Shefford George Burrington also answered, in 1757. It was argued against Braikenridge that population was increasing, near the area he considered.
- A letter to the right honourable the earl of Macclesfield, president of the Royal society, concerning the method of constructing a table for the probabilities of life at London (1755)
- A Letter to the Right Honourable Hugh Earl of Marchmont. F. R. S. concerning the Sections of a Solid, Hitherto Not Considered by Geometers; From William Brakenridge, D. D. Rector of St. Michael Bassishaw London, and F. R. S. (1759)
- Sermons on Several Subjects by the Late William Brakenridge To which Jane Austen's father, the Rev. George Austen subscribed whilst a fellow of St. John's College.
