= Kilmodan Church =

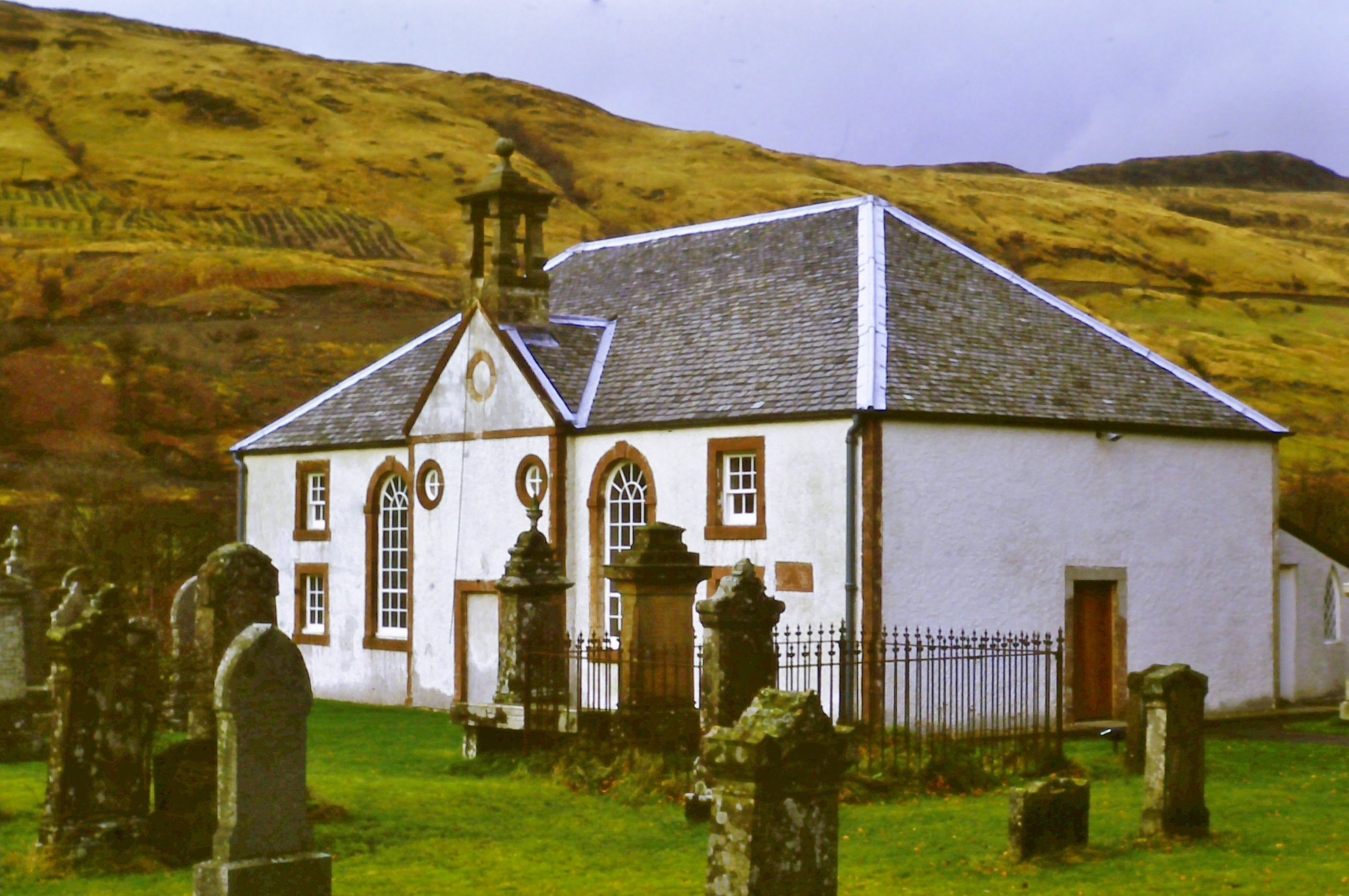
- Kilmodan Church
- Kilmodan Church
- Location: Glendaruel, Cowal peninsula, Argyll and Bute
- Country: Scotland
- Denomination: Church of Scotland

History
- Status: open

Architecture
- Functional status: used
- Heritage designation: Category B
- Designated: 20 July 1971
- Architectural type: Georgian T-plan
- Years built: 1610, 1783

Built in 1783 Kilmodan Church (or Kilmodan Kirk), is in the Clachan of Glendaruel in the Kilmodan parish of the Cowal peninsula, Argyll and Bute, West of Scotland. It is constructed to a Georgian T-plan design and a category B listed building. The walls are inset with shields from the previous church on the site and one is inscribed and dated 'SDC/1610.' There is also a memorial to Rev John Maclaurin (Minister there from 1689 to 1699) and his notable sons (one of whom was Colin Maclaurin). It has a rendered front and both the ends and rear are harled. The building underwent complete restoration in 1983.

The church is still in use though only on a part-time basis, holding services on the 3rd and 4th Sundays of each month.

== Kilmodan Carved Stones ==
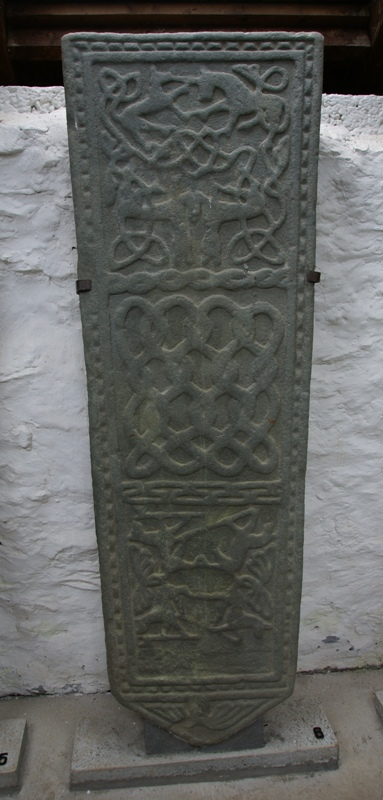
Kilmodan Sculptured Stones 20100927 no. 6

The Kilmodan Carved Stones are located in the surrounding graveyard.

== Ministers ==
- Duncan/Donald McCloy 1609 to 1629
- John Fullarton 1669 to 1684
- John McLaurin 1689 to 1699

== Gallery ==
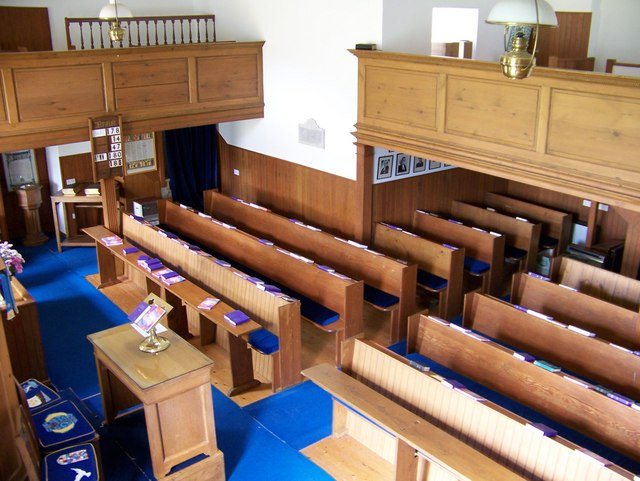

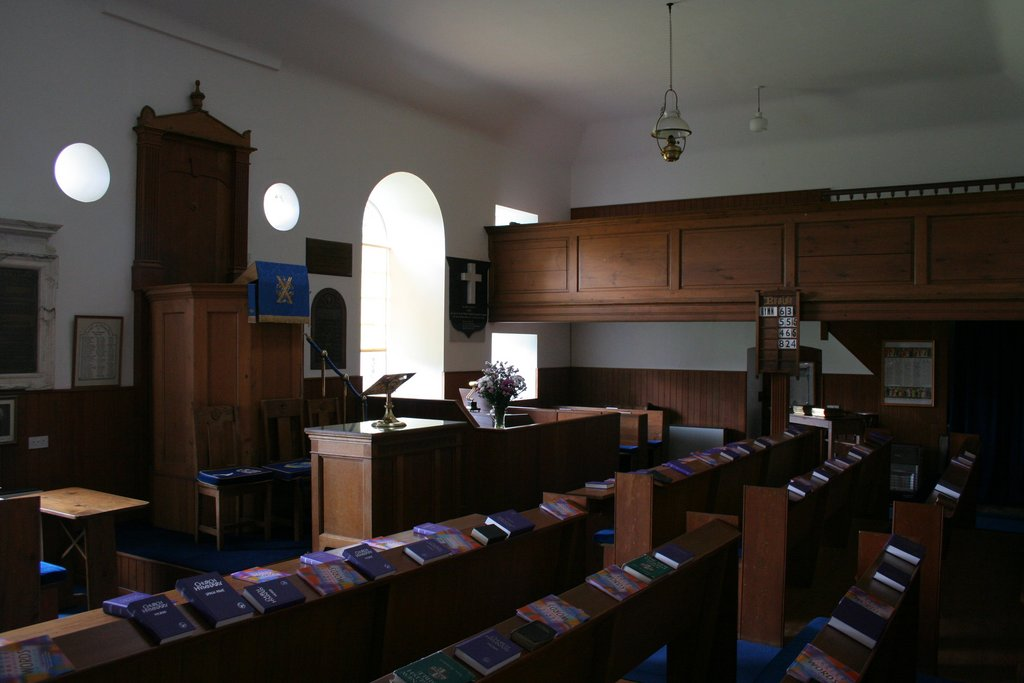
Interior, Kilmodan Church

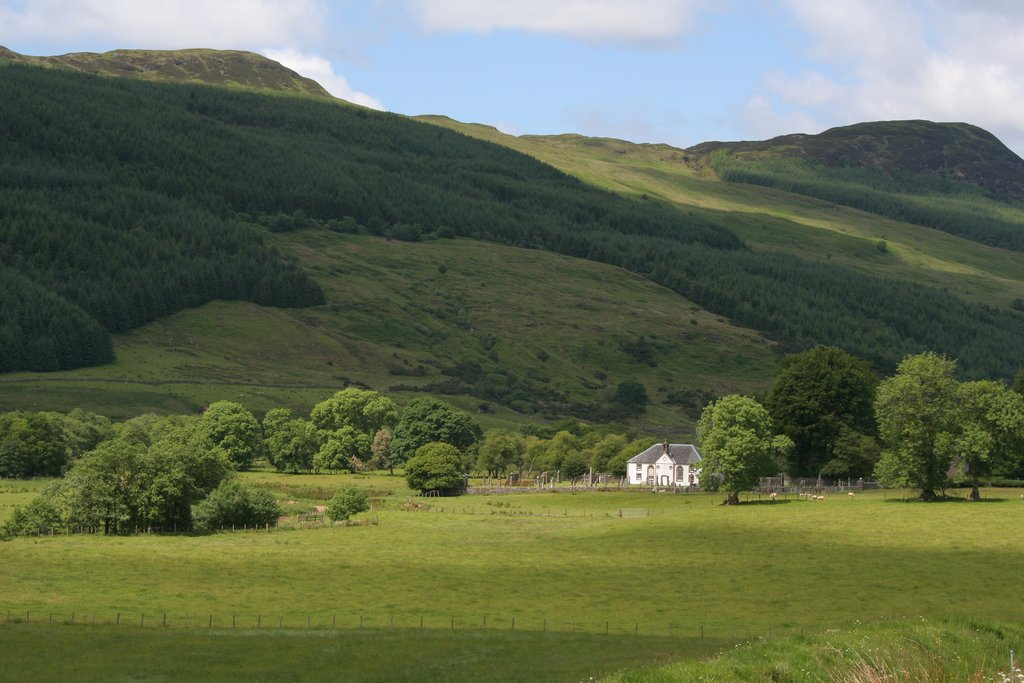
A distant view of Kilmodan Church

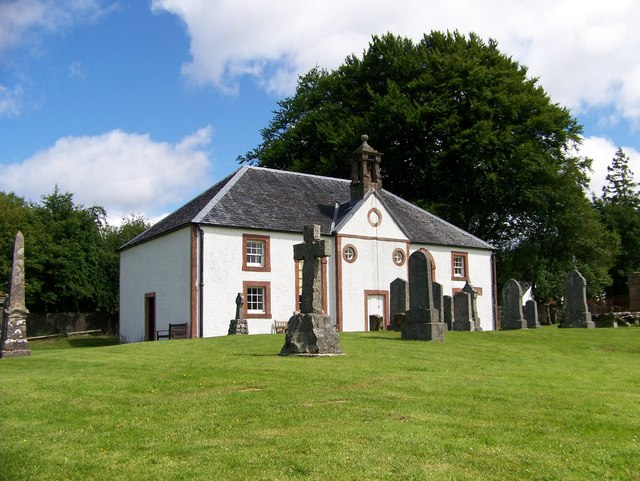

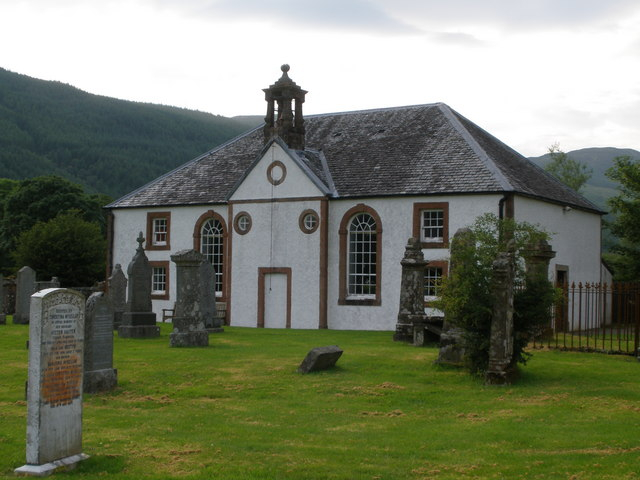

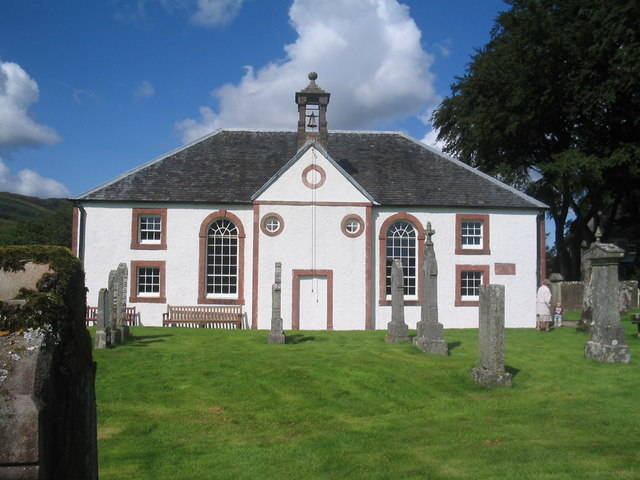

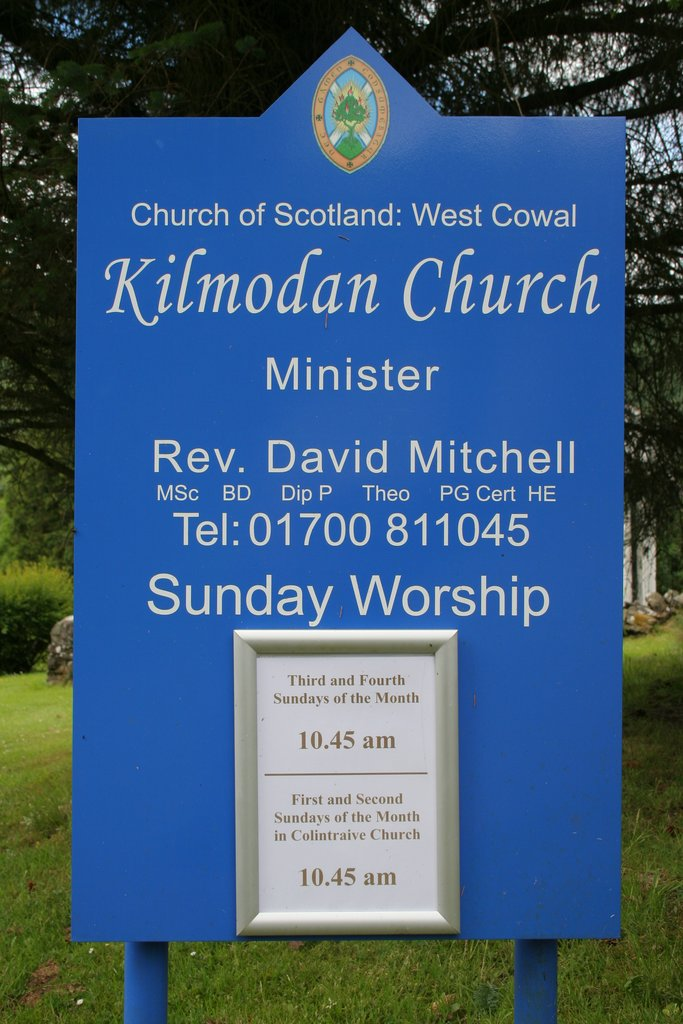
Sign, Kilmodan Church
