= Kirsty McLuckie =

Scottish journalist

Kirsty McLuckie is a Scottish journalist. Since 2007, she has been property editor of The Scotsman. She appeared on the now-axed Fred MacAulay show on Radio Scotland, and was a guest hosts for one week during summer 2010.

Her first job was in an estate agents' in Glasgow during the late 1980s property boom. She moved into selling overseas property and spent two years working in Cyprus. After studying English and Media at Stirling University she joined The Scotsman in 1997 as a news researcher.

Based in Glendaruel, Argyll, her husband is Nicholas Lewis, and they have a son and daughter.
