= Braikenridge–Maclaurin theorem =

Converse to Pascal's theorem In geometry

Elliptic case

Hyperbolic case

In geometry, the Braikenridge–Maclaurin theorem, named for 18th-century British mathematicians William Braikenridge and Colin Maclaurin, is the converse to Pascal's theorem. It states that if the three intersection points of the three pairs of lines through opposite sides of a hexagon lie on a line L, then the six vertices of the hexagon lie on a conic C; the conic may be degenerate, as in Pappus's hexagon theorem.

The Braikenridge–Maclaurin theorem may be applied in the Braikenridge–Maclaurin construction, which is a synthetic construction of the conic defined by five points, by varying the sixth point. Namely, Pascal's theorem states that given six points on a conic (the vertices of a hexagon), the lines defined by opposite sides intersect in three collinear points. This can be reversed to construct the possible locations for a sixth point, given five existing ones.
