= Kilmodan =

Civil parish in Argyll and Bute, Scotland

Coordinates: 56°3′10″N 5°10′15″W

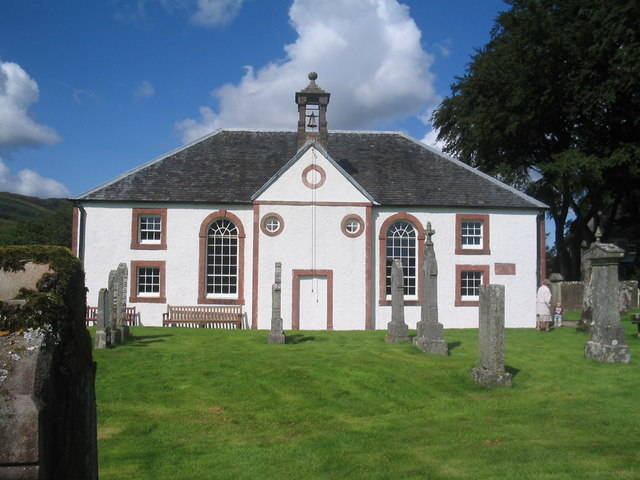
Kilmodan Church, Glendaruel

Kilmodan is a civil parish situated on the Cowal Peninsula, in Argyll and Bute, west of Scotland. It includes the valley of Glendaruel and surrounding areas, with Kilmodan Church located in the Clachan of Glendaruel. The alternative historical spelling, Kilmadan, is no longer used.

The Imperial Gazetteer of Scotland, c. 1857, has this to say about Kilmodan:

Kilmadan (sometimes spelt Kilmodan) is a parish containing the postal station of Glendaruel in Cowal, Argyll. It is in the Presbytery (presbyterian church) of Dunoon and synod of Argyll.

It is bounded by Loch Riddan, and by the parishes of Kilfinan, Strachur, Dunoon, and Inverchaolain. It consists chiefly of a glen, flanked by high hills, and extending southward; and is about 12 miles (19 km) long. The River Ruel traverses the upper part of the glen, and falls into the head of Loch Riddan. The extent of coast is upwards of three miles (5 km) and the scenery is of the grandest description.

The most well-known native of the parish is Colin Maclaurin, professor of mathematics at the University of Edinburgh.

== See also ==
- Auchenbreck Castle
- List of places in Argyll and Bute
