= St Michael Bassishaw =

Coordinates: 51°31′0.1″N 0°5′30″W

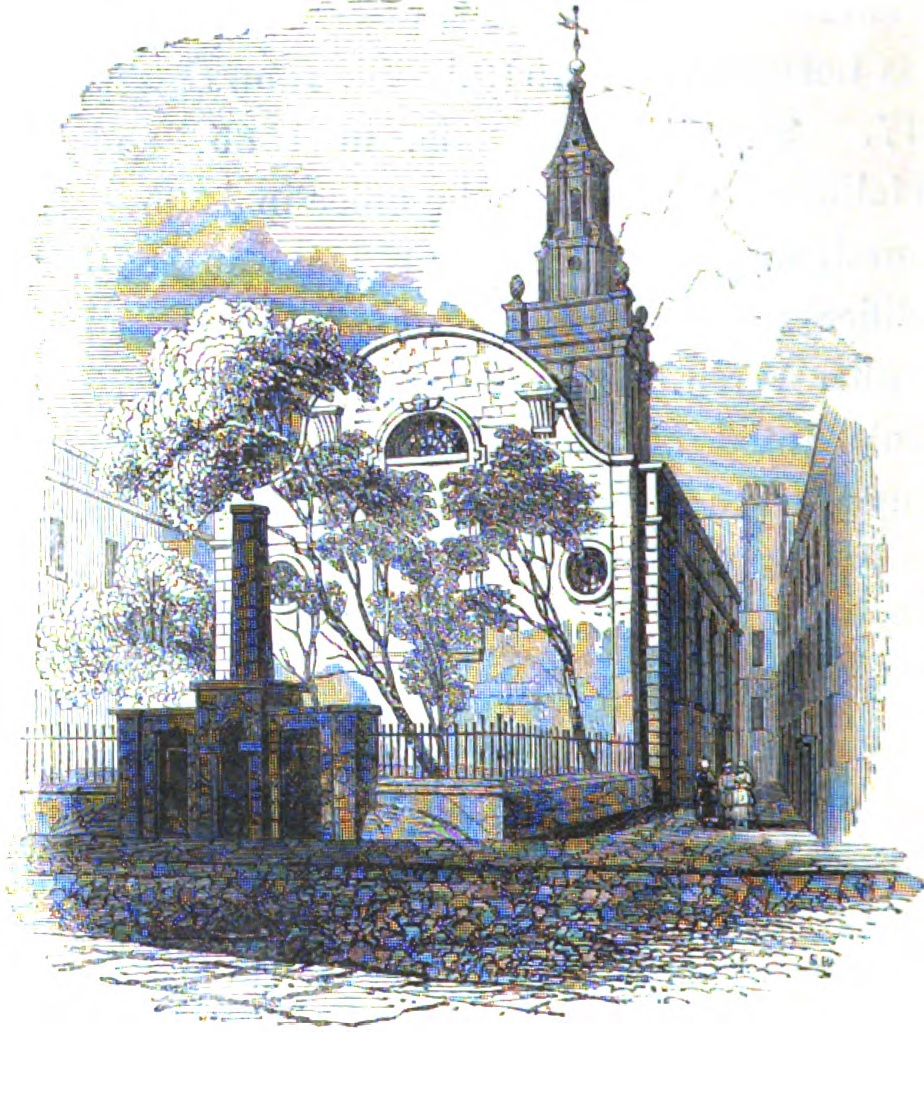
- St Michael Bassishaw from The Churches of London by George Godwin (1839)
- St Michael Bassishaw
- Location: Basinghall Street, London
- Country: England
- Denomination: Church of England

Architecture
- Architect: Christopher Wren
- Style: Baroque
- Demolished: 1900

St Michael Bassishaw, or Basinshaw, was a parish church in Basinghall Street in the City of London, standing on land now occupied by the Barbican Centre complex. Recorded since the 12th century, the church was destroyed in the Great Fire of 1666, then rebuilt by the office of Sir Christopher Wren. The rebuilt church was demolished in 1900.

== History ==
St Michael Bassishaw was one of seven churches in the City of London dedicated to the Archangel Michael.

The earliest surviving reference to the church is in a deed of 1196, as "St Michael de Bassishaghe". This has been interpreted as Basing's haw, in which Basing is the name of a prominent family in medieval London and 'haw' means yard.

The north wall of the 12th-century church was built over Roman and medieval rubbish pits, so that it had to be strengthened by buttresses. This was established by excavations in the late 19th century and in 1965.

A 14th-century parish priest of St Michael's, by the name of William, dug a ditch outside the church to assert his ownership and control of the right of way, but was obliged by the Corporation of London to fill it in again.

The church was rebuilt in the 15th century. John Burton, a mercer, and his wife Agnes were major contributors to the cost "as appeared by his mark placed throughout the whole roof of the Choir, and the middle Isle of the Church". Burton died in 1460 and was buried in the choir of the new church.

From the fifteenth century, the dean and chapter of St Paul's Cathedral were patrons of the parish, meaning they appointed its clergy.

A chapel was built on the north side of the choir by Sir James Yerford (or Yarford), Lord Mayor in 1520. He was buried there in 1527. The building restored in 1630, but all was lost in the Great Fire of 1666.

In 1662, Francis Hall, a chaplain to Charles II, was appointed as Rector. He fled the parish on the outbreak of the Great Plague of London in 1665, and returned only in 1670 to collect his stipend. His substitute, a priest called Williams, succumbed to the plague in September 1665, along with his wife and three children.

== 17th century rebuilding ==
Following the Great Fire of London, a new church designed by Wren was begun in 1675 and was completed four years later. The contractor, John Fitch, encountered problems with the foundations at the east end, so removed them and piled the ground. The walls were faced with brick, instead of the usual stone, and there were load-bearing Corinthian columns. Fitch's work was unsatisfactory to the parish, and his columns were later described as "specimens of... jerry-building... made up of several sorts of materials and plastered over." By 1693, the parish was lobbying Wren to pay for repairs. By 1700, the church was being shored up and was in need of repair. This was undertaken in 1713, when the upper parts of the walls were taken down and rebuilt, the slate roof was replaced with a lead roof, and a steeple was added. The total cost of rebuilding was £5,704, then a gigantic sum.

The tower, also of brick, was to the west of the church. The steeple, probably designed by Robert Hooke, took the form of an octagonal drum surmounted by a lantern, from which emerged a trumpet-shaped cone. On top of this was a ball and finial, which survived the demolition and are now on the spire of St Andrew-by-the-Wardrobe.

In 1839, George Godwin described St Michael's as "a plain substantial building without any striking features". It was 70 feet long and 50 feet wide, divided into a nave and aisles by Corinthian columns, which supported an elaborate entablature and a coved ceiling. The plan was irregular, and the building was smaller than the pre-Fire church. The main front was on the east side, facing onto Basinghall Street, and was unadorned except for a large round-headed window flanked by two round windows.

In 1821, the brickwork was rendered with stucco and pointed in imitation of stone.

== Burials ==
- Sir John Gresham, 1556
- Thomas Storer, 1604
- Thomas Wharton, anatomist, 1673
- William Braikenridge, mathematician, 1762

The Harleian Society copied the parish registers and compiled a series of books in 1944. Volume 74. The work was transcribed and edited by A. W. Hughes Clarke F.S.A. It lists the baptisms, marriages and burials in this parish between 1733 and 1852. It comprises 189 pages of names dates and other details.

== Demolition ==
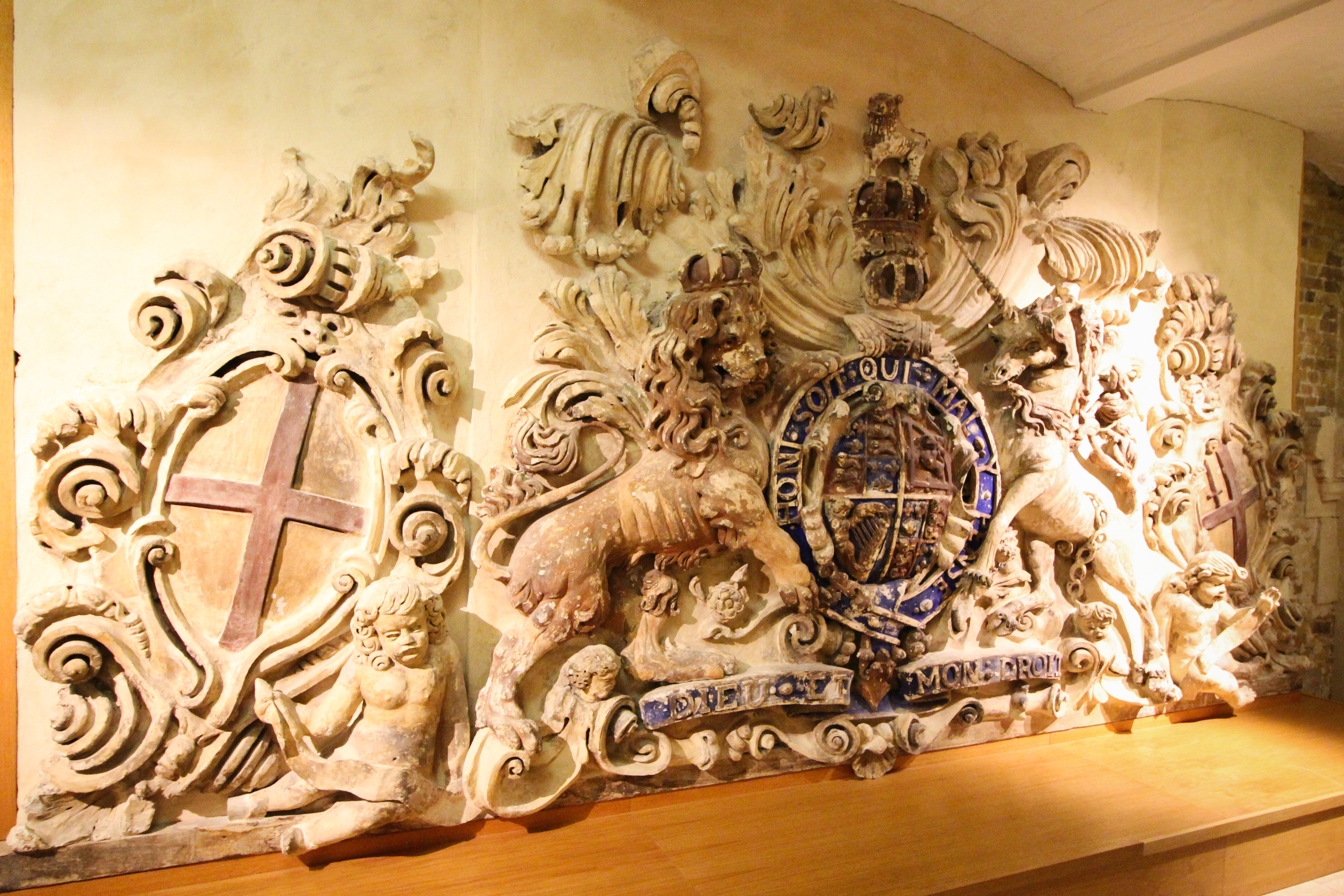
Royal coat of arms in the Guildhall, London

In the late 19th century, sanitary regulations obliged the church to clear its crypt of human remains. The work revealed the weakness of the foundations, and in 1892 the church was judged unsafe and was closed, its parish combined with that of St Lawrence Jewry. St Michael Bassishaw was demolished in 1900 and the land sold to the City of London Corporation for £36,000. "Part of the proceeds was used to build two new churches in Edmonton in North London: St Aldhelm's, Silver Street, London, N18 (consecrated 1903), and St Michael's, Bury Street, London, N9 (consecrated 1901), both to the designs of W. D. Caroe. St Michael's was declared redundant in 1982 and converted into apartments.

An office building called Bassishaw House was built on the site of the City church. This was demolished in 1965. An archaeological excavation was carried out, during which some remains of the church's mediaeval foundations were uncovered. Today the site once occupied by St Michael's lies beneath the courtyard of the Guildhall offices and the Barbican highwalk.

A plaster royal coat of arms from St Michael Bassishaw – the grandest of those in any Wren church – can now be found in the Guildhall complex. The weathervane went to St Andrew-by-the-Wardrobe and the organ to King's College, Taunton.

== See also ==
- List of Christopher Wren churches in London
- List of churches rebuilt after the Great Fire but since demolished
