= Glendaruel =

Coordinates: 56.011626°N 5.2152786°W

Glendaruel: Scottish Gaelic: Gleann Dà Ruadhail
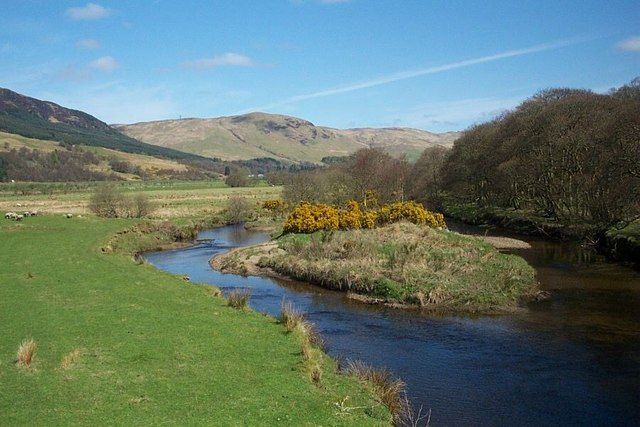
- River at Clachan of Glendaruel.

- Location within Argyll and Bute
- OS grid reference: NR 99662 84521
- Council area: Argyll and Bute
- Lieutenancy area: Argyll and Bute
- Country: Scotland
- Sovereign state: United Kingdom
- Post town: COLINTRAIVE
- Postcode district: PA22
- Dialling code: 01369
- UK Parliament: Argyll, Bute and South Lochaber
- Scottish Parliament: Argyll and Bute

Glendaruel (Gaelic: Gleann Dà Ruadhail) is a glen in Argyll and Bute, Scotland. The main settlement in Glendaruel is the Clachan of Glendaruel.

== Features ==
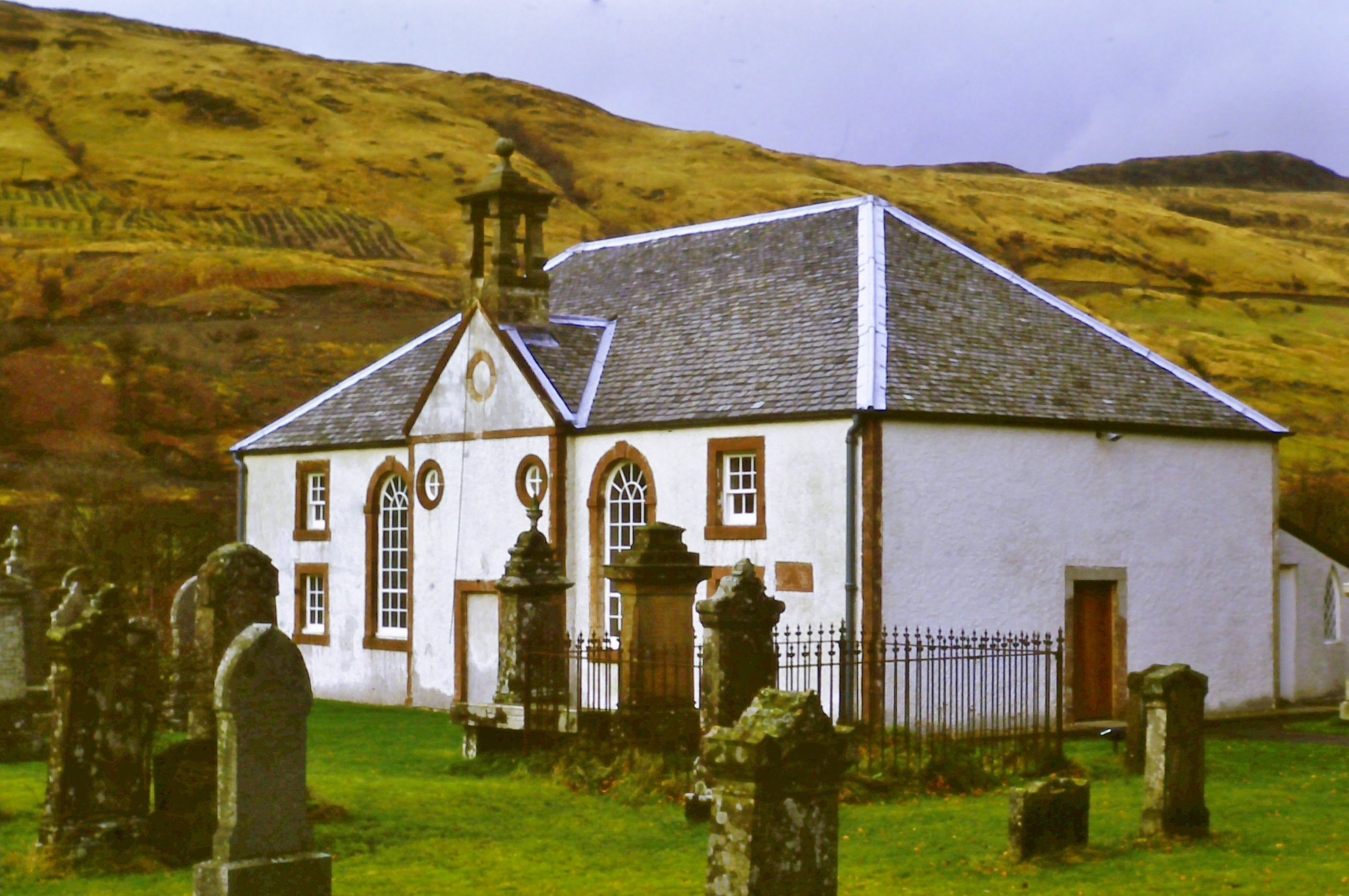
Kilmodan Church, Argyll

The present Kilmodan Church was built in the Clachan of Glendaruel in 1783. The Clachan of Glendaruel is the current location of Kilmodan Primary School, and the ground of Col-Glen Shinty Club.

The ruined Dunans Castle is also located in Glendaruel, while Glendaruel Wood and Crags and the Ruel Estuary are both included in the List of Sites of Special Scientific Interest in Mid Argyll and Cowal.

As the nearest Hospital is some miles away in Dunoon, a disused phone box in the village was converted to house a defibrillator. Just weeks before the installation, a tourist in Glendaruel had died from a heart attack.

== Decline ==
The community is home to around 188 people as of 2008 and has been subject to a general decline in the late 20th century continuing into the early 21st century. The closure of the Glendaruel Hotel, a 17th-century coaching inn housing the only local pub, was in particular described as "a body blow." The hotel closed not long after a widely publicized legal case was won by three Polish former employees who had been described as "Polish Slaves" by a former hotel proprietor, who subsequently went on to sell the hotel in 2007, failing to advise the new proprietor of the impending legal case, forcing the new owner into voluntary bankruptcy when his business was ruined by the adverse publicity. Over the past two decades a number of facilities within the community have been lost, notable examples include the post office, general store and tearoom with even Kilmodan Church becoming part-time, holding services only 2 Sundays in a month.

Glendaruel is marked out at government level as a typical example of a 'failing' rural village in an area of 'deprivation'.

=== School ===
Kilmodan Primary has been earmarked for closure at various times in recent decades including in 1998 and in 2010 when the school roll stood at just 22 students. As of June 2012 the school had "two teachers, 19 pupils and handful of support staff."

School year	2002/03	2003/04	2004/05	2005/06	2006/07	2007/08	2008/09	2009/10	2010/11	2011/12	2012/13	2013/2014	2014/2015
Total school roll	23	21	22	27	23	26	27	21	22	19	19	17	14

== Notable residents ==
- The Scottish mathematician Colin Maclaurin was born in Clachan of Glendaruel in 1698 to the Reverend John Maclaurin, who was minister to the parish of Kilmodan.
- Michael Russell MSP lives in an 18th-century cottage in Glendaruel with his wife. Russell represented the Argyll and Bute Scottish Parliament Constituency from 2011 to 2021, which includes Glendaruel.
- Peter Sinclair, born in Glendaruel, he later emigrated to Canada and entered politics there
- Kirsty McLuckie, journalist and broadcaster

== Cultural depictions ==
=== Mythology ===
Glendaruel is thought to be one of the glens praised in the Gaelic poem "The Lament of Deirdre", in which reference is made to a Glenndaruadh. It is found in the 15th-century Glenmasan manuscript, which may go back to an original written down in 1238. Deirdre is a tragic heroine in Irish mythology, and in the poem she is lamenting the necessity of leaving Scotland to return to Ireland.

=== Music ===
Glendaruel is the inspiration for a number of bagpipe tunes, including The Glendaruel Highlanders, The Sweet Maid of Glendaruel, and The Dream Valley of Glendaruel. The tune of The Glendaruel Highlanders was used for the popular Scottish comic song Campbeltown Loch, as sung by Andy Stewart.

== Gallery ==
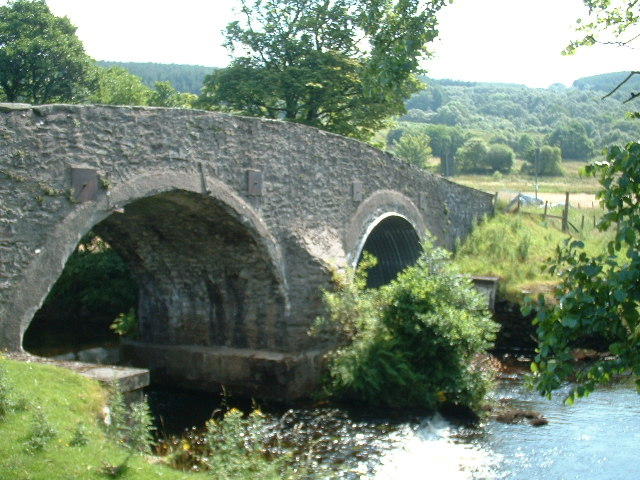
Glendaruel Bridge

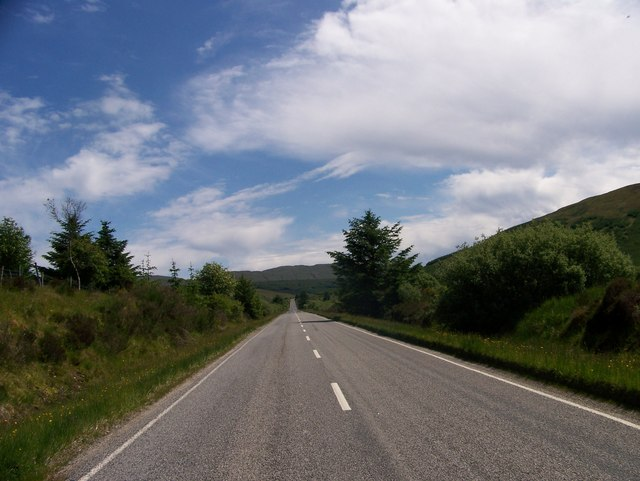
Road to Glendaruel from Loch Fyne

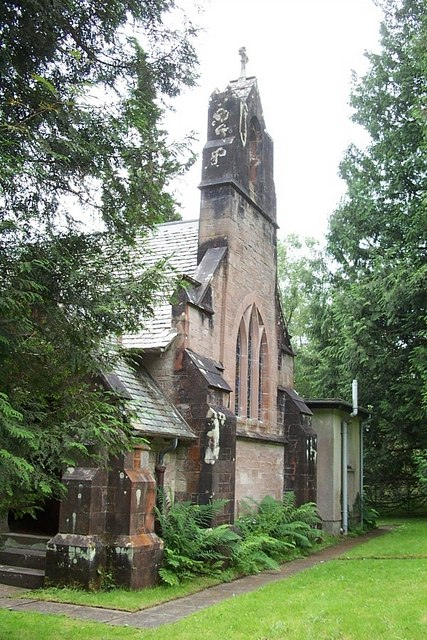
Chapel on the Glendaruel Estate
