= Basinghall Street =

Street in the City of London

Coordinates: 51.5157°N 0.091°W

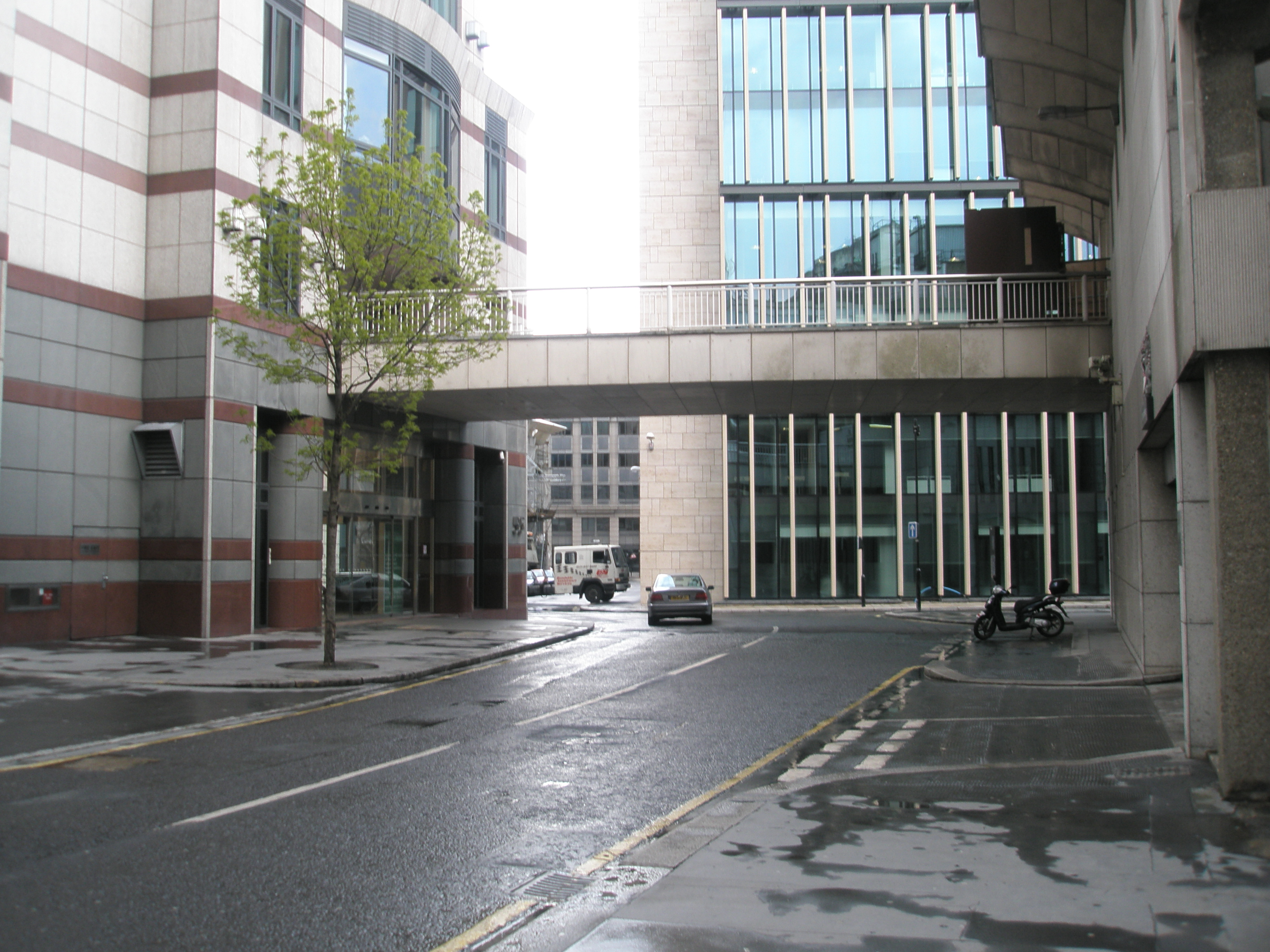
Footbridge over Basinghall Street

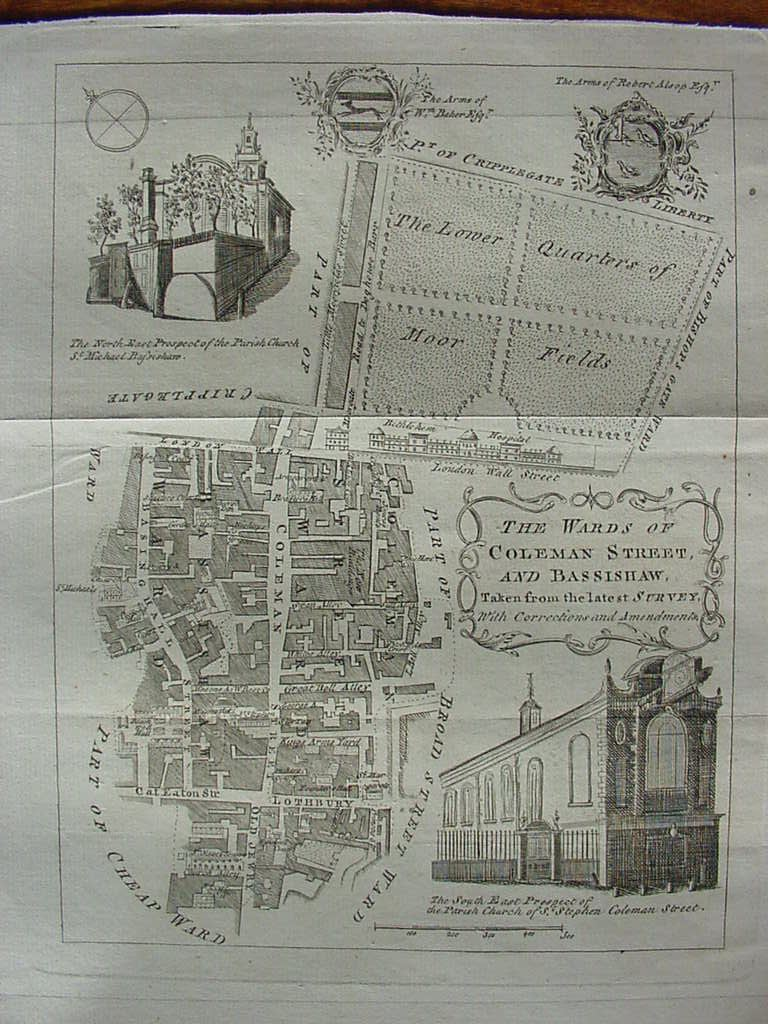
1754 map showing Basinghall Street and surrounding area

Basinghall Street (sometimes written as "Bassinghall") is a street in the City of London, England. It lies chiefly in the ward of Bassishaw (originally the street and the courts and passages leading off from it) with the southern end in Cheap and Coleman Street wards. The street and ward are named after the Bassing family, who built a hall house here in the 13th century and who were given certain privileges by the King.

The Guildhall, of a few separate "wings" has entrances around Guildhall Yard abutting, as well as another street, the west of the street; and the allied Mayor's and City of London Court forming "Guildhall Buildings" and its tree-lined walkways. The street was a direct link between Gresham Street, south then is cut off by building, most directly, from the road aspect of London Wall north. The latter is accessed from the street's north-western spur and Aldermanbury Square and footway by Brewers Hall, or longer north-eastern spur which is named Bassinghall Avenue which hosts the verdant Girdlers' Company mansion and then a few metres of Coleman Street.

Despite this westward change, the meandering street has kept the same length: of about 270 metres.

St Michael Bassishaw was a church on the street demolished in 1900.
