= Colin Maclaurin =

Scottish mathematician (1698–1746)

Colin Maclaurin FRS
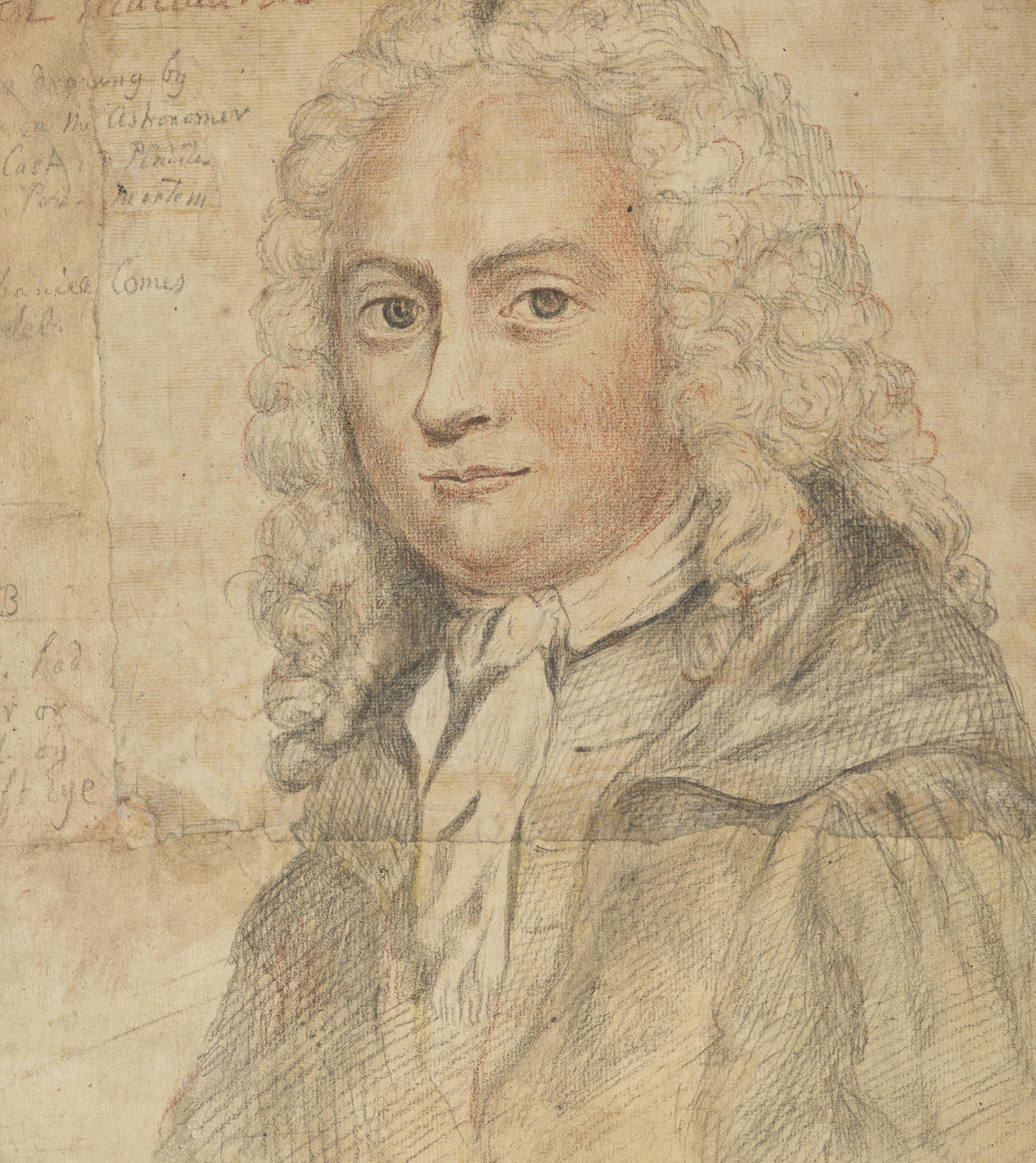
- Drawing by David Steuart Erskine c. 1795, from a portrait by James Ferguson
- Born: February 1698; Kilmodan, Cowal, Argyll, Scotland
- Died: 14 June 1746 (aged 48); Edinburgh, Scotland
- Citizenship: Great Britain
- Education: University of Glasgow
- Known for: Euler–Maclaurin formula Maclaurin's inequality Maclaurin series Maclaurin spheroid Maclaurin–Cauchy test Braikenridge–Maclaurin theorem Trisectrix of Maclaurin
- Spouse: Anne Stewart (m. 1733)
- Children: 7, including John Maclaurin, Lord Dreghorn
- Awards: Grand Prize of the French Academy of Sciences
- Scientific career
- Fields: Mathematician
- Workplaces: Marischal College, University of Aberdeen; University of Edinburgh
- Academic advisors: Robert Simson
- Notable students: Robert Adam

Colin Maclaurin (/məˈklɔːrən/; Scottish Gaelic: Cailean MacLabhruinn (Note: /ˈkalan maxkˈɫ̪aurɪɳ/); February 1698 – 14 June 1746) was a Scottish mathematician who made important contributions to geometry and algebra. He is also known for being a child prodigy and holding the record for being the youngest professor. The Maclaurin series, a special case of the Taylor series, is named after him.

Owing to changes in orthography since that time (his name was originally rendered as M'Laurine), his surname is alternatively written MacLaurin.

== Early life ==
Maclaurin was born in Kilmodan, Scotland and was the youngest of three sons. His father, John Maclaurin, a minister, died when Maclaurin was in infancy, and his mother died when he was nine years of age. He was then raised by his uncle, Daniel MacLaurin.

== Academic career ==
At eleven, Maclaurin, a child prodigy at the time, entered the University of Glasgow. He graduated Master of Arts three years later by defending a thesis on the Power of Gravity, and remained at Glasgow to study divinity until he was 19, when he was elected professor of mathematics in a ten-day competition at Marischal College and University in Aberdeen. This record as the world's youngest professor endured until February 2008, when Alia Sabur was appointed as a professor in South Korea for one year.

In the vacations of 1719 and 1721, Maclaurin went to London, where he became acquainted with Isaac Newton, Benjamin Hoadly, Samuel Clarke, Martin Folkes, and other philosophers. He was admitted as a member of the Royal Society.

In 1722, having provided a temporary replacement teacher for his class at Aberdeen, he travelled on the Continent as tutor to George Hume, the son of Alexander Hume, 2nd Earl of Marchmont. During their time in Lorraine, he wrote his essay on the percussion of bodies (Demonstration des loix du choc des corps), which gained the prize of the Royal Academy of Sciences in 1724. Upon the death of his pupil at Montpellier, Maclaurin returned to Aberdeen.

In 1725, Maclaurin was appointed deputy to the mathematical professor at the University of Edinburgh, James Gregory (brother of David Gregory and nephew of the esteemed James Gregory), upon the recommendation of Isaac Newton. On 3 November of that year Maclaurin succeeded Gregory, and went on to raise the character of that university as a school of science. Newton was so impressed with Maclaurin that he had offered to pay his salary himself.

== Contributions to mathematics ==
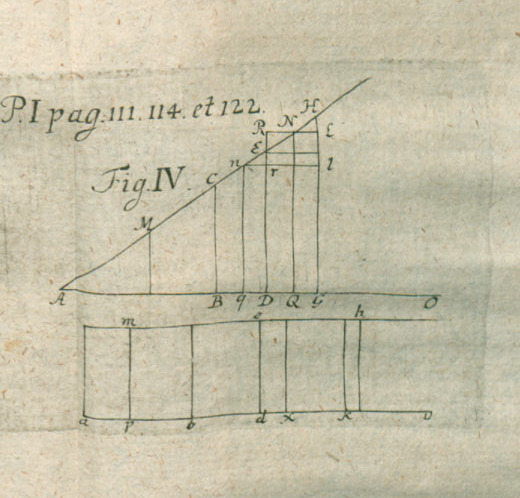
Illustration of critique of De fluxionibus libri duo published in Acta Eruditorum, 1747

Maclaurin used Taylor series to characterize maxima, minima, and points of inflection for infinitely differentiable functions in his Treatise of Fluxions. Maclaurin attributed the series to Brook Taylor, though the series was known before to Newton and Gregory. Nevertheless, Maclaurin received credit for his use of the series, and the Taylor series expanded around 0 is sometimes known as the Maclaurin series.

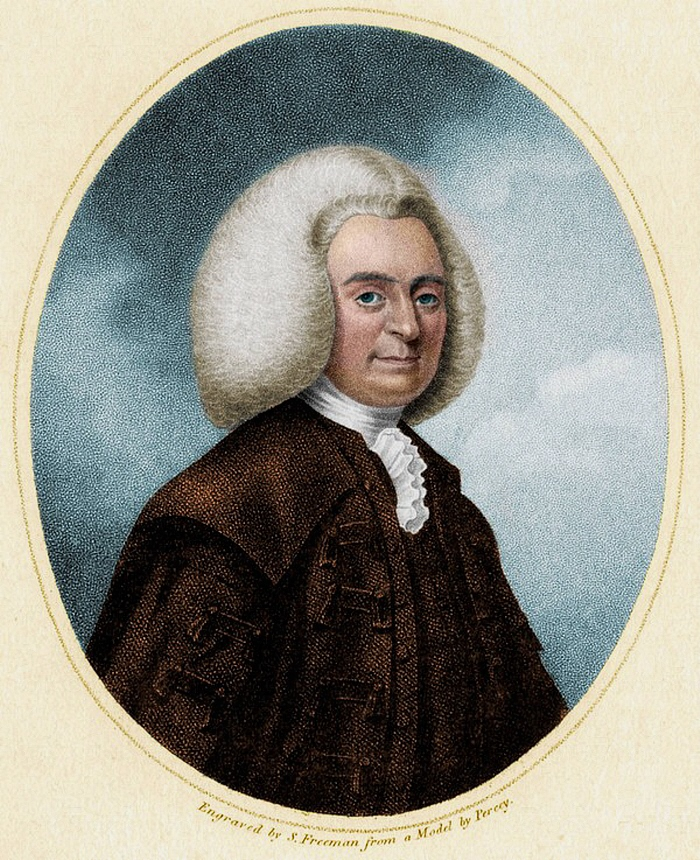
Colin Maclaurin (1698–1746)

Maclaurin also made significant contributions to the gravitation attraction of ellipsoids, a subject that furthermore attracted the attention of d'Alembert, A.-C. Clairaut, Euler, Laplace, Legendre, Poisson and Gauss. Maclaurin showed that an oblate spheroid was a possible equilibrium in Newton's theory of gravity. The subject continues to be of scientific interest, and Nobel Laureate Subramanyan Chandrasekhar dedicated a chapter of his book Ellipsoidal Figures of Equilibrium to Maclaurin spheroids. Maclaurin corresponded extensively with Clairaut, Maupertuis, and d'Ortous de Mairan.

Independently from Euler and using the same methods, Maclaurin discovered the Euler–Maclaurin formula. He used it to sum powers of arithmetic progressions, derive Stirling's formula, and to derive the Newton–Cotes numerical integration formulas which includes Simpson's rule as a special case.

Maclaurin contributed to the study of elliptic integrals, reducing many intractable integrals to problems of finding arcs for hyperbolas. His work was continued by d'Alembert and Euler, who gave a more concise approach.

In his Treatise of Algebra (Ch. XII, Sect 86), published in 1748 two years after his death, Maclaurin proved a rule for solving square linear systems in the cases of 2 and 3 unknowns, and discussed the case of 4 unknowns. This publication preceded by two years Cramer's publication of a generalization of the rule to n unknowns, now commonly known as Cramer's rule.

== Personal life ==
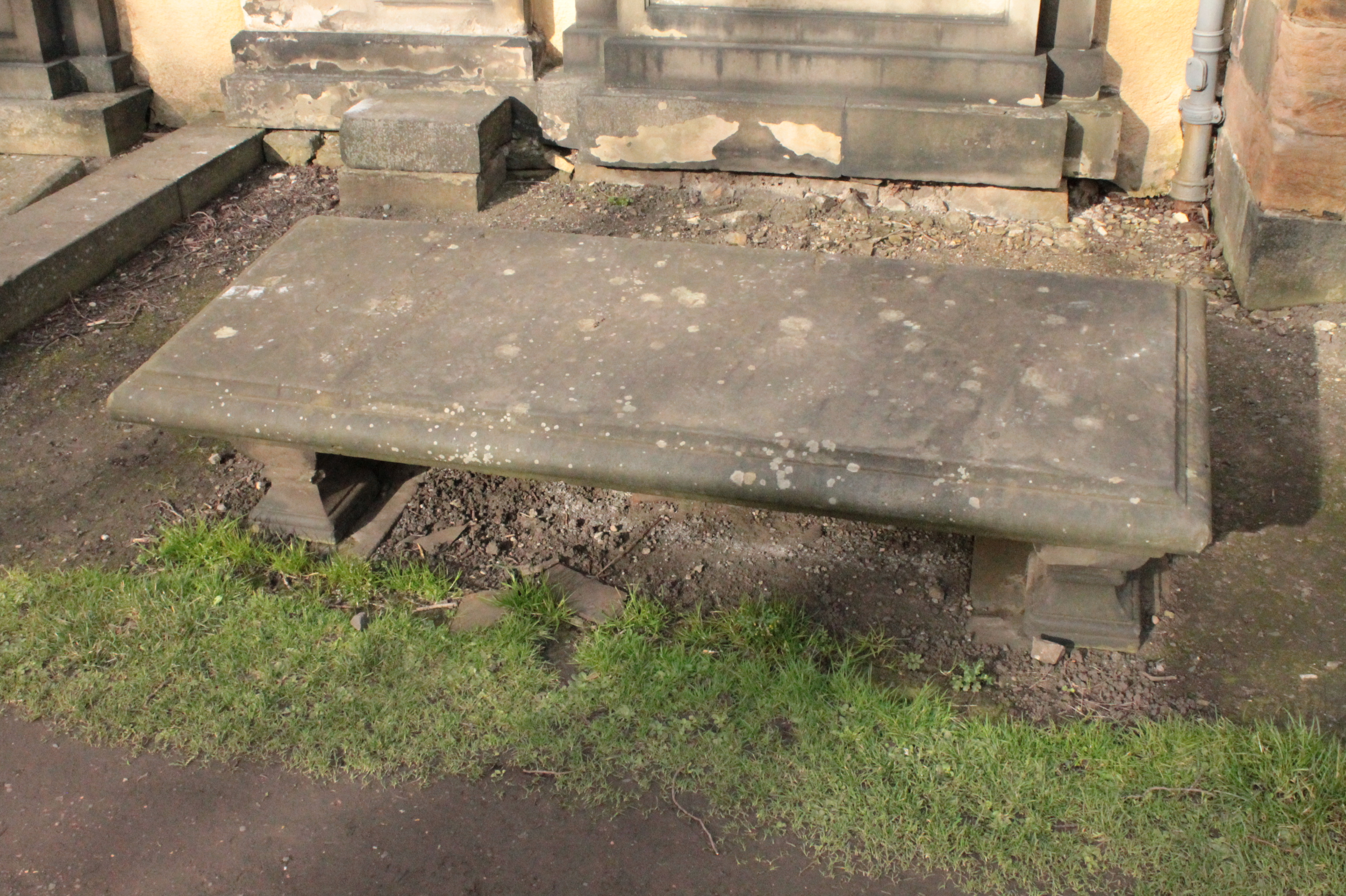
The grave of Colin Maclaurin, Greyfriars Kirkyard

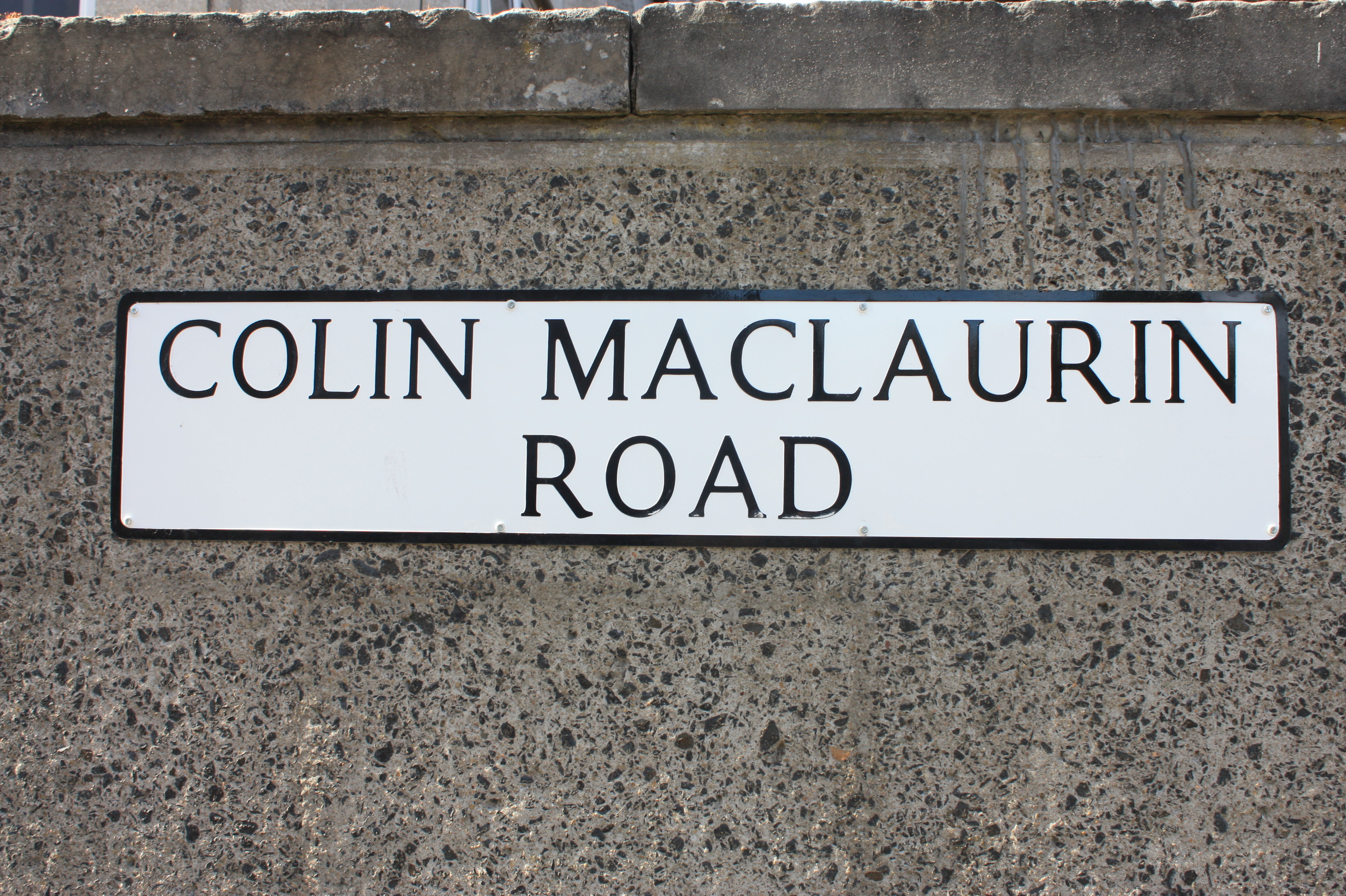
Colin Maclaurin Road, Edinburgh

In 1733, Maclaurin married Anne Stewart, the daughter of Walter Stewart, the Solicitor General for Scotland, by whom he had seven children. His eldest son John Maclaurin studied law, was a Senator of the College of Justice, and became Lord Dreghorn; he was also joint founder of the Royal Society of Edinburgh.

Maclaurin actively opposed the Jacobite rising of 1745 and superintended the operations necessary for the defence of Edinburgh against the Highland army. Maclaurin compiled a diary of his exertions against the Jacobites, both within and without the city. When the Highland army entered the city, however, he fled to York, where he was invited to stay by the Archbishop of York.

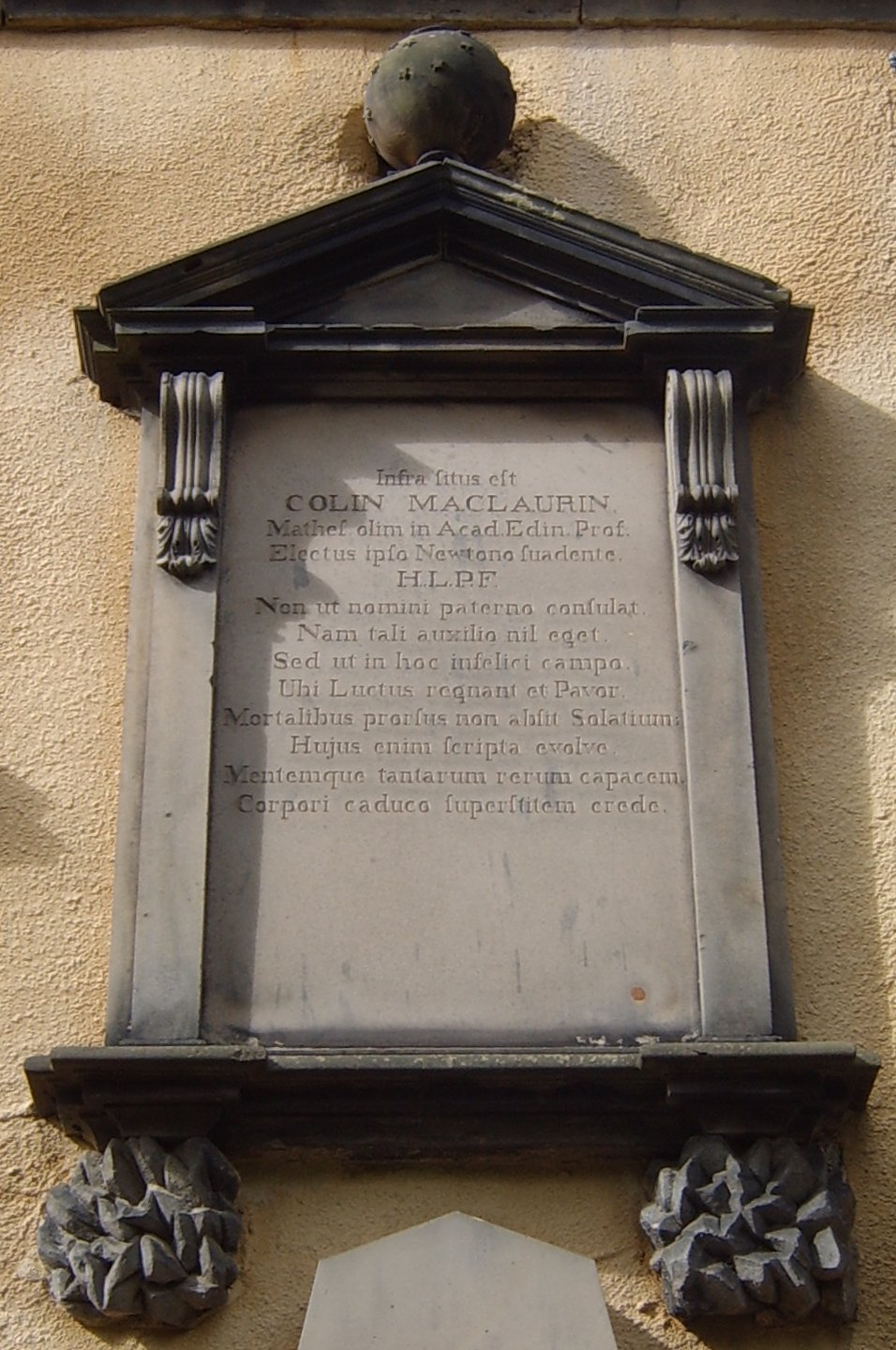
Memorial, Greyfriars Kirkyard, Edinburgh

On his journey south, Maclaurin fell from his horse, and the fatigue, anxiety, and cold to which he was exposed on that occasion laid the foundations of dropsy. He returned to Edinburgh after the Jacobite army marched south, but died soon after his return.

He is buried at Greyfriars Kirkyard, Edinburgh. The simple table stone is inscribed simply "C. M. Nat MDCXCVIII Ob MDCCXLVI" and stands close to the south-west corner of the church but is supplemented by a more wordy memorial on the outer wall of the church.

The mathematician and former MIT President Richard Cockburn Maclaurin was from the same family.

The Maclaurin Society (MacSoc), the Mathematics and Statistics Society at Glasgow University, is named in his honour.

Colin Maclaurin Road within Edinburgh University's King's Buildings complex is named in his honour.

== Notable works ==
Some of his important works are:

- Geometria Organica – 1720
- De Linearum Geometricarum Proprietatibus – 1720
- Treatise on Fluxions – 1742 (763 pages in two volumes. The first systematic exposition of Newton's methods.)
- Treatise of Algebra – 1748 (two years after his death.)
- Account of Newton's Discoveries – Incomplete upon his death and published in 1748
- Account of Sir Isaac Newton's philosophical discoveries (in French). Paris: Laurent Durand. 1749.

Colin Maclaurin was the name used for the new Mathematics and Actuarial Mathematics and Statistics Building at Heriot-Watt University, Edinburgh.

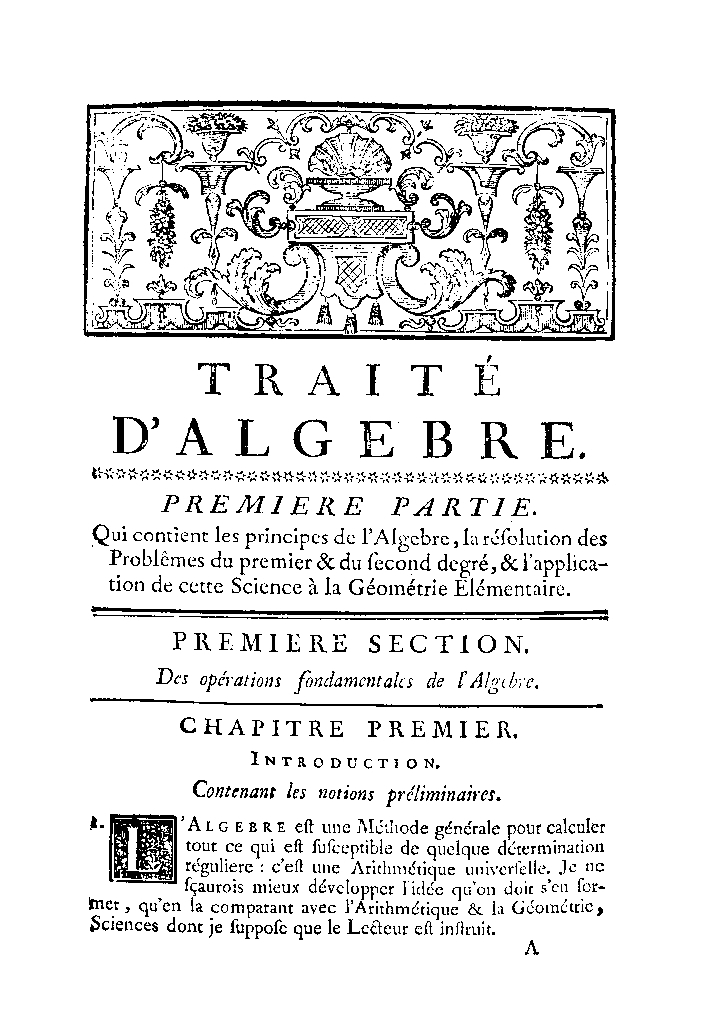
French edition of the Treatise of algebra (1748)

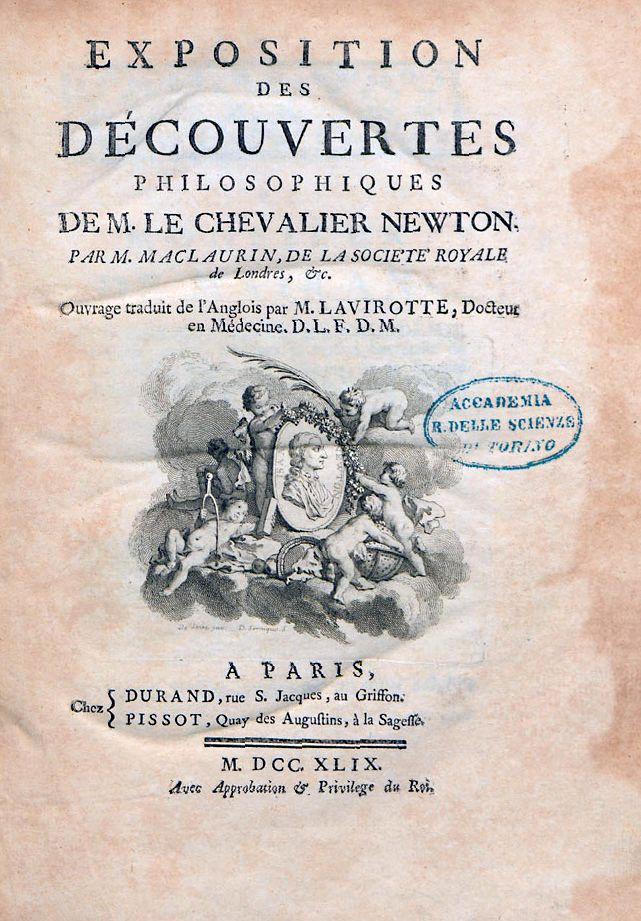
French edition of the Account of Sir Isaac Newton's philosophical discoveries (1749)

== See also ==
- Braikenridge–Maclaurin theorem
- Trisectrix of Maclaurin
- Cayley's sextic
- Cramer's paradox
- Hesse configuration
- Sinusoidal spiral

== Sources ==
- Anderson, William, The Scottish Nation, Edinburgh, 1867, vol.VII, p. 37.
- Ball, W. W. Rouse (1908). A Short Account of the History of Mathematics (4th ed.). pp. 384–387.
- "Overview of Colin Maclaurin". Gazetteer for Scotland. University of Edinburgh School of GeoSciences.
- Friedman, Erich. "Colin Maclaurin". Periodic Table of Mathematicians. Stetson University. Archived from the original on 14 February 2008.
- O'Connor, John J.; Robertson, Edmund F., "Colin Maclaurin", MacTutor History of Mathematics Archive, University of St Andrews
- Sageng, Erik, 2005, "A treatise on fluxions" in Grattan-Guinness, I., ed., Landmark Writings in Western Mathematics. Elsevier: 143–58.
- Tweddle, Ian (November 1998). "The prickly genius—Colin Maclaurin (1698–1746)" (PDF). The Mathematical Gazette. 82 (495). Leicester: Mathematical Association: 373–378. doi:10.2307/3619883. JSTOR 3619883. Archived from the original (PDF) on 31 October 2007.
