= Maiden Island =

Location
- Maiden Island shown within Argyll and Bute
- OS grid reference: NM847319
- Coordinates: 56.4305°N 5.492532°W

Physical geography
- Island group: Firth of Lorn
- Area: 3 ha (7 acres)
- Highest elevation: 28 m (92 ft)

Administration
- Council area: Argyll and Bute
- Country: Scotland
- Sovereign state: United Kingdom

Demographics
- Population: 0

Maiden Island is a small uninhabited island at the mouth of Oban Bay on the west coast of Scotland.

== Geography ==
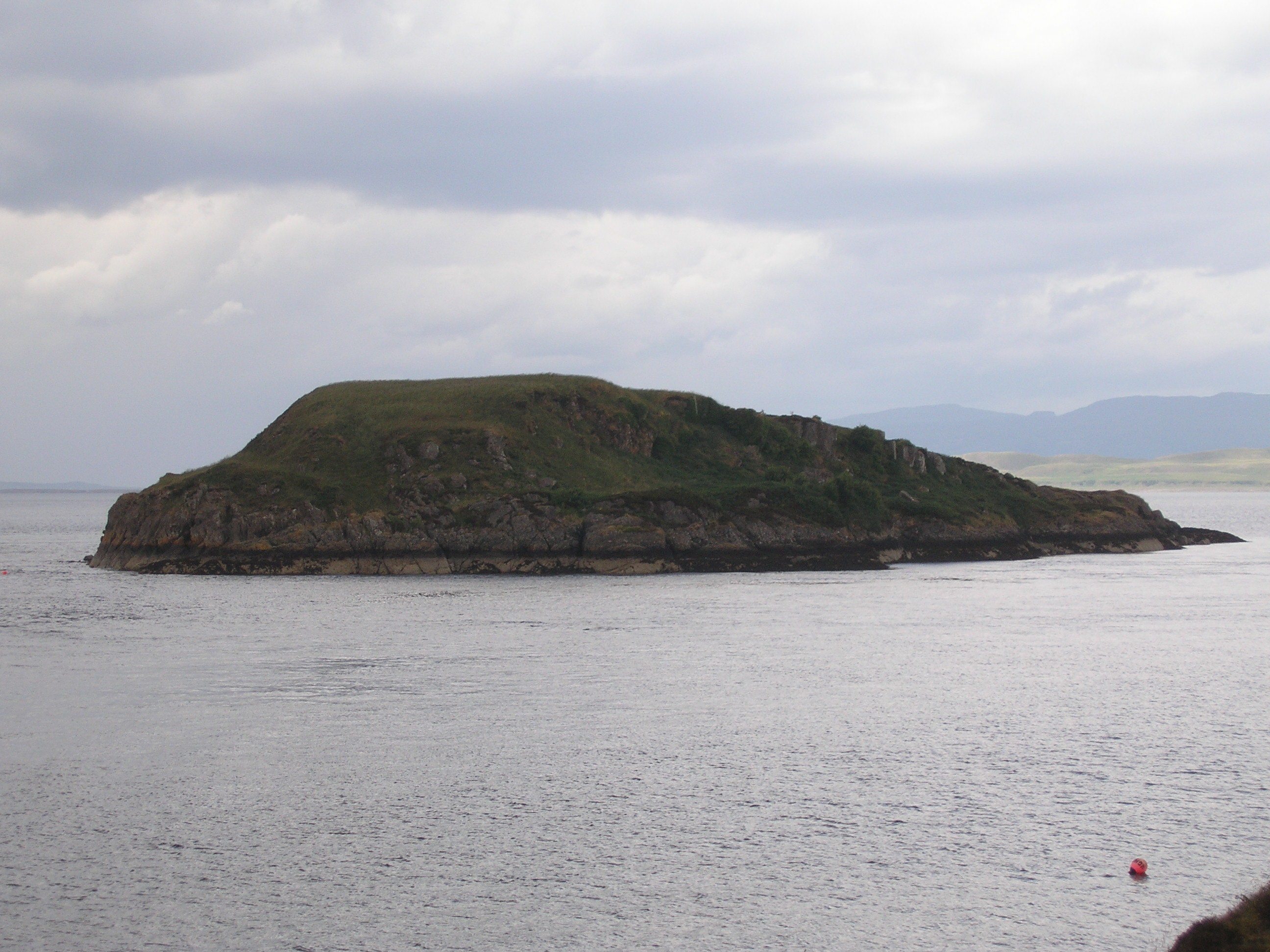
Maiden Island from Dunollie

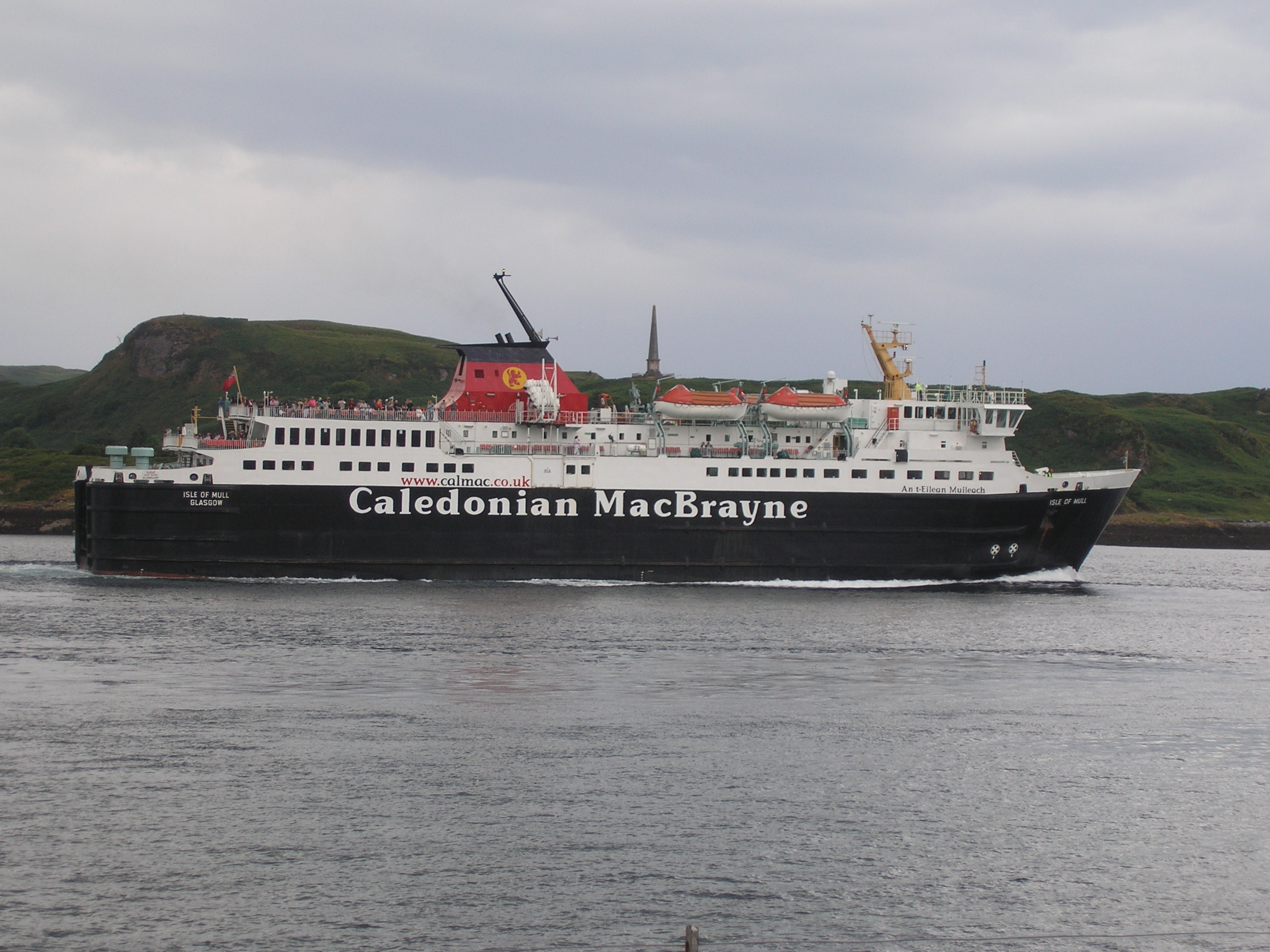
MV Isle of Mull in the strait between Maiden Island and Kerrera with the Hutchison Memorial in the background

Maiden Island lies just off the coast of mainland Scotland, west of Dunollie Castle and Camas Bàn. It is to the north of the narrow entrance to Oban Bay and about 0.5 kilometres (1/4 mi) north of the much larger island of Kerrera. The passage is deep and large vessels such as the Caledonian MacBrayne ferry MV Isle of Mull make regular use of this strait. The island reaches a height of 28 metres (92 ft) above sea level.

The prominent Hutchison Memorial on the north end of Kerrera that commemorates David Hutchison, one of the founders of Caledonian MacBrayne, is visible from Maiden Island.

== History ==
There are a variety of legends associated with the naming of the isle. It may have a connection with King Malcolm IV of Scotland (1153–1165) known as "Malcolm the Maiden" by later chroniclers, who had connections with Kerrera. Another story involves a young girl accused of a crime who was tied up on the shore there in order to persuade her make an admission. However, she refused and when the tide came in she drowned. A more romantic tale concerns Muireadhach (Murdoch), a Celtic warrior who was in love with Mhairi, the daughter of a local man. Doubts were cast about the latter's chastity and it was decided she should be tied by her hair to a rock on the shore to test her purity. The problem for Mhairi was that if her hair held strong her innocence would be proven but she would drown. Muireadhach made an heroic effort to save her by attempting to swim to the island but strong currents swept him away and they both drowned.

More prosaically, there are a number of Scottish islands that bear this name, and it is likely that it was used as a refuge for women during times of war.

== Wrecks ==
On 23 December 1940, during World War II a convoy of ships gathered off the island of Lismore were attacked when two Heinkel He 111 bombers. The Breda, a cargo vessel, was damaged and had to be beached in nearby Ardnamucknish Bay. Debris from the wreck was carried by the tide towards Oban Bay and four days later a Sunderland Flying Boat of 210 Squadron hit a horsebox floating in the water whilst attempting a routine landing in the dark. The aircraft broke up and sank just off Maiden Island with only one survivor from the 11 crew members on board.

== See also ==
- List of islands of Scotland
