= MV Coruisk =

Scottish ferry built in 2003

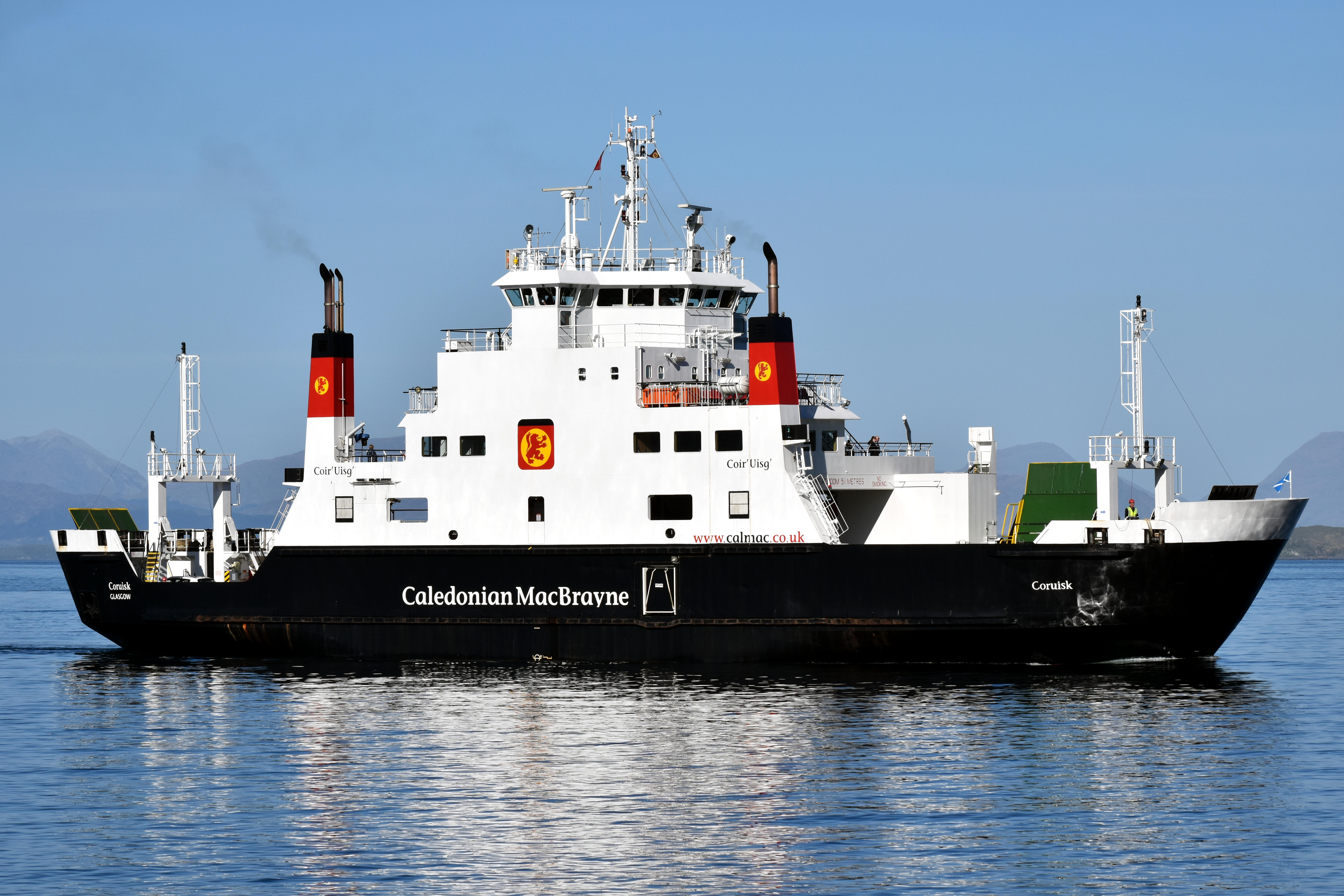
- Arriving at Craignure from Oban, 8 May 2017.

History

United Kingdom
- Name: MV Coruisk; Scottish Gaelic: Coir' Uisg'
- Namesake: Loch Coruisk in the heart of the Cuillin of Skye
- Owner: Caledonian Maritime Assets
- Operator: Caledonian MacBrayne
- Port of registry: Glasgow
- Route: Mallaig–Armadale (summer); Wemyss Bay–Rothesay (winter relief)
- Builder: Appledore Shipbuilders Ltd, Bideford, Devon
- Cost: £6.75 million
- Yard number: 190
- Launched: 3 May 2003
- Completed: 2003
- In service: 14 August 2003
- Identification: IMO number: 9274836; Callsign: VQKF2; MMSI Number: 235008929
- Status: in service

General characteristics
- Class & type: ro-ro vehicle ferry
- Tonnage: 1,559 gt; 250 DWT
- Length: 65 m (213 ft 3 in)
- Beam: 14 m (45 ft 11 in)
- Draft: 3.05 m (10 ft 0 in)
- Installed power: Machinery: 6M20 each rated at 1000kW @ 1000 rpm
- Propulsion: Two Schottel Rudder Propellers type STP 1010
- Speed: 14 kn (26 km/h)
- Capacity: 249 passengers and 35 cars
- Crew: 12

MV Coruisk (Scottish Gaelic: Coir' Uisg') is a Caledonian Maritime Assets Limited ferry built in 2003, operated by Scottish ferry operator Caledonian MacBrayne and serving the west coast of Scotland.

== History ==
Following her launch at Appledore's yard in early 2003, Coruisk left on her delivery voyage on 2 August. She carried out berthing trials on the Clyde before taking over the Mallaig to Armadale route on 14 August. She was officially named at Armadale by Baroness Ray Michie of Gallanach at a special ceremony.

Initial technical problems required MV Pioneer to resume the service for some time. On 24 August, Coruisk lost power and struck a reef at the Mallaig harbour entrance, losing one of her propulsion units. She went to the Clyde for repairs and did not return to Mallaig that season. The following winter season at Dunoon was only slightly more successful, with slow berthing and many passenger complaints adding to her worsening reputation. Subsequent seasons have been less eventful.

In March 2014, she ran into the pier at Dunoon, sustaining serious damage but managed to make her own way to Greenock to be assessed for repairs.

== Layout ==
The design of Coruisk is unique. As well as bow and stern ramps, allowing drive-through operation, she also has a port side ramp, allowing side-loading on the Clyde in winter months. The bow ramp is protected by an open visor, similar to those found on Orkney and Shetland inter-island ferries. Clearance on the car deck is 5.1 metres (16 feet 9 inches).

Above the car deck are two passenger decks, one containing the main lounge areas with toilets and a small shop/kiosk. A small external deck area on the same level, both fore and aft of the lounges, has stairways leading to the open deck above. Crew accommodation is on the upper deck. Sitting even further up, the bridge gives the master a view down over bow and stern. A temporary modification is made for the winter seasons to accommodate the gangways at Wemyss Bay and Rothesay.

Schottel electric azimuth thrusters incorporate rotating pods protruding beneath the hull, with two propellers on each. Although similar to Voith Schneider units, the vessel proved much harder to control and manoeuvre.

== Service ==
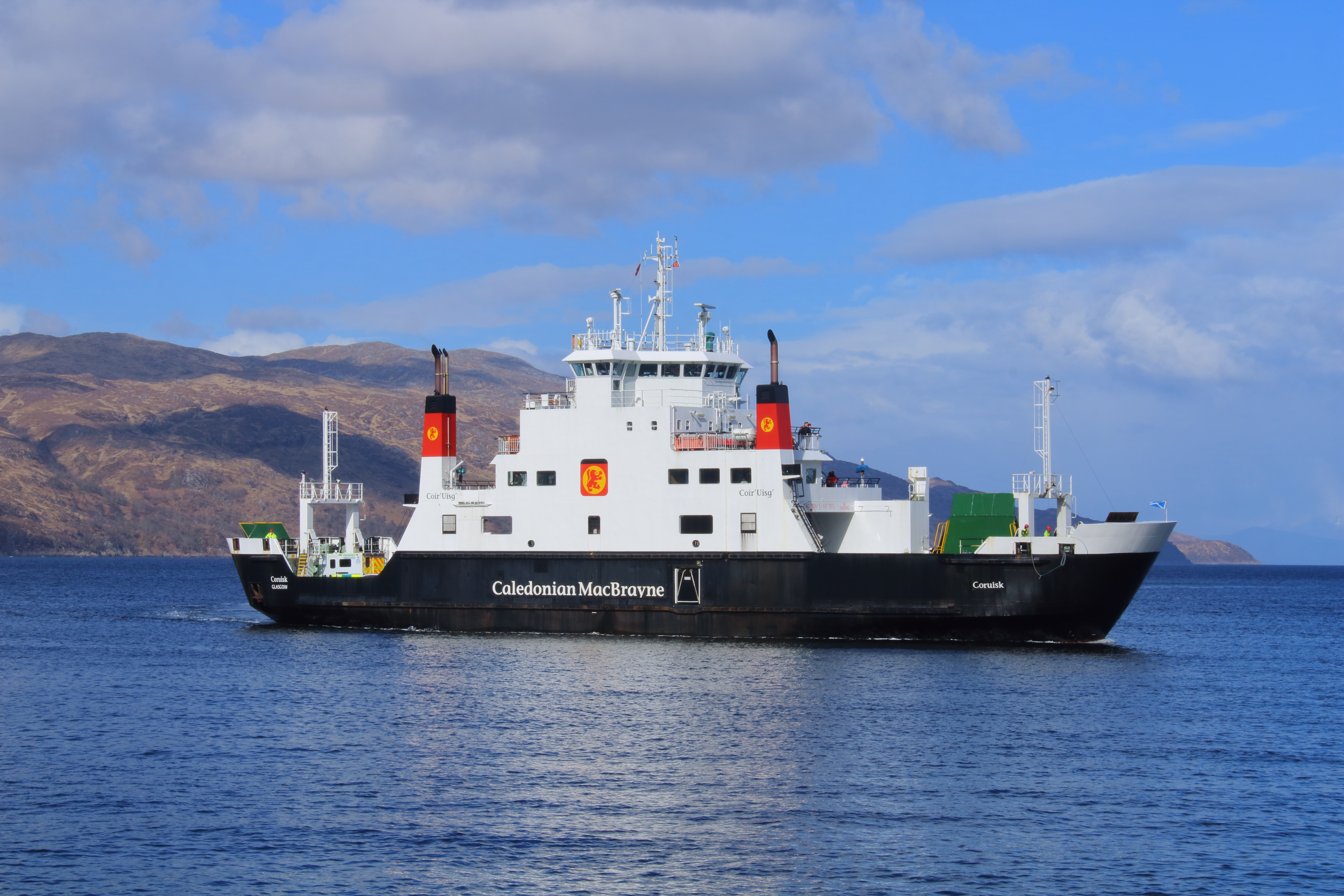
MV Coruisk at Craignure

Coruisk was the sole vessel on the Mallaig to Armadale service in summers until 2016. In winter, she relieves on the Upper Clyde, while MV Lochnevis adds Armadale to her Small Isles roster. Since 2011, when the Gourock to Dunoon service (operated by Argyll Ferries until 2019) became passenger-only, Coruisk relieves at Rothesay and provides support on the Dunoon crossing.

From March 2016 until July 2022, Coruisk was the second ferry on the Oban–Craignure route on the summer timetable, alongside MV Isle of Mull. She was replaced at Mallaig for the 2016 season by the smaller MV Lochinvar, MV Loch Bhrusda and MV Lord of the Isles (in between the latter's Lochboisdale–Mallaig sailings). This shuffling of the Mallaig fleet was criticised, with campaigners calling for Coruisk to remain at Mallaig with MV Lord of the Isles. CalMac announced that Coruisk would remain on the Oban–Craignure route for a second summer season: the Skye crossing being operated by MV Lord of the Isles and MV Loch Fyne. That arrangement was expected to continue until MV Glen Sannox and MV Glen Rosa entered service, but in summer 2022, when MV Loch Frisa entered service at Craignure, Coruisk returned to Mallaig. Coruisk is due to return to the Oban-Craignure route for the beginning of the 2025 summer season, operating alongside Loch Frisa until Isle of Mull returns from work to replace her marine evacuation system.
