= MV Lord of the Isles =

Scottish ferry launched 1989

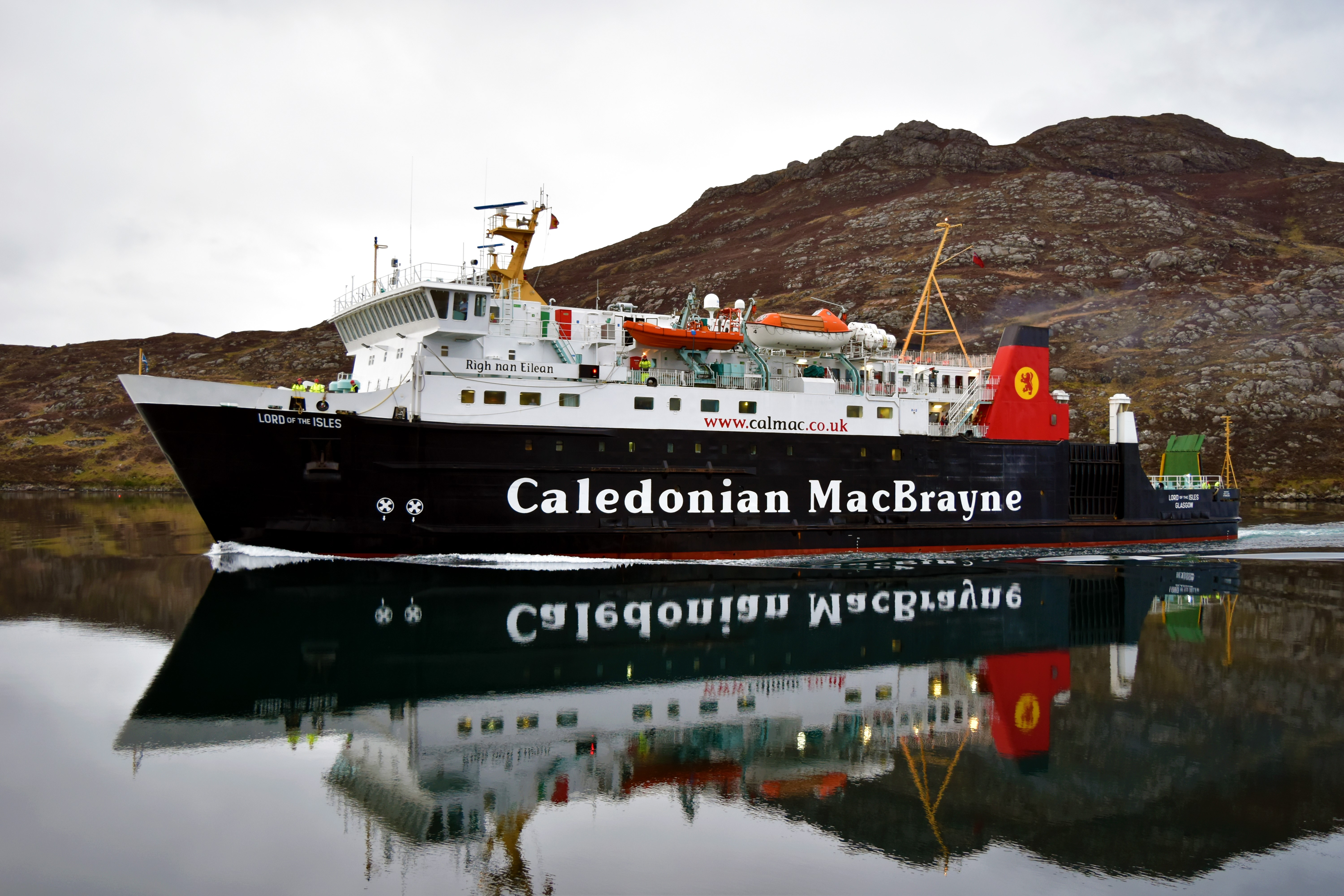
- Approaching Lochboisdale from Mallaig, 10 May 2017.

History

United Kingdom
- Name: MV Lord of the Isles; Scottish Gaelic: Rìgh nan Eilean
- Owner: Caledonian Maritime Assets Limited
- Operator: Caledonian MacBrayne
- Port of registry: Glasgow
- Route: Mallaig - Lochboisdale; Oban - Lochboisdale (winter); Oban - Colonsay (winter)
- Builder: Ferguson Shipbuilders, Port Glasgow
- Launched: 7 March 1989, the Clyde
- Christened: by Mrs Edith Rifkind, wife of Malcolm Rifkind Secretary of State for Transport
- Maiden voyage: 22 May 1989
- Identification: IMO number: 8710869; Callsign: MKHA7; MMSI number: 232605000
- Status: in service

General characteristics
- Tonnage: 3,504 gt
- Length: 84.6 m
- Beam: 15.8 m
- Draft: 3.18 m
- Propulsion: Diesel; 2 x Electric Bow Thrusters
- Speed: 16 knots (30 km/h; 18 mph) (service)
- Capacity: 505 passengers, 56 cars
- Crew: 28

MV Lord of the Isles is one of the larger Caledonian MacBrayne vessels, and operates from Mallaig on the west of Scotland. Built in Port Glasgow, she is the most-travelled vessel in the CalMac fleet.

== History ==
Lord of the Isles, affectionately known as LOTI, was launched on 7 March 1989 at Ferguson Shipbuilders, Port Glasgow. Although based in Mallaig, she is able to berth and load traffic all over the Clyde and Hebridean Isles network.

== Layout ==
At 85 metres (279 feet) long, Lord of the Isles is one of the largest ships in the fleet, with an appearance broadly similar to MV Isle of Mull at the forward end and an aft end that resembles MV Hebridean Isles. The car deck, open at the stern, is capable of holding up to 56 cars. She is now the only vessel in the fleet with a vehicle hoist to allow loading at the older piers, but this hasn't been used for many years.

The passenger accommodation provides space for a maximum certificate complement of 506. It consists of lounges, a cafeteria, a bar and a shop on one deck, with an aft observation lounge on the deck above. She is the last vessel in the fleet to have sleeping accommodation for the longer passages.

== Service ==
Entering service in 1989 on the Coll / Tiree and Barra / South Uist routes from Oban, MV Lord of the Isles combined two previous timetables. This freed up both Columba (1964) and Claymore (1978) and allowed a cascade to take place within the fleet. She remained at Oban for nine years, occasionally switching places with Isle of Mull on the Craignure crossing and relieving at Uig and Ardrossan.

In 1998, Lord of the Isles was replaced by Clansman and transferred to Mallaig, replacing the veteran Iona on the seasonal Skye service. During the winter months she returned to Oban in a relief role. From 2003 to 2016, Lord of the Isles returned to Oban, alongside Isle of Mull and Clansman, providing additional sailings on a range of routes. With seven islands appearing regularly in her routine, she is easily the most-travelled vessel in today's fleet. She has also served at Wemyss Bay over the May Day holiday weekend in 2004 and on the Ardrossan - Brodick route in 2012, while Caledonian Isles went for overhaul.

From 2013, Lord of the Isles ran a trial winter service between Mallaig and Lochboisdale. Over half of the scheduled trial sailings were cancelled due to adverse weather and tidal conditions. Despite the apparent lack of success, it was announced in September 2015 that Lord of the Isles would commence daily return sailings on the route from the summer timetable in 2016. Once again based in Mallaig rather than Oban, she also carried out extra sailings on the Armadale route alongside the 2016 season vessels, Lochinvar and Loch Bhrusda, which had replaced Coruisk. This vessel reshuffling was criticised for the reduced capacity and inadequate passenger accommodation of Lochinvar, with calls for Coruisk to return to Mallaig alongside Lord of the Isles.

Since the winter of 2016/17, Lord of the Isles started serving Oban from Lochboisdale on Mondays and Fridays, alongside her thrice-weekly sailings to Mallaig. On Mondays, from Oban she makes an afternoon return crossing to Colonsay, before returning to Lochboisdale in the evening.

From summer of 2017, Lord of the Isles was partnered with Loch Fyne on the Mallaig–Armadale ferry crossing; the previous smaller vessels were cascaded elsewhere in the CalMac network. This arrangement was expected to continue until the new Glen Sannox entered service on the Ardrossan-Brodick crossing in late 2021, partnering Caledonian Isles, however in summer 2022, following the acquisition of MV Loch Frisa for the Oban - Craignure service, Coruisk returned to the Mallaig - Armadale service alongside Loch Fyne. This allowed Lord of the Isles to operate a second return service between Lochboisdale and Mallaig on certain days.

In April and May 2021, Lord of the Isles combined the Lochboisdale and Castlebay services, while Isle of Lewis returned to the Stornoway - Ullapool service, with Loch Seaforth undergoing repairs to the port engine.

On 29 January 2023, Lord of the Isles caught fire at Oban Ferry Terminal, with an engine fire spreading to the car deck.

In April 2024, Lord of the Isles relieved Finlaggan on the Kennacraig - Islay service alongside Hebridean Isles. Her roster at South Uist was covered by Isle of Mull. She returned in Autumn 2024, operating alongside Finlaggan whilst Hebridean Isles relieved on the Ardrossan - Brodick service in place of Isle of Arran, who in turn was relieving for Caledonian Isles but was required to enter annual overhaul.

On 6 August 2024, Lord of the Isles suffered a fire onboard which caused a major failure of the starboard engine whilst she was on passage between Mallaig and Lochboisdale. This required her to divert to Armadale using the port engine. She was subsequently towed to drydock in Greenock for repair. Following repair she returned to service on 24 August.

On 19 October 2024, Lord of the Isles was deployed to the Ardrossan - Brodick service, covering for Isle of Arran's annual overhaul, who had in turn been covering Caledonian Isles due to the latter's ongoing repairs.

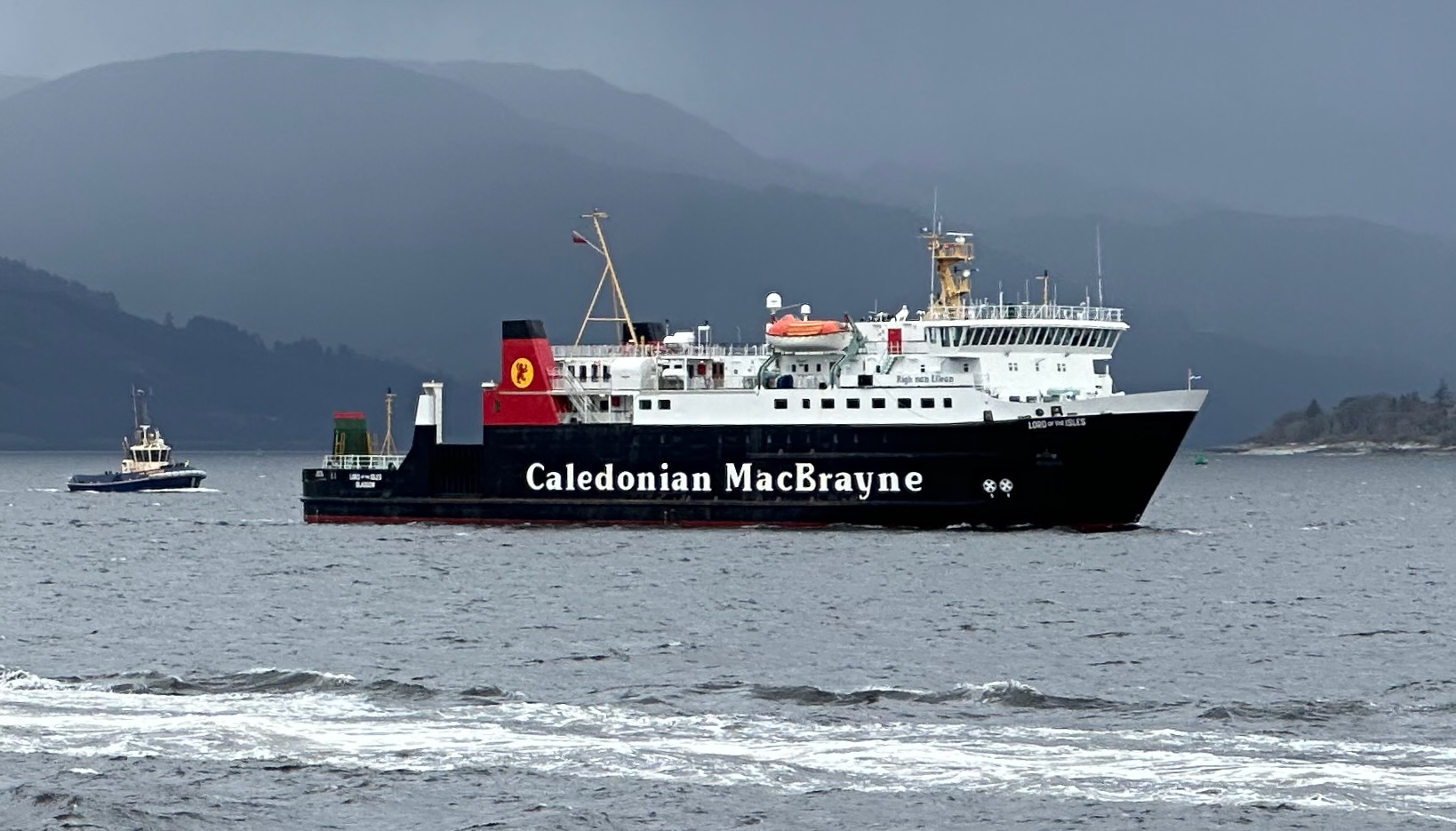
9 April 2026, being escorted by tug from Oban to Greenock for further engine repairs

CalMac services were disrupted by a long-running shortage of ships. In late March 2026, four vessels were off for annual maintenance, and three were out of action with technical problems. Lord of the Isles was covering the Oban to Mull route when problems with its main engine prevented sailings on 28 March. After repairs in Greenock and a return to Oban, the ferry had to be escorted by a tug back to the repairers for further work.

== See also ==
- Caledonian MacBrayne fleet
