= Isle of Mull Railway =

Former railway line in Scotland

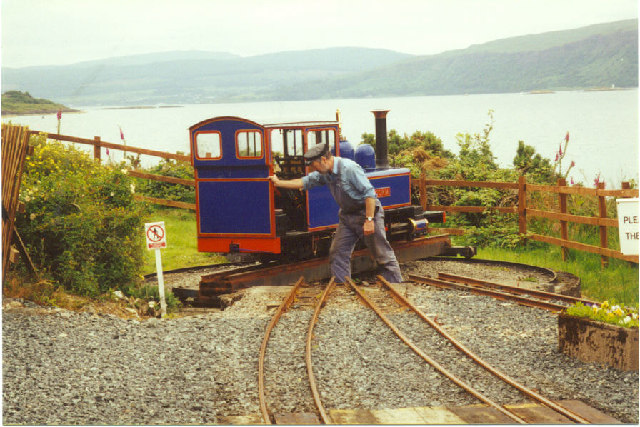
Craignure station on the 10 1/4 in (260 mm) gauge Isle of Mull railway

The Isle of Mull Railway was a 10 1/4 in (260 mm) gauge line, 1 1/4 miles (2.0 km) long, which ran from the ferry terminal at Craignure to Torosay Castle, on the Isle of Mull in the Scottish Inner Hebrides. Originally it was known as the Mull and West Highland Railway (Mull and West Highland (Narrow Gauge) Railway Company Ltd). The line was marketed as Scotland's original island passenger railway. The line opened in 1983 and closed in October 2010. A limited service operated over the 2011 Easter holiday and during summer 2011. The company's lease expired in October 2011. The track was lifted in October 2012.

== History ==
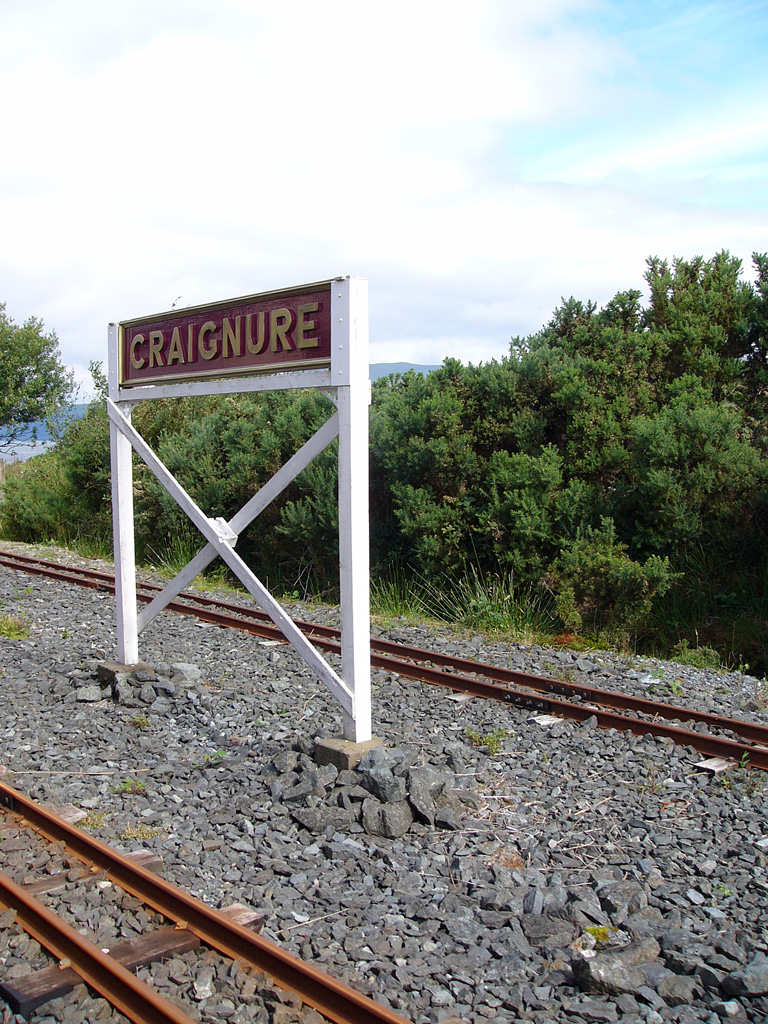
Craignure Station in 2010

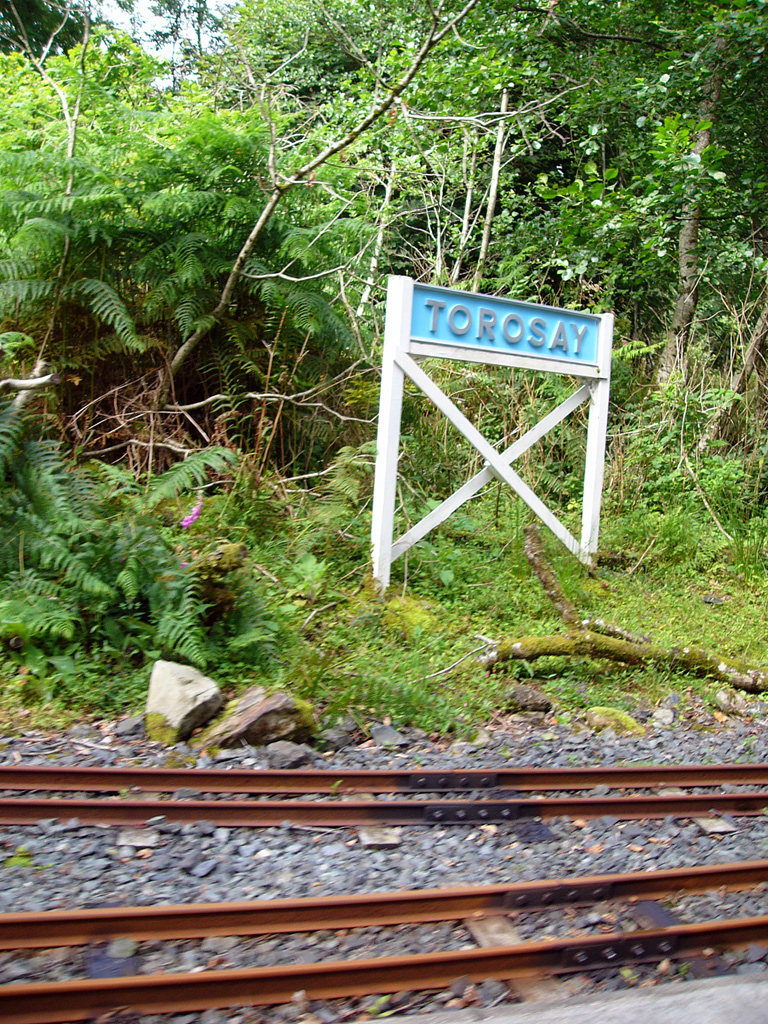
Torosay in 2010

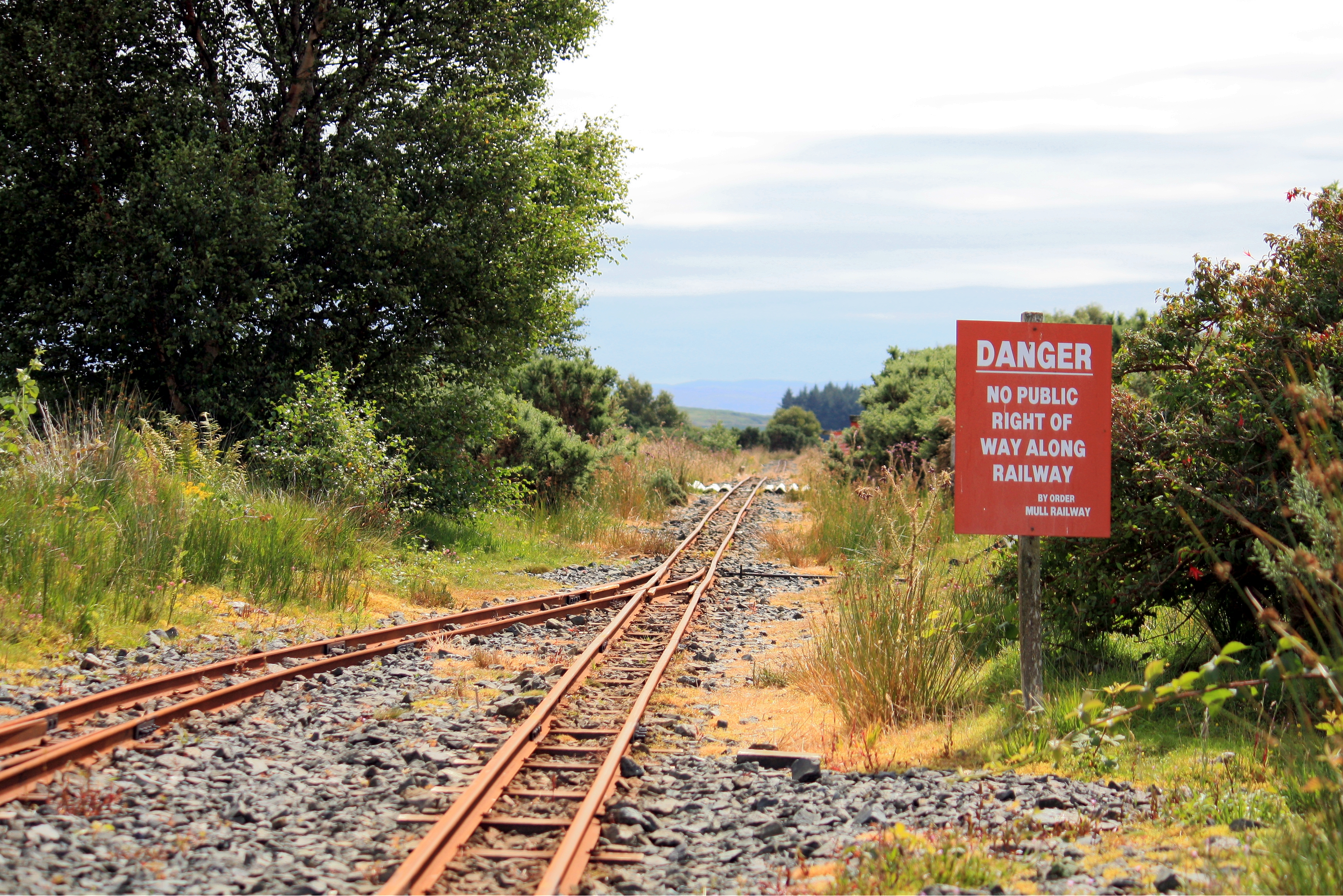
Craignure in 2011

In 1975, the then-owner of Torosay Castle, David James decided to open the house and gardens to the public. Local businessman Graham Ellis, a railway enthusiast, suggested that a narrow-gauge railway might be the ideal way to transport visitors from the ferry terminal 1 1/2 mi (2.4 km) away, whilst also becoming a tourist attraction in its own right.

Although planning permission was granted in 1975, it was not until April 1982 that construction got under way. The line was completed in May 1983, with the first test run taking place on the 22nd of that month. The first experimental service started on 18 August 1983 with the official opening of the line taking place on 22 June the following year. Up to 2010, the line had carried over 25,000 passengers per annum.

In 2010, Torosay Castle was advertised for sale. Due to uncertainty over the future of the estate, the Mull and West Highland Narrow Gauge Railway Company announced the formal closure of the line on 28 October 2010 but some services were resumed for part of 2011 (see below). The company stated that it intended to investigate alternative sites that the railway could be relocated to.

On 4 December 2010, a special "last day" was held. Ferry company Caledonian MacBrayne supported the last day by offering a special ticket deal to Mull, and issued commemorative posters. The final train was driven by the line's founders, Martin Eastwood and Graham Ellis. It was double headed by Lady of the Isles and Victoria, with Lady of the Isles bearing the Balamory Express headboard. Every carriage on the line was in the train.

The closure of the Isle of Mull Railway was described by the local Federation of Small Businesses tourism representative as "a significant blow to the tourist economy, not just on the Isle of Mull but the mainland too". Chris James, the owner of Torosay Castle, commented upon the operators of the Isle of Mull Railway in a Scottish newspaper—that he had "let them play trains for 30 years free of charge". However, the railway did carry over 25,000 passengers a year to the castle.

In 2011, it was reported that the sale of Torosay Castle was not to go ahead. The castle was to open on 45 days in 2011, against 245 previously. The reduction in opening days meant that it would not be viable to operate the railway, although the track remained in situ as of March. Locomotives Glen Auldyn and Lady of the Isles were reported to have been removed to the mainland for safe keeping.

A limited service operated over the Easter 2011 holiday and again from Friday 27 May 2011 until Thursday 1 September 2011. The final trains ran on 1 September 2011 hauled by the steam locomotive Victoria.

Victoria was removed on 8 September to the Rudyard Lake Steam Railway in Staffordshire where she was used at their steam gala and she remains there as an often used and important locomotive in their fleet.

A possible move of the whole railway to Balloch on Loch Lomond was reported in July 2011. The proposal was to lay the line on the trackbed of the former North Clyde Line between the former Balloch Central and Balloch Pier stations, which closed in 1986. The line was to connect with the pier from where the paddle steamer Maid of the Loch will operate when she returns to service in 2013. As of July 2011, discussions were taking place between the owners of the Isle of Mull Railway and Scottish Enterprise about the plans to relocate the railway. A formal feasibility study was undertaken. Loch Lomond and The Trossachs National Park, the Loch Lomond Shores complex and West Dunbartonshire Council were consulted about the proposal, with the response described as "very encouraging". However, the proposal failed to go ahead due to concerns that the rolling stock would have insufficient capacity to cater for number of passengers expected. The track is to be lifted and all assets of the railway will be sold.

The track was lifted in October 2012 and all of the track, rolling stock and some of the locomotives were bought by the Leek and Rudyard Railway which had been recently come under new management. Victoria, Glen Auldyn, Frances and Waverley are all still at Rudyard with Frances being the most frequently used diesel.

All 4 locomotives are run together to celebrate the history of the Isle Of Mull Railway once a year with the Isle of Mull Gala. Unfortunately, the Lady of the Isles did not go with the rest of the locos to Rudyard as she is privately owned.

== Stations ==
- Craignure NM 724 369 56°28′11″N 5°41′41″W
- Torosay Castle NM 732 355 56°27′27″N 5°40′50″W

== Locomotives ==
There were six locomotives on the line.

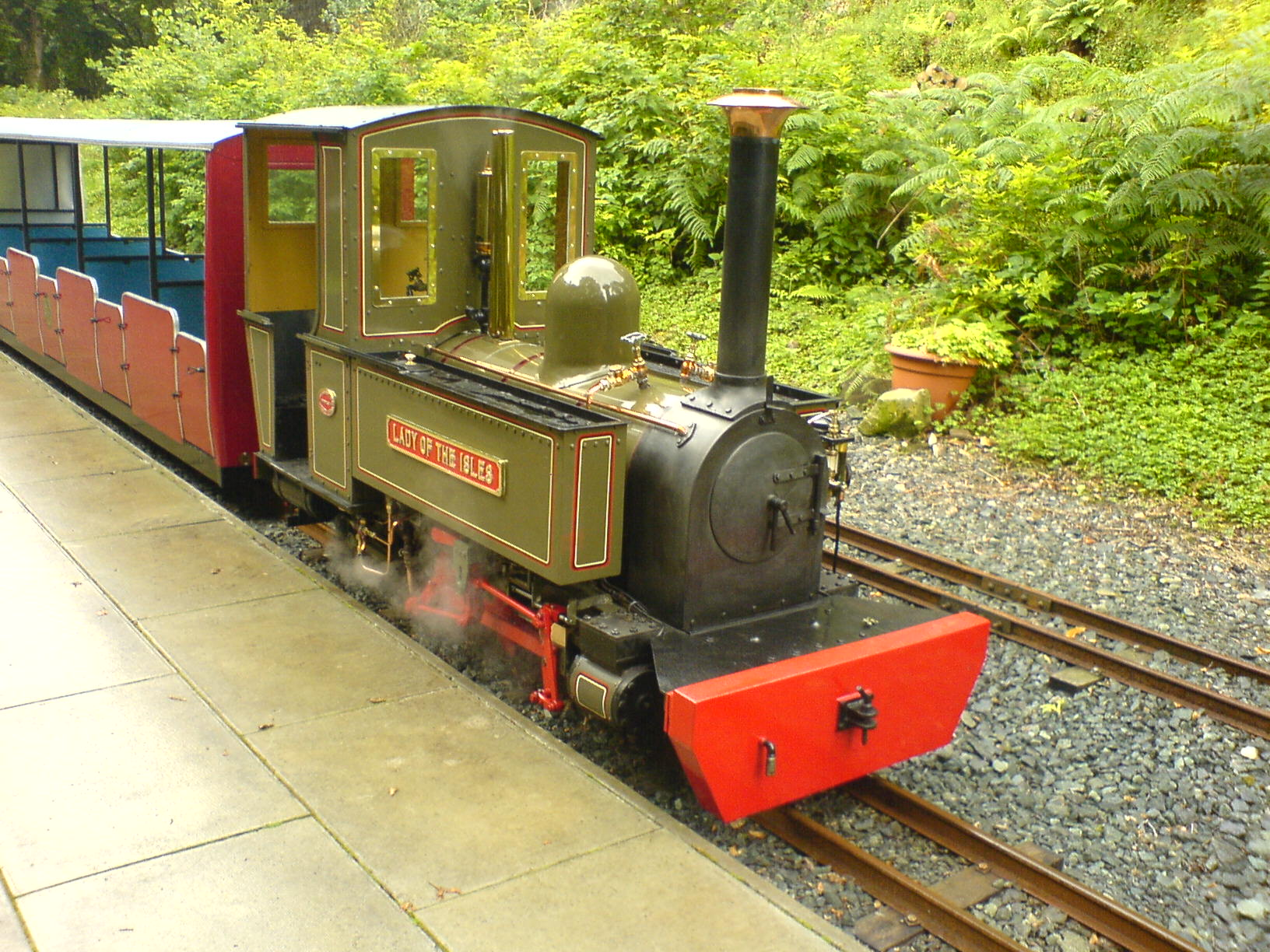
Lady of the Isles

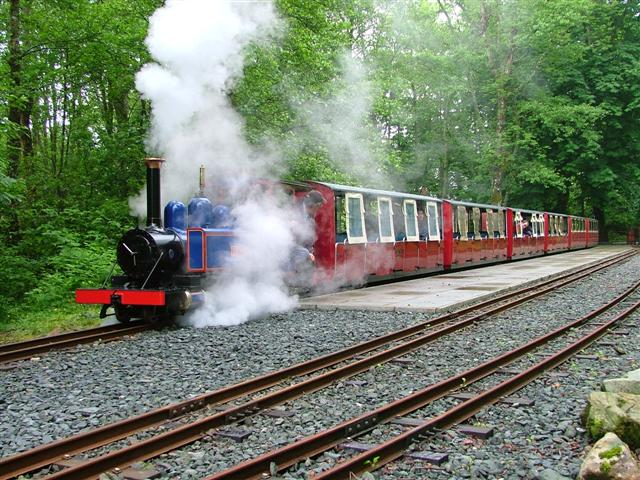
Victoria on a passenger train

=== Steam ===
- Lady of the Isles 2-6-4T built 1981. Was used on the Suffolk Miniature Railway at Kessingland, Suffolk before entering service on the Isle of Mull Railway. This engine was inspired by another Roger Marsh locomotive, Trevithick now on the Royal Victoria Railway.
- Victoria 2-6-2T built by Mouse Boiler Works in 1993. Based on the Victorian Railways NA class locomotives built by Baldwin, examples of which are preserved on the Puffing Billy Railway, Australia.
- Waverley 4-4-2 built by David Curwen in 1948. Was originally named Black Prince and originally used on a railway in Weymouth, Dorset. Waverley has been based at Rudyard Lake Steam Railway, in Staffordshire since 2003, on permanent loan, and has been repainted apple green

=== Diesel ===
- Frances, BB wheel arrangement. built 1999 by Mouse Boiler Works. Powered by a Perkins 1000 diesel engine, hydraulic transmission. Weight 2 tonnes.
- Glen Audlyn, BB wheel arrangement. Built on Mull by Bob Davies in 1986. Powered by a Perkins 4108 diesel engine from a Commer van. Hydraulic transmission. Rebuilt 2013 with a new engine and now also based at Rudyard Lake Steam Railway
- The Green Diesel, formerly operated at the Great Central Railway, Loughborough. Based on a Class 26 locomotive. Powered by a Morris Minor engine with mechanical transmission giving four forward and four reverse gears.

== Rolling stock ==
There were 12 bogie coaches, three 4-wheel wagons and three ballast wagons.

== Television ==
The Isle of Mull Railway featured in an episode of the second series of the CBeebies TV programme Balamory. Filming took place in the autumn of 2002.
