= MV Isle of Mull =

Scottish ferry built in 1987

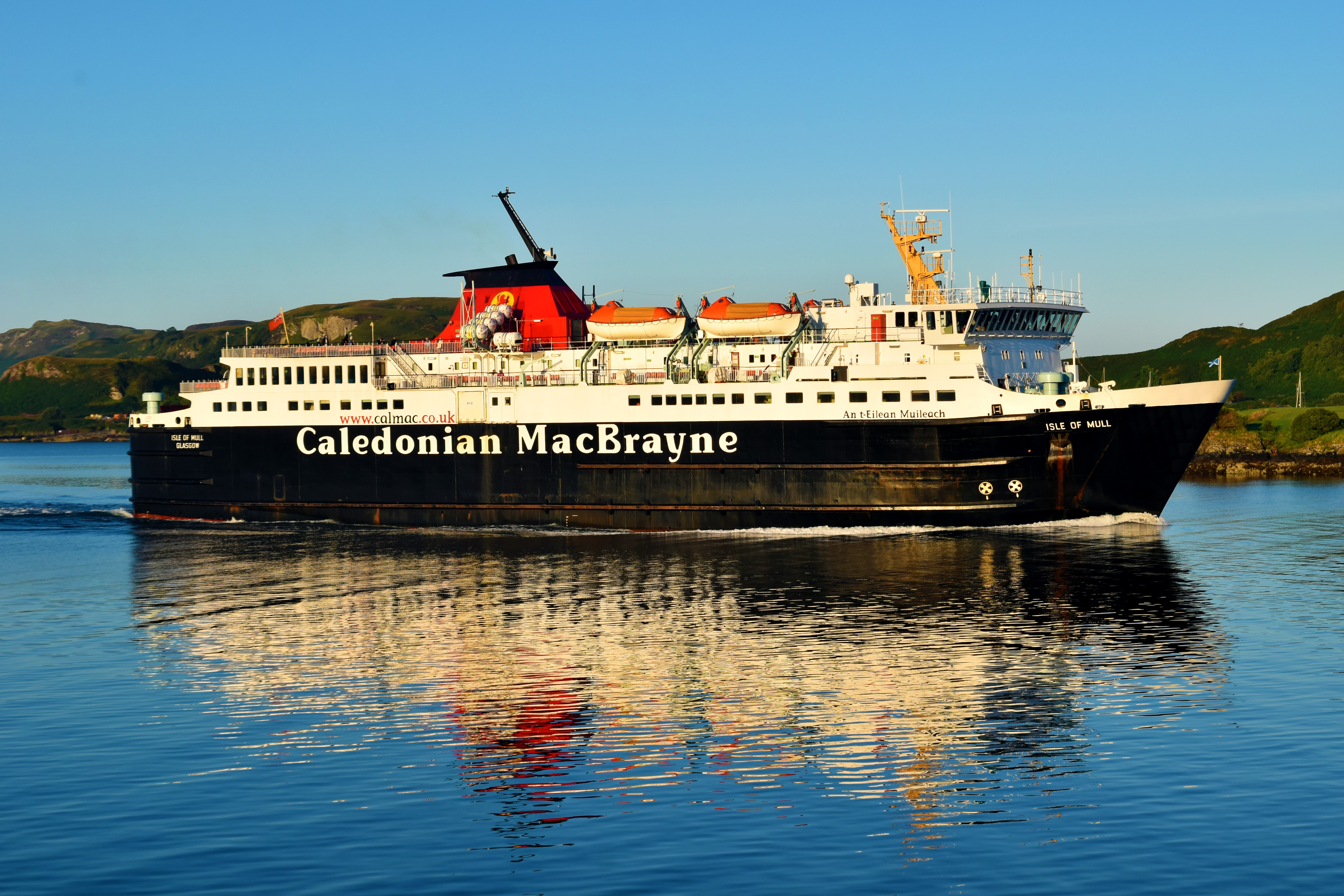
- Sailing from Oban to Craignure, 1 September 2021.

History

United Kingdom
- Name: MV Isle of Mull; Scottish Gaelic: An t-Eilean Muileach
- Owner: Caledonian Maritime Assets
- Operator: Caledonian MacBrayne
- Port of registry: Glasgow
- Route: Oban - Craignure
- Builder: Ferguson Shipbuilders, Port Glasgow
- Yard number: 572
- Launched: 8 December 1987
- Christened: by Princess Alexandra, The Honourable Lady Ogilvy
- Maiden voyage: 11 April 1988
- Identification: IMO number: 8608339; MMSI Number: 232343000; Callsign: MJCE3
- Status: In service

General characteristics
- Tonnage: 4,719 gt
- Length: 90.3 m (296 ft 3 in); 84.9 m (278 ft 7 in) before 1988
- Beam: 15.8 m (51 ft 10 in)
- Draft: 3.19 m (10 ft 6 in)
- Propulsion: Mirrlees Blackstone: 8MB275T Diesel
- Speed: 15 kn (28 km/h) (service)
- Capacity: 962 passenger, 64 cars
- Crew: 28

MV Isle of Mull is one of the larger ferries operated by Caledonian MacBrayne from Oban on the west of Scotland.

== History ==
MV Isle of Mull was designed for the route between Oban and Craignure on the Isle of Mull. After being launched on the River Clyde in 1987, she entered service on 11 April 1988, in place of the older and slower MV Caledonia.

However the new vessel was seriously overweight – by more than 100 tons – due to both design and steel supply, British Steel had installed a new computerised gauge control at its Dalzell Plate production unit, and during the initial production of steel plate after its introduction it tended to produce plates still within the allowed manufacturing specification, but at or near the upper gauge allowed in the tolerance – resulting in the steel tending to be heavier than designed.

In late autumn 1988, she was taken out of service for two weeks and sent to Tees Dockyard Ltd in Middlesbrough to be lengthened by 5.4 m (17 ft 9 in). The extent of this implant can most easily be observed when climbing the stairs from the car deck to the passenger accommodation. These stairs used to be a single flight, but now have a level section halfway up. The new length of hull made the vessel better both in terms of vehicle capacity but also in that she handled better at sea with her overall speed increased slightly.

In the late 1990s, she underwent internal refurbishment. Her cafeteria was redecorated and the serving area modified – setting the standard for the rest of the fleet. The shop was moved to a more prominent position in the entrance concourse and she received new seating covers etc. Isle of Mull underwent another major refurbishment in 2005. The cafeteria was redesigned with a new service area layout, including self-service tea and coffee machines and was renamed the Mariners Cafeteria. A coffee bar was installed in the viewing lounge at the after end of the ship opposite the doors leading out to the open deck which overlooks the rope handling area of the ship and is named the Coffee Cabin. The bar was also renamed The Still.

In September 2024, CalMac confirmed provisional plans to retire Isle of Mull and MV Isle of Lewis after the new vessels MV Claymore and MV Lochmor are introduced to the fleet. On 9 December 2025, CalMac initially announced that Isle of Mull would be retired from the fleet in the summer of 2026. On 25 September 2026, CalMac published a revised Vessel Deployment, Disposal and Cascade Plan, indicating that Isle of Mull would remain in the fleet until suitable replacement vessels enter service to replace her on the Oban to Craignure route.

== Layout ==
The totally enclosed car deck has room for up to 66 cars. Headroom on the bow and stern ramps is 4.7 m (15 ft 5 in). She is equipped with a bow visor, bow ramp and stern ramp. The two-part folding bow ramp is shaped like an inverted "L". When raised, the main section plugs the access to the car deck. The forward section folds out flat upon contact with the linkspan.

Above the car deck are two levels of accommodation, providing shelter and facilities for up to 1000 passengers. The first deck houses the cafeteria at the bow, with the main entrance concourse and shop immediately aft. Behind this are lounges, toilets and the information desk, with the bar at the stern. The next deck has an observation lounge at the stern and crew accommodation further forward. External deck space stretches from the lounge to just short of the bridge on both sides. An observation lounge on the top deck has seating aft of the funnel. The large amount of open deck space is one factor that makes the Isle of Mull popular with tourists.

== Service ==
Isle of Mull has operated the service between Oban and Craignure on the Isle of Mull since 1988. She completes the sailing in 45 minutes on a good day, although the short turnaround and poor manoeuvrability in even light winds lead to frequent delays and increased cancellations. Additional sailings are provided by Loch Frisa, introduced in June 2022. Isle of Mull also provides one of four weekly crossings between the mainland and the island of Colonsay in winter, this being the Monday sailing.

Isle of Mull was the regular winter relief between Ullapool and Stornoway from 1989 until 1998, covering for overhauls of Suilven and Isle of Lewis. In October 1989, her larger passenger capacity was required at Stornoway for those travelling to the Mòd, while Suilven covered the Oban to Craignure service for 10 days. She also put in a one-off appearance at Ardrossan and Brodick in December 2007, covering the overhaul of Caledonian Isles. During the winter of 2021/22, Isle of Mull was the scheduled winter relief vessel between Oban and Castlebay and Oban and Lochboisdale, a role which continued the following winter. As Isle of Mull cannot berth in Mallaig due to her length, she sails from her familiar port of Oban. In April 2024, Isle of Mull again relieved Lord of the Isles on the route from Lochboisdale to Oban. During this time, she operated an amended timetable incorporating sailings to Castlebay due to a technical fault with Isle of Lewis.

In addition to these roles, Isle of Mull has made occasional sailings to Coll and Tiree over the years. Her higher passenger capacity compared to Clansman and Lord of the Isles proves a massive help during the annual Tiree Music Festival every July, and when she needs to tend to the needs of both Coll and Tiree at busy times such as this, another vessel, usually Clansman, will look after the Craignure service. Isle of Mull has also provided emergency services to Islay, usually sailing to and from Port Askaig, whilst also calling at Colonsay in each direction if required. Her own refit and annual survey is often carried out in December at Dales Marine Services in Aberdeen.

In August 2022, Isle of Mull made her first full appearance on the triangle connecting Uig, Lochmaddy and Tarbert, while Hebrides underwent repairs to her firefighting equipment. In April 2024, however, following redevelopment works at Uig Pier, it was confirmed that Isle of Mull can no longer operate regularly from there due to tidal constraints.

On 28 December 2024, it was announced that the marine evacuation system had failed on Isle of Mull, with CalMac warning that the subsequent repair could take months. Her capacity was subsequently limited to 45 passengers until she was repaired in June 2025.

== See also ==
- Caledonian MacBrayne fleet
