= MV Loch Frisa =

Car/passenger ferry launched 2014

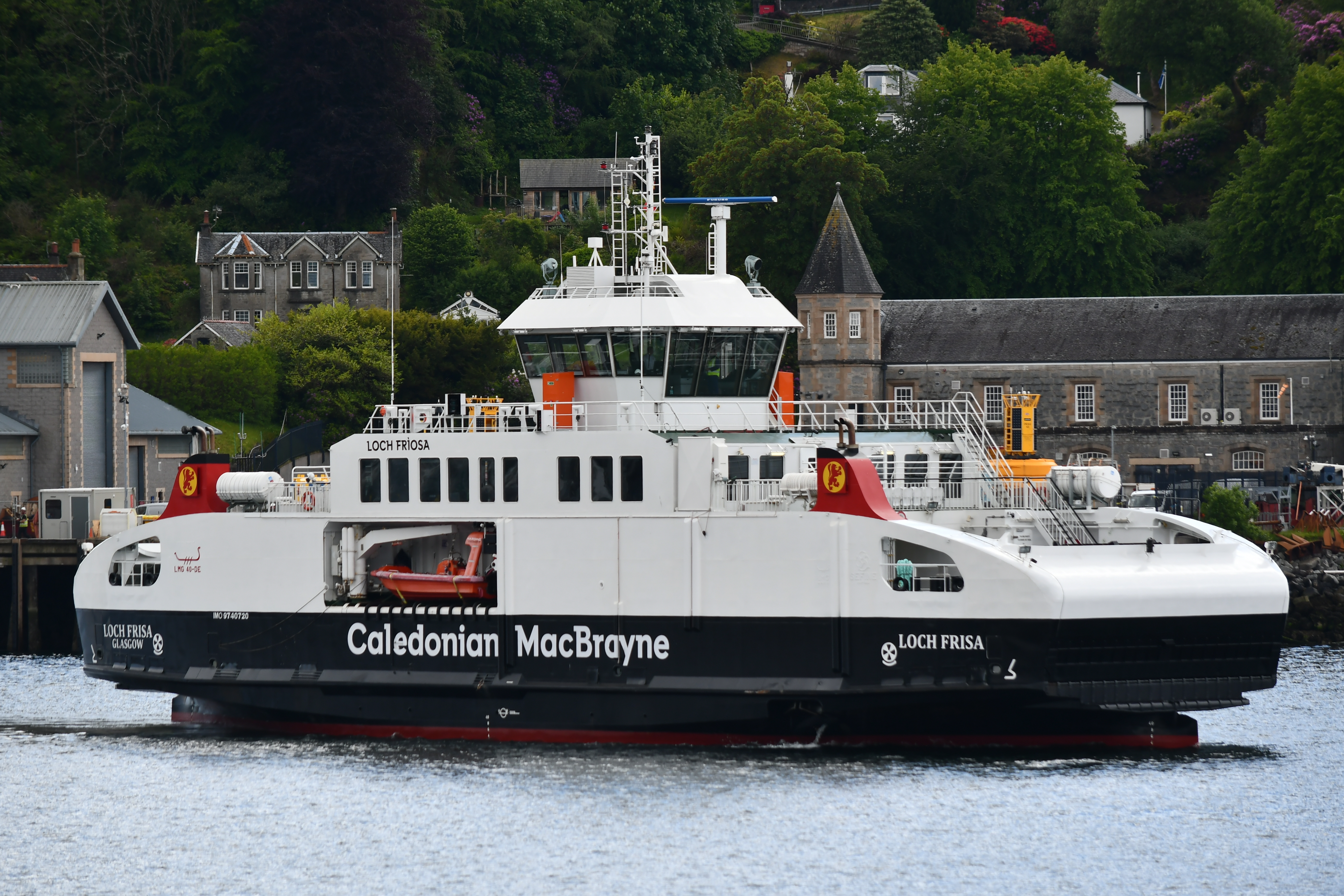
- MV Loch Frisa at Oban, June 2022.

History

United Kingdom
- Name: MV Loch Frisa; Scottish Gaelic: Loch Friosa
- Namesake: Loch Frisa
- Owner: Caledonian Maritime Assets
- Operator: Caledonian MacBrayne
- Route: Oban - Craignure
- Acquired: 5 October 2021
- In service: 13 June 2022
- Renamed: 6 June 2022
- Status: In service

Norway
- Name: MV Utne
- Namesake: Utne
- Operator: Norled
- Route: Utne - Kvanndal
- Builder: Sefine Shipyard
- Launched: 2014
- Identification: IMO number: 9740720; MMSI number: 257774600; Callsign: LCBJ

General characteristics
- Tonnage: 1,160 Gross Tonnage; 348 Net Tonnage; 210 Deadweight
- Length: 49.9 m (164 ft)
- Beam: 14 m (46 ft)
- Draught: 3.7 m (12 ft)
- Deck clearance: 4.6 m (15 ft)
- Propulsion: 2 × Scania AB diesel engines; 2 × Veth Propulsion azimuth propulsion units
- Speed: 12 kn (22 km/h)
- Capacity: 195 passengers; 34–40 cars; 4 trucks

MV Loch Frisa (Scottish Gaelic: Loch Friosa) is a ferry bought by Caledonian Maritime Assets for operation by Caledonian MacBrayne to serve between Oban and Craignure in Scotland. She was originally named MV Utne and operated by Norled from 2015 to 2021. In December 2021, following a naming competition, CMAL announced her renaming as MV Loch Frisa.

== History ==
MV Utne was launched in 2014 and operated by Norled from 2015. In 2021, Norled sold her to Caledonian Maritime Assets for €6.6 million (£5.6 million), as they were replacing their diesel-powered vessels with zero-emission battery-electric vessels.

Following a public vote, she was renamed to MV Loch Frisa, with the other options being Glen Forsa and Torosay. She was modified for her new role by Dales Marine Services in Leith at a cost of £3.4 million. She was renamed in Craignure on 6 June 2022, and entered service in June 2022.

There was an earlier Loch Frisa which served in Scottish waters, the MacBrayne cargo steamer SS Loch Frisa, a general cargo ship which sailed under MacBrayne's houseflag in the 1950s and early 1960s.

== Layout ==
Loch Frisa is a double-ended ro-ro ferry. As she has no crew accommodation, crew are based ashore. In Norway, she had two crews and was able to operate 18 hours a day.

== Service ==
Loch Frisa was designed for service in a Norwegian fjord, and operated between Utne and Kvanndal on the Hardangerfjord, a sheltered crossing of 2.5 miles. Upon transfer to CalMac, she initially joined MV Isle of Mull on the Oban to Craignure, Isle of Mull route, replacing MV Coruisk as the second vessel. Her first public voyage, carrying four cars from Craignure to Oban, was on 13 June 2022. MV Coruisk moved back to Mallaig in summer 2022. During 2022-23 winter overhauls, Loch Frisa operated a single vessel timetable. Due to delays in the annual overhaul programme, Isle of Mull was redeployed to South Uist and Coruisk remained on the Oban - Craignure route with Loch Frisa from 26 March to 16 April and 13 to 26 May 2023.

Loch Frisa was again rostered to be the sole ferry on the Oban - Craignure route for the winter of 2024-25, however the introduction into service of MV Glen Sannox on the Arran service in January 2025 allowed for MV Isle of Arran to be deployed to Oban to provide additional crossings to Craignure.
