= MV Clansman =

1998 ferry

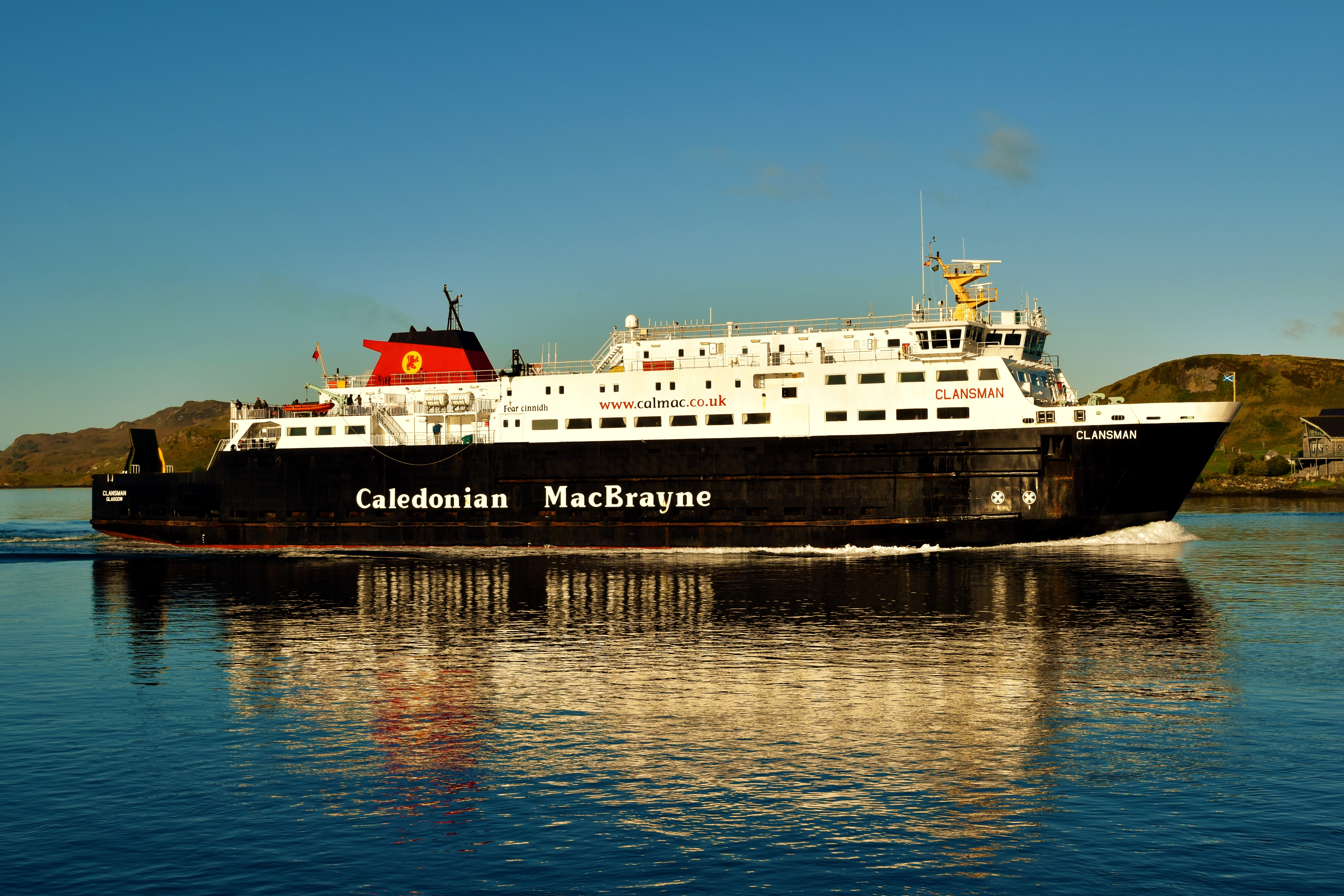
- MV Clansman leaving Oban for Coll & Tiree in May 2019

History

United Kingdom
- Name: MV Clansman; Scottish Gaelic: Fear-cinnidh
- Owner: Caledonian Maritime Assets
- Operator: Caledonian MacBrayne
- Port of registry: Glasgow, Scotland
- Route: Oban–Coll/Tiree; Oban–Colonsay; Oban-Castlebay(summer only)
- Builder: Appledore Shipbuilders, Devon, England
- Launched: 27 March 1998
- Maiden voyage: 4 July 1998
- Identification: IMO number: 9158953; Callsign: MXXG8; MMSI Number: 232003288
- Status: in service

General characteristics
- Tonnage: 5,499 gt
- Length: 99 m (325 ft)
- Beam: 15.8 m (51 ft 10 in)
- Draft: 3.2 m (10 ft 6 in)
- Propulsion: 2 × MAK 8 M32, Gear Box: 2 - Ulstein 1500 AGSC; Bow Thruster: 2 × Electric Ulstein 90TV each 7.0 tf (69 kN) thrust
- Speed: 16.5 kn (30.6 km/h) (service)
- Capacity: 638 passengers, 80 cars
- Crew: 28

MV Clansman is a ferry operated by Caledonian MacBrayne, operating from Oban on the west coast of Scotland.

== History ==
The present MV Clansman is the fifth vessel to carry the name in the Caledonian MacBrayne fleet over the years. The most recent predecessor was the 1964 built hoist loading ferry. Launched on 27 March 1998 at Appledore Shipbuilders in North Devon, she entered service four months later. As the third-largest vessel in the fleet, she brought new levels of capacity and passenger comfort to the routes. The main complaint passengers had was Clansman's lack of open deckspace. The design of the ship was such that exterior areas for passengers came at a premium. Calmac remedied this problem by adding an extension above the area aft of the bar during her annual overhaul in 2003.

Clansman has an almost identical sister ship, MV Hebrides, built in 2000 to a similar specification.

== Layout ==
A cafeteria is situated at the bow, with an observation lounge directly above. Aft are a series of lounges, along with the shop and bar. Above is crew accommodation and a relatively small amount of open deck space. She lacks a forward deck.

The car deck has room for approximately 90 cars and has a mezzanine deck on the starboard side, which can be raised or lowered to allow loading of up to 10 additional cars.

The upper deck was extended aft to allow for more open deck space and some deck space sheltered from the elements.

The ship has a Fast Rescue Craft, with liferafts situated behind the bridge. During her 2018 overhaul, the lifeboats located abreast of the funnel were removed, with new liferafts being installed in their place. One of the old lifeboats was sold to Arctic explorers who are planning on sailing it to Tromso, Norway.

== Service ==
Designed specifically for the Oban – Castlebay / Lochboisdale and Oban – Coll / Tiree services, Clansman replaced MV Lord of the Isles. At 99 m (325 ft) in length, she is the largest vessel that can safely navigate the numerous channels on her routes. She was, however, too large to call at Tobermory, which was dropped from the Coll/Tiree sailings on her introduction.

Each winter since her introduction, Clansman has relieved the larger Calmac units for their annual refit, leaving the route she was built for with Lord of the Isles. She has seen service at Lewis, Uig, Mull and Arran.

A breakdown on 17 June 2010 took Clansman out of service for crankshaft repairs and problems found during reassembly of the engine resulted in an extended disruption to services. CalMac tried to arrange a replacement vessel, but none could be found for lease. Out of action for six weeks, Clansman returned to service later in the summer and ran extra services in August for the Barra Fest music festival. However, she broke down again en route to Barra after the port engine developed a fault. Repair was effected quickly, but the event caused further disruption at the busiest time of the year.

Since April 2016, Clansman serves Coll, Tiree and Colonsay from Oban, with MV Isle of Lewis operating a daily dedicated service to Castlebay and MV Lord of the Isles serving Lochboisdale from Mallaig, ending South Uist's direct link with Oban. From 30 September to 17 October 2016, Clansman relieved on the Uig triangle in place of MV Hebrides after the latter was sent to dry dock to repair damage sustained in a collision in Lochmaddy Harbour.

In February 2018, Clansman carried out berthing trials at the new Brodick ferry terminal and Troon before taking over the Ardrossan-Brodick ferry crossing while MV Caledonian Isles undertook berthing trials at Troon. After the berthing trials, Clansman went to the Garvel dry dock at the James Watt Dock in Greenock for her annual overhaul. While berthing there, she clipped a bank and severely damaged a propeller and prop-shaft. The damage meant that the overhaul took significantly longer than planned, delaying the overhaul of MV Hebrides. Parts of the propulsion system were sent to a specialist firm in Denmark and new propeller blades were made from scratch. From February to May 2018, Clansman's routes were operated by MV Lord of the Isles. Temporary repairs were effected allowing Clansman to cover the overhaul of Hebrides, relieving on the Uig triangle. After returning briefly to Oban for a fortnight, Clansman returned to Garvel dry-dock at Greenock on 2 June for the repairs to be completed. She returned to service at Oban on 9 June.

During Clansman's annual overhaul in February 2022, unexpected corrosion was found to steelwork on board leading to the replacement of fifty square metres of steel. This severely delayed Clansman's return to service, which had major knock-on effects across the rest of the fleet, including delaying the overhaul of Hebrides.
