= Caledonian MacBrayne =

Ferry operator in Scotland

CalMac Ferries Ltd
- Trade name: Caledonian MacBrayne, CalMac
- Type: Government-owned service
- Industry: Transport
- Founded: 1973
- Headquarters: Gourock, Scotland
- Number of locations: 50 ports and harbours across Scotland
- Area served: Firth of Clyde, Outer Hebrides, Inner Hebrides
- Key people: Duncan Mackison (CEO)
- Services: Ferry operations between mainland Scotland and islands
- Revenue: £329.4 million (2024-25)
- Operating income: £5.46 million (2024-25)
- Net income: £5.18 million (2024-25)
- Total assets: £20.69 million (2024-25)
- Owner: Scottish Government
- Number of employees: 1,600 (about 1,000 sea going) (2026)
- Parent: David MacBrayne
- Divisions: Argyll Ferries (2011 to 2019)
- Subsidiaries: Caledonian MacBrayne Crewing (Guernsey) Ltd (employer of sea going staff)
- Website: www.calmac.co.uk

Caledonian MacBrayne (Scottish Gaelic: Caledonian Mac a' Bhriuthainn), in short form CalMac, is the trade name of CalMac Ferries Ltd, the major operator of passenger and vehicle ferries to the west coast of Scotland, serving ports on the mainland and 22 of the major islands. It is a subsidiary of holding company David MacBrayne, which is owned by the Scottish Government.

Its predecessor, the government owned Caledonian MacBrayne Ltd, was formed in 1973 as a ferry owner and operator. In 2006 these functions were separated to meet EU requirements for competitive tendering. The company, renamed Caledonian Maritime Assets (CMAL), continued to own the Caledonian MacBrayne fleet and assets. The contract for operating Clyde and Hebrides Ferry Services using these vessels was put out to open competitive tender. CalMac Ferries Ltd was created in October 2006 as a separate company to bid for the work. CalMac was awarded the contract, as well as a later competitive procurement process, and since 1 October 2007 has operated the services.

CalMac operates 37 ferries, with one vessel expected to enter service shortly. Ten further vessels are currently under construction or on order for the fleet. The company provides lifeline services to 23 islands off the west coast of Scotland, as well as operating routes in the Firth of Clyde. The company serves over 50 ports and harbours on the west coast of Scotland, with CMAL owning 16 of these ports and harbours. Caledonian MacBrayne operate on average over 162,700 sailings annually. 2018 was the company's busiest year in terms of passenger numbers, carrying an estimated 5,309,771 passengers.

== History ==
Previous logo

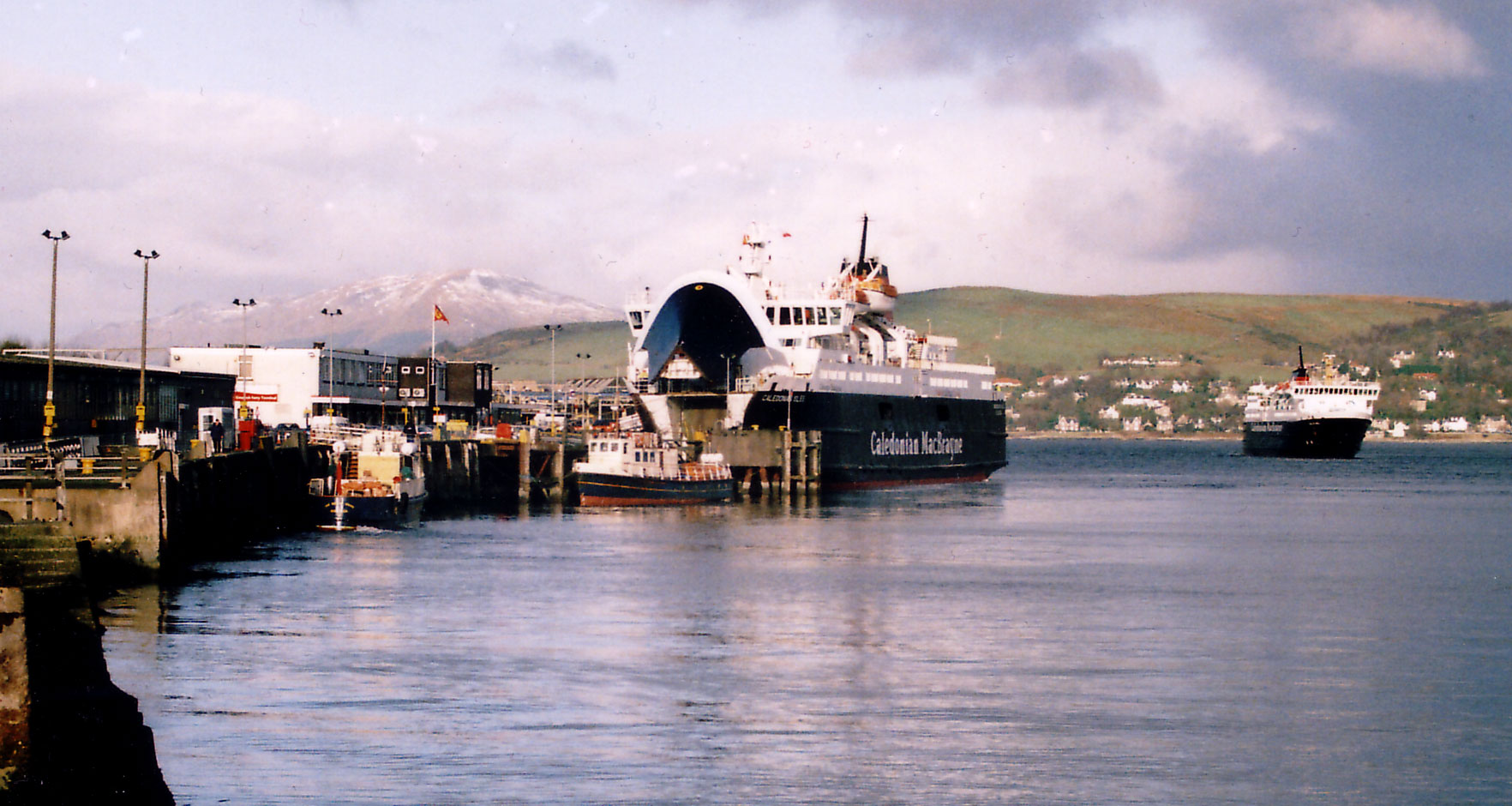
The Caledonian MacBrayne headquarters building at Gourock pierhead and a visit from MV Caledonian Isles and MV Isle of Mull

=== David MacBrayne ===
MacBrayne's, initially known as David Hutcheson & Co., began in 1851 as a private steamship operator when G. and J. Burns, operators of the largest of the Clyde fleets, decided to concentrate on coastal and transatlantic services and handed control of their river and Highland steamers to a new company in which Hutcheson, their manager of these services, became senior partner. One of the other partners was David MacBrayne (1817–1907), nephew of Messrs. Burns. In 1878, the company passed to David MacBrayne.

Their main route went from Glasgow down the Firth of Clyde through the Crinan Canal to Oban and Fort William, and on through the Caledonian Canal to Inverness. Services were later added to Islay and the Outer Hebrides. In 1928, the company ran into financial difficulties, and the business was acquired by Coast Lines and the London, Midland and Scottish Railway (LMS Railway). In 1948, the shares in the company owned by the LMS Railway passed to the British Transport Commission, thus partially nationalising it. In July 1969, Coast Lines' 50% shareholding passed into state ownership, so that the company became wholly nationalised, and all the shares were transferred to the state-owned Scottish Transport Group.

=== Caledonian Steam Packet Company ===
The Caledonian Railway at first used the services of various early private operators of Clyde steamers, then began operating steamers on its own account on 1 January 1889 to compete better with the North British Railway and the Glasgow and South Western Railway. It extended its line to bypass the G&SW's Prince's Pier at Greenock and continue on to the fishing village of Gourock, where they had purchased the harbour.

After years of fierce competition between all the fleets, the Caledonian and G&SW were merged in 1923 into the London, Midland and Scottish Railway and their fleets were amalgamated into the Caledonian Steam Packet Company. Their funnels were painted yellow with a black top. At the same time, the North British Railway fleet became part of the London and North Eastern Railway (which built the PS Waverley in 1947). With nationalisation in 1948, the LMS and LNER fleets were amalgamated under British Railways with the name Clyde Shipping Services. In 1957, a reorganisation restored the CSP name, and in 1965 a red lion was added to each side of the black-topped yellow funnels. The headquarters remained at Gourock pierhead.

At the end of December 1968, management of the CSP passed to the Scottish Transport Group, which gained control of MacBrayne's the following June. The MacBrayne service from Gourock to Ardrishaig ended on 30 September 1969, leaving the Clyde entirely to the CSP.

=== Caledonian MacBrayne ===
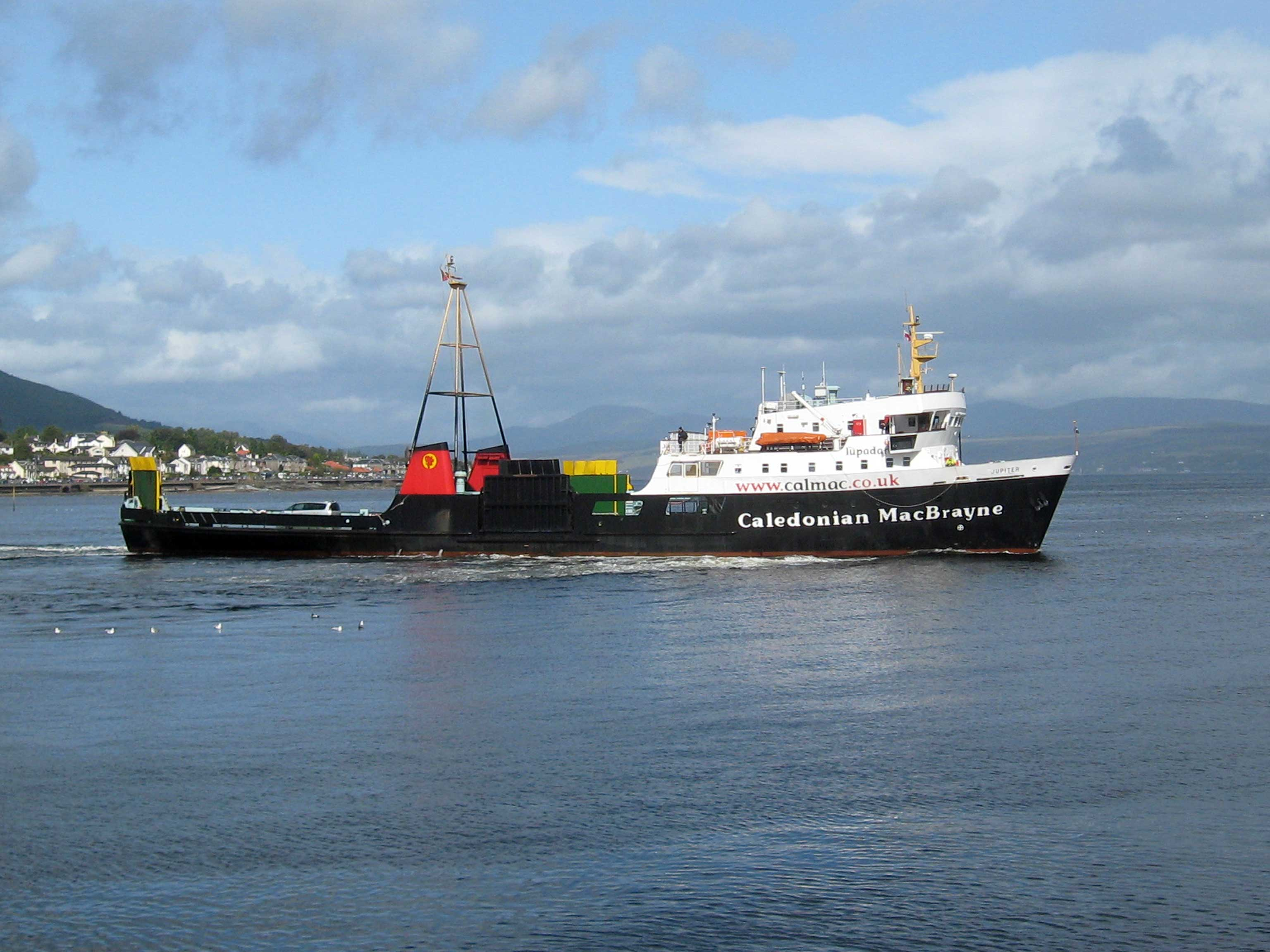
MV Jupiter leaving Dunoon

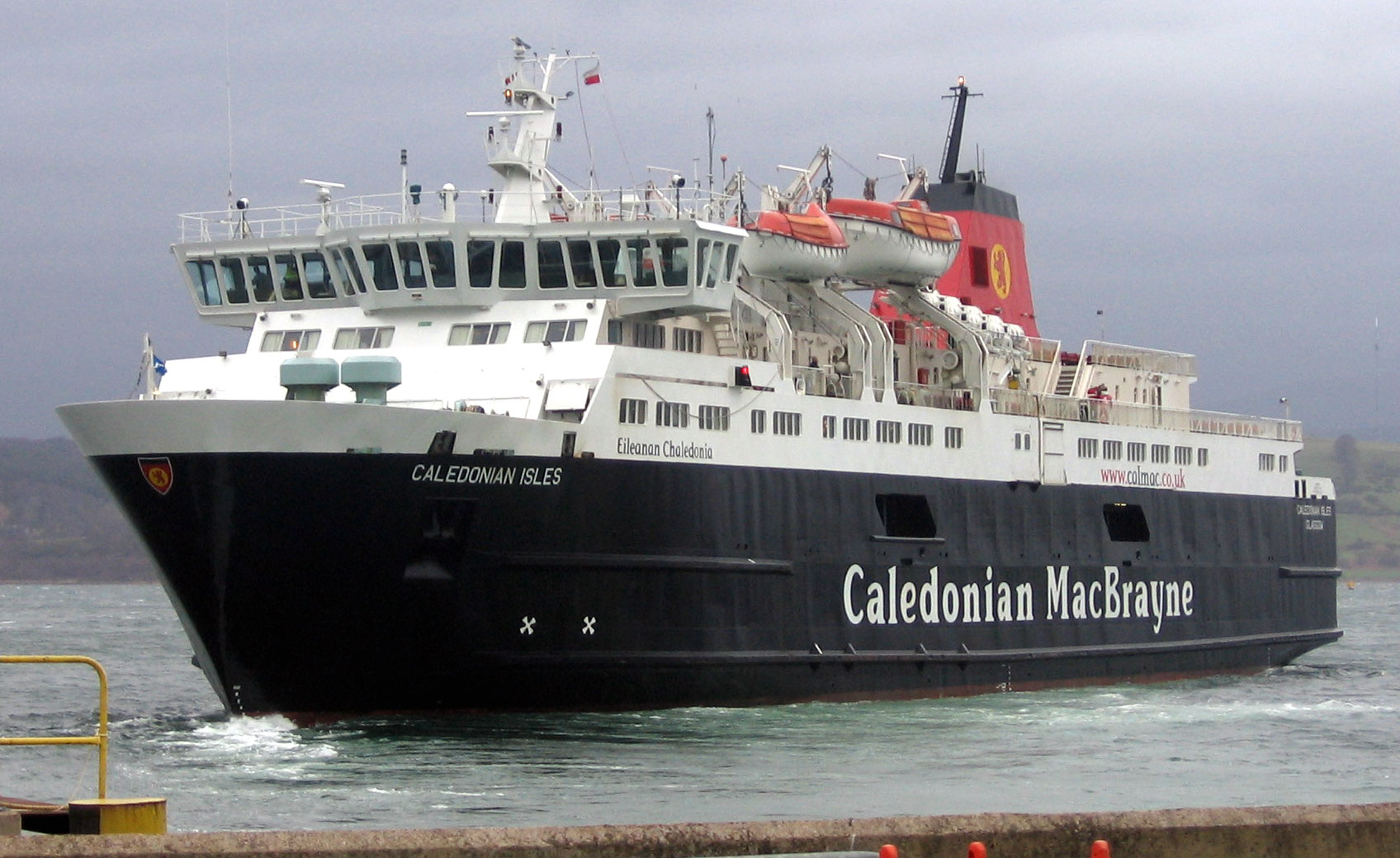
MV Caledonian Isles at Gourock

On 1 January 1973, the Caledonian Steam Packet Co. acquired most of the ships and routes of MacBrayne's and commenced joint Clyde and West Highland operations under the new name of Caledonian MacBrayne, with a combined headquarters at Gourock. Funnels were now painted red with a black top, and a yellow circle at the side of the funnel featuring the red Caledonian lion. In 1974, a new car ferry service from Gourock to Dunoon was introduced with the ferries MV Jupiter and MV Juno.

In 1990, the ferry business was spun off as a separate company, keeping the Caledonian MacBrayne brand, and shares were issued in the company. All shares were owned by the state, first in the person of the Secretary of State for Scotland, and (after devolution) by the Scottish Government.

In 1996, CalMac opened its first route outside Scotland, winning a ten-year contract to provide a lifeline service to Rathlin Island in Northern Ireland. This service continued until 2008, when CalMac lost the tender.

A joint venture between Caledonian MacBrayne and the Royal Bank of Scotland named NorthLink Orkney and Shetland Ferries won the tender for the subsidised Northern Isles services, previously run by P&O Scottish Ferries, commencing in 2002. The ambitious programme ran into financial difficulties, and the service was again put out to tender. Caledonian MacBrayne won this tender, and formed a separate company called NorthLink Ferries Limited which began operating the Northern Isles ferry service on 6 July 2006.

=== Restructuring ===
Several groups have proposed privatising the service, and there has been a long commercial and political struggle with a privately owned company, Western Ferries, which has run a rival unsubsidised service from Gourock to Hunters Quay (near Dunoon) since 1973. To meet EU requirements for competitive tendering, the Scottish Executive put the collective Clyde and Hebrides Ferry Services routes out to competitive tender in 2005. As part of this process the Dunoon route was put out as a separate tender. Some island and union groups opposed the tendering process, fearing it would lead to cuts in services and could be a prelude to full privatisation.

To enable competitive bidding on an equal basis, Caledonian MacBrayne was split into two separate companies on 1 October 2006. Caledonian Maritime Assets Limited (CMAL) retained ownership of CalMac vessels and infrastructure, including harbours, while CalMac Ferries Ltd submitted tenders to be the ferry operator. The company of David MacBrayne Ltd, which had been legally dormant for many years, was re-activated as a company wholly owned by the Scottish Government on 4 July 2006. During September 2006, David MacBrayne Group Ltd acquired the entire share capital of CalMac Ferries Ltd. Thus, from leaving the hands of David MacBrayne 78 years earlier in 1928, the west coast ferry service returned to the fold in 2006, vastly enlarged. The David MacBrayne Group Ltd also acquired the full share capital of NorthLink Ferries, and took over operations of the NorthLink routes on 6 July 2006. A further subsidiary company - Rathlin Ferries Ltd - was established by David MacBrayne Group Ltd to operate the Rathlin to Ballycastle service in Northern Ireland.

Three operators submitted bids for the main block of routes, but CalMac retained all its existing routes. On 1 October 2007 CalMac Ferries Ltd began operating these services on a six-year contract. The Gourock to Dunoon service was the subject of a separate tender, but no formal bids were made. In an interim arrangement, CalMac Ferries Ltd continued to provide a subsidised service on this route, using the name Cowal Ferries. The Scottish Government subsequently decided not to subsidise a vehicle service on the Gourock–Dunoon route due to the existence of the rival Western Ferries vehicle service, and the route was put out to tender again, this time with subsidy available only for a passenger services to maintain a direct link between Gourock railway station and Dunoon town centre. In May 2011, Argyll Ferries Ltd, a newly formed subsidiary of David MacBrayne, was named as the preferred bidder for a passenger-only Dunoon-Gourock service. The timetable was extended into the early hours at weekends, with additional sailings integrated with rail services. Two passenger-only ferries, MV Ali Cat and MV Argyll Flyer (formerly MV Banrion Chonomara), were arranged for the run. When the service began on 30 June 2011, preparation of the Argyll Flyer was incomplete, and as an interim measure the cruise boat MV Clyde Clipper was leased from Clyde Cruises. Argyll Ferries was incorporated into Caledonian MacBrayne on 21 January 2019.

On 14 July 2009, it was announced that CalMac would begin Sunday sailings to Stornoway on Lewis from Sunday 19 July. These had historically faced strong opposition from Sabbatarian elements in the Lewis community, particularly the Lord's Day Observance Society and the Free Church of Scotland. However, CalMac stated that EU equality legislation made it unlawful to refuse a service to the whole community because of the religious beliefs of a part of it.

NorthLink Ferries lost the contract for provision of the Northern Isles ferry services to Serco on 29 May 2012.

=== Covid-19: Emergency lifeline timetable ===
During the COVID-19 pandemic, CalMac operated a much reduced timetable. From 22 March 2020, they provided a turn up and go service to ensure essential goods and services were delivered to the islands. There were no reservations and no onboard retail facilities. Timetables were modified to meet local needs, with occasional additional crossings and extended layovers.

The Portavadie, Campbeltown and Armadale services were cancelled. Crossing frequencies were reduced on other routes, with single vessels at Rothesay, Largs and Kennacraig. On the smaller vessels, vehicle occupants were required to remain in their vehicle.

Until Hebrides returned from dry dock in Liverpool, Clansman remained on the Uig triangle, with Lord of the Isles and Isle of Arran providing services to Lochboisdale, Coll/Tiree and Colonsay from Oban. Hebridean Isles operated to Arran (22 April – 2 May) and Islay (27 May – 2 June) while Caledonian Isles and Finlaggan were out of service.

Unused vessels were laid up: Hebridean Isles in Campbeltown; Coruisk at Craignure; Loch Riddon, Loch Linnhe and Loch Fyne at Sandbank; Loch Bhrusda in Mallaig (covered Sound of Barra service while Loch Alainn in Troon); Argyle and Isle of Cumbrae in Rothesay and Isle of Arran in Troon.

=== Post–Covid ===
In the years following the COVID-19 pandemic, the company began to struggle to maintain services due to an increasingly ageing fleet. The situation was exacerbated by long delays to the delivery of two new ferries for the Arran service (MV Glen Sannox and MV Glen Rosa), a situation dubbed by critics as the "ferry fiasco". Glen Sannox, launched in 2017, was not handed over until November 2024, and entered service on 12 January 2025. As of October 2026, Glen Rosa is expected to be delivered no earlier than February 2027. A further four new ferries were ordered from Cemre Shipyard in Turkey.

In May 2024 Transport Scotland granted a contract extension to CalMac to continue to operate the Clyde and Hebrides ferry services until 30 September 2025. In May 2025 Transport Scotland confirmed that CalMac would be directly awarded a contract for a further 10 years, commencing 1 October 2025.

== Service ==
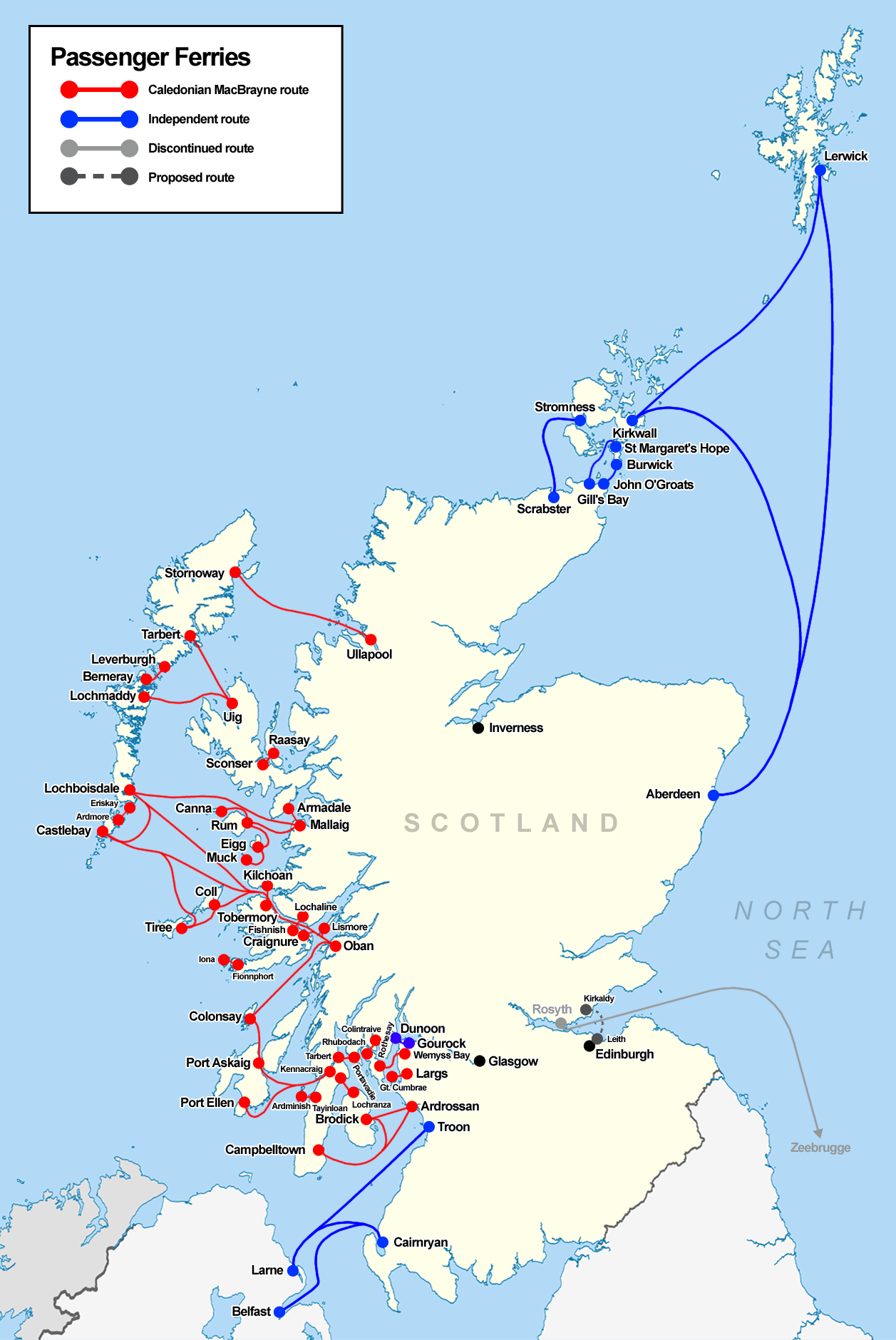
Map of ferry services in Scotland, CalMac services shown in red

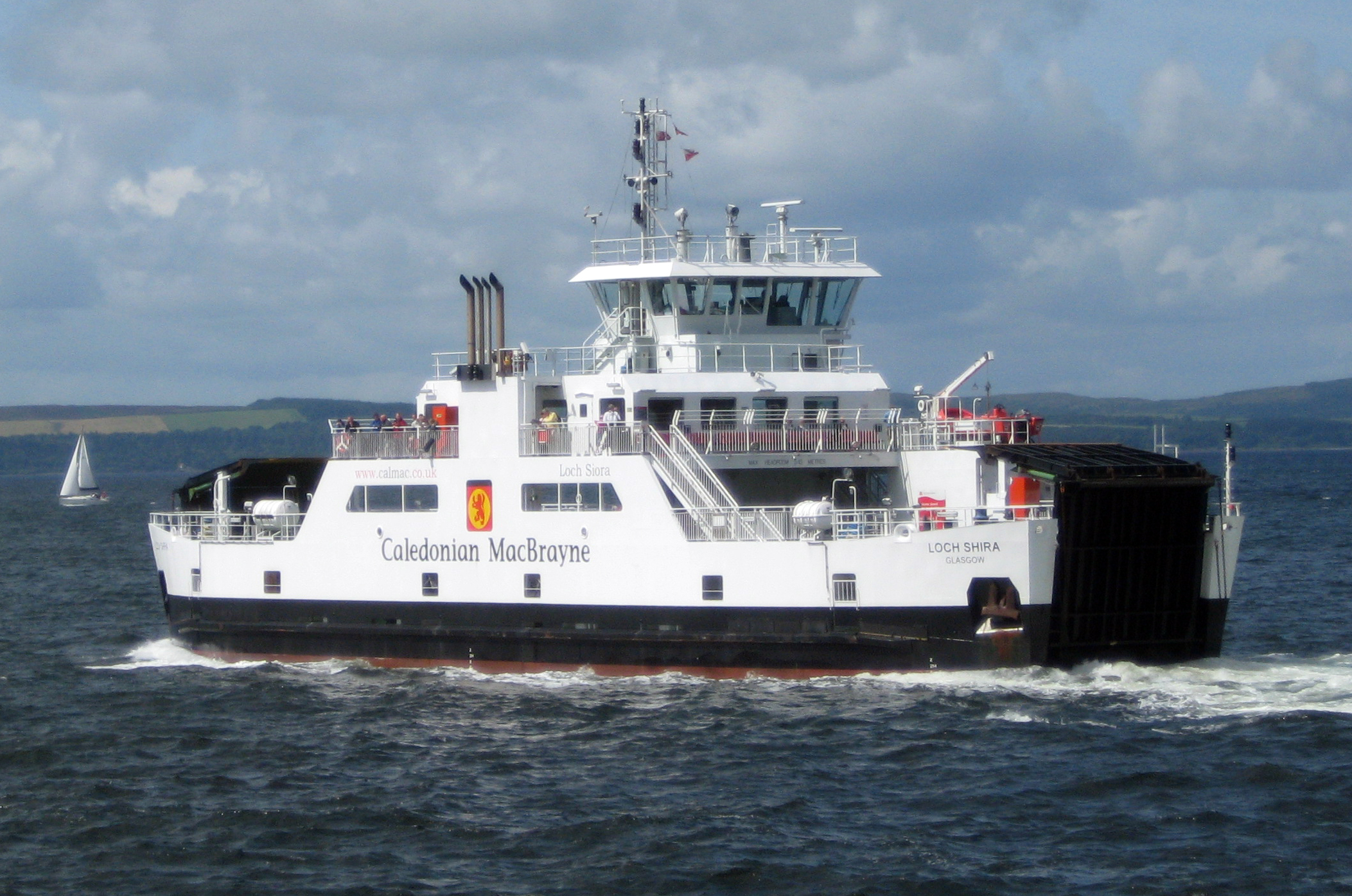
Loch Shira departing Largs

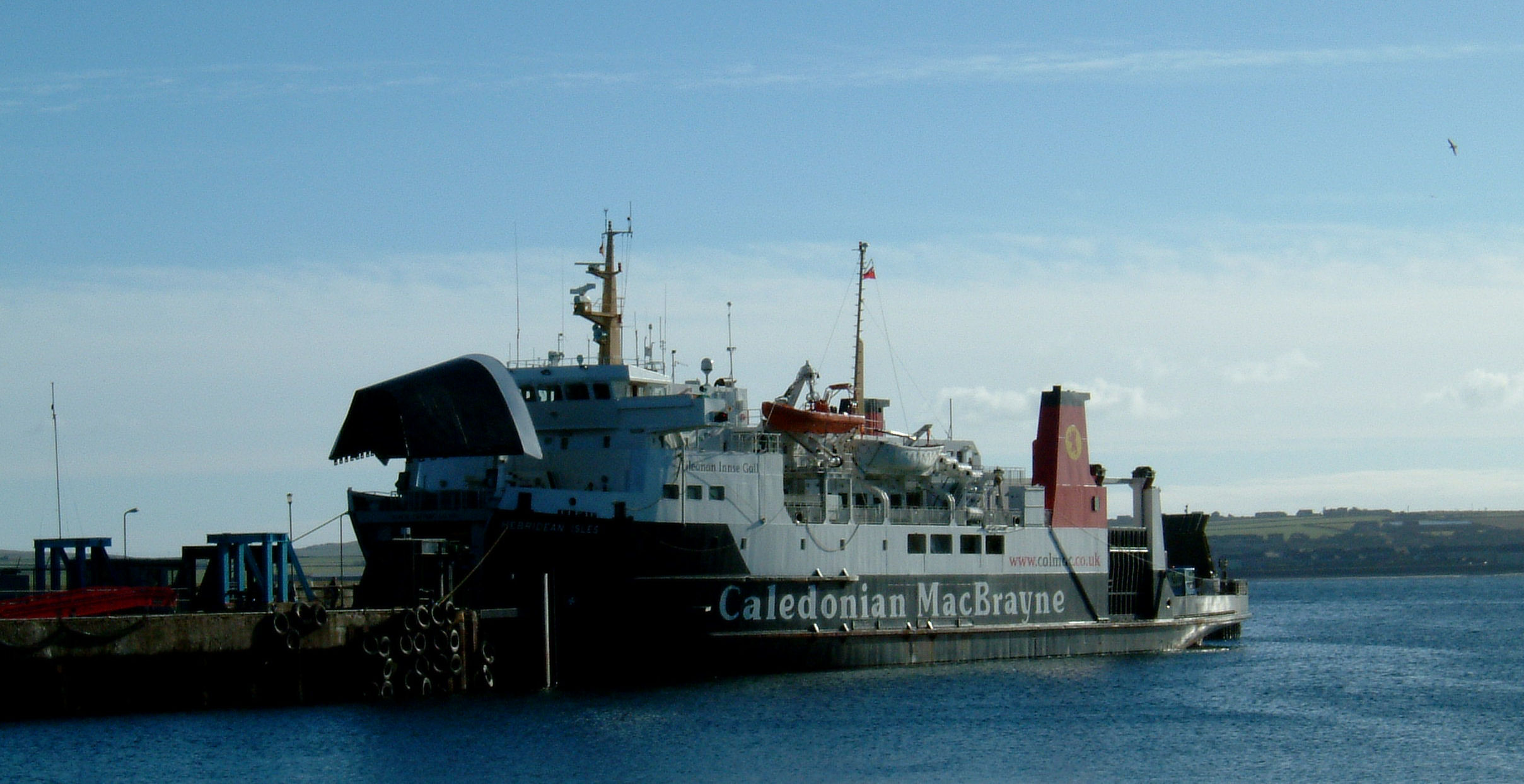
MV Hebridean Isles at Scrabster

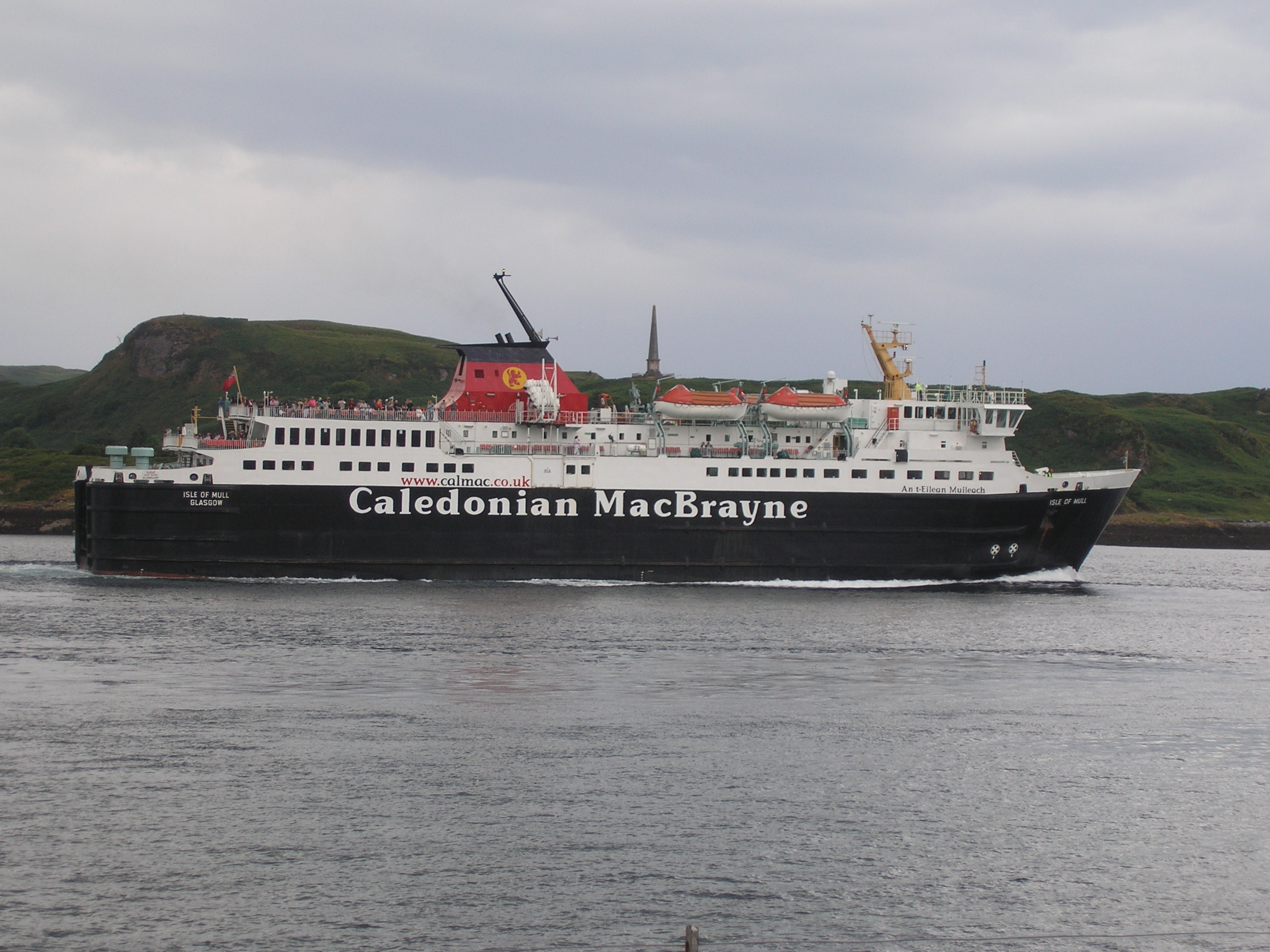
MV Isle of Mull leaving Oban harbour with Kerrera in the background

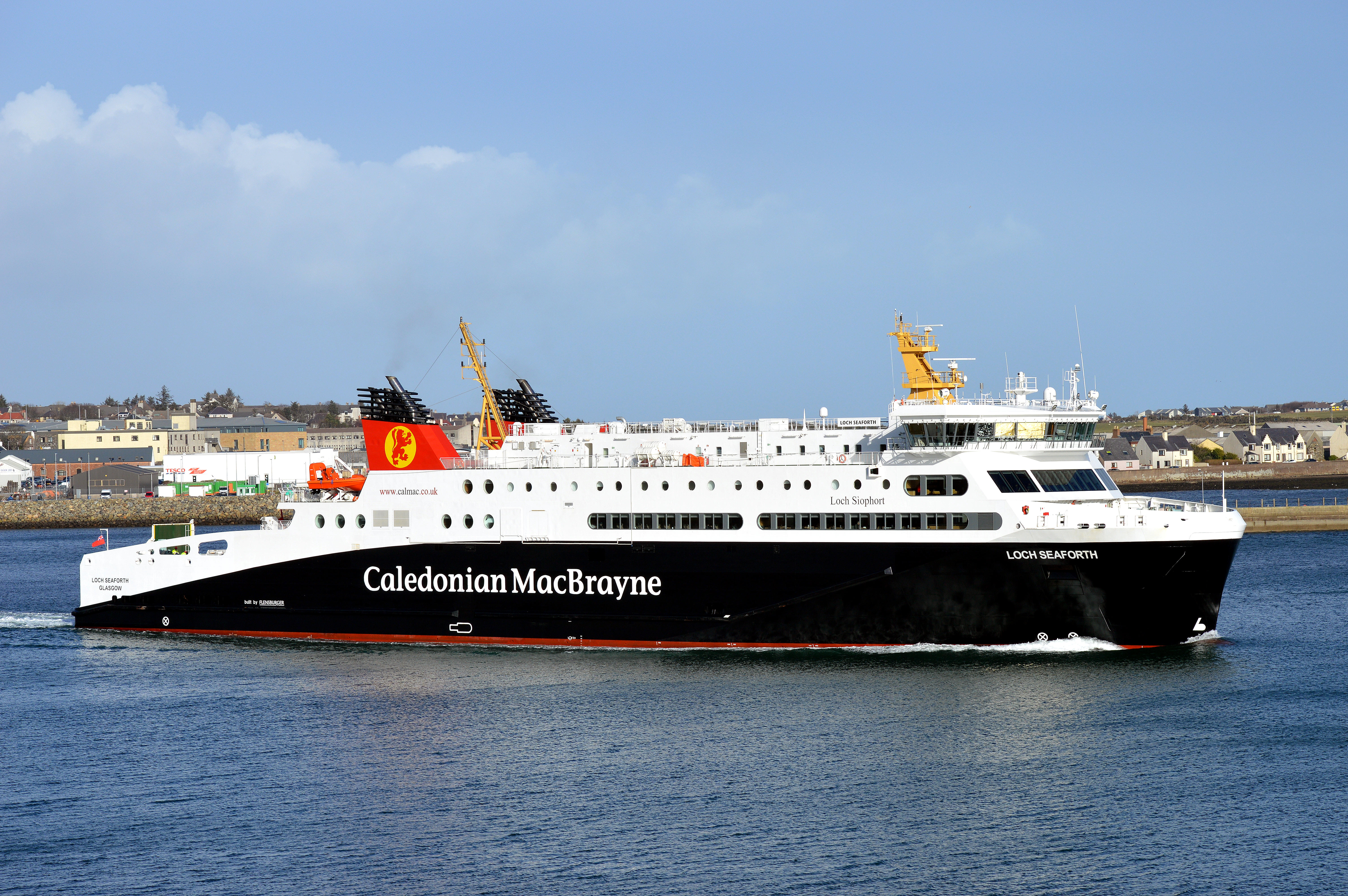
Loch Seaforth departing Stornoway

=== Routes ===
Mainland or inner port	Island or outer port	Crossing	Voyage time	Regular vessel(s)
Portavadie (Cowal Peninsula)	Tarbert (Kintyre Peninsula)	Loch Fyne	25 minutes	MV Isle of Cumbrae (summer)
Gourock	Dunoon (Cowal Peninsula)	Firth of Clyde	25 minutes	MV Argyll Flyer; MV Ali Cat
Gourock	Kilcreggan	Firth of Clyde	13 minutes	MV Chieftain
Wemyss Bay	Rothesay (Isle of Bute)	Firth of Clyde	35 minutes	MV Argyle; MV Bute; MV Coruisk (relief)
Gourock (adverse weather conditions)	Rothesay (Isle of Bute)	Firth of Clyde	1 hour	MV Argyle; MV Bute; MV Coruisk (relief)
Colintraive, Cowal	Rhubodach (Isle of Bute)	Kyles of Bute	5 minutes	MV Loch Dunvegan
Largs	Cumbrae Slip (Isle of Cumbrae)	Firth of Clyde	10 minutes	MV Loch Shira; MV Loch Tarbert (summer)
Ardrossan	Brodick (Isle of Arran)	Firth of Clyde	55 minutes	MV Caledonian Isles
Troon	Brodick (Isle of Arran)	Firth of Clyde	1 hour 15 min– 1 hour 20 min	MV Alfred; MV Glen Sannox
Claonaig (Kintyre Peninsula)	Lochranza (Isle of Arran)	Kilbrannan Sound	30 minutes	MV Catriona
Tarbert (Kintyre Peninsula) (winter and adverse weather conditions)	Lochranza (Isle of Arran)	Loch Fyne / Kilbrannan Sound	1 hour 30 min	MV Catriona
Tayinloan (Kintyre Peninsula)	Ardminish (Isle of Gigha)	Sound of Gigha	20 minutes	MV Loch Ranza
Kennacraig (Kintyre Peninsula)	Port Ellen (Isle of Islay)	via West Loch Tarbert, Argyll	2 hours 10 mins– 2 hours 20 mins	MV Isle of Islay; MV Finlaggan
Kennacraig	Port Askaig (Isle of Islay)	Sound of Islay	1 hour 55 mins– 2 hours 5 mins	MV Isle of Islay; MV Finlaggan
Port Askaig	Scalasaig (Isle of Colonsay}	Sound of Islay	1 hour	MV Isle of Islay; MV Finlaggan
Oban	Scalasaig (Isle of Colonsay}	Sound of Kerrera / Firth of Lorne	2 hours 15 mins– 2 hours 40 mins	MV Clansman; MV Isle of Islay; MV Finlaggan; MV Isle of Mull (winter only)
Oban	Craignure (Isle of Mull)	Firth of Lorne	50 minutes – 1 hour	MV Isle of Mull; MV Loch Frisa; MV Coruisk (relief)
Oban	Achnacroish (Isle of Lismore)	Lynn of Lorn	55 minutes	MV Loch Striven
Oban	Arinagour (Isle of Coll)	Sound of Mull / Sea of the Hebrides	2 hours 40 minutes	MV Clansman
Arinagour (Isle of Coll)	Scarinish (Isle of Tiree)	Sea of the Hebrides	55 minutes	MV Clansman
Oban	Scarinish (Isle of Tiree)	Sound of Mull / Sea of the Hebrides	3 hours 20 minutes	MV Clansman
Scarinish (Isle of Tiree) (summer only service)	Castlebay (Isle of Barra)	Gunna Sound / Sea of the Hebrides	2 hours 45 minutes	MV Clansman
Oban	Castlebay (Isle of Barra)	Sound of Mull / Sea of the Hebrides	4 hours 45 minutes	MV Isle of Lewis
Oban (winter only service)	Lochboisdale, South Uist	Sound of Mull / Sea of the Hebrides	5 hours 30 minutes	MV Lord of the Isles
Gallanach (near Oban)	Balliemore (Isle of Kerrera)	Sound of Kerrera	5 minutes	MV Carvoria
Lochaline (Morvern Peninsula)	Fishnish (Isle of Mull)	Sound of Mull	18 minutes	MV Lochinvar
Kilchoan (Ardnamurchan Peninsula)	Tobermory (Isle of Mull)	Sound of Mull	35 minutes	MV Loch Riddon
Fionnphort (Ross of Mull)	Isle of Iona	Sound of Iona	10 minutes	MV Loch Buie
Mallaig	Armadale (Isle of Skye)	Sound of Sleat	30 – 45 minutes Varies depending on vessel	MV Coruisk (summer); MV Loch Bhrusda (summer); MV Lochnevis (winter)
Mallaig	Small Isles (Eigg, Muck, Rùm & Canna)	Small Isles	Varies	MV Lochnevis; MV Loch Bhrusda (summer)
Mallaig	Lochboisdale (Isle of South Uist)	Sea of the Hebrides	3 hours 30 minutes	MV Lord of the Isles
Sconser (Isle of Skye	Isle of Raasay	Narrows of Raasay	25 minutes	MV Hallaig
Ardmhor (Isle of Barra)	Isle of Eriskay (connected to South Uist by causeway)	Sound of Barra	40 minutes	MV Loch Alainn
Uig (Isle of Skye)	Lochmaddy (Isle of North Uist)	Little Minch	1 hour 45 minutes	MV Hebrides
Uig (Isle of Skye)	Tarbert (Isle of Harris)	Little Minch	1 hour 40 min direct 4 hours via Lochmaddy	MV Hebrides
Leverburgh (Isle of Harris)	Isle of Berneray (connected to North Uist by causeway)	Sound of Harris	1 hour	MV Loch Portain
Ullapool (Wester Ross)	Stornoway (Isle of Lewis)	The Minch	2 hours 40 minutes	MV Loch Seaforth

=== Passenger numbers ===
Passenger numbers 2022-25
Route Name	Passengers				Cars				Coaches				Commercial Vehicles			
Route Name	2025	2024	2023	2022	2025	2024	2023	2022	2025	2024	2023	2022	2025	2024	2023	2022
Ardmhor (Barra) - Eriskay	55,847	58,363	64,761	61,469	24,303	25,707	26,944	24,507	49	99	108	127	1,124	913	1,074	905
Ardrossan - Brodick	689,485	658,714	724,706	692,518	200,946	172,646	183,597	183,092	332	444	427	448	9,356	8,609	8,608	8,711
Ardrossan - Campbeltown (Note: Service was suspended during the 2023 - 2025 seasons)	-	-	-	8,869	-	-	-	2,691	-	-	-	2	-	-	-	14
Berneray - Leverburgh	73,172	68,466	62,852	63,974	33,354	30,240	27,408	28,257	158	108	188	204	1,254	1,256	1,312	1,432
Claonaig - Lochranza (Note: For 2022 this figure also includes crossings on the winter-only Tarbert - Lochranza service)	78,713	84,433	79,182	76,351	32,828	33,764	31,032	29,225	55	114	132	159	1,059	1,418	949	857
Colintraive - Rhubodach	181,267	181,770	168,264	175,772	83,293	84,071	76,712	80,557	613	572	441	365	6,736	6,820	6,479	7,162
Fionnphort - Iona	226,839	221,252	206,038	204,623	10,052	7,891	8,021	8,471	7	1	10	2	626	518	531	601
Fishnish - Lochaline	148,671	131,463	113,541	125,759	68,653	60,293	53,864	56,544	377	428	352	445	4,252	3,765	2,829	3,107
Gallanach - Kerrera	47,009	40,072	67,290	64,009	2,064	1,723	2,592	2,230	-	-	-	-	156	4	11	0
Gourock - Dunoon (Note: Passenger-only service)	180,392	215,990	203,270	196,086	-	-	-	-	-	-	-	-	-	-	-	-
Gourock - Kilcreggan	50,970	49,494	48,609	47,659	-	-	-	-	-	-	-	-	-	-	-	-
Kennacraig - Islay	202,155	199,397	208,556	202,290	72,777	71,208	75,000	75,476	321	328	357	355	12,264	13,022	13,741	13,930
Kennacraig - Islay/Colonsay/Oban	12,431	10,839	17,125	18,216	4,232	3,904	6,176	6,659	5	11	10	20	457	611	693	694
Largs - Cumbrae Slip	725,442	712,555	721,798	690,152	198,461	196,551	199,180	185,052	658	825	938	948	3,648	5,841	4,118	3,639
Mallaig - Armadale	204,534	228,216	237,815	212,847	52,766	59,537	62,650	57,679	1,679	1,865	1,766	1,390	19	54	57	45
Mallaig - Eigg/Muck/Rum/Canna	24,511	24,678	23,496	22,376	2,111	2,100	3,038	3,223	0	2	0	0	249	254	165	173
Mallaig - Lochboisdale	20,756	26,040	26,527	31,247	9,187	11,319	10,824	12,668	20	18	29	35	187	266	282	260
Oban - Castlebay/Lochboisdale	57,828	50,145	50,258	46,261	23,051	19,658	20,116	18,433	20	19	27	19	1,506	1,146	1,350	1,099
Oban - Coll/Tiree	63,464	61,694	60,711	55,783	22,365	22,142	21,590	20,094	23	32	6	6	2,039	2,137	1,958	1,813
Oban - Coll/Tiree/Castlebay (Note: Due to the introduction of a new booking system, figures for this service are included with Oban - Coll/Tiree from 2023 onwards)	-	-	-	5,072	-	-	-	2,017	-	-	-	1	-	-	-	229
Oban - Colonsay	13,309	13,186	12,888	12,664	5,798	5,944	5,218	5,422	7	7	2	2	178	528	288	341
Oban - Craignure	549,001	558,728	553,928	550,517	144,671	153,776	150,929	156,353	1,170	1,504	1,565	1,427	6,151	6,239	5,926	6,299
Oban - Lismore	27,582	25,193	24,721	24,807	8,704	8,572	8,688	8,245	2	12	19	40	297	345	375	236
Sconser - Raasay	98,946	93,682	87,748	83,730	34,512	32,633	32,804	30,990	26	39	32	29	819	874	676	503
Tarbert - Lochranza (Note: Winter-only service. For 2022 the figures for this service were included as part of the Claonaig - Lochranza service)	1,970	1,708	1,095	-	975	841	575	-	1	0	0	-	140	102	67	-
Tarbert - Portavadie	73,710	67,529	78,259	86,372	26,838	23,185	26,975	29,902	4	9	40	15	203	161	145	217
Tayinloan - Gigha	70,335	71,967	69,709	70,511	23,656	23,503	23,281	23,754	5	5	23	22	914	1,098	1,116	1,149
Tobermory - Kilchoan	41,771	44,522	45,437	44,361	11,197	11,512	11,494	11,360	1	11	15	11	33	21	9	22
Uig - Tarbert/Lochmaddy	182,406	181,745	163,244	155,440	76,622	75,269	66,471	65,369	305	311	355	338	5,229	5,282	5,129	5,239
Ullapool - Stornoway	296,214	290,671	300,525	285,384	106,030	101,953	111,542	104,449	541	515	536	540	13,322	13,197	13,615	13,314
Wemyss Bay - Rothesay	687,623	688,190	657,123	613,117	202,324	207,471	203,872	190,541	694	500	365	416	8,959	8,360	7,458	8,332

=== Monopoly ===
The company enjoys a de facto monopoly on the shipment of freight and vehicles to the islands, and competes for passenger traffic with a number of aircraft services of varying quality and reliability. Nonetheless, few if any of the routes currently operated by CalMac are profitable, and the company receives significant government subsidies due to its vital role in supplying the islands: these routes are classified as "lifeline" services.

Various versions of a local poem (based loosely on Psalm 24) refer to MacBrayne's long dominance of Hebridean sailings:

The Earth belongs unto the Lord
And all that it contains
Except the Kyles and the Western Isles
And they are all MacBrayne's

== Fleet ==
34 of the vessels operated by CalMac are owned by the asset holding company CMAL. Two ferries, MV Ali Cat and MV Argyll Flyer, are directly owned by CalMac, and a further two, MV Alfred and MV Chieftain, are on charter from other owners.

Twelve of the vessels can be categorised as "major units" – ships of 80 m (262 ft) or more in length. The largest is MV Loch Seaforth at 116 m (381 ft) in length. The newest vessel in current service, MV Isle of Islay, entered service on the Islay route on 31 March 2026; her sister ship MV Loch Indaal joined the fleet on 18 November 2026, but is yet to sail to Scotland. The remaining major vessels are MV Glen Sannox, MV Isle of Lewis, MV Clansman, MV Hebrides, MV Caledonian Isles, MV Isle of Mull, MV Isle of Arran (currently the relief ferry), MV Finlaggan, and MV Lord of the Isles.

There are 13 "Loch Class" vessels in different shapes and sizes. These double-ended ferries are mostly symmetrical when viewed from the side, with no operational bow or stern (although in official documents the designation of such is given). They generally serve shorter, more sheltered routes, although MV Loch Portain is able to handle Force 8 gales and carry 31 cars and 195 passengers, with a crew of five. MV Loch Shira, sometimes referred to as a "super loch", entered service in 2007 on the Largs–Cumbrae route. MV Loch Fyne & MV Loch Linnhe are spare and relief vessels and are not assigned to any specific route. Similar in outward appearance to the Loch Class vessels are the three diesel-electric ferries built by Ferguson Marine Engineering: MV Hallaig (2013; for Raasay), MV Lochinvar (2013; for Tarbert, later Lochaline) and MV Catriona (2015; for Lochranza).

A number of vessels have specific features and are designed for specific crossings. MV Lochnevis (2000) was designed for the Small Isles service, being fitted with a large stern vehicle ramp that allows her to berth a considerable distance from a slipway, protecting her exposed Azimuth thrusters in shallow waters. MV Bute (2005) and MV Argyle (2007), both built in Gdańsk, work solely on the busy Wemyss Bay–Rothesay route. In 2022, a Norwegian ferry was purchased for the Mull service; after modification it entered service as MV Loch Frisa. MV Alfred is a catamaran ferry owned by Pentland Ferries, currently on charter to CalMac for the Arran service. The smallest vessel in the fleet is MV Carvoria, built in Shetland for the Kerrera route.

There are three passenger-only vessels in the fleet: MV Ali Cat, MV Argyll Flyer and MV Chieftain. All operate on the Clyde. MV Chieftain is leased from Clyde Marine Services for the Gourock to Kilcreggan service, whilst MV Ali Cat and MV Argyll Flyer operate the Gourock-Dunoon service.

=== Future fleet ===
The second of two dual fuel ferries for Arran constructed by Ferguson Marine Engineering, MV Glen Rosa (sister vessel to Glen Sannox), is expected no earlier than February 2027.

Two vessels of the same design as Isle of Islay and Loch Indaal are under construction at Cemre Shipyard in Turkey. These two vessels are to be named MV Claymore and MV Lochmor. On 26 June 2026, it was announced that CMAL had taken full legal ownership of these vessels, despite them being unfinished. CMAL described this action as a "precautionary measure" due to potential economic challenges at the Cemre shipyard, which was taken to ensure that were the shipyard to go out of business the ferries could be completed elsewhere. Delivery, originally planned for 2025, has been delayed by approximately 18 months, and as of September 2026, it was expected that Lochmor would be delivered in the first quarter of 2027, with Claymore following in the second quarter. The Cemre the shipyard blamed the impact of the war in Ukraine on steel supplies, Houthi attacks on vessels in the Red Sea, the 2023 Turkey–Syria earthquakes, a shortage of commissioning engineers, and snow and cold weather in Turkey. Total costs for all four vessels have risen by approximately £20M.

In March 2025 a contract was awarded to Remontowa Shipbuilding of Gdańsk in Poland for construction of seven vessels to replace of the oldest of the Loch class vessels. These are electric ferries, though may require to be run on diesel until shore power can be fully set up, with the first vessel expected in 2027. The seven vessels are to be named MV Loch Awe, MV Loch Etive, MV Loch Katrine, MV Loch Maree, MV Loch Morar, MV Loch Rannoch, and MV Loch Shiel. As of August 2026, construction was underway for five of the seven vessels.

== See also ==
- Transport Scotland
- Caledonian Maritime Assets
- David MacBrayne
- Argyll Ferries
