= Craignure railway station =

Railway station in Argyll and Bute, Scotland

Coordinates: 56°28′11″N 5°41′48″W

Craignure was a station on the Isle of Mull, Argyll and Bute, Scotland, on the Isle of Mull Railway line.

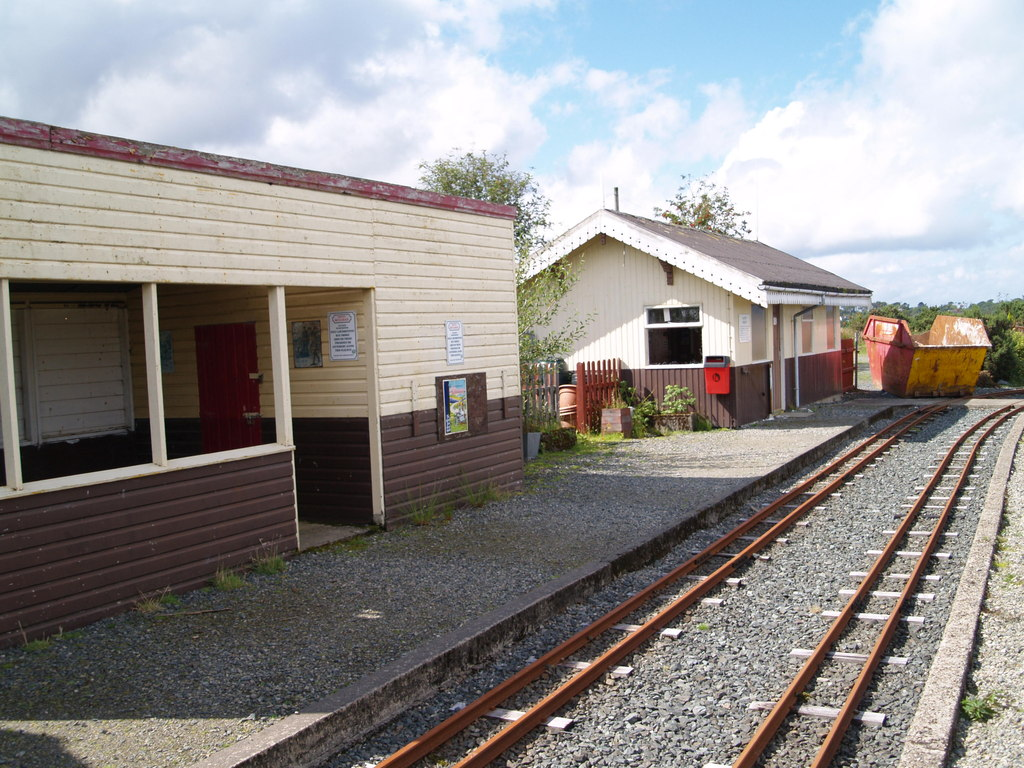

Preceding station	Heritage railways	Following station
Historical railways
Terminus	Isle of Mull Railway	Torosay Terminus
