= Sound of Gigha =

Coordinates: 55.68°N 5.70°W

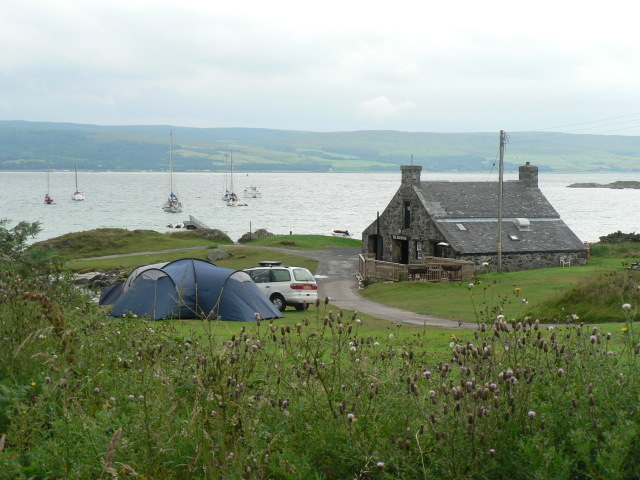
Sound of Gigha

The Sound of Gigha is a sound between the Inner Hebridean Isle of Gigha and Kintyre. It forms part of the Atlantic Ocean.
