= Craignure =

Ferry port on Isle of Mull, Scotland

Coordinates: 56.471°N 5.707°W

Craignure: Scottish Gaelic: Creag an Iubhair
- Village
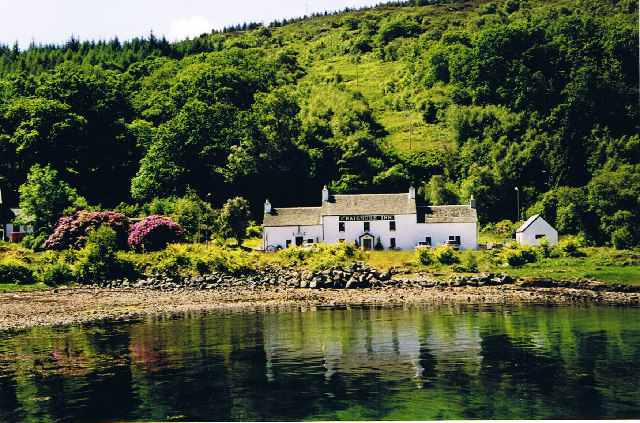
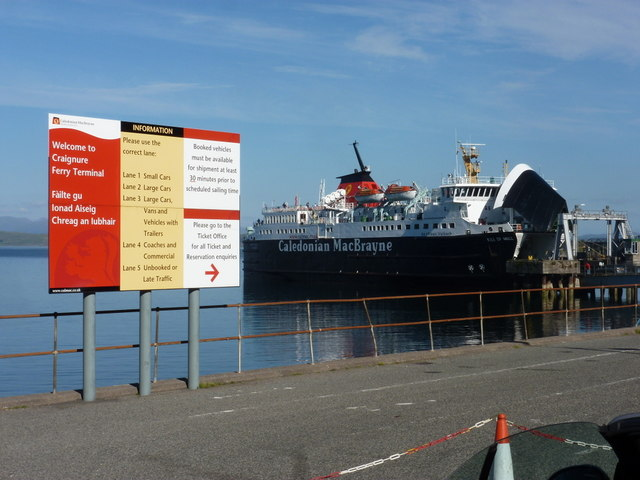
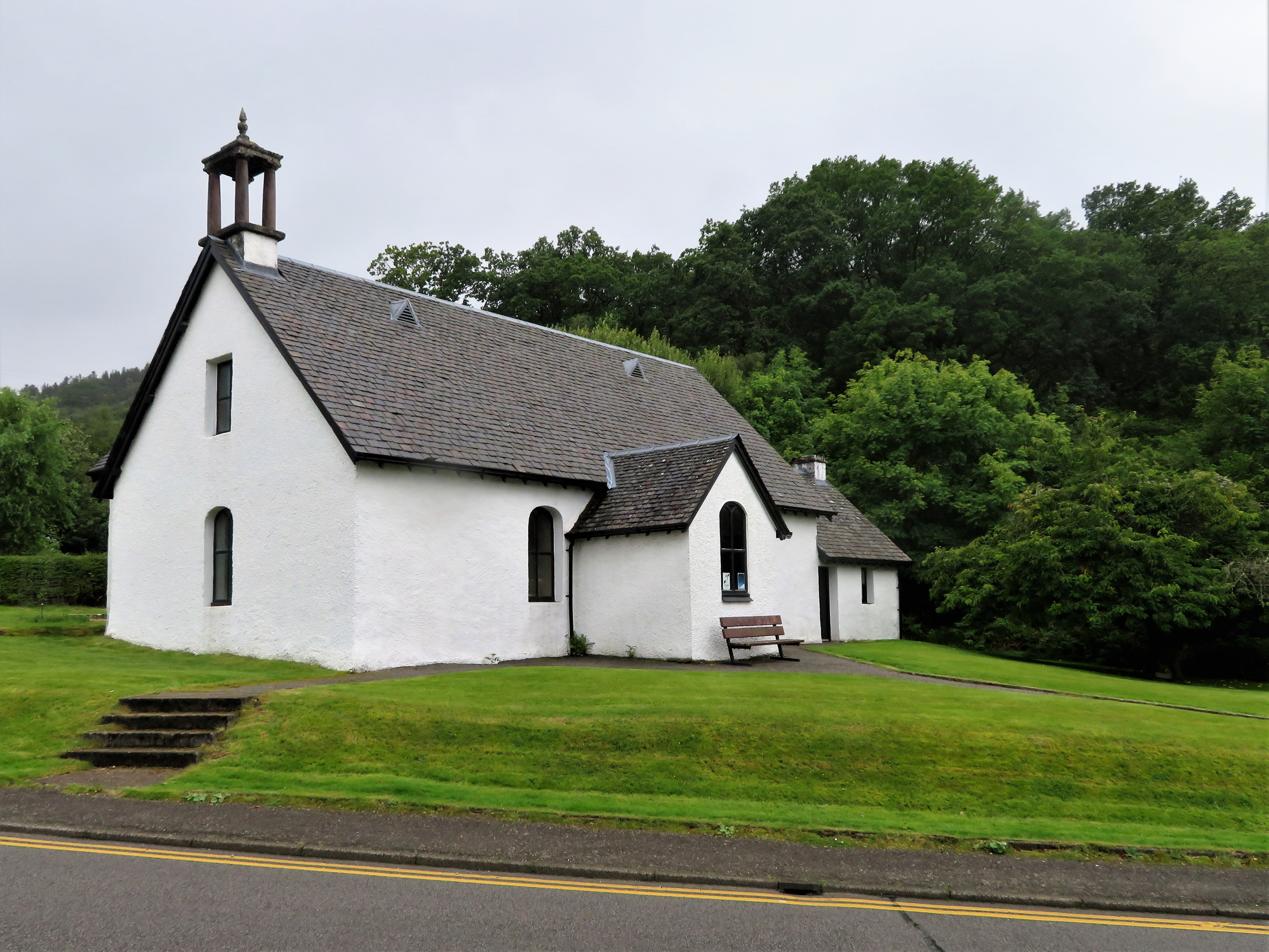
- The Inn from across the water Craignure ferry terminal Craignure Kirk

- Location within Argyll and Bute
- Population: 200 (approx.)
- OS grid reference: NM717371
- Civil parish: Torosay
- Council area: Argyll and Bute
- Lieutenancy area: Argyll and Bute
- Country: Scotland
- Sovereign state: United Kingdom
- Post town: ISLE OF MULL
- Postcode district: PA65
- Dialling code: 01680
- Police: Scotland
- Fire: Scottish
- Ambulance: Scottish
- UK Parliament: Argyll, Bute and South Lochaber
- Scottish Parliament: Argyll and Bute

Craignure (Note: /kreɪɡˈnjʊər/; Scottish Gaelic: Creag an Iubhair) is a village and the main ferry port on the Isle of Mull, Argyll and Bute, Scotland. The village is within the parish of Torosay.

== Geography ==
The village is located around Craignure Bay, on Mull's east coast. It has a population of roughly 200 people. Close to the village are two castles: Torosay and Duart.

== Transport ==
=== Ferry ===
A regular ferry service connects Craignure with mainland Scotland via the Sound of Mull. The original pier, on the south side of the bay, was built in 1894. The present pier, on the west side of the bay, was built in 1964. Ferries run every two hours (3 to 5 times per day during the winter, & up to 10 times per day during the summer) between Craignure and Oban (on the mainland) by CalMac.

Preceding station	Caledonian MacBrayne	Following station
Terminus	Mull ferry	Oban Terminus

=== Road ===
Craignure is situated on the A849, an indirect route between Salen and Fionnphort. The village is served by buses to Fionnphort and Tobermory.

=== Railway ===
Craignure railway station was on the now closed narrow gauge Isle of Mull Railway.

== See also ==
- List of places in Argyll and Bute
