= MV Hebrides =

Scottish ferry

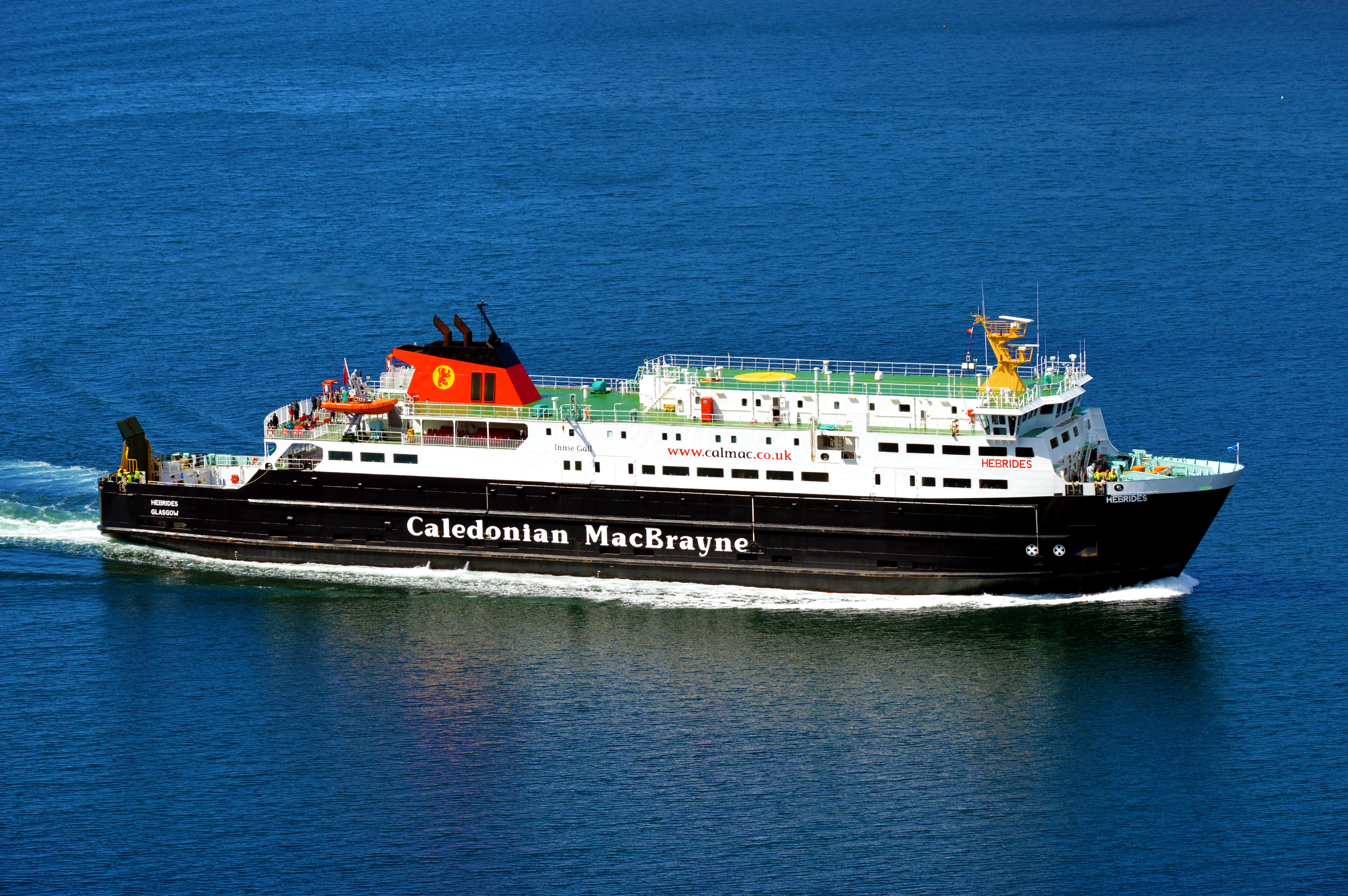
- On approach towards Uig in May 2015

History

United Kingdom
- Name: MV Hebrides (III); Scottish Gaelic: Innse Gall
- Owner: Caledonian Maritime Assets
- Operator: Caledonian MacBrayne
- Port of registry: Glasgow
- Route: Uig - Tarbert/Lochmaddy
- Builder: Ferguson Shipbuilders, Port Glasgow
- Cost: £15,000,000
- Yard number: 708
- Launched: 2 August 2000
- Maiden voyage: 24 March 2001
- Identification: IMO number: 9211975; Callsign: ZQYC3; MMSI Number: 235000864
- Status: In service

General characteristics
- Tonnage: 5,506 gt
- Length: 99 m (325 ft)
- Beam: 15.8 m (51 ft 10 in)
- Draught: 3.22 m (10 ft 7 in)
- Propulsion: 2 × MAK 8 M32, Gear Box: 2 × Ulstein 1500 AGSC; Bow Thruster: 2 × Electric Ulstein 90TV, each thrust 7.0 tf (69 kN) thrust
- Speed: 16.5 kn (31 km/h) (service)
- Capacity: 612 passengers, 90 cars
- Crew: 34

MV Hebrides (Scottish Gaelic: Innse Gall) is an inter-island ferry operating in Scotland, owned by Caledonian Maritime Assets and operated by its subsidiary Caledonian MacBrayne. She entered service in the Hebrides in 2001, operating on the "Uig Triangle" from Uig on the Isle of Skye to Lochmaddy and Tarbert, the main settlements of North Uist and Harris respectively. She has spent most of her career operating on the Uig Triangle, with occasional stints relieving other vessels on different routes. She is the third vessel to bear the name of the islands she serves.

== History ==
MV Hebrides revived a traditional name on the "Uig Triangle" and is the third vessel in the fleets of Caledonian MacBrayne (CalMac) and its predecessors to have borne the name in a span of 130 years. She carries the bell of the first Hebrides (an 1898 steamer that operated into the 1950s) that was also carried by the second Hebrides (1964-85). The second "Heb" was CalMac's first car ferry, that for twenty years also sailed from Uig, Skye.

Following sea trials on the River Clyde in early 2001, Hebrides made her way round to Uig, Tarbert and Lochmaddy, conducting berthing trials at the three linkspans. Uig and Tarbert piers had to be extended to accommodate the new, larger vessel. On entry into service on 24 March 2001 she initially displaced MV Hebridean Isles on services to Islay. Her service speed is 16.5 knots (30.6 km/h; 19.0 mph), which cut the crossing times to around 100 minutes and allowed three return trips per day. There were no Sunday sailings to or from Tarbert, so Hebrides concentrated on serving Lochmaddy on North Uist. The ratio of crossings was approximately 2:1 in favour of North Uist. Having MV Isle of Lewis at Stornoway (serving Lewis and Harris), and in 2003 the introduction of the new MV Loch Portain (making inter-island access easier) encouraged this trend.

Hebrides was due to be replaced on the Uig Triangle by MV Glen Rosa, one of two dual-fuel vessels being built at Ferguson Marine shipyard in Port Glasgow on the River Clyde. Amidst prolonged delays to this vessel however, Calmac's parent Caledonian Maritime Assets instead decided to order two new vessels of a similar design to MV Isle of Islay and MV Loch Indaal. These ferries, named MV Claymore and MV Lochmor, are currently under construction at Cemre Shipyard in Turkey, and are expected to be delivered during 2026. Following this, it was reported that Hebrides was to be re-deployed on the Oban-Coll/Tiree/Colonsay crossings. On 25 September 2026, CalMac published a revised Vessel Deployment, Disposal and Cascade Plan, indicating that when MV Claymore enters service, Hebrides would be re-deployed to serve Arran in the summer and Barra in the winter.

== Layout ==
MV Hebrides' design is very similar to that of the MV Clansman of 1998. There is an increased amount of open deck space, the majority of it being covered. She was the first vessel of the fleet to be equipped with a Marine Evacuation System of inflatable chutes leading to large liferafts in place of conventional lifeboats. Following simulations and the success of the Clansman’s design, her hull incorporates fewer gaps for water to escape from the car deck.

The Hebrides loads vehicles via a stern ramp at Uig and through the bow at the two Outer Isles ports. Like the Clansman, there is an open stern, allowing her to carry hazardous goods whilst still carrying foot passengers. The car deck has room for approximately 80 cars. A mezzanine deck on the starboard side can be raised or lowered to allow loading of eighteen more cars.

The entrance lobby has the shop and information desk. Forward are a lounge and Mariners Cafeteria at the bow. Aft is the Chieftain Bar and open deck area. On the deck above are an observation lounge at the bow, crew accommodation and further open deck.

== Service ==
MV Hebrides is normally found sailing from Uig on Skye to Tarbert and Lochmaddy, and rarely sailed anywhere else in her early service life. One notable exception was during closure of the Uig linkspan, when she sailed from Ullapool for a week or so. At the time she was in company with Clansman which was relieving on the Ullapool crossing. Similarly, when the linkspan at Lochmaddy was closed for repairs, Hebrides used the facilities at Lochboisdale in South Uist. During the spring of 2007 the ship was converted to burn oil, and was trialled on the Oban to Coll, Tiree and Barra and South Uist services. Her sister, Clansman, soon returned, and Hebrides spent another five years never deviating from her route except for her annual overhaul, which was usually done either at Greenock, Aberdeen, Leith or Birkenhead.

In August 2012, CalMac announced that Hebrides was to be the main relief vessel for the next winter, a role which had usually been assigned to her sister Clansman. The Islay ferry Finlaggan was chosen as Hebrides' replacement at Uig, Lochmaddy and Tarbert from 1 December. In December 2012, Hebrides relieved Isle of Mull on the Oban to Craignure and Colonsay services, as well as running extra services to Coll, Tiree, Barra and South Uist over the festive season. In January 2013, Hebrides relieved Caledonian Isles on the Ardrossan to Brodick service, and in February relieved Isle of Lewis on the Ullapool to Stornoway service. Hebrides then relieved Clansman on the Outer Isles services in March, before finally returning to the Uig-Lochmaddy-Tarbert triangle after her own overhaul, before the summer timetable started in March 2013. In October 2013, she made an unexpected return to Stornoway to relieve the broken-down Isle of Lewis, which went into dry dock for propeller shaft problems. In July 2015, this situation was reversed, when Hebrides suffered a breakdown leading to her visiting Stornoway for repairs for two days, with Isle of Lewis taking over her Uig, Lochmaddy and Tarbert triangle until she was repaired.

Hebrides became a relief vessel for January and February 2016, with her regular duties being covered by Hebridean Isles and MV Isle of Arran.

Hebrides was granted special dispensation by the Maritime and Coastguard Agency to continue operating after her annually-issued Passenger Safety Certificate expired in 2018. Her annual overhaul had been delayed while she deputised for Clansman, whose propulsion system had been damaged on entering dry dock. In September 2018, Hebrides operated to Stornoway whilst the pier at Tarbert was occupied by the damaged Norwegian freighter Fame.

== Incidents ==
=== 2016 grounding ===
Hebrides collided with pontoons and then ran aground at Lochmaddy on 25 September 2016, after apparently suffering engine difficulties. It was reported that the vessel became "stuck in forward gear" and "remained in gear" after running aground. The vessel later managed to dock and disembark the passengers and vehicles aboard. CalMac reported that the hull was intact and that divers were en route to inspect the damage. Following inspection, Hebrides was moved to Greenock for dry docking and repairs. Meanwhile Clansman was transferred to Uig to take over the route, with Isle of Lewis providing an additional sailing from Lochmaddy to Uig to clear the backlog of traffic. The repairs to Hebrides were completed by 14 October 2016 and she returned to service on 17 October. The subsequent investigation by the United Kingdom Marine Accident Investigation Branch determined that the actuator for the left controllable-pitch propeller mechanism had become disconnected from the mechanism due to incorrect maintenance, caused by a lack of a written procedure for maintenance personnel to follow; this meant that the left propeller continued to provide forward thrust after the crew tried to command reverse thrust.

=== 2022 evacuation ===
On 21 July 2022, Hebrides was evacuated after a suspicious package was found onboard as she prepared to depart Uig for Lochmaddy. Police attended and determined that the package was not dangerous.
