= MV Hebridean Isles =

Ship built in 1985

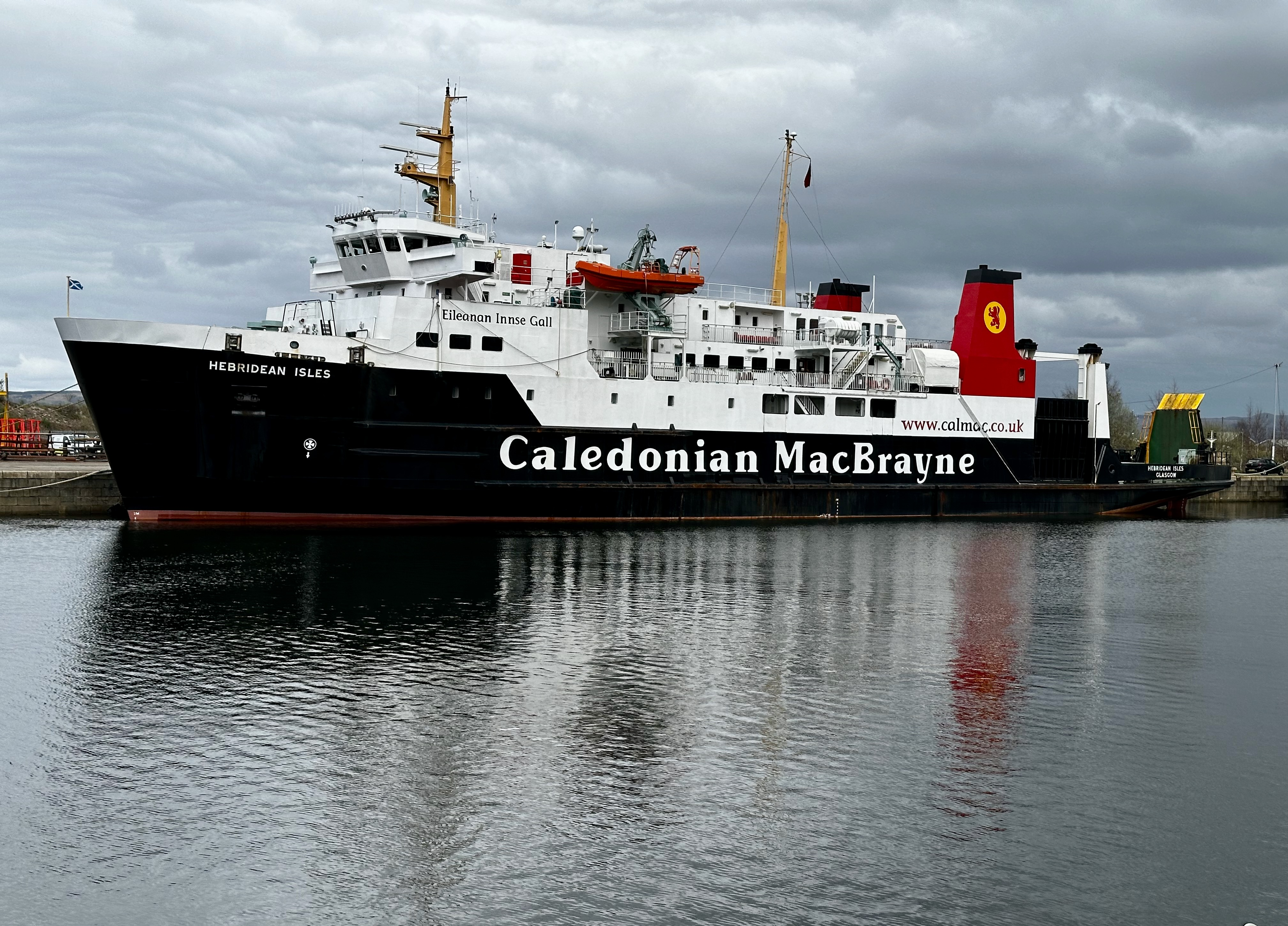
- Berthed at Dales Marine Services, James Watt Dock, Greenock (2024)

History

United Kingdom
- Name: MV Hebridean Isles; Scottish Gaelic: Eileanan Innse Gall
- Owner: Caledonian Maritime Assets
- Operator: Caledonian MacBrayne
- Route: Kennacraig–Islay
- Builder: Cochrane Shipbuilders, Selby
- Yard number: 130
- Launched: 4 July 1985; by Katharine, Duchess of Kent
- Maiden voyage: 5 December 1985
- Out of service: 17 November 2024
- Identification: IMO number: 8404812; MMSI Number: 232000420; Callsign: GFMJ
- Fate: 2025: Scrapped in Esbjerg, Denmark

General characteristics
- Tonnage: 3,040 Gross Tonnage; 912 Net Tonnage; 574 Deadweight
- Length: 85.15 m (279 ft 4 1/2 in)
- Beam: 15.80 m (51 ft 10 in) (Design) 16.31 m (53 ft 6 in) (Overall)
- Draught: 3.11 m (10 ft 2 1/2 in)
- Depth: 5.00 m (16 ft 5 in)
- Propulsion: 2x controllable pitch propellers; 1x Bow Thruster
- Speed: 15 kn (28 km/h) (service); Consumption at Service Speed: 580 Litres per hour
- Capacity: 507 passengers; 68 cars (as built); 52 cars (as of 2022); 60 cars (according to CMAL); 7 trucks
- Crew: 24; 28 (In Islay Service)

MV Hebridean Isles was a ro-ro vehicle ferry that was operated by Caledonian MacBrayne on the west coast of Scotland. She was the first MacBrayne vessel to be ordered and built for them outside Scotland and the first to be launched sideways. With bow, stern and side ramps, Hebridean Isles was suitable for all the routes served by the large fleet units. After 15 years crossing the Little Minch on the Uig triangle, she served Islay and Colonsay before being retired in November 2024, after almost 40 years of service.

== History ==
MV Hebridean Isles (nicknamed "Heb Isles" amongst crew and passengers alike) was constructed at Cochrane Shipbuilders's yard in Selby and launched sideways into the Ouse in 1985. She was the first MacBrayne vessel to be built outside Scotland, the first to be launched sideways and the first to be launched by royalty – the Duchess of Kent.

Broadly similar to the MV Isle of Arran, she was intended for the Uig triangle, but was designed to be suitable for use anywhere within the network. Following her delivery voyage, she conducted trials at various ports around the network, but did not take up duties at Uig, Skye until spring 1986. MV Columba, the winter relief ship continued there while construction works were carried out at the various piers. New linkspans were required at all three terminals, so the new ship found temporary employment as a winter relief vessel at Ullapool and Oban, where she stood in for the MV Caledonia and MV Glen Sannox. Even when she took over at Uig, she still had to use her hoist at the Skye terminal for eight months while the new berth at the end of the pier was finished.

She brought vastly improved standards of passenger comfort and became popular, with slightly reduced sailing times and, once she was able to use her bow and stern ramps, greatly reduced turnaround times.

== Layout ==
MV Hebridean Isles' design incorporated a bow visor, bow and stern ramps, and a vehicle hoist with side ramps. This made her suitable for all the routes served by the large fleet units. Her spacious car deck could accommodate 60 cars, with passenger accommodation on two decks forward of the hoist. One deck comprised the cafeteria furthest aft, then the entrance concourse, shop and information point, with the reclining lounge and bar towards the bow. The bar was converted to a Coffee Cabin in December 2008. Above the cafeteria was the observation lounge with crew accommodation forward of this. The bridge was on the next level at the bow. Externally there was ample deck space including, like MV Isle of Arran, a deck area forward of the bridge, giving passengers a view ahead.

== Service ==
MV Hebridean Isles spent her first 15 years crossing the Little Minch from Uig to Tarbert and Lochmaddy (Lochmaddy only on Sundays), using her stern ramp at Uig and her bow visor and ramp at both Tarbert and Lochmaddy. Demand eventually became too much and she was replaced by the larger MV Hebrides in 2001. Hebridean Isles headed south as the dedicated Islay ferry, taking over from MV Isle of Arran. Operating out of Kennacraig on the Kintyre peninsula, she sailed to Port Ellen and Port Askaig. During the summer season, she continued to Colonsay and Oban on Wednesdays, returning to Kennacraig in the evening. Between 2003 and 2011, she was joined by Isle of Arran in the summer, providing a series of additional sailings throughout the week and maintaining the service on Wednesdays during the Oban extension.

For six months from October 2002, she was chartered to NorthLink Ferries and inaugurated their Stromness to Scrabster service. She continued to relieve there each winter.

During June and July 2010, Hebridean Isles was redeployed on the Oban to Coll and Tiree run, replacing MV Clansman, which had suffered major engine problems. She hit the pier at Scarinish, Tiree, on the late afternoon of 29 June 2010, sustaining a hole above the waterline. Reverse pitch was selected prior to the collision but an unspecified problem prevented reverse engaging. The vessel returned to Oban for repairs and resumed the Coll and Tiree run two days after the incident.

In summer 2011, MV Finlaggan joined Hebridean Isles as the main Islay vessel, freeing up Isle of Arran as a spare vessel.

On 28 January 2014, it was announced that Hebridean Isles would temporarily take over freight services between Ullapool and Stornoway in the Western Isles, due to the freight ferry MS Clipper Ranger colliding with the pier at Stornoway.

Hebridean Isles relieved on the Uig Triangle alongside Isle of Arran in January and February 2016 whilst Hebrides was away covering for other vessels. In July 2016, she collided with the pier at Kennacraig, with her traffic being carried by Finlaggan and the cargo boat Red Princess.

In October 2016, Hebridean Isles provided a twice-nightly freight service on the Ullapool - Stornoway route whilst MV Loch Seaforth was in dry-dock.

From 3 January to 21 January 2017, Hebridean Isles relieved on the Ardrossan - Brodick crossing alongside Isle of Arran whilst MV Caledonian Isles was away for her annual overhaul. She repeated this relief service in January 2018, 2019 and 2020.

During April and May 2018, Hebridean Isles operated an Oban - Lochboisdale service whilst MV Lord of the Isles covered for MV Clansman's repair at James Watt Dock in Greenock.

In September 2018, Hebridean Isles relieved on the Ardrossan - Brodick crossing in place of MV Isle of Arran, which was out of service owing to issues with her propeller shaft. Caledonian Isles had also sustained damage to her loading ramps whilst carrying an overweight vehicle. Hebridean Isles provided additional capacity on the Ardrossan-Brodick crossing, in addition to her first ever sailing to Campbeltown due to Caledonian Isles operating with a reduced capacity. Additionally, MV Loch Linnhe provided additional sailings on the Claonaig to Lochranza crossing to help ease congestion.

After relieving at Arran in January 2019, Hebridean Isles returned in March 2019 to cover for Caledonian Isles, which had rammed the pier at Brodick and sustained damage to her bow visor as a result of her bow thrusters failing.

From January - February 2022, Hebridean Isles relieved on the Ardrossan - Brodick route. She operated the route alone (rather than alongside Isle of Arran) due to a temporary timetable caused by staff absences relating to COVID-19. She remained on the route for over a month as a result of delays to MV Caledonian Isles' return to service.

=== 2023 Breakdown disruption ===
In January 2023, Hebridean Isles was scheduled to relieve Caledonian Isles on the Ardrossan - Brodick route alongside MV Isle of Arran. However, Hebridean Isles was affected by a number of technical faults, so Isle of Arran operated the service alone. Hebridean Isles provided some freight services between Brodick and Troon before developing another fault in late February and being removed from service. The situation was further compounded by the delayed return of MV Caledonian Isles from overhaul.

Hebridean Isles remained out of service through summer 2023. She spent time laid up in Troon and Ayr, and in dry dock at Greenock and Birkenhead, where a further rudder fault was discovered during sea trials. CalMac reported pitch control issues with her controllable pitch propellers. Her absence led to disruption to the Islay, Lochboisdale, Arran and Campbeltown services. The Campbeltown route was cancelled for the full summer, with MV Isle of Arran remaining the second vessel at Islay and the chartered MV Alfred as the second vessel at Arran. On 26 August, Hebridean Isles arrived in Aberdeen for further repairs in dry dock by Dales Marine Services.

On 14 October, she returned to service between Kennacraig and Port Askaig, as part of operational trials. It was subsequently confirmed repairs had been successful and the vessel returned to service.

=== Retirement ===
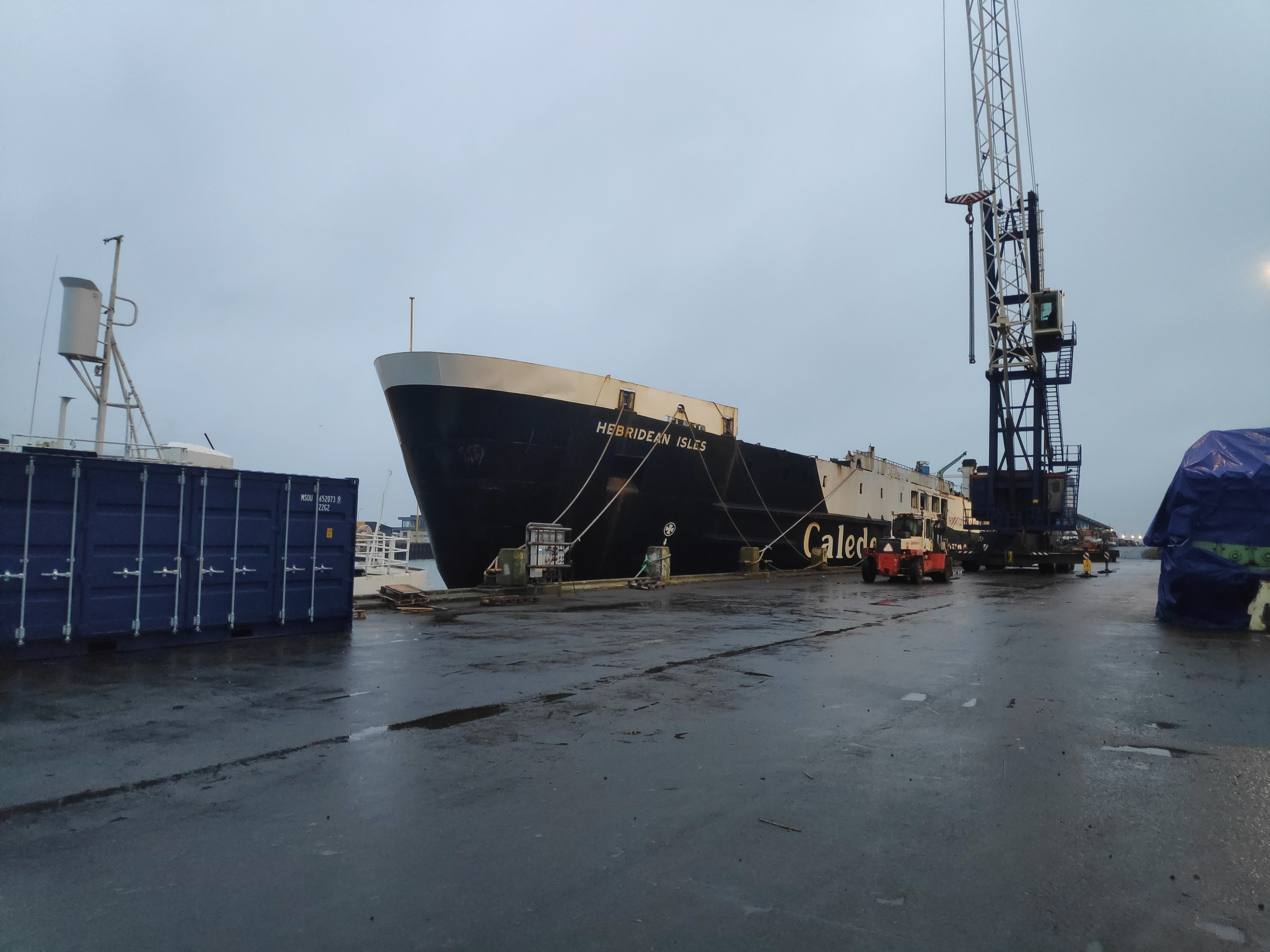
Hebridean Isles in a shipyard in Esbjerg during final dismantling

In August 2024, CalMac announced that Hebridean Isles would be retired from the fleet by 21 November 2024, due to rising maintenance costs and the imminent arrivals of MV Isle of Islay and MV Loch Indaal on the Kennacraig - Islay route. The announcement came just a day after Hebridean Isles was temporarily removed from service due to a bow thruster problem, though CalMac stressed this was not related to the retirement plans. In September 2024, Hebridean Isles moved from the Islay service to Arran, operating alongside MV Alfred. This was to allow Isle of Arran, who had in turn been relieving Caledonian Isles during her prolonged withdrawal from service, to depart for her annual overhaul. Lord of the Isles moved from South Uist to Islay to operate alongside Finlaggan.

Hebridean Isles's final days in operation consisted of providing additional freight capacity between Ullapool and Stornoway alongside MV Isle of Lewis in November 2024, whilst MV Loch Seaforth underwent annual maintenance. Upon Loch Seaforth's return to service, Hebridean Isles was withdrawn from service on 17 November 2024. She departed for Glasgow, arriving the next day at King George V Dock. The vessel remained at King George V Dock for almost a year, during which time spare parts which could be used for maintaining other vessels were removed for storage in a CalMac warehouse in Gourock. On 27 October 2025, Hebridean Isles was taken under tow to Esbjerg in Denmark for final dismantling.

== See also ==
- Caledonian MacBrayne fleet
