= MV Isle of Lewis =

CalMac ferry built in 1995

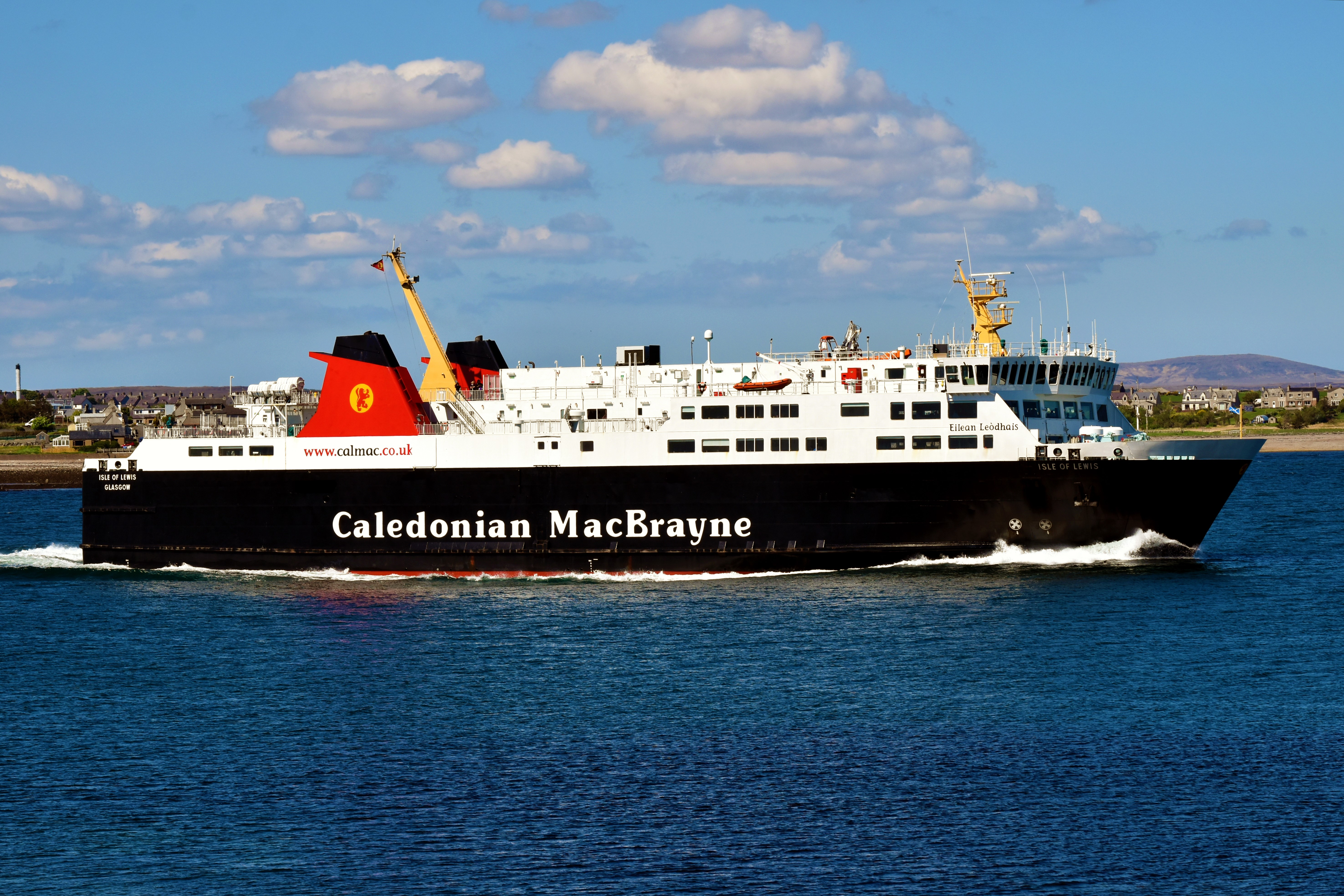
- Isle of Lewis departing Stornoway, May 2021

History

United Kingdom
- Name: MV Isle of Lewis; Scottish Gaelic: Eilean Leòdhais
- Namesake: Isle of Lewis
- Owner: Caledonian Maritime Assets
- Operator: Caledonian MacBrayne
- Port of registry: Glasgow
- Route: Oban - Castlebay; Ullapool - Stornoway (relief)
- Ordered: 22 September 1993
- Builder: Ferguson Shipbuilders, Port Glasgow
- Yard number: 608
- Laid down: 23 February 1994
- Launched: 18 April 1995
- Christened: by Princess Alexandra, The Hon Lady Ogilvy
- Completed: 26 July 1995
- Maiden voyage: 31 July 1995
- Identification: IMO number: 9085974; MMSI number: 232002521; Callsign: MVNP4
- Status: in service

General characteristics
- Tonnage: 6,753 GT
- Length: 101.25 m (332.2 ft)
- Beam: 18.52 m (60.8 ft)
- Draught: 4.19 m (13.7 ft)
- Propulsion: 2 x Mirrlees Blackstone K6 Major, 2 x Ulstein 1500 AGSC gearboxes
- Speed: 18.0 kn (20.7 mph; 33.3 km/h) (service)
- Capacity: 680 passengers, 123 cars
- Crew: 32

MV Isle of Lewis is a ro-ro ferry operated by Caledonian MacBrayne between Oban and Castlebay, Barra. Built in 1995, she remains one of only three ships in the CalMac fleet over 100 metres (328 ft) in length: the others are Loch Seaforth, almost 15 metres longer, and Glen Sannox, just over 1 metre longer.

Originally built to operate between Ullapool and Stornoway, Isle of Lewis rarely deviated from that route for 20 years. Since March 2016, she has served the Isle of Barra all year round from Oban. The only other Calmac routes she has ever worked on are:

- the triangle between Uig, Lochmaddy and Tarbert,
- and between Oban and Craignure,

but only ever during an emergency.

== History ==
Isle of Lewis was built by Ferguson Shipbuilders in Port Glasgow on the River Clyde, and entered service in July 1995. When constructed she was largest ship ever built by Ferguson. Her crossing time of around 2 hours and 45 minutes improved upon that of her predecessor, MV Suilven, by at least 45 minutes.

With increasing traffic on the crossing, there was speculation that Isle of Lewis might be replaced by a larger vessel. In September 2013 the freight vessel Clipper Ranger was chartered to relieve pressure on the route. On 10 June 2012, it was announced that a new £42 million replacement ferry was to be built in Germany. The new 116 metre long ROPAX ferry was named Loch Seaforth, and is capable of continuous operation, with a capacity for up to 700 passengers, and 143 cars or 20 commercial vehicles. Loch Seaforth entered service in mid-February 2015 and took over both passenger and freight duties on the route. Since moving to the Barra service in March 2016, Isle of Lewis has been relegated to the role of Stornoway relief ship each October when Loch Seaforth departs for overhaul, with a second relief ship taking care of overnight freight traffic, owing to Isle of Lewis' inability to carry certain hazardous cargo due to her fully enclosed and sealed car deck.

In June 2015, to assess her future deployment, Isle of Lewis undertook a tour of major terminals for berthing trials, with varied results. She called at Lochmaddy, Castlebay, Oban, Craignure, Brodick, Ardrossan, Troon, Campbeltown, and Tarbert between 4 and 9 June. No immediate decision was announced. Major work would be required to offset her stern ramp to starboard instead of to port, for her to operate on routes including Mull (Craignure) and Arran (Brodick). Such adjustments would not prevent her returning to Stornoway for relief work, as both Stornoway and Ullapool harbours now have full-width linkspans.

In September 2015, it was announced that the Isle of Lewis was to become the Oban–Castlebay vessel from the following summer, thus allowing MV Lord of the Isles to commence daily return sailings between Lochboisdale and Mallaig.

Isle of Lewis was on duty on the Oban–Castlebay route in 2017 when she undertook a series of special sailings between 4 and 6 June to transport those travelling to attend the funeral of Eilidh MacLeod, a Barra schoolgirl who died in the Manchester Arena bombing. As a mark of respect, the Isle of Lewis was shown with her CalMac pennant, along with the Barra flag, at half mast.

A history of the Isle of Lewis by Mark Nicolson was published by The Islands Book Trust on 31 July 2016, in time for the 21st anniversary of the vessel's inauguration in 1995.

== Future plans ==
In September 2024, CalMac confirmed provisional plans to retire Isle of Lewis and MV Isle of Mull after the new vessels MV Claymore and MV Lochmor are introduced to the fleet. On 9 December 2025, CalMac announced that Isle of Lewis would be retired from the fleet by the end of March 2027. From then, Isle of Lewis was expected to be replaced on the Barra crossing by MV Clansman. On 25 September 2026, CalMac published a revised Vessel Deployment, Disposal and Cascade Plan, indicating that when MV Glen Rosa enters service at Arran, the Oban to Castlebay service would be operated by MV Glen Sannox in the summer and MV Hebrides in the winter, with Isle of Lewis expected to be placed on the open market for sale.

== Layout ==
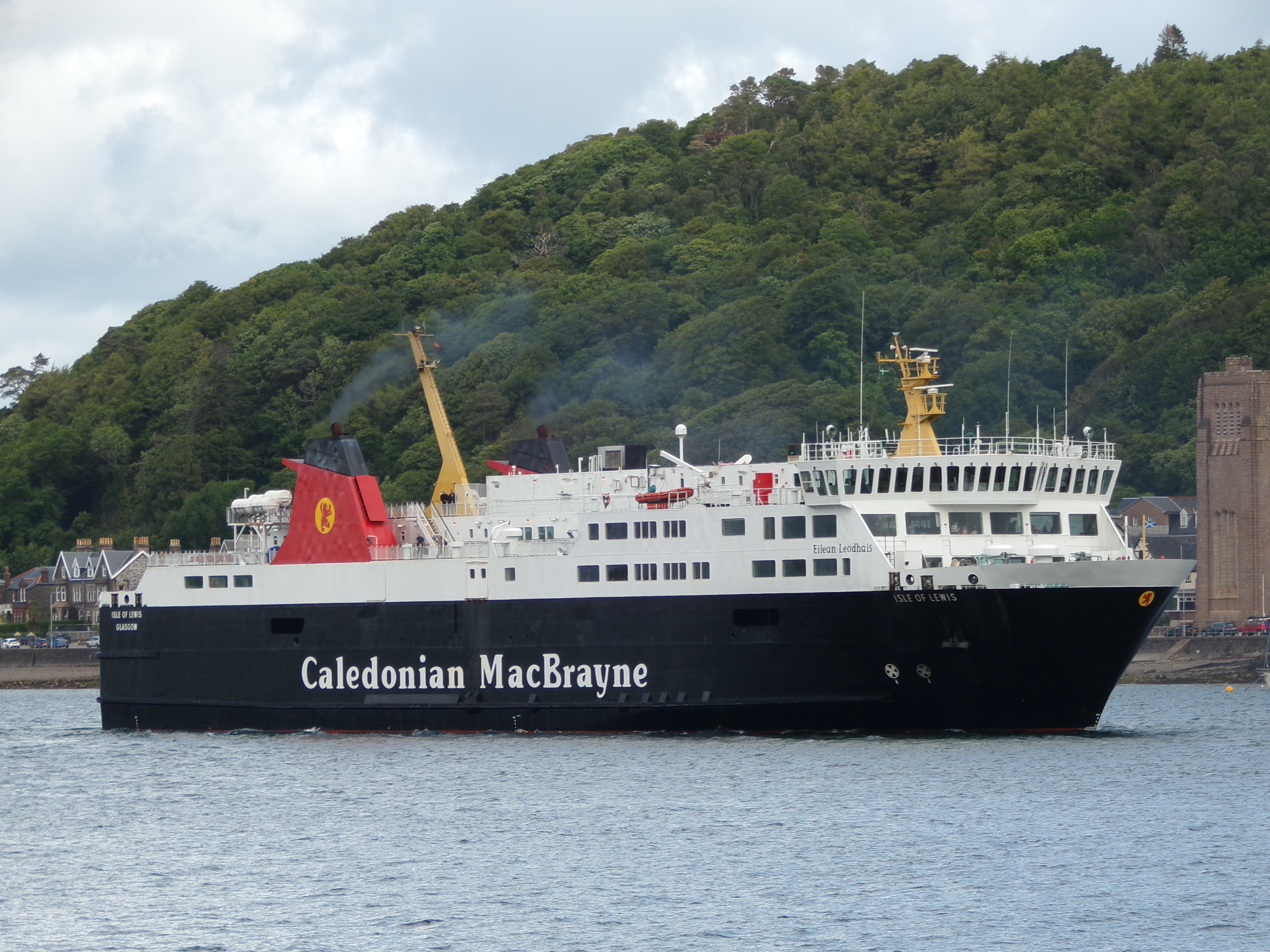
Isle of Lewis arriving in Oban in June 2026

Isle of Lewis is a further development of Isle of Mull and Caledonian Isles' design with a fully enclosed car deck. The car deck is accessed by bow and stern ramps, the latter being offset from the centre of the ship to accommodate the linkspan in Ullapool. The bow ramp is a folding design that is watertight and further protected by a conventional upward hinging bow visor. The bow ramp was originally offset to suit Stornoway's original linkspan until new facilities opened in April 1997. During an overhaul at Greenock in 2016, the bow ramp was changed to be offset to port in order to prepare her for her new role as the summer Barra ferry, to make berthing in Oban easier.

There are three lanes to port and two to starboard of the central casing. A hydraulically operated mezzanine deck along each side can be raised or lowered according to traffic requirements. Two stairways from the car deck bring passengers out in the entrance square on deck 4, where the passenger gangways enter.

The entrance square houses the information desk and gift shop. Forward is a large cafeteria overlooking the bow and occupying the full width of the ship. Aft are a designated dog area and a truckers' quiet lounge, with the reclining lounge and bar at the stern. Deck 5 houses the observation lounge at the bow, crew accommodation further aft and an open promenade deck stretching down both sides of the ship. Four stairways lead up to the open top deck, where seating is available.

The upper works of the ship are completed with two raked funnels in red and black company colours and two buff coloured masts. The smaller mast is on top of the wheelhouse and carries the twin radar scanners and radio antennae, while the larger mast is mounted aft on the promenade deck, carrying antennae and the house flag. During the winter refit in 2009, the funnels were fitted with angled exhaust extensions on the funnel tops to direct engine exhaust away from the decks. They were removed during her 2019 overhaul. The ship carries a fast rescue craft and two large motor-driven lifeboats, one to port and one to starboard, with a set of automatically deploying inflatable life rafts. The two large lifeboats were replaced in 2019 with new inflatable life rafts.

== Service ==
Isle of Lewis spent the first 20 years of her career sailing back and forth between Ullapool and Stornoway. Until April 2015, she had hardly sailed on any other route, and has endured some treacherous seas crossing The Minch, some of the most exposed waters around the British Isles. Tidal constraints resulting from her 4.2 metre draught make her unsuitable for full-time use on other routes. Her ramps not being suitable for many of the linkspans around the CalMac network further reduces her versatility.

Over the years, Isle of Lewis has called at other stations for a variety of purposes. During her initial delivery voyage in July 1995, she called at Ardrossan to collect supplies and to be formally handed over to her new owners, and then called at Uig, Lochmaddy and Tarbert for berthing trials to assess her suitability on the "Uig Triangle" should an emergency arise there, and made her debut calls at Ullapool and Stornoway a few hours later.

Two calls at Lochmaddy followed in April and May 1998, under charter to transport Ministry of Defence traffic to and from North Uist. However, Isle of Lewis suffered a major breakdown at Lochmaddy on the first charter, requiring repairs lasting roughly four weeks, and she was replaced at Stornoway by the smaller Isle of Mull. On 28 November 1998, whilst returning from an overhaul at North Shields, Isle of Lewis called at Stromness, Orkney to "show the flag" to demonstrate CalMac's keen bid to take over the Northern Isles ferry services from P&O Scottish Ferries.

Isle of Lewis was used on the 'Uig Triangle' again in 2008 and 2015:

- In November 2008, she called at Uig to uplift stranded freight traffic whilst Ullapool's linkspan was closed for maintenance.
- On 3 April 2015, she made her first commercial sailing on a route other than between Stornoway and Ullapool, when she carried out a special sailing from Uig to Lochmaddy for extra Easter traffic to North Uist. Further extra sailings followed, helped by the demotion of Isle of Lewis to the status of a back up vessel after she was displaced by the new Loch Seaforth. Isle of Lewis sailed between Tarbert and Lochmaddy on two consecutive evenings in June 2015. When Hebrides broke down in July 2015, Isle of Lewis relieved her on the full service between Uig, Lochmaddy and Tarbert for two days.

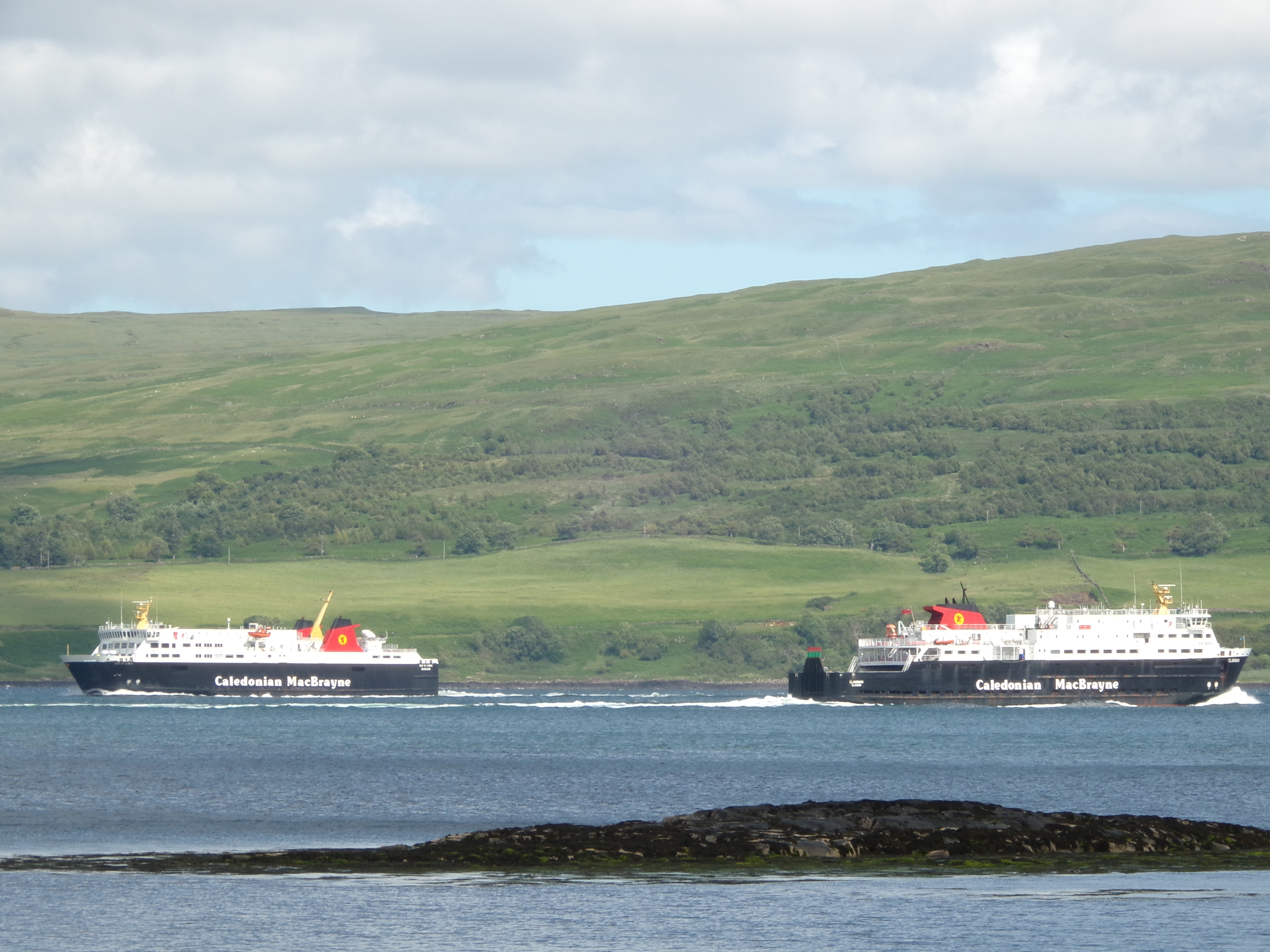
Isle of Lewis passing Clansman in the Sound of Mull, June 2026

Around the time of an RMT strike in June 2015, Isle of Lewis was drafted in to assist at Oban, and was to make her first sailings between Oban and Castlebay. This included a unique 0046 departure from Oban to Barra, on the same day as the annual Barrathon was taking place. Following redeployments due to the separate breakdowns of Finlaggan & Lord of the Isles in August 2015, Isle of Lewis again took over the Oban to Castlebay services, sailing direct, and omitting Lochboisdale as she was far too large and deep to use the South Uist facilities.

In early 2016, Isle of Lewis relieved on the Scrabster–Stromness route for NorthLink whilst MV Hamnavoe sailed for her refit. This was a reciprocal arrangement after MS Hildasay provided cover at Stornoway during the dry-docking of Loch Seaforth.

In March 2016, Isle of Lewis began a new phase of her life, serving Oban and Castlebay on Barra year-round, which allowed MV Lord of the Isles to commence a daily return service between Lochboisdale and Mallaig, thus ending South Uist's direct link to Oban. With Isle of Lewis' deployment there, the Isle of Barra receives a daily dedicated service. These summer arrangements, announced by Transport Scotland, are likely to be a stop-gap until the new MV Glen Sannox and MV Glen Rosa go into service on the Arran route. On her first official day on the Barra service, 25 March 2016, Isle of Lewis completed all of her sailings in spite of an amber alert of adverse weather and swell conditions.

Isle of Lewis returned to the Stornoway–Ullapool service in April and May 2021, while MV Loch Seaforth was undergoing repairs to the port engine. This left MV Lord of the Isles to combine the Lochboisdale and Castlebay services.
