= MV Lochmor (2025) =

Passenger ferry

History
- Name: Lochmor
- Namesake: Lochmor (1930)
- Owner: Caledonian Maritime Assets
- Operator: Caledonian MacBrayne
- Port of registry: (United Kingdom) Glasgow
- Route: Uig – Tarbert & Lochmaddy
- Ordered: January 2023
- Builder: Cemre Shipyard, Turkey
- Cost: £220 million for 4 ferries
- Yard number: NB1100
- Launched: 22 August 2025
- Christened: by Kay MacLeod
- Status: Under construction

General characteristics
- Type: Ro-ro vehicle and passenger ferry
- Tonnage: 750 DWT
- Displacement: 3830
- Length: 94.8 m (311 ft 0 in)
- Beam: 18.7 m (61 ft 4 in)
- Draught: 4 m (13 ft 1 in)
- Deck clearance: 5.1
- Propulsion: 2 × Voith Schneiders (at the stern); 2× bow thrusters
- Speed: 16.5 knots (30.6 km/h; 19.0 mph) (service)
- Capacity: 450 passengers; 100 cars or; 14 HGVs
- Crew: 27 crew; 27 crew cabins + 4 trainee cabins

MV Lochmor (Scottish Gaelic: Loch Mòr) is a roll-on/roll-off vehicle and passenger ferry currently under construction for use on Caledonian MacBrayne routes on the west coast of Scotland. She is the third of four ferries being built at Cemre Shipyard in Turkey for Caledonian Maritime Assets, and is expected to be delivered in 2027. She will operate services on the "Uig Triangle" routes linking Tarbert in Harris and Lochmaddy in North Uist with Uig in Skye.

== History ==
A contract to build two ferries, MV Isle of Islay and MV Loch Indaal, for the Islay service was awarded to Cemre Shipyard in March 2022. A £115M contract for two further ferries of a very similar design to be used on CalMac's Skye, Harris and North Uist services was awarded to Cemre Shipyard in January 2023. First steel for the final vessel was cut in September 2023.

On 30 November 2023, a public competition was launched to name the two Uig Triangle vessels, with the following options available for the second:

- Pioneer — a name previously given to a vessel serving a similar routes in the 1980s
- Lochmor — a name previously given to vessels that served ports of the Little Minch between 1930 and 1964
- Scotasay — a small island just off the east coast of Harris
- Clisham — the highest mountain in the Outer Hebrides, located in Harris

On 19 December, it was announced that Lochmor had been selected as the vessel's name. This will be the third ship to hold the name. Consequently the formal designation will be Lochmor III. She was launched on 22 August 2025 by Kay MacLeod, a long serving CalMac employee who works at Tarbert ferry terminal.

When ordered, Lochmor was expected to be delivered in October 2025, however in February 2025 it was announced that the vessel, and sister ship MV Claymore, were unlikely to be delivered until well into 2026. The shipyard blamed the impact of the war in Ukraine on steel supplies, Houthi attacks on vessels in the Red Sea, the 2023 Turkey–Syria earthquakes, a shortage of commissioning engineers, and snow and cold weather in Turkey for the delay.

On 26 June 2026, it was announced that CMAL had taken full legal ownership of Lochmor, as well as her sister ships MV Loch Indaal and MV Claymore, despite all three being unfinished. CMAL described this action as a "precautionary measure" due to potential economic challenges at the Cemre shipyard, which was taken to ensure that were the shipyard to go out of business the ferries could be completed elsewhere. As of September 2026, it was expected that Lochmor would be delivered in the first half of 2027. Transport Secretary Stephen Flynn also confirmed that total costs for all four vessels had risen by approximately £20M.

== Layout and facilities ==
Lochmor will be able to carry 450 passengers, accommodating 100 cars or 14 HGVs on a partially-open vehicle deck. She will have two mezzanine car decks, one being a single lane and the other having two lanes. The lower vehicle deck will accommodate either five lanes of cars or four lanes of commercial vehicles. A single catering outlet, serving hot and cold food and drinks, will be provided on Deck 6. A children's play area will be provided on Deck 5.

As is usual for CalMac major vessels, crew will sleep on board. Lochmor will have 31 cabins, allowing for 4 spare cabins for training purposes, with the normal crew complement being 27.

== Service ==
Lochmor and her sister ship Claymore will serve on the "Uig Triangle" routes, linking Tarbert on Harris and Lochmaddy on North Uist with Uig on Skye. The two vessels will replace the duty of a single vessel, Hebrides, providing an increase in vehicle and freight capacity on these routes, whilst enhancing the overall resilience of the wider fleet. Originally, it was intended that Glen Rosa would serve these routes, however Glen Rosa will now serve the Isle of Arran alongside her sister ship, Glen Sannox.
