= MV Caledonian Isles =

Scottish ferry ship, built 1993

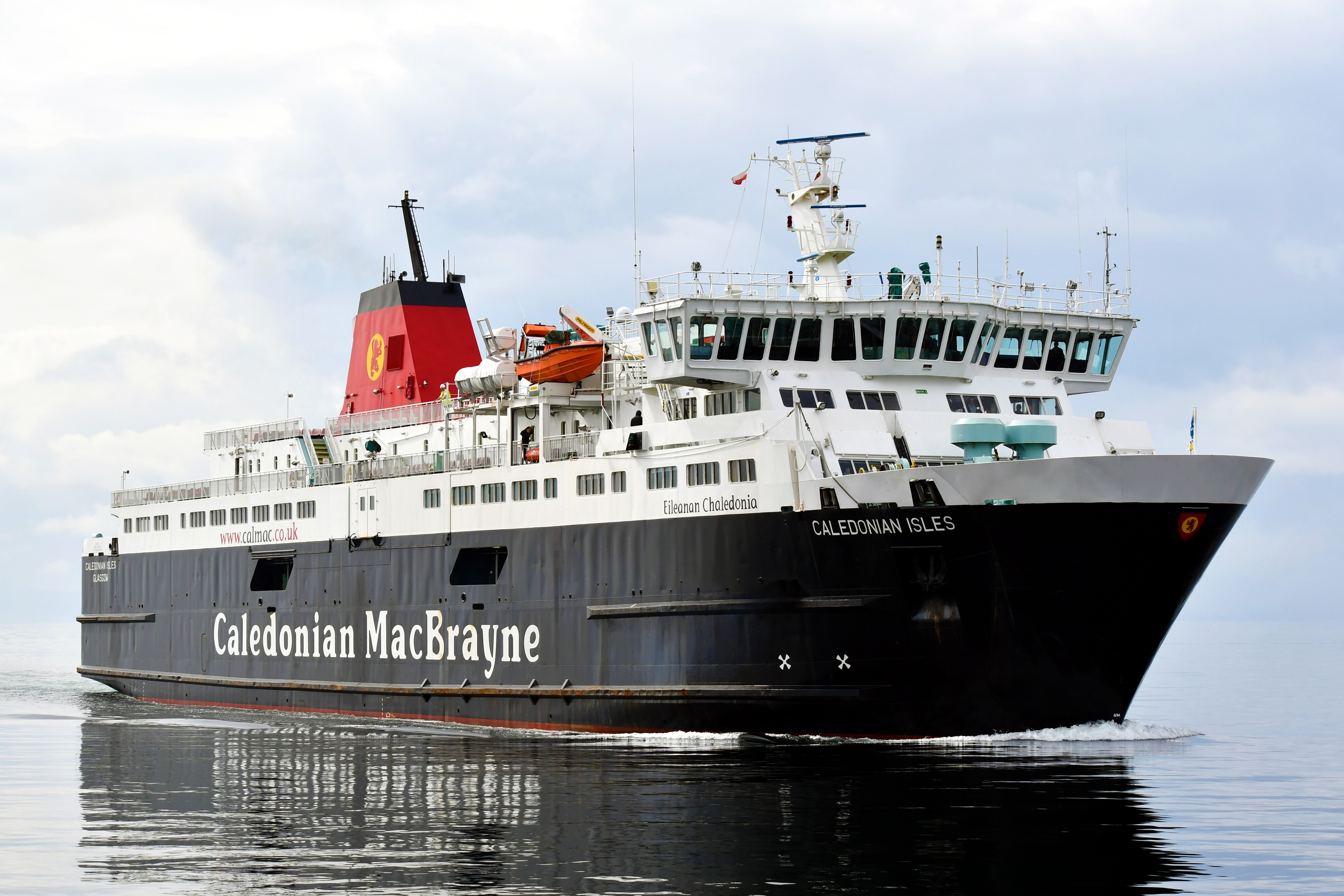
- Approaching Ardrossan Harbour in May 2022

History

United Kingdom
- Name: Caledonian Isles; Scottish Gaelic: Eileanan Chaledonia
- Owner: Caledonian Maritime Assets
- Operator: Caledonian MacBrayne
- Port of registry: Glasgow, Scotland
- Route: Ardrossan/Troon - Brodick
- Builder: Richards Shipbuilders, Lowestoft, England
- Yard number: 589
- Launched: 25 May 1993
- Christened: 25 May 1993
- Maiden voyage: 25 August 1993
- Status: In service
- Notes: IMO number: 9051284; Callsign: MRAB8; MMSI Number: 232001580

General characteristics
- Tonnage: 5221 gt
- Length: 94 m (308 ft)
- Beam: 15.8 m (51 ft 10 in)
- Draft: 3.2 m (10 ft 6 in)
- Propulsion: Main: 2 x Mirrlees Blackstone MB275/8T 2,200 kW (2,900 hp) each Bow Thruster: 2 x Caterpillar 3412 approx 520 kW (700 hp) each Generators: 4 x Volvo Penta D13EMG-FE 300kW each
- Speed: 15 kn (28 km/h) (service)
- Capacity: 1,000 passengers, 110 cars (90 modern cars)
- Crew: 28

MV Caledonian Isles, usually referred to locally as Caley Isles, is one of the largest ships operated by Caledonian MacBrayne (CalMac), which runs ferries to the Hebridean and Clyde Islands of Scotland. Caledonian Isles serves the Isle of Arran on the Ardrossan to Brodick route. As its CalMac's busiest route, Caledonian Isles has the largest passenger capacity in the fleet, and can carry up to 1000 passengers and 110 cars (reduced to about 90 wider modern cars), with a crossing time of 55 minutes. She is used extensively by day-trippers to the Isle of Arran during the summer.

== Layout ==
Modelled on the popular MV Isle of Mull of five years earlier, Caledonian Isles incorporates a fully enclosed car deck with watertight ramps at either end. When closed, the bow ramp seals the car deck and when open, forms the bridge between the ship and the linkspan. The car deck incorporates a set of mezzanine decks, one down each side of the central casing and each divided into three sections. These can be moved up and down to their deployed or stowed positions. When deployed, these allow additional cars to be loaded. If the mezzanine decks are fully deployed, there is insufficient height to accommodate lorries and other high vehicles other than at the bow and stern. The central casing means that she can only carry one lane of commercial vehicles down each side of the car deck. The increasing width of modern cars has reduced capacity to about 90 cars.

The passenger accommodation is similar to that onboard the Mull ship. Forward of the main entrance square is the cafeteria, with stairways leading up to the observation lounge and the outside deck. Aft of the entrance there are lounges down either side with toilet blocks, the shop and a bar lounge further towards the stern.

The next deck up has the forward observation lounge at the bow and crew accommodation. An open deck extends right around the vessel on this level, including forward of the observation lounge and overlooking the bow.

The upper deck has the bridge and outside seating from the huge red funnel towards the stern. Also on this level were the four enclosed lifeboats – 2 larger and 2 smaller boats mounted on davits. The 2 larger lifeboats were replaced in 2017 to make way for the new marine evacuation system, leaving one semi-enclosed lifeboat and one fast rescue craft.

== History ==
=== Construction ===
Caledonian Isles was built by Richards Shipbuilders, Lowestoft, being launched on 25 May 1993 by The Princess Royal and making its maiden voyage on 25 August 1993.

=== Service ===
Caledonian Isles has only ever operated between Ardrossan and Brodick on Arran. She normally undertakes up to five crossings a day in each direction, leaving Ardrossan at 0700, 0945, 1230, 1515 and 1800, and leaving Brodick at 0820, 1105, 1355, 1640 and 1920. The 1920 Saturday departure was removed during the winter 2016/2017 timetable to facilitate a 0820 sailing from Brodick on Sunday, where a crew safety drill has been a normal occurrence since October 2016.

During the period of the summer timetable there is an additional sailing on Friday evenings, leaving Ardrossan at 2030, returning from Brodick at 2140.

Sailings are met at Ardrossan Harbour by ScotRail train services to Glasgow Central.

During the winter season, Caledonian Isles goes for her annual overhaul, and is commonly relieved by MV Isle of Arran. Caledonian Isles has also been relieved by MV Clansman, MV Hebrides, MV Isle of Mull, MV Lord of the Isles, and MV Hebridean Isles, in addition to the chartered catamaran MV Alfred.

Due to the demand for capacity, a second ferry has supplemented Caledonian Isles on the Ardrossan - Brodick route during the summer season, an arrangement that lasted from 2005 until 2023. This peak summer service originally operated between June and August however, due to demand, operated from May to September since 2013. The additional service was provided by MV Saturn from 2005 until 2011, by MV Isle of Arran from 2012 until 2022, and by MV Alfred in 2023. During the summer 2012 period, Isle of Arran was limited to carrying 12 passengers, primarily HGV drivers, during the week, whilst a full passenger service was provided on Saturdays. From May to September 2013, MV Isle of Arran could carry its full capacity throughout the week, doubling the service to Arran from Monday to Wednesday. Isle of Arran undertook services from Ardrossan to Campbeltown on Thursday, Friday and Sunday, returning on Friday, Saturday (via Brodick) and Sunday, whilst still operating from Ardrossan to Arran outwith its Campbeltown sailings.

On first coming into service, Caledonian Isles usually berthed overnight at Ardrossan in the summer and at Brodick in the winter timetable. Now, she usually berths overnight at Ardrossan all year. During periods of adverse weather, it is not uncommon for the vessel to berth overnight at Brodick, with either cancellation of the 1920 service from Brodick, or a return to Brodick after the 1920 eastbound sailing. The 0700 sailing from Ardrossan the following morning is then cancelled. During adverse weather conditions, Caledonian Isles has been diverted to Gourock. This happened on 4 January 2012, following storm damage to the linkspan at Ardrossan.

In February 2012, Caledonian Isles was in dry-dock to repair damage sustained in a collision with Winton Pier, Ardrossan. She was relieved by Isle of Arran which was often diverted to Wemyss Bay and Gourock. In February 2014, MV Isle of Arran once again relieved Caledonian Isles after she broke down. In April 2015, MV Isle of Arran had problems with her prop shaft which delayed the introduction of her additional Arran summer sailings, leaving Caledonian Isles to carry all the traffic and run additional sailings at night.

In August 2015, it was announced that two new ferries would be built at Ferguson Marine Engineering at Port Glasgow on the River Clyde. The much delayed MV Glen Sannox entered service between Troon and Brodick in January 2025, with Caledonian Isles becoming the sole Ardrossan - Brodick ferry, replacing MV Isle of Arran. With new vessels under construction in Turkey, Transport Scotland announced in October 2022 that it was considering deploying MV Glen Rosa to Arran; it was confirmed in August 2023 that Glen Rosa would operate alongside Glen Sannox when she enters service, releasing Caledonian Isles.

Before heading to Birkenhead for an overhaul in January 2018, Caledonian Isles called at Campbeltown to test the berth. The last sailing from the old Brodick pier was the 0820 to Ardrossan on Tuesday 20 March 2018. She started operating from the new Brodick ferry terminal later that day. The new terminal has two ferry berths: the west side berth and the east side berth.

On 16 March 2019, Caledonian Isles rammed the pier at Brodick after her bow thrusters failed, causing significant damage to her bow visor. During her repairs, MV Hebridean Isles took up service on the Arran crossing, while MV Catriona operated a shuttle service from Claonaig to Lochranza to clear the backlog of traffic unable to board the smaller Hebridean Isles at Ardrossan.

In October 2019, Caledonian Isles was diverted to Troon as the linkspans in both Ardrossan and Gourock - the vessel's usual port of diversion - failed, resulting in vehicles being unable to board or alight from the ferry there. During this period, MV Loch Riddon operated additional services from Claonaig to Lochranza. Bad weather prevented Caledonian Isles from berthing in Troon, reducing the service to passenger-only from Ardrossan.

During her annual overhaul in 2022, unexpected steelworks were required, delaying the vessel's return to service. She was relieved by MV Hebridean Isles, thereby causing knock-on cancellations to services to South Uist, where the latter vessel was due to relieve next.

In April 2022, Caledonian Isles suffered a port engine failure and struck the breakwater. She was removed from service and relieved by Isle of Arran, with Loch Riddon providing additional capacity on the Lochranza - Claonaig route alongside Catriona. This caused significant disruption to the Arran service, with all vehicle bookings cancelled and a significant reduction in capacity. On Friday 22 April, CalMac announced that Caledonian Isles would remain out of service for at least three weeks whilst undergoing repairs in Troon.

=== 2023 Extended Overhaul and Berthing Trials ===
Caledonian Isles departed for annual overhaul in early January 2023. Initially scheduled to return to service on 2 February, she experienced significant delays during overhaul due to additional steel work and engine repairs being required. CalMac initially announced a provisional return date of 28 February, but this was later pushed back to 31 March, and then pushed back further to mid-April. During Caledonian Isles' absence, she was relieved by Isle of Arran. Hebridean Isles was scheduled to operate alongside Isle of Arran, however significant technical faults saw her providing a freight-only service between Brodick and Troon, before being withdrawn from service altogether in late February.

For summer 2023, Caledonian Isles ran alongside the chartered catamaran MV Alfred in place of MV Isle of Arran, owing to disruption across the CalMac network caused by the absence of Hebridean Isles.

On 27 October 2023, CalMac assigned MV Alfred back to the Arran route for her next period of resilience operations beginning on 4 November 2023, releasing Caledonian Isles for berthing trials for the Islay, Colonsay, Mull, Coll and Tiree routes. On 4 November she berthed for the first time at Kennacraig, the next day she carried out trials at Port Askaig, Colonsay and Oban (where she previously had only been to for bunkering). After overnighting at the NLB pier in Oban, she carried out berthing trials at Coll, Tiree and Craignure, before heading back south to Ardrossan. Upon her return to Ardrossan, Caledonian Isles broke down with a steering fault: MV Loch Fyne and MV Loch Striven operated a shuttle service between Lochranza and Claonaig for several days, with Alfred returning from the Western Isles to cover the Ardrossan - Brodick service.

=== 2024-2025 Withdrawal Disruption ===
In January 2024, Caledonian Isles departed for annual overhaul in Greenock. Her return to service was delayed as a result of the discovery of significant steel repairs being required. She was moved from Greenock to the Cammel Laird shipyard in Birkenhead in February. On 22 February 2024, CalMac advised customers that Caledonian Isles would remain out of service for an estimated further sixteen weeks. This was later delayed further, with an estimated return date of late August 2024.

During this period, Caledonian Isles was initially relieved by MV Isle of Arran and MV Alfred. Following the permanent closure of the Irish Berth in Ardrossan in February 2024, Alfred was unable to operate the route and so the service was operated solely by Isle of Arran, causing significant disruption due to her smaller capacity. From 29 March 2024, Alfred began to operate a supplementary service from Troon to Brodick, albeit not carrying motorhomes, campervans, caravans or coaches due to infrastructure restrictions. A shuttle bus service was also introduced to connect Troon railway station to the ferry terminal.

On 7 August 2024, CalMac announced that damage had been caused during testing in the Birkenhead shipyard, requiring further repairs and delaying Caledonian Isles' return to service until at least September 2024. She returned to Ardrossan on 21 September, however an issue with her port gearbox was discovered during berthing trials and she was forced to sail to Greenock for further repairs. She was expected to remain out of service until mid November. MV Hebridean Isles was moved from the Islay service to relieve at Arran, as MV Isle of Arran was also required to be withdrawn from service for her annual overhaul. MV Lord of the Isles also provided sailings on the route in between Hebridean Isles leaving for Stornoway and Isle of Arran returning from overhaul.

On 5 November 2024, CalMac announced that Caledonian Isles required further extensive repairs, and that the vessel could be out of service until the end of March 2025.

On 27 December 2024, CalMac confirmed that Caledonian Isles would be out of service until 27 March 2025. Additionally, CalMac announced that due to the redeployment of MV Isle of Arran, there would be no ferries running to Ardrossan from 13 January to 27 March 2025 inclusive, with MV Glen Sannox and MV Alfred to serve Brodick from Troon.

On 26 February 2025, CalMac announced that due to Caledonian Isles requiring additional remedial work to her propeller shaft tubes, she would remain out of service until at least the middle of April 2025. To partially mitigate this, CalMac also announced that the charter of MV Alfred would be extended so that she would continue to serve Brodick from Troon alongside MV Glen Sannox. On 3 April, CalMac announced that further problems had been discovered with Caledonian Isles, delaying her anticipated return to service until the end of May.

Caledonian Isles was expected to return to service between Ardrossan and Brodick from 12 June 2025, with MV Glen Sannox providing services from Troon to Brodick up to three times a day. However, Caledonian Isles developed further issues with her gearbox as she was preparing to enter service at Ardrossan, necessitating her return to dry dock, with no estimated time in which she would be repaired. On 15 July 2025, CalMac announced that Caledonian Isles would re-enter service by 7 September 2025, however on 22 July CalMac announced that Caledonian Isles could be out of service for a further four months owing to a need for further repairs.

On 17 September 2025, CalMac announced that Caledonian Isles was in the final stages of repairs and was nearly ready for service; after repairs were completely finished, she would undergo multiple sea and berthing trials, crew familiarisation, and safety checks. CalMac stated that she would undertake a phased return to service if she were to complete checks, and that a timetable for the Ardrossan to Brodick service would be announced later. On 1 October 2025, Caledonian Isles began a phased return to service between Ardrossan and Brodick, after being out of service for twenty months.

On 2 November 2025, CalMac announced that Caledonian Isles had been removed from service due to technical problems with the vessel's bow thrusters; she berthed at Ayr while MV Isle of Arran covered for her. Normal winter service resumed on 14 November 2025.

=== Future ===
It was reported that once MV Glen Rosa enters service at Arran, Caledonian Isles would be re-deployed to Oban, replacing MV Isle of Mull and partnering MV Loch Frisa on services to Craignure on Mull. On 9 December 2025, CalMac confirmed that Caledonian Isles was expected to be re-deployed following Glen Rosa's entry into service, however her new route was still to be confirmed at the time.

On 25 September 2026, CalMac published a revised Vessel Deployment, Disposal and Cascade Plan, indicating that when MV Claymore enters service, the Ardrossan to Brodick route would be operated by MV Hebrides in the summer and MV Finlaggan in the winter, with Caledonian Isles expected to be placed on the open market for sale.
