= MV Isle of Arran =

Scottish ferry

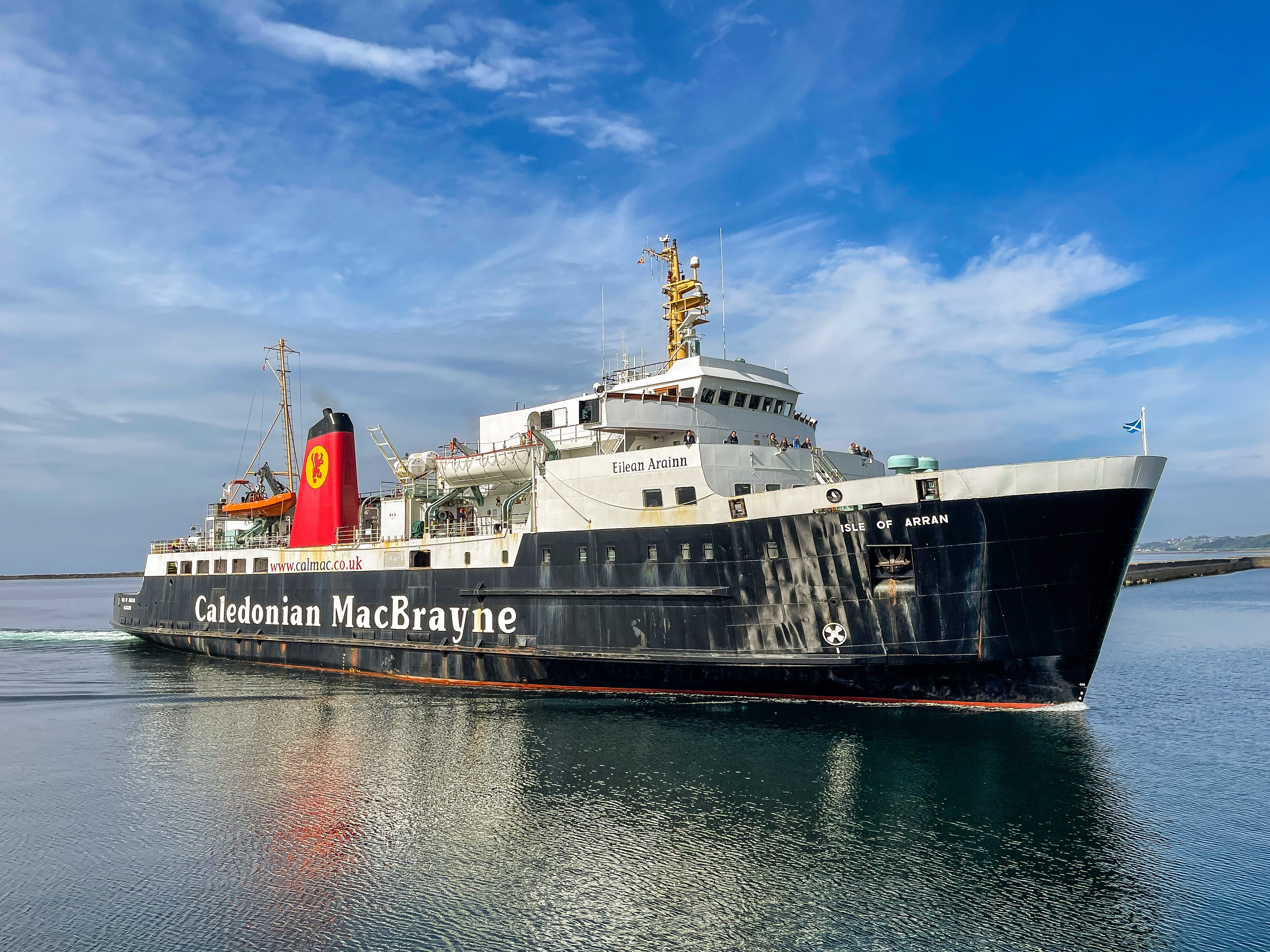
- On approach to Ardrossan, September 2021

History

United Kingdom
- Name: MV Isle of Arran; Scottish Gaelic: Eilean Arainn
- Owner: Caledonian Maritime Assets Limited
- Operator: Caledonian MacBrayne
- Port of registry: Glasgow, United Kingdom
- Route: relief vessel
- Builder: Ferguson Ailsa Ltd, Port Glasgow
- Cost: £6,700,000
- Yard number: 491
- Launched: 2 December 1983; by Miss Joanna Younger, daughter of the then Secretary of State
- Maiden voyage: 13 April 1984
- Identification: IMO number: 8219554; Callsign: GDMJ; MMSI Number: 235104000
- Status: In service

General characteristics
- Class & type: Vehicle and passenger ferry
- Tonnage: 3,296 gt
- Length: 84.92 m (278 ft 7 in)
- Beam: 16.24 m (53 ft 3 in)
- Draft: 3 m (9 ft 10 in)
- Propulsion: 2 × Mirrlees Blackstone 8MB275 diesel engines, each developing 2,310 bhp (1,720 kW)
- Speed: 14 kn (26 km/h) (service)
- Capacity: 448 passengers; 55cars
- Crew: 20

MV Isle of Arran (Scottish Gaelic: Eilean Arainn) is a RO-RO ferry operated on the west coast of Scotland by Caledonian MacBrayne. Also known by her local nicknames IOA and The Auld Trooper, she entered service in 1984 on the Ardrossan to Brodick route, serving Arran for nine years before being moved to Kennacraig. She returned to her original route in 2012, supplementing MV Caledonian Isles in summer and becoming a relief vessel for Arran in winter as well as other routes where required. In 2013, she started a new pilot route from Ardrossan to Campbeltown, which became a permanent fixture in 2015. As of 2023, she is one of the oldest vessels in the fleet, having been in service for 40 years; upon arriving into Oban in the West Highlands, celebrations were mounted ashore to mark the 40th anniversary of her launch and service on 2 December 2023.

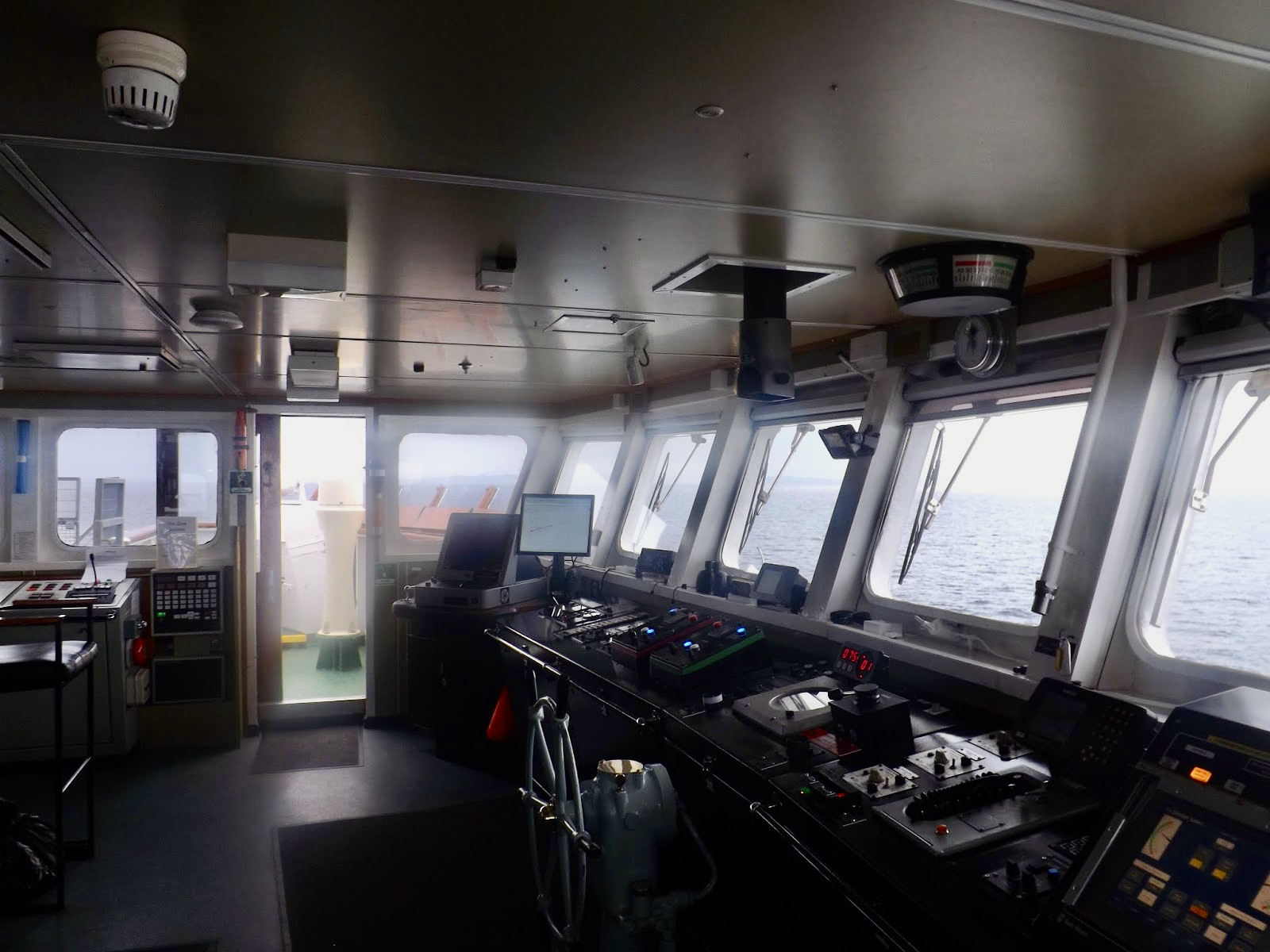
View of the bridge

== History ==
Isle of Arran was launched on the Clyde at the end of 1983. After fitting out, she made her way down to Gourock, where she showed the flag and tested her bow ramp on the linkspan. After further berthing trials at Ardrossan and Brodick, she eventually took over the route from the elderly MV Glen Sannox (which itself had recently replaced the failed MV Clansman) on 13 April 1984, providing a crossing time of 55 minutes. Her winter relieving vessels included MV Iona and MV Glen Sannox.

However, by the turn of the decade, it was clear that Isle of Arran was becoming inadequate for the role for which she was built. In 1993, less than ten years after her launch, she was replaced by the larger MV Caledonian Isles and left to take up the Kennacraig to Islay crossings. Replacing Claymore, she brought drive-through capabilities to the route. Despite having a much larger vehicle capacity, she could discharge a full load and take on another in the same, if not less, time than Claymore. Throughout the summer she made two or three return trips each day to Islay. On Wednesdays during high summer, her roster took her past Port Askaig to Colonsay and Oban, returning to Kennacraig after dark. The winter months saw Claymore or Iona relieving at Islay while Isle of Arran covered for the other large vessels at Oban, Ardrossan, Ullapool and Uig. She saw service on the majority of the drive-through routes on the west coast while continuing to have her own commitment to Islay during the summer. From the end of 1998, MV Clansman took the Arran and Lewis relief sailings and Isle of Arran relieved where needed.

Upon the introduction of MV Hebrides to the "Uig triangle" in March 2001, MV Hebridean Isles moved south to become the regular Islay vessel, and Isle of Arran became the spare vessel. An army charter took her from Ardrossan to Campbeltown in the autumn of 2001.

In 2002, she took up an experimental summer arrangement as a third large ship based in Oban, along with MV Isle of Mull and MV Clansman. In this role, Isle of Arran was able to improve several routes, carrying out additional sailings on a new roster incorporating runs to Colonsay, Coll, Tiree, Barra, South Uist and Mull. A new weekly sailing on a Thursday took her to Tiree before sailing through the Gunna Sound and across the Minch to Castlebay for mid-afternoon before retracing her steps to arrive back in Oban late in the evening. MV Lord of the Isles took over this roster in 2003 following the introduction of MV Coruisk at Mallaig.

In 2003, Isle of Arran returned to Islay to partner Hebridean Isles on a two-ship roster during the summer season. This arrangement doubled capacity on the route, and Islay could still be served on Wednesdays while Hebridean Isles sailed to Colonsay and Oban. These additional sailings were marked as such in the timetable, and could be cancelled at short notice as Isle of Arran was still the relief vessel. Prior to the 2004 season, she spent time in the James Watt Dock undergoing major work to replace her car deck. At the end of that season, she ventured north to Stornoway to relieve the freight vessel MV Muirneag.

Throughout 2005, Isle of Arran covered for Clansman, Lord of the Isles and Isle of Mull at Oban. Berthing trials at the new linkspan at Dunoon also allowed her to relieve there. The middle of the summer saw Isle of Arran handling all Islay traffic for a few days when Hebridean Isles covered the Tiree and Outer Isles rosters in place of the broken down Clansman. As the season ended, Isle of Arran returned to Islay to cover for the Hebridean Isles' refit.

=== 2010s ===
In February 2010, Isle of Arran struck the linkspan at Kennacraig while travelling at a speed of over 8 knots (15 km/h). No passengers or crew were harmed, but there was damage to the vessel and the linkspan. MV Finlaggan replaced her on the Islay service in 2011 and Isle of Arran again became a spare vessel. When not in service Isle of Arran is laid up at either Campbeltown or Rosneath.

Isle of Arran saw service on her original route in February 2012 whilst MV Caledonian Isles was away for inspection after striking the pier at Ardrossan. In July and August 2012, she operated the additional services alongside Caledonian Isles, a role filled by MV Saturn until the previous summer. During September 2012, she provided temporary cover on the Rothesay - Wemyss Bay service whilst MV Bute underwent engine repairs. This was her first time on the route and a temporary timetable had to be introduced as she could not keep the normal one. After the September holiday weekend, she remained at Rosneath for the winter, returning to Ardrossan in May 2013 to resume the additional summer service to Arran and piloting a new summer route to Campbeltown. In December 2015, it was announced that this route would become a permanent fixture in the timetable.

In February 2014, Isle of Arran once again relieved at Ardrossan after Caledonian Isles broke down. She later relieved at Stornoway after MV Isle of Lewis broke down.

In April 2015, she suffered problems with her engine shaft just before she was due to start her summer sailings to Brodick and Campbeltown, resulting in MV Caledonian Isles taking all of her traffic and offering extra sailings. Isle of Arran was repaired by the beginning of May and returned to service.

In August 2015, it was announced that Isle of Arran would be replaced in 2018 by MV Glen Sannox, one of two new ferries being built at Ferguson Marine Engineering at Port Glasgow on the Clyde. Glen Sannox entered service between Troon and Brodick in January 2025, with her sister MV Glen Rosa to be handed over to CalMac in 2026.

Isle of Arran relieved on the Uig Triangle, alongside MV Hebridean Isles, in January and February 2016 while MV Hebrides was away covering for other vessels. After covering at Islay, she provided extra Easter sailings to Arran, but after she resumed her regular summer timetable, she developed a propeller fault, leaving her out of service for nearly two weeks. From 3 to 21 January 2017, she relieved on the Ardrossan-Brodick route alongside Hebridean Isles while Caledonian Isles was away for her annual overhaul.

For two weeks in June 2017, Isle of Arran was out of service for emergency bow thruster repairs, resulting in MV Loch Bhrusda providing additional sailings from Claonaig to Lochranza alongside MV Catriona. After returning to Arran, she became the first ferry to dock at the new linkspan in Brodick, carrying out berthing trials on 21 and 26 June.

In Winter 2017/18, Isle of Arran was the main winter relief vessel. In November 2017, Isle of Arran assisted MV Hebrides by taking some Lochboisdale-Uig sailings while the Lochmaddy linkspan was being repaired. During February and March 2018, she suffered issues with her propeller shafts while covering for MV Hebridean Isles on the Islay run and was out of service for approximately two weeks. In April and May 2018, Isle of Arran delivered a shared timetable to Arran and Islay while MV Clansman was at Garvel Dry Dock at Greenock for repairs to her propeller and prop shaft.

In August 2018, Isle of Arran suffered further issues with her propeller shaft and was out of service for approximately two weeks while repairs were carried out at Garvel Dry Dock. After returning to service, she broke down a week later and was out of service for the rest of the summer season. Hebridean Isles assisted Caledonian Isles for the last week of the additional Arran and Campbeltown sailings.

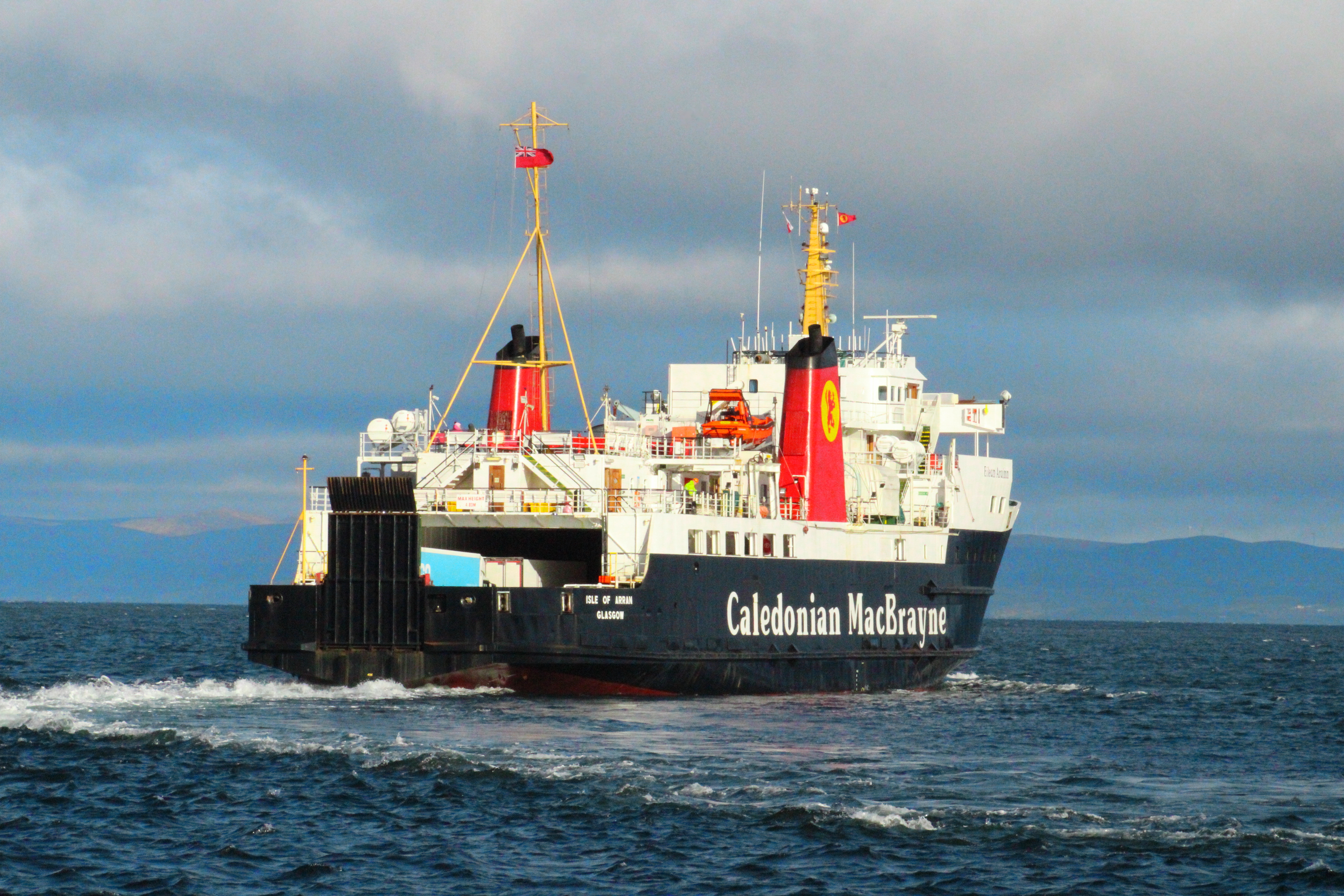
Isle of Arran leaving Brodick in February 2026

=== 2020s ===
In March 2020, at the start of the COVID-19 pandemic, Isle of Arran relieved on the Lochboisdale route while Lord of the Isles was covering elsewhere. Once MV Clansman returned, Isle of Arran made her way to Troon, where she was laid up until June 2020. She subsequently took up her regular post as second vessel on the Ardrossan - Brodick route, but was limited to carrying only 79 passengers due to social distancing. The Ardrossan - Campbeltown seasonal route was suspended. The pandemic saw the cafeteria and retail shop closed, with part of the cafeteria closed off for use as a crew mess. The rest of the year saw no change in her usual schedule, with her annual inspection carried out from late September until mid-October before she relieved other vessels.

In 2021, she headed to Troon for repairs. She returned to service a few days later and repositioned to Oban to relieve at Craignure. A few weeks later, she was again taken out of service at Stornoway in order for repairs to be carried out to a cooling system. On 17 April, after covering for MV Caledonian Isles, she visited Gourock to test the new linkspan before making her way to Stornoway to pick up the freight run after MV Loch Seaforth suffered a major engine failure. She only lasted a few weeks before swapping with MV Hebridean Isles on the Islay run due to stabiliser issues, meaning she had to head for more sheltered waters. During this period, the start of her season on the secondary Arran roster was delayed, but she eventually took up service on the route in early June. The passenger capacity limit was lifted in August 2021.

In April 2022, Isle of Arran returned to Ardrossan to provide additional services over Easter on the Arran run alongside Caledonian Isles. Soon after, Caledonian Isles suffered a port engine failure and was removed from service, leaving Isle of Arran as the sole vessel on the Ardrossan - Brodick route. MV Loch Riddon was deployed to run alongside Catriona between Claonaig and Lochranza to provide additional capacity.

In January 2023, Isle of Arran was scheduled to relieve Caledonian Isles alongside Hebridean Isles. Hebridean Isles, however, experienced significant technical faults: she initially operated a freight-only service between Brodick and Troon, before being withdrawn from service altogether in late February. Isle of Arran was forced to operate the service alone, with significant impacts on capacity on the route as a consequence. The situation was compounded by the delayed return of Caledonian Isles from drydock: initially scheduled to return on 3 February, Caledonian Isles' return to service was delayed further, initially until the 31st March and then until mid-April.

For the 2023 summer season, after being relieved at Arran by Caledonian Isles, she became the second vessel at Islay in lieu of Hebridean Isles, which was still undergoing repairs. The chartered MV Alfred served as the second vessel at Arran for the season.

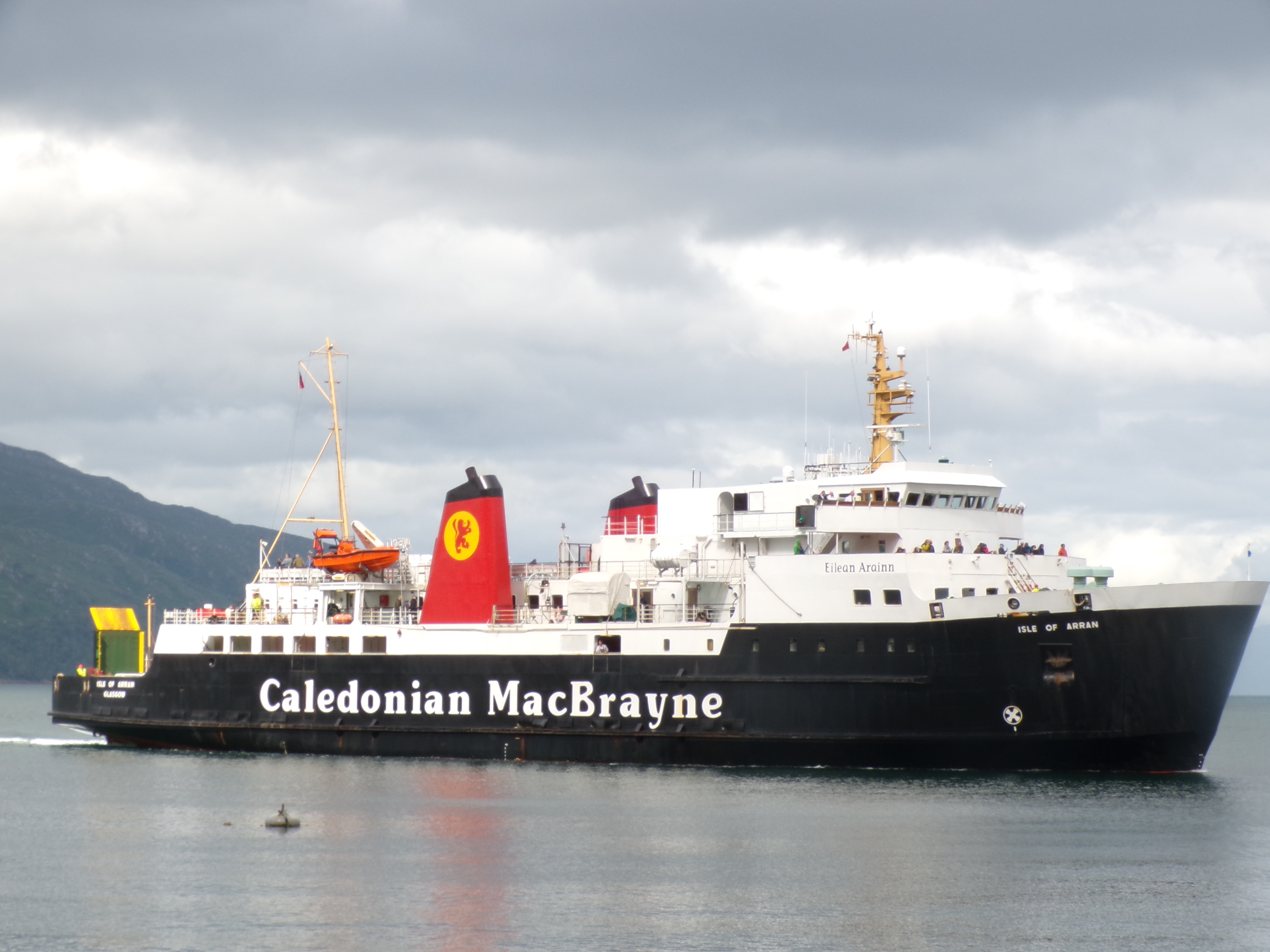
Isle of Arran arriving at Craignure, Isle of Mull.

In January 2024, she returned to Arran to run alongside MV Alfred, relieving MV Caledonian Isles for her annual dry-docking. Caledonian Isles experienced delays during her annual overhaul and was eventually removed from service for steelwork repairs. Isle of Arran operated the Ardrossan - Brodick route, initially alongside Alfred and then by herself. In February 2024, Isle of Arran operated between Brodick and Troon. This was in response to the permanent closure of the relief Irish Berth and temporary closure of the main Arran Berth in Ardrossan. Until her overhaul in October 2024, Isle of Arran operated between Brodick and Ardrossan, while Alfred provided additional sailings between Brodick and Troon.

On 10 June 2024, as Isle of Arran approached Ardrossan, a passenger fell overboard. The vessel's crew deployed a rescue craft and brought the passenger back onboard. On arrival, the passenger was transferred by ambulance to Crosshouse Hospital.

While Isle of Arran underwent her annual overhaul at the James Watt Dock from 24 September to 22 October 2024, MV Hebridean Isles and later MV Lord of the Isles covered the Ardrossan - Brodick service, with MV Alfred continuing the Brodick service from Troon. Upon returning to service, Isle of Arran continued to serve Arran from Ardrossan until the arrival of MV Glen Sannox on the Troon - Brodick service on 12 January 2025.

After finishing her duties on the Clyde, Isle of Arran was redeployed to Oban to cover other vessels on the CalMac network until April 2025, when she was redeployed to Islay for the 2025 summer season.

In February 2026, Isle of Arran returned to the Ardrossan to Brodick sailings, due to the continued issues with MV Caledonian Isles. The vessel was expected to only operate for a week, before Caledonian Isles returned to regular working, this didn’t happen and a single vessel service was provided between Troon and Brodick until 5 March 2026, when Isle of Arran resumed Ardrossan to Brodick sailings.

=== Retirement ===
On 9 December 2025, CalMac announced that Isle of Arran would be retired from the fleet by the end of 2026. On 25 September 2026, CalMac published a revised Vessel Deployment, Disposal and Cascade Plan, indicating that Isle of Arran would remain in the fleet as a relief vessel until August 2027, and is expected to be placed on the open market for sale after this time.

== Layout ==
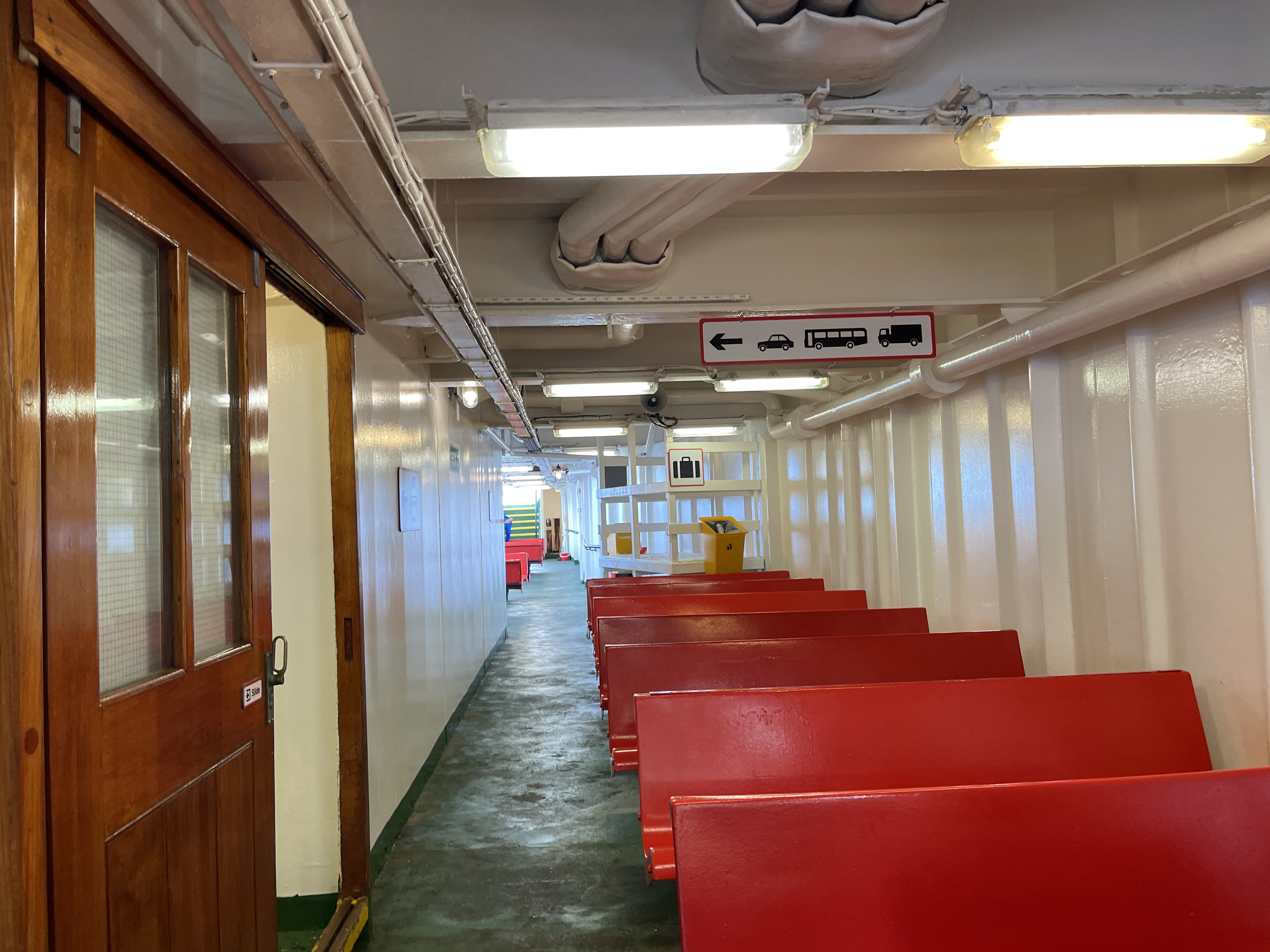
Sheltered seating area on Deck 3

Of drive-through design, Isle of Arran has an open plan car deck with space for 76 cars in five lanes. She is fitted with a bow visor and bow and stern ramps. The open stern allows her to carry tankers and other large vehicles at the same time as passengers. There is insufficient height for lorries and coaches down either side of the car deck due to a gallery deck. From the car deck one must go outside to access the passenger accommodation. On Deck 3 is a sheltered seating area, access to the car deck and passenger lounges, and a luggage area.

On Deck 4 is the main passenger lounge. At the aft end of the deck is a crew area and the galley. Forward is the cafeteria. The main entrance has an information desk, luggage racks and a gaming area. At the bow is the Coffee Cabin and shop with a lounge. On the port side is another lounge designated for dogs. On Deck 4 allows access to the exterior of the ship. The funnels are located mid deck, as are the three lifeboats and one FRC (Fast Rescue Craft). On Deck 5 passengers can access the popular open foredeck, accessible under the bridge wings. Above the cafeteria is an open deck with red plastic seating. This deck also has more areas for crew members.

On deck 6 is the bridge and the outdoor bridge wings, a feature which is now unique to her in the CalMac fleet.

== Service ==
History of the vessel's service
Period	Route and function
1984 – 1993	Ardrossan – Brodick
1993 – 1998	Kennacraig – Islay (summer) and winter relief
1998 – 2001	Kennacraig – Islay
2002	Oban 3rd vessel
2003 – 2007	General relief and Islay 2nd summer vessel
2007 – 2011	Kennacraig – Islay
Winter 2011 – Summer 2013	Ardrossan – Brodick (summer) and spare (winter)
Summer 2013 – Summer 2022	Ardrossan – Campbeltown and Ardrossan – Brodick (summer) and spare (winter)
Summer 2023	Kennacraig – Islay
Autumn 2023 – Winter 2023	General relief
2024 – Janruary 2025	Ardrossan/Troon – Brodick
March 2025 - September 2025	Kennacraig – Islay
October 2025 - present	General Relief

== See also ==
- Caledonian MacBrayne fleet
