= MV Claymore (2024) =

Ro/Ro ferry

History

United Kingdom
- Name: Claymore
- Namesake: From the Gaelic claidheamh mòr, meaning "great sword"; also a name previously given to vessels serving the Hebrides
- Owner: Caledonian Maritime Assets
- Operator: Caledonian MacBrayne
- Port of registry: Glasgow
- Route: Uig – Tarbert & Lochmaddy
- Ordered: January 2023
- Builder: Cemre Shipyard, Turkey
- Cost: £220 million for 4 ferries
- Yard number: NB1101
- Laid down: September 2023
- Launched: 2 May 2026
- Status: Under construction

General characteristics
- Type: Ro-Ro vehicle and passenger ferry
- Tonnage: Deadweight: 750
- Displacement: 3830
- Length: 94.8 m (311 ft)
- Beam: 18.7 m (61 ft)
- Draught: 4 m (13 ft)
- Deck clearance: 5.1
- Propulsion: 2× Voith Schneiders (at the stern); 2× Bow Thrusters
- Speed: 16.5 kn (30.6 km/h) (service)
- Capacity: 450 passengers; 100 cars or; 14 HGVs
- Crew: 27 crew; 27 crew cabins + 4 trainee cabins

MV Claymore is a roll-on/roll-off vehicle and passenger ferry currently under construction for use on Caledonian MacBrayne routes on the west coast of Scotland. She is the fourth of four ferries being built at Cemre Shipyard in Turkey for Caledonian Maritime Assets, and is expected to be delivered in 2027. She will operate services on the "Uig Triangle" routes linking Tarbert in Harris and Lochmaddy in North Uist with Uig in Skye.

== History ==
A contract to build two ferries, MV Isle of Islay and MV Loch Indaal, for the Islay service was awarded to Cemre Shipyard in March 2022. A £115M contract for two further ferries of a very similar design to be used on CalMac's Skye, Harris and North Uist services was awarded to Cemre Shipyard in January 2023.

On 30 November 2023, a public competition was launched to name the two Uig Triangle vessels, with the following options available for the first:

- Eubhal — the highest peak on North Uist
- Claymore — from the Gaelic Claidheamh Mòr, meaning "great sword", and also a name previously given to vessels serving the Hebrides
- Eilean Dorcha — a Gaelic name given to Benbecula, meaning 'Dark Island' in English
- Orasay — a bay in North Uist and tidal island in South Uist

On 19 December, it was announced that Claymore had been selected as the vessel's name.

When ordered, Claymore was expected to be delivered in June 2025, however in February 2025 it was announced that the vessel, and sister ship Lochmor, were unlikely to be delivered until well into 2026. The shipyard blamed the impact of the war in Ukraine on steel supplies, Houthi attacks on vessels in the Red Sea, the 2023 Turkey–Syria earthquakes, a shortage of commissioning engineers, and snow and cold weather in Turkey for the delay.

Claymore was launched on 2 May 2026 by Mary Morrison, former Port Manager at Lochmaddy. The remaining installation and fitting will be completed whilst the vessel is afloat, following which she will undergo sea trials and delivery preparations. On 26 June 2026, it was announced that CMAL had taken full legal ownership of Claymore, as well as her sister ships MV Loch Indaal and MV Lochmor, despite all three being unfinished. CMAL described this action as a "precautionary measure" due to potential economic challenges at the Cemre shipyard, which was taken to ensure that were the shipyard to go out of business the ferries could be completed elsewhere. As of September 2026, it was expected that Claymore would be delivered in the second quarter of 2027. Transport Secretary Stephen Flynn also confirmed that total costs for all four vessels had risen by approximately £20M.

== Layout and facilities ==
Claymore will be able to carry 450 passengers, accommodating 100 cars or 14 HGVs on a partially-open vehicle deck. She will have two mezzanine car decks, one being a single lane and the other having two lanes. The lower vehicle deck will accommodate either five lanes of cars or four lanes of commercial vehicles. A single catering outlet, serving hot and cold food and drinks, will be provided on Deck 6. A children's play area will be provided on Deck 5.

As is usual for CalMac major vessels, crew will sleep on board. Claymore will have 31 cabins, allowing for 4 spare cabins for training purposes, with the normal crew complement being 27.

== Service ==
Claymore and her sister ship MV Lochmor will serve on the "Uig Triangle" routes, linking Tarbert on Harris and Lochmaddy on North Uist with Uig on Skye. The two vessels will replace the duty of a single vessel, currently MV Hebrides, providing an increase in vehicle and freight capacity on these routes, whilst enhancing the overall resilience of the wider fleet. Originally, it was intended that MV Glen Rosa would serve these routes, however Glen Rosa will now serve the Isle of Arran alongside her sister ship, MV Glen Sannox.
