= MV Lochmor =

A number of motor vessels have been named Lochmor, including

- MV Lochmor (1930), A David MacBrayne mailboat, serving the Hebrides between 1930 and 1964
- MV Sailor, a car and passenger ferry known as Lochmor when operating between 1979 and 2001 for Caledonian MacBrayne
- MV Lochmor (2025), a roll-on/roll-off vehicle and passenger ferry currently under construction for Caledonian MacBrayne
