= MV Finlaggan =

RO-RO vehicle and passenger ferry

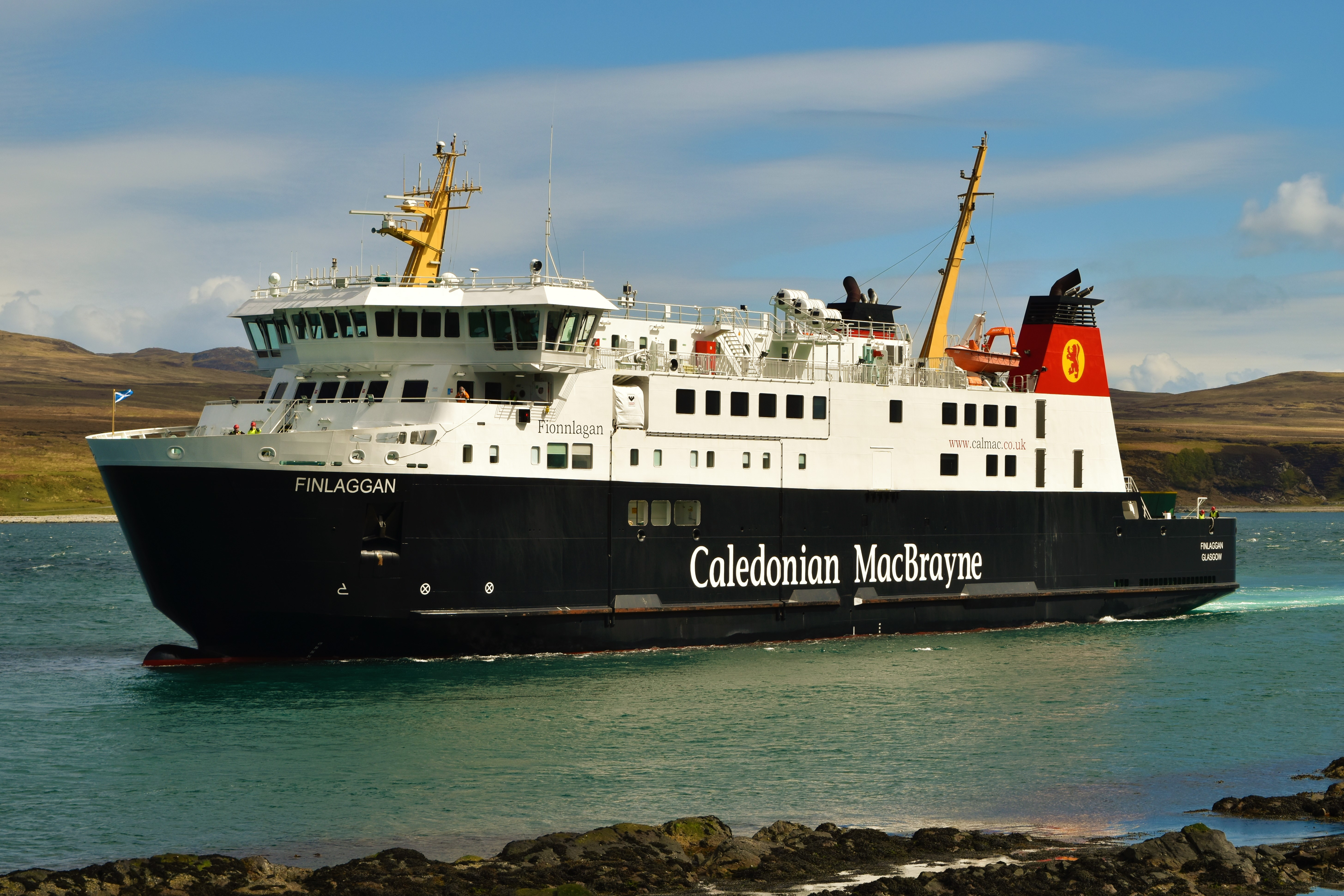
- Arriving in Port Askaig, Islay, May 2019.

History

United Kingdom
- Name: MV Finlaggan; Scottish Gaelic: Fionnlaggan
- Namesake: Finlaggan
- Owner: Caledonian Maritime Assets Limited
- Operator: Caledonian MacBrayne
- Port of registry: Glasgow
- Route: Kennacraig – Islay; Kennacraig – Colonsay – Oban
- Ordered: 2007
- Builder: Remontowa, Gdansk, Poland
- Cost: £25 million
- Launched: 30 June 2010
- Completed: 2011
- Identification: IMO number: 9482902; MMSI number: 235083892; Callsign: 2ECF2
- Status: In service

General characteristics
- Type: Ro-Ro vehicle and passenger ferry
- Tonnage: 5,626 GT; 740 DWT
- Length: 89.8 m (295 ft)
- Beam: 16.4 m (54 ft)
- Draught: 3.4 m (11 ft)
- Deck clearance: 5.05 m (16.6 ft)
- Installed power: 2 × Wärtsilä 8L32 (2 × 4,000 kW at 750 rpm)
- Propulsion: 2x controllable pitch propellers; 2x Bow Thrusters
- Speed: 16.3 knots (30.2 km/h; 18.8 mph) (trials); Consumption at Service Speed: 1240 Litres per hour
- Capacity: 550 passengers; 77 cars; 10 HGVs
- Crew: 34

MV Finlaggan is a RO-RO vehicle and passenger ferry built in Poland for Caledonian Maritime Assets Limited. From 2011, she has been operated by Caledonian MacBrayne on the Islay service from Kennacraig.

== History ==
MV Finlaggan was built in Gdańsk for the Kennacraig - Islay route. Launched on 30 June 2010, she arrived in Scotland in May 2011. During trials, she developed engine problems, forcing cancellation of the inaugural sailing. She had further problems with her bow doors, requiring withdrawal from service for overhaul of her hydraulic systems in Birkenhead.

== Layout ==
Finlaggan is of Ro-Ro design with bow and stern ramps. She is the first CalMac ship to have "clam shell" bow doors, which open sideways. The car deck is partially open at the stern and has a mezzanine deck capable of transporting an additional 18 cars.

She has three passenger decks, two with external panoramic seating. There are a restaurant, shop, and two disabled lifts serving all decks. Entering through doors on the car deck, stairs provide access to a lounge with a bar/coffee shop, games room and baggage storage. A further staircase, with a statue in the middle, goes to an upper deck which has the cafeteria, a lounge with dog areas, a children's play area and televisions.

== Service ==
Finlaggan has been the main ferry on the Kennacraig – Islay route since her introduction in 2011, partnering MV Hebridean Isles until the latter’s retirement in 2024. She replaced MV Isle of Arran, which moved back to Arran as the second vessel. During the winter months, Finlaggan often relieves on the Uig Triangle, such as for MV Hebrides' overhaul in 2013 and 2015.

Finlaggan is due to be replaced on the Islay route by two new identical vessels built in Cemre Shipyard, Turkey at the cost of £91 million. The first vessel, MV Isle of Islay, entered service on 31 March 2026, and the second, MV Loch Indaal, to follow later in 2026 after sea trials and crew familiarisation. Finlaggan was initially expected to become a dedicated resilience ferry once her replacements enter service, taking up duties currently operated by MV Isle of Arran. On 25 September 2026, CalMac published a revised Vessel Deployment, Disposal and Cascade Plan, indicating that Finlaggan is expected to become the dedicated Ardrossan to Brodick ferry during the winter months from 2027.
