= MV Loch Indaal =

History

United Kingdom
- Name: Loch Indaal
- Namesake: Loch Indaal
- Owner: Caledonian Maritime Assets
- Operator: Caledonian MacBrayne
- Port of registry: Glasgow
- Route: Kennacraig – Islay
- Ordered: March 2022
- Builder: Cemre Shipyard, Turkey
- Cost: £220 million for 4 ferries
- Yard number: NB1093
- Laid down: 24 May 2023
- Launched: 8 June 2024
- Completed: 18 November 2026
- Identification: 9970935
- Status: Awaiting entry into service

General characteristics
- Type: Ro-Ro vehicle and passenger ferry
- Tonnage: Deadweight: 750
- Displacement: 3830
- Length: 94.8 m (311 ft)
- Beam: 18.7 m (61 ft)
- Draught: 4 m (13 ft)
- Deck clearance: 5.1
- Propulsion: 2× Voith Schneiders (at the stern); 2× Bow Thrusters
- Speed: 16.5 kn (30.6 km/h) (service)
- Capacity: 450 passengers; 107 cars or; 14 HGVs
- Crew: 27 crew; 27 crew cabins + 4 trainee cabins

MV Loch Indaal is a roll-on/roll-off vehicle and passenger ferry constructed for use by Caledonian MacBrayne (CalMac) on routes on the west coast of Scotland. She is the second of four ferries being built in Turkey for Caledonian Maritime Assets (CMAL), and has been constructed for service on routes linking Islay with Kennacraig on the mainland. She was handed over to CMAL on 18 November 2026, and is now due to sail to Scotland, following which she will undertake crew familiarisation and berthing trials before entering service alongside her sister ship, MV Isle of Islay.

She is named for the sea loch of Loch Indaal, which lies on the west coast of Islay. The loch is well known as the inspiration for the folk song "The Lights of Lochindaal" by Iain Simpson.

== Construction history ==
A contract to build two ferries for the Islay service was awarded to Cemre Shipyard in March 2022. A £115M contract for two further ferries of a very similar design to be used on CalMac's Skye, Harris and North Uist services was awarded to Cemre Shipyard in early 2023. Taken together, the four vessels were originally expected to cost around £200M.

Following a public vote, the names MV Isle of Islay and MV Loch Indaal were chosen for the first two vessels, which would primarily serve the island of Islay. Loch Indaal was launched on 8 June 2024 by Elaine Anderson, wife of Jim Anderson (CMAL Director of Vessels), and was expected to be delivered in the second quarter of 2025. In February 2025 a delay to delivery was announced, with the shipyard blaming the impact of the war in Ukraine on steel supplies, Houthi attacks on vessels in the Red Sea, the 2023 Turkey–Syria earthquakes, a shortage of commissioning engineers, and snow and cold weather in Turkey.

On 26 June 2026, it was announced that CMAL had taken full legal ownership of Loch Indaal, as well as her sister ships MV Claymore and MV Lochmor, despite all three being unfinished. CMAL described this action as a "precautionary measure" due to potential economic challenges at the Cemre shipyard, which was taken to ensure that were the shipyard to go out of business the ferries could be completed elsewhere. Following this, in September 2026, Transport Secretary Stephen Flynn confirmed that the total cost for all four vessels had risen by approximately £20M.

Officials from the UK's Maritime and Coastguard Agency visited the shipyard in early November 2026 to complete certification. Final certification was subsequently achieved, and she was handed over to CMAL on 18 November 2026. She is now due to sail to Scotland, following which she will undertake crew familiarisation and berthing trials before entering service on the Islay route. Final delivery was thus approximately 18 months later than anticipated when the order was placed.

== Layout ==
Loch Indaal is drive-through ferry design with partially open vehicle deck. She has two mezzanine car decks, one being a single lane and the other having two lanes. There are the normal five car lanes and four commercial vehicle lanes for a CalMac vessel. Electric charging points are available on the car deck.

The stern ramp is able to change position depending on the port at which the ferry is berthed to allow ease of loading. This is a very similar design to the MV Glen Sannox.

== Service ==
Loch Indaal and Isle of Islay were ordered for the Islay services linking Port Askaig and Port Ellen with Kennacraig on the mainland, as well as providing a service linking Kennacraig to the island of Colonsay. They are expected to provide a 40 % increase in vehicle and freight capacity on the Islay routes compared to the service provided by MV Finlaggan and MV Hebridean Isles. They have been designed to deliver a significant reduction in emissions.

The two vessels are larger than the existing vessels serving Islay and Colonsay, and so infrastructure upgrades including dredging, new quay walls, strengthening works, fendering upgrades, facilities for shore power were required at Kennacraig, Port Askaig and Colonsay. Additionally, a new mooring aid was required at Port Askaig. These works were completed in March 2025 to allow these ports to be ready for delivery. Work on the second Islay port, Port Ellen, commenced in June 2026, with the port expected to be closed until 2029. During this period all sailings to Islay will operate via Port Askaig.
