= Dales Marine Services =

- Industry: Transport
- Founded: 1987
- Headquarters: Aberdeen, UK
- Key people: Kevin Paterson, CEO
- Products: Ship repair
- Revenue: $3.7 M
- Website: dalesmarine.co.uk

Dales Marine Services is a ship repair and maintenance company, operating 5 dry docks in the UK.

== History ==
Dales Marine was founded in 1987 by Maurice Nicol as a fabrication and repair of large industrial equipment, based in Peterhead, Aberdeenshire. The business expanded into ship repair and maintenance in the 2000s with a site at the dry dock in Aberdeen Harbour. In 2020, the business was sold to H2 Equity Partners, an investment firm, in a process facilitated by Corbett Keeling.

== Services ==
Dales Marine operate strategic sites in Aberdeen, Leith, Greenock, Montrose, AngusTroon, and Grangemouth providing comprehensive marine and industrial engineering services across Scotland. The company offers dry docking, afloat repairs, steel fabrication, welding, blasting and coating, mechanical and electrical engineering, marine renewables support, vessel conversions and shipbuilding services. They are the only company in Scotland licensed by Scottish Environment Protection Agency to provide ship decommissioning services. With extensive dry dock capacity and a highly skilled workforce, Dales Marine supports commercial, offshore, defence, fishing, ferry and renewable energy sectors throughout the UK and beyond.

In January 2021, Dales announced a 4-year contract to maintain 19 CalMac vessels. The work will mainly be at their Greenock facilities.
