= MV Isle of Islay =

CalMac vehicle and passenger ferry

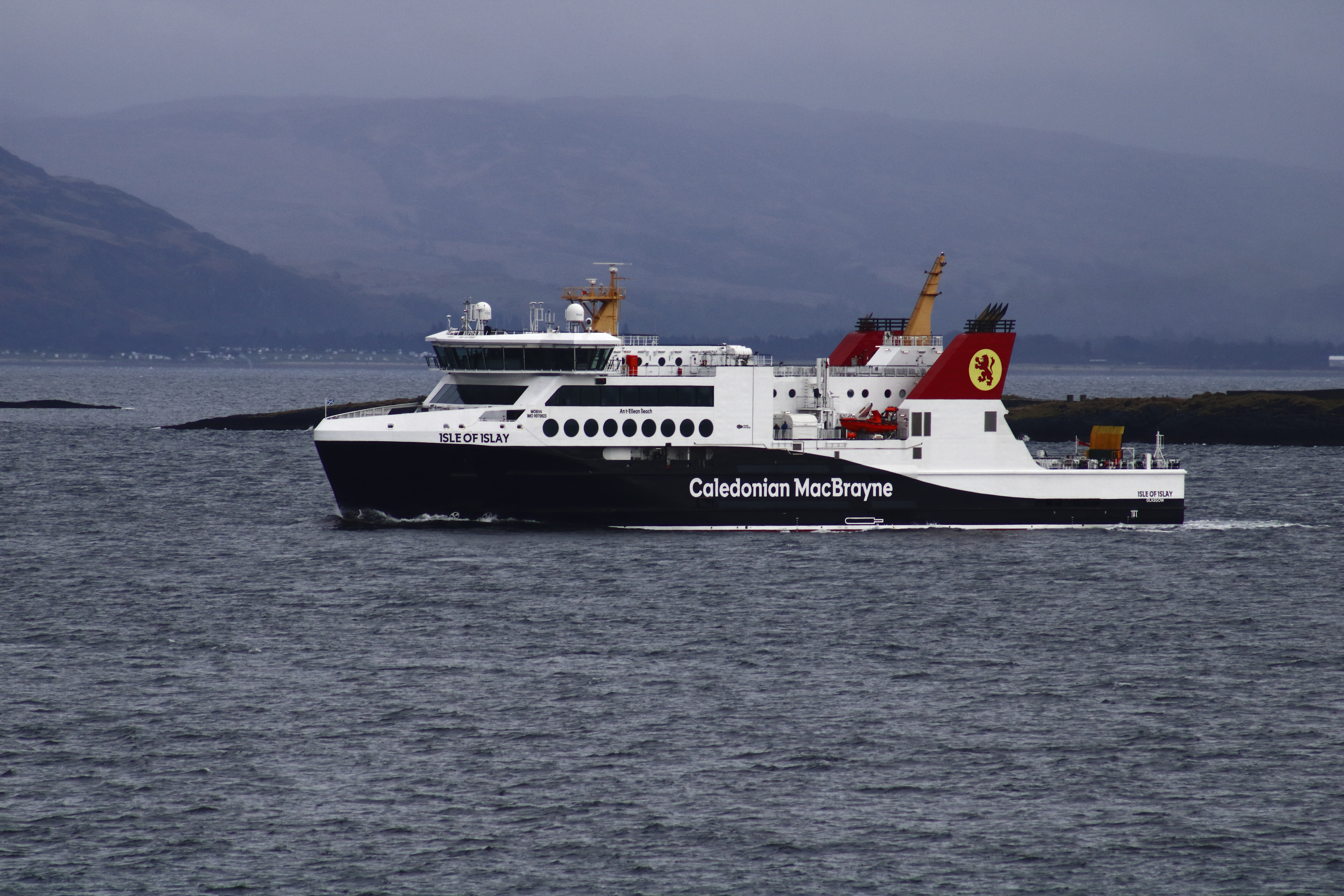
- Isle of Islay, in the Sound of Mull

History

United Kingdom
- Name: MV Isle of Islay; Scottish Gaelic: An t-Eilean Ìleach
- Namesake: Islay
- Owner: Caledonian Maritime Assets
- Operator: Caledonian MacBrayne
- Port of registry: Glasgow
- Route: Kennacraig – Islay; Kennacraig – Colonsay – Oban
- Ordered: March 2022
- Builder: Cemre Shipyard, Turkey
- Cost: £91 million for 2 ferries
- Yard number: NB1092
- Laid down: 13 January 2023
- Launched: 16 March 2024
- Completed: 15 January 2026
- Maiden voyage: 31 March 2026
- Identification: IMO number: 9970923; MMSI number: 232049280; Call sign: MOBV4
- Status: In service

General characteristics
- Type: Ro-Ro vehicle and passenger ferry
- Tonnage: 6,235 GT; 485 DWT; Deadweight: 750
- Displacement: 3830
- Length: 94.8 m (311 ft)
- Beam: 18.7 m (61 ft)
- Draught: 4 m (13 ft)
- Deck clearance: 5.1m
- Propulsion: 4x Wartsila W8L20 engines @ 1600kW each; 2× Voith Schneiders (at the stern); 2× Bow Thrusters
- Speed: 16.5 kn (30.6 km/h) (service)
- Capacity: 450 passengers; 107 cars or; 14 HGVs
- Crew: 27 crew; 27 crew cabins + 4 trainee cabins

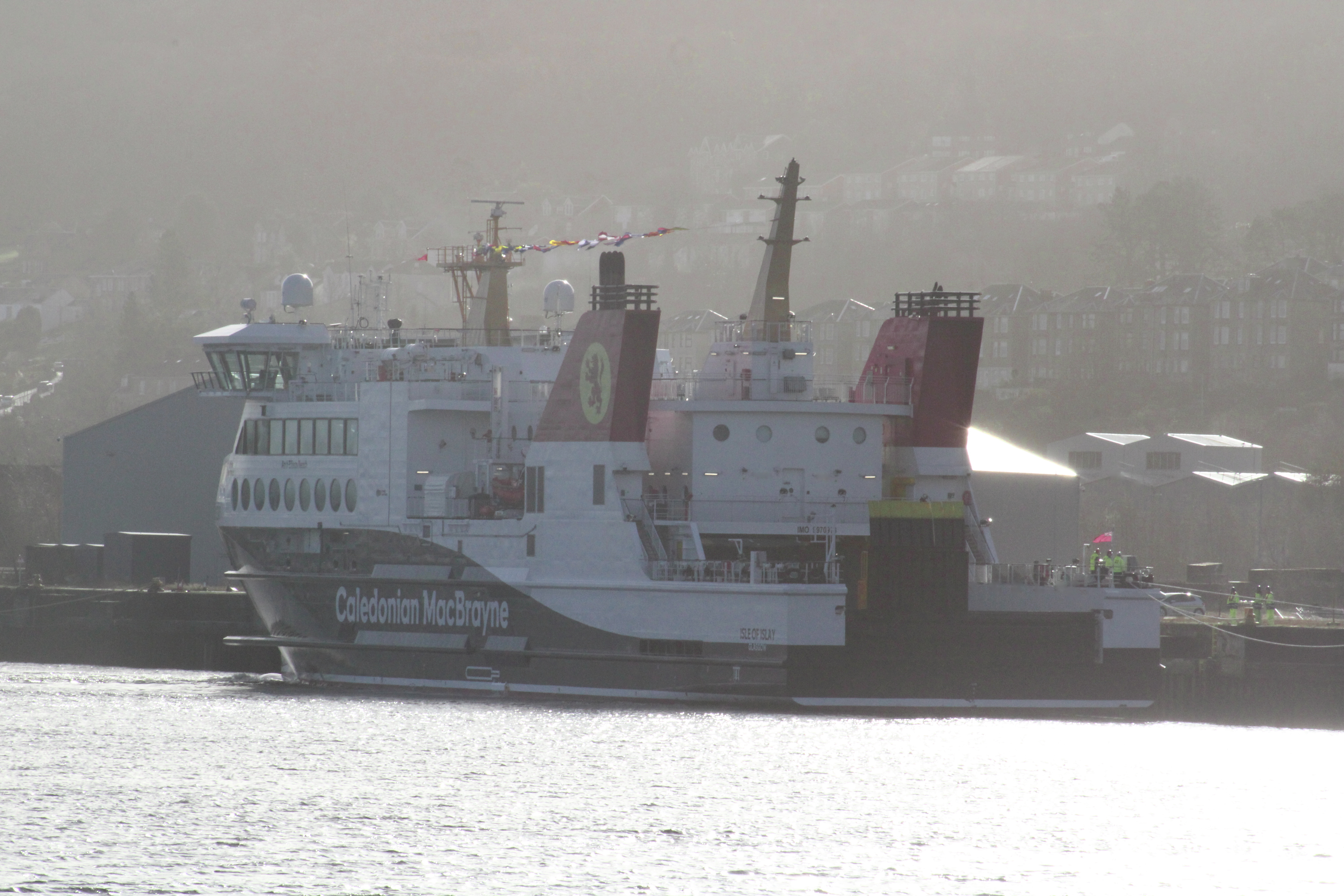
Isle of Islay after her delivery voyage from Turkey.

MV Isle of Islay is a roll-on/roll-off vehicle and passenger ferry constructed for use by Caledonian MacBrayne (CalMac) on routes on the west coast of Scotland. She is the first of four ferries being built in Turkey for Caledonian Maritime Assets (CMAL), and has been constructed for service on routes linking Islay with Kennacraig on the mainland. She was handed over to CMAL on 15 January 2026, travelled to Scotland via Gibraltar and the Bay of Biscay, and arrived at Inchgreen Quay, Greenock, on 22 February. She entered service on the Islay route on 31 March 2026.

== Construction history ==
A contract to build two ferries for the Islay service was awarded to Cemre Shipyard in March 2022. A £115M contract for two further ferries of the same design for CalMac's Skye, Harris and North Uist service was awarded to Cemre Shipyard in early 2023.

The first steel for the first of the four vessels was cut on 3 October 2022, and her keel was laid on 13 January 2023, the same week that the first steel was cut for the second vessel. Following a public vote, the names Isle of Islay and Loch Indaal were chosen for the first two vessels, which would primarily serve the island of Islay. Isle of Islay was launched on 16 March 2024 by Morag McNeill, the chair of CMAL. The vessel was expected to be delivered by the end of that year, however this was later altered to the first quarter of 2025. In February 2025 further delays were announced, with the shipyard blaming the impact of the war in Ukraine on steel supplies, Houthi attacks on vessels in the Red Sea, the 2023 Turkey–Syria earthquakes, a shortage of commissioning engineers, and snow and cold weather in Turkey.

In May 2025, Isle of Islay undertook initial sea trials in the Sea of Marmara. A second set of sea trials in the Sea of Marmara was undertaken 16–20 July 2025, after which the vessel returned to the shipyard for further outfitting work, including fitting of the internal lifts and roll-on/roll-off gear. Acceptance tests with personnel from CMAL, Lloyd's Register and the Maritime and Coastguard Agency took place in late September 2025; following completion of the trials it was announced that the ferry would be handed over to CMAL in November; this date was later put back to early 2026.

On 15 January 2026, ownership of Isle of Islay was handed over to CMAL. She began her journey to Scotland on 22 January 2026, travelling via Gibraltar and the Bay of Biscay, calling at Catania, Gibraltar, Almeria (due to adverse weather) and A Coruña. During the voyage, Isle of Islay was involved in the rescue of a man who was spotted in the Mediterranean Sea during stormy conditions off Morocco. The crew deployed the fast rescue craft to recover the man, who was later handed over to Moroccan authorities.

The voyage to Scotland was expected to take around two weeks, but difficult sea conditions in the Mediterranean and North Atlantic extended this to four and a half weeks. The vessel arrived in Inchgreen, Greenock on 22 February 2026. Following passage to Scotland, crew familiarisation and berthing trials across the CalMac network were carried out. It was hoped that Isle of Islay would be available for use from the start of the summer season on Friday 27 March, however snagging issues led to a delay, and she entered service on the Islay route on 31 March 2026.

== Layout ==
Isle of Islay is of a drive-through design, with a partially open vehicle deck. She has two mezzanine car decks, one being a single lane and the other having two lanes. The lower deck has a configuration allowing for five car lanes or four commercial vehicle lanes. Electric charging points are available on the car deck.

The stern ramp is able to change position depending on the port at which the ferry is berthed to allow ease of loading. This is a very similar design to the MV Glen Sannox.

== Service history ==
Isle of Islay and MV Loch Indaal were ordered for the Islay services linking Port Askaig and Port Ellen with Kennacraig on the mainland, as well as providing a service linking Kennacraig to the island of Colonsay via Port Askaig. They are expected to provide a 40% increase in vehicle and freight capacity on the Islay routes compared to the service provided by MV Finlaggan and MV Hebridean Isles. They were designed to deliver a significant reduction in emissions. The two vessels were larger than the previous vessels serving Islay and Colonsay, and so infrastructure upgrades including dredging, new quay walls, strengthening works, fendering upgrades, and facilities for shore power were required at Kennacraig, Port Askaig and Colonsay. Additionally, a new mooring aid was required at Port Askaig. These works were completed in March 2025 to allow the ports to be ready for delivery. Work on the second Islay port, Port Ellen, commenced in June 2026, with the port expected to be closed until 2029. During this period all sailings to Islay will operate via Port Askaig.

Although Isle of Islay is primarily intended to operate on services to Islay, she has been designed to be suitable for use across the CalMac network. After just over a week of service on her intended route, it was announced that she would be temporarily transferred to the Oban to Barra service, covering for the delayed return of MV Isle of Lewis from annual overhaul. The chartered catamaran, MV Alfred, was moved to Kennacraig to act as second vessel on the Islay service in Isle of Islay's absence, however berthing trials revealed that tidal surges at Kennacraig would make it difficult for Alfred to provide a reliable service on the route. Isle of Islay therefore returned to the Islay routes on 21 April 2026, having been replaced on the Oban to Barra service by MV Glen Sannox.

Having operated for around 3 months, Isle of Islay was taken out of service for the period 15-28 July 2026 to allow for repairs to be undertaken on her bow ramp and visor. Additionally, around 150 other issues were addressed under manufacturer warranty. During this period MV Isle of Arran operated on the route to Islay. Following Isle of Islay's return to service further issues were identified with the bow doors, meaning as of September 2026 vehicles could only load via the stern. Additionally, a separate fault with the mezzanine deck means her carrying capacity is reduced: repairs are expected to be undertaken as part of the annual overhaul in February 2027.
