= MV Loch Seaforth =

MV Loch Seaforth may refer to:

- MV Loch Seaforth (1947) Stornoway mailboat operated by David MacBrayne from 1947 until 1972
- MV Loch Seaforth (2014), a Calmac ferry built in 2014 for the Stornoway – Ullapool route.
