= Cemre Shipyard =

Shipyard in Turkey

Coordinates: 40.7236°N 29.4942°E

- Industry: Transport
- Founded: 2005
- Headquarters: Altınova, Turkey
- Key people: H. Si̇nan Kavala (COO)
- Products: shipbuilding
- Revenue: $287.8 million
- Number of employees: 5,039
- Website: www.cemreshipyard.com

Cemre Shipyard (Turkish: Cemre Tersanesi) is a shipyard in Altınova, on the shore of the Sea of Marmara in Yalova Province, Turkey. Established in 2005, they now specialise in low- and zero-emission, battery and hybrid vessels for the world market.

== History ==
Cemre signed the first shipbuilding contract with Havyard Group in 2005 and delivered Havila Mars the following year, from a rented yard. They developed their own facilities in Altınova and expanded quickly, reaching 78,000 m^{2} by 2009. A second slipway was built in 2012 and a further 78,000 m^{2} shipyard, Cemre II was added in 2015. Cemre has constructed over 50 hulls which were then fitted out by Havyard Ship Technology (HST) in Leirvik, Norway.

The first fishing vessel, Østerbris, was delivered in 2014. Cemre moved into construction of passenger vessels, with the delivery of Bastø VI in 2016. Offshore support vessels followed, with specialisation in windfarm support vessels and low- and zero-emission, battery and hybrid vessels.

=== Windfarm support vessels ===
Cemre Shipyard entered the wind farm market in 2014, when they were selected to build one Service Operations Vessel (SOV) for Danish company, Esvagt, Esvagt Mercator. This was followed by Wind of Change for French ship-owner Louis Dreyfus Armateurs. Wind of Change is equipped with a Heave Compensated Gangway (providing continuous access to the turbines), a 3D Crane, helideck and a side boat landing. Delivered in April 2019, she operates for Ørsted in German waters. She has a DP system and an innovative DC grid developed by ABB.

Groenewind is the first DP2, twin-hulled SOV in the world. She serves offshore wind farms in Belgium.

=== Low emission ferries ===
- Scandlines ordered the world's largest zero-emission ferry, with 10 MWh battery capacity.
- Danish ferry operator Molslinjen ordered two new electric ferries.
- Norwegian ferry company Torghatten Nord AS contracted Cemre Shipyard to build a zero-emission, battery-electric ferry.

Ships built by Cemre Shipyard
yard number	name	type	year
NB1101	Claymore	Passenger Vessel (Caledonian MacBrayne)	2025
NB1100	Lochmor	Passenger Vessel (Caledonian MacBrayne)	2025
NB1099	MV Tyrfing	Passenger Vessel (Molslinjen/Samsølinjen)	2025
NB1098	MV Nerthus	Passenger Vessel (Molslinjen/Alslinjen)	2024
NB1096		Windfarm Support Vessel	
NB1095		Windfarm Support Vessel	
NB1094	Esvagt	Windfarm Support Vessel	
NB1093	Loch Indaal	Passenger Vessel (Caledonian MacBrayne)	2025
NB1092	Isle of Islay	Passenger Vessel (Caledonian MacBrayne)	2024
NB1091	Hinnøy	Passenger Vessel (Torghatten Nord)	
NB1090	MV Futura	Passenger Vessel (Scandlines)	2024
NB0078	Liafjord	Pelagic Trawler	
NB0077	Seigrunn	Live Fish Carrier	
NB0076	Seifjell	Live Fish Carrier	
NB0075	Selvåg Senior	Purse Seiner / Trawler	2023
NB0074	Sunny Lady	Purse Seiner / Trawler	2022
NB0073	Veronica	Midwater Trawler	2022
NB0071	Lauren	Midwater Trawler	2022
NB0070	Leila	Midwater Trawler	2021
NB0065	Hardhaus	Purse Seiner / Trawler	2021
NB0067	Wind of Hope	Windfarm Support Vessel	2021
NB0072	Groenewind	Windfarm Support Vessel	2021
NB0064	Libas	Purse Seiner / Trawler	2021
NB0151 - HST0151	Åsværfjord	Live Fish Carrier	2021
NB0066	Olympic Prawn	Stern Trawler	2020
NB0150 - HST0150	Kristiansund	Live Fish Carrier	2020
NB0149 - HST0149	Esvagt Havelok	Service Operation Vessel	2020
NB0148 - HST0148	Esvagt Alba	Service Operation Vessel	2020
NB0069	Grip	Passenger Vessel (Fjord1)	2020
NB0146 - HST0146	Esvagt Schelde	Service Operation Vessel	2020
NB0068	Tustna	Passenger Vessel (Fjord1)	2019
NB0087 - HST0147	Reisa	Live Fish Carrier	2019
NB0084 - HST0145	Stangvikfjord	Passenger Vessel (Fjord1)	2019
NB0082 - HST0143	Møringen	Passenger Vessel (Fjord1)	2019
NB0083 - HST0144	Smøla	Passenger Vessel (Fjord1)	2019
NB0080 - HST0141	Austrheim	Passenger Vessel	2019
NB0081- HST0142	Bømlafjord	Passenger Vessel (Fjord1)	2019
NB0057	Wind of Change	Windfarm Support Vessel	2019
NB0063 - HST0140	Skopphorn	Passenger Vessel (Fjord1)	2019
NB0062 - HST0139	Rovdehorn	Passenger Vessel (Fjord1)	2019
NB0058 - HST0135	Ronja Storm	Live Fish Carrier	2019
NB0061 - HST0138	Giskoy	Passenger Vessel (Fjord1)	2018
NB0060 - HST0137	Suloy	Passenger Vessel (Fjord1)	2018
NB0059 - HST0136	Hadaroy	Passenger Vessel (Fjord1)	2018
NB0056 - HST0134	Vestratt	Passenger Vessel (Fjord1)	2018
NB0055 - HST0133	Austratt	Passenger Vessel (Fjord1)	2018
NB0054 - HST0132	Husavik	Passenger Vessel (Fjord1)	2018
NB0053	Esvagt Innovator	Multi-Purpose Vessel	2018
NB0052	Victoria of Wight	Passenger Vessel (Wightlink)	2018
NB0048	Esvagt Mercator	SOV	2017
NB0044	Bjorg	Wet Fish Trawler	2017
NB0043	Drangey Sk 2	Wet Fish Trawler	2017
NB0042	Björgulfur	Wet Fish Trawler	2017
NB0041	Kaldbakur	Wet Fish Trawler	2017
NB0051 - HST0127	Steigen	Live Fish Carrier	2016
NB0046	Basto VI	Super Ferry	2016
NB0050	AP Marine Barge 02	Non-Propelled Dry Cargo Barge	2016
NB0049	AP Marine Barge 01	Non-Propelled Dry Cargo Barge	2016
NB0045 - HST0129	Normann	AHTS / Ice Breaker	2016
NB0036	Ocean Mermaid	Seismic Service Vessel	2016
NB0040 - HST0126	Fafnir Viking	PSV	2015
NB0035	Ocean Fortune	Seismic Service Vessel	2015
NB0039 - HST0124	Namsos	Live Fish Carrier	2015
NB0038 - HST0122	Ajieyt	AHTS / Ice Breaker	2015
NB0037 - HST0121	Smaragd	Purse Seiner Trawler	2015
NB0034 - HST0119	Esvagt Faraday	SOV	2014
NB0033 - HST0118	Esvagt Froude	SOV	2014
NB0025	Østerbris	Purse Seiner Trawler	2014
NB0032 - HST0116	Olympus	PSV	2014
NB0031 - HST0115	African Inspiration	OSV	2014
NB0030 - HST0120	Polarsyssel	PSV	2014
NB0029 - HST0117	Stormy	Live Fish Carrier	2013
NB0028 - HST0114	Lewek Inspector	OSV	2013
NB0022	Helene H 2	Bulk Carrier	2013
NB0027 - HST0113	Makalu	PSV	2012
NB0026 - HST0111	Kongsborg	PSV	2012
NB0021	Martin H.	Bulk Carrier	2012
NB0024 - HST0112	Ben Nevis	PSV	2012
NB0023 - HST0107	Havila Charisma	PSV	2012
NB0020 - HST0110	Vestland Mira	PSV	2012
NB0019 - HST0109	Torsborg	PSV	2011
NB0018 - HST0106	Sjoborg	PSV	2011
NB0017 - HST0103	Ocean Pride	PSV	2011
NB0016 - HST0102	Seaborg	PSV	2011
NB0015 - HST0090	Artus	Purse Seiner	2010
NB0014 - HST0101	Havila Subsea	OSV	2010
NB0013 - HST0105	Beaucephalus	PSV	2010
NB0012 - HST0088	Seven Havila	Subsea Vessel	2009
NB0011 - HST0100	Havila Jupiter	AHTS	2009
NB0010 - HST1684	Sjoborg	PSV	2009
NB0009 - HST0099	Havila Venus	AHTS	2008
NB0008 - HST1680	Eldborg	PSV	2008
NB0007 - HST0098	Stril Challenger	AHTS	2008
NB0006 - HST0093	Stril Commander	AHTS	2008
NB0005 - HST0095	Sea Lion	AHTS	2008
NB0004 - HST0094	Havila Neptune	AHTS	2007
NB0003 - HST0092	Havila Saturn	AHTS	2007
NB0002 - HST0086	Havila Mercury	AHTS	2007
NB0001 - HST0085	Havila Mars	AHTS	2006
