= Tarbert, Harris =

Coordinates: 57.899°N 6.808°W

Tarbert: Scottish Gaelic: An Tairbeart
- Town
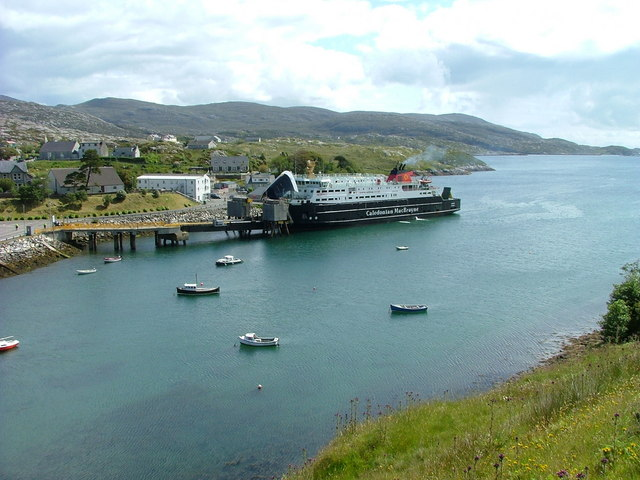
- The MV Hebrides at Tarbert pier

- Location within the Outer Hebrides Tarbert (Outer Hebrides)
- Population: 503 (1981)
- Demonym: Tairbeartach
- Language: Scottish Gaelic; English
- OS grid reference: NG154999
  - Edinburgh: 191 mi (307 km)
  - London: 515 mi (829 km)
- Civil parish: Harris
- Council area: Na h-Eileanan Siar
- Lieutenancy area: Western Isles
- Country: Scotland
- Sovereign state: United Kingdom
- Post town: ISLE OF HARRIS
- Postcode district: HS3
- Dialling code: 01859
- Police: Scotland
- Fire: Scottish
- Ambulance: Scottish
- UK Parliament: Na h-Eileanan an Iar
- Scottish Parliament: Na h-Eileanan an Iar

Tarbert (Note: Scottish Gaelic: An Tairbeart [ən̪ˠ ˈt̪ɛrʲɛbərˠʃt̪]) is the main community on Harris in the Western Isles of Scotland. The name means "isthmus", "crossing point" or "portage", in Gaelic. The isthmus, between the sea lochs West Loch Tarbert and East Loch Tarbert, joins south Harris to north Harris and Lewis. In 1981 it had a population of 503.

Tarbert's Church of Scotland parish church was built in 1862, and is within the parish of Harris. Tarbert also has a Free Presbyterian church. The Very Rev Mackintosh MacKay was minister of the latter in the 1860s.

== Transport ==
Tarbert has a car ferry terminal which operates to Uig on Skye. The short A868 joins the terminal to the north–south A859 road.

Preceding station	Caledonian MacBrayne	Following station
Terminus	Harris ferry	Uig Terminus

== Economy ==
The Harris distillery, a Scotch whisky and Gin distillery is located in Tarbert.

The Harris Hotel is a well established hostelry in Tarbert. Originally known as the Tarbert Hotel after being built in 1865 by the 7th Earl of Dunmore as a 'sporting retreat' for anglers, the hotel has been in the hands of the same family since the early 1900s. J.M. Barrie, on his way to the estate of Amhuinnsuidhe in 1912, spent time at the hotel and engraved his signature in a dining room window.
