= MV Sound of Scalpay =

History

United Kingdom
- Name: Sound of Scalpay
- Namesake: Sound adjacent to Scalpay in the Outer Hebrides
- Operator: Western Ferries
- Route: Gourock to Dunoon
- Builder: Cammell Laird, Birkenhead
- Laid down: November 2025
- Status: Under construction

General characteristics
- Class & type: Passenger/vehicle roll-on/roll-off ferry
- Length: 49.95 m (163 ft 11 in)
- Ramps: 2
- Capacity: 220 passengers 40 cars

MV Sound of Scalpay is a car and passenger ferry, currently being constructed for Western Ferries. When built, the vessel will operate on the upper Clyde between Gourock and Dunoon, Scotland.

== History ==
The keel for Sound of Scalpay was laid down in November 2025 at Cammell Laird of Birkenhead, as part of a deal that will see two vessels built for Western Ferries. Both Sound of Scalpay and her sister ship, Sound of Sleat, are intended to be ready for delivery in autumn 2026.

The ferry takes its name from an earlier Western Ferries vessel, that sailed under their flag from 1995 to 2013.

== Layout ==
Sound of Scalpay uses an updated design based upon that used by Western Ferries' Sound of Seil and Sound of Soay. These earlier vessels have a single car deck with 194 lane-metres between bow and stern ramps, with a passenger lounge. The original designs have been improved to reduce fuel consumption and increase the efficiency of operation.

== Service ==
When in service, the vessel will operate Western Ferries' Clyde service between McInroy's Point (Gourock) and Hunters Quay (Dunoon). This 2.2 nautical mile crossing allows vehicles to avoid the A83 "Rest and be thankful".
