= Dun Skeig =

Oval Iron Age dun (fort) complex in Kintyre, Argyll and Bute, Scotland

Coordinates: 55°45′24″N 5°34′29″W

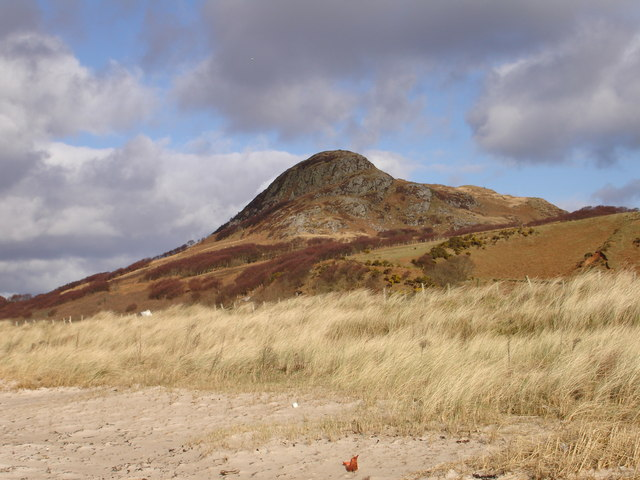
Dun Skeig viewed from the south

Dun Skeig is an oval Iron Age dun (fort) complex which is perched atop a rocky outcropping about 130 metres (430 ft) above sea level overlooking West Loch Tarbert in Kintyre, Argyll and Bute, Scotland, about 1 kilometre (0.62 mi) northwest of the village of Clachan.

The dun site includes a collection of prehistoric buildings and evidence of human habitation. Most notable of the buildings on the site are a rocky Iron Age fort and a vitrified fort that has been grown over with ground vegetation. The Iron Age fort measures about 14 metres (46 ft) in diameter with an outer wall of 4 metres (13 ft) thick and has a single entrance.

The moderately challenging climb to the peak and the views of the surrounding landscape that the vantage point offers make it clear why the site was selected as a defensive position.

== Other nearby prehistoric sites ==
Other nearby sites on the Kintyre Peninsula include:

- Avinagillan Standing Stone
- Ballochroy Standing Stones
- Corriechrevie Cairn.
