= MV Lochiel =

History

United Kingdom
- Name: MV Lochiel IV; 1970: Norwest Laird; 1978: "Old Lochiel"
- Namesake: "Lochiel" (Chiefs of Clan Cameron)
- Operator: David MacBrayne Ltd
- Port of registry: Glasgow, United Kingdom
- Route: Islay mailboat
- Builder: William Denny and Brothers of Dumbarton
- Cost: £62,805
- Yard number: 1341
- Launched: 4 April 1939
- Identification: Official Number: 165966; Callsign:
- Fate: Sold 1970; Scrapped 1995

General characteristics
- Tonnage: 577 GRT
- Length: 55.95 m (183 ft 7 in)
- Beam: 9.78 m (32 ft 1 in)
- Draught: 2.31 m (7 ft 7 in)
- Installed power: 2 x 8-cylinder, 4-stroke, 880 bhp Paxman-Ricardo diesel engines
- Propulsion: twin 3-blade propellers
- Speed: 12 knots (14 max)
- Capacity: 599 passengers

MV Lochiel was the Islay mailboat operated by David MacBrayne Ltd from 1939 until 1970. Sinking in West Loch Tarbert in 1960, she was refloated and repaired. She became MacBrayne's last surviving mailboat, seeing out her life as a floating bar in Bristol. Her sinking was the cause behind a leading Scottish contract law case McCutcheon v David MacBrayne Ltd.

== History ==
Lochiel was the first of two mailboats ordered in 1938; the second, Loch Seaforth was delayed until 1947. Built in 1939, she was the fourth MacBrayne's vessel named Lochiel. The earlier Lochiels had been single-screw steamers, two serving Islay.

On 8 October 1960, Lochiel hit submerged rocks in West Loch Tarbert, Argyll and sank. She was raised by the salvage-tug Plantagenet, and was out of service until the following March. Liability for a car lost on this crossing was challenged in the courts, and decided in favour of the car owner by the House of Lords.

When replaced as the Islay mailboat in 1970, she was sold to Norwest Shipping Ltd, Douglas, Isle of Man. Re-fitted on the Mersey, she emerging as Norwest Laird and had a short career operating between Fleetwood and Douglas. The service was not a success and her operator went bankrupt in August 1970. Late in 1974, she was acquired by Courage (Western) Ltd and was towed to Hayle in Cornwall, to be renovated for use as a floating bar and restaurant in Bristol. Her engines were removed in 1975, but it was 1978 before she reached Bristol. As "Old Lochiel", she became a popular haunt and survived until 1994. In November 1995, she was sold for scrap and broken up at Bristol that December.

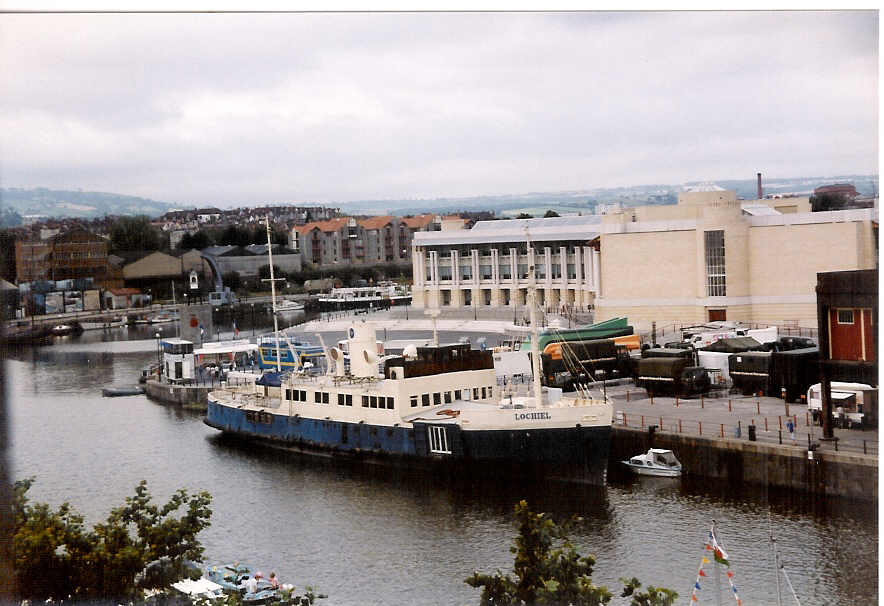
In Bristol, as a floating pub.

== Layout ==
Lochiel had a single funnel, a steel mast and a derrick over the forward cargo-hold. An innovation for MacBrayne's was a cold store on the lower deck. A clear area of plated main-deck forward allowed carriage of cars or cattle. Her deck was strengthened to take a 4-inch gun. Her accommodation originally had two-classes, with the usual lounges, dining saloons and smoke-rooms. Officers cabins were on the lower deck, with the crew quarters in the forecastle at main-deck level. To cope with the shallow West Loch Tarbert, she was flat bottomed, resulting in much pitching and rolling in even slight seas.

All her deck machinery was electrically powered. Her engines were flexibly mounted, to reduce vibration and noise. Oil-operated reverse reduction gearboxes were fitted, rather than an additional, heavy reversing engine. She was given a mainmast in 1953.

== Service ==
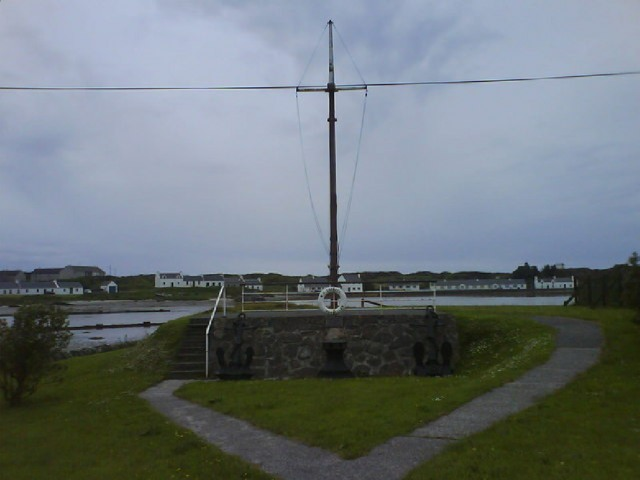
MV Lochiel memorial garden, Port Ellen

Although built for the Islay service, Lochiel started her career at Oban on the secondary Fort William schedule, until the pier at West Loch Tarbert was modified for her length and draught. Thereafter, she replaced PS Pioneer and spent her entire career on the Islay service. She called at Port Askaig and Port Ellen, and also served Jura (Craighouse) and Gigha (by flit-boat). She was not requisitioned in World War II. In 1949, her schedule was extended to include regular runs to Colonsay.

Derrick-loading continued at Islay, after the 1964 hoist-loading ferries joined the fleet. This was increasingly inconvenient and provided an opening for Western Ferries to operate an Islay service from Kennacraig. In January 1970, the 1954 former Clyde car ferry MV Arran took over the MacBrayne Islay service and Lochiel was retired.
