= Ceann na Creige =

Ceann na Creige is a Scottish Gaelic placename. It can refer to:

- Kennacraig, a hamlet on the Kintyre peninsula
- Eilean Ceann na Creige, a small island near Kennacraig
- Kincraig, a village between Kingussie and Aviemore
