= MV Sound of Seil =

Scottish car and passenger ferry

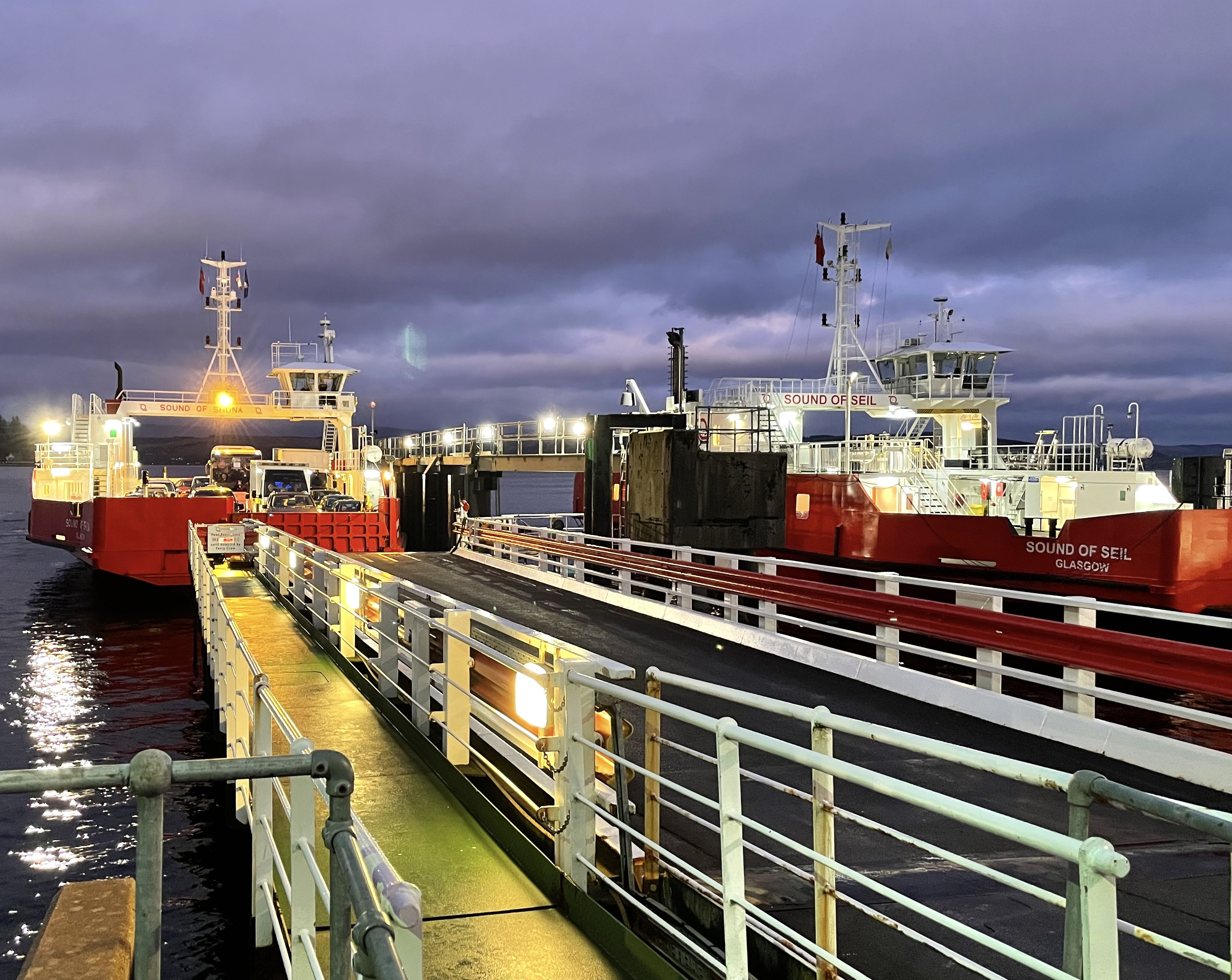
- MV Sound of Shuna and MV Sound of Seil at Hunters Quay

History

United Kingdom
- Name: Sound of Seil
- Namesake: Sound adjacent to Seil in the Slate Islands
- Operator: Western Ferries
- Route: Gourock to Dunoon
- Builder: Cammell Laird, Birkenhead
- Cost: estimated £4 million
- Yard number: 1387
- Laid down: 18 October 2012
- Launched: 25 July 2013
- In service: October 2013
- Identification: IMO number: 9665217; Callsign: 2GWI2; MMSI number: 235101062
- Status: in service

General characteristics
- Class & type: Passenger/vehicle roll-on/roll-off ferry
- Tonnage: 225 DWT 497 GT
- Length: 49.95 m (163 ft 11 in)
- Beam: 15 m (49 ft 3 in)
- Draught: 2.5 m (8 ft 2 in)
- Ramps: 2
- Installed power: 2 x Cummins QSK19M 600 bhp (450 kW) at 1800 rpm
- Propulsion: 2 x Rolls-Royce Aquamaster azimuthing thrusters
- Speed: 12 kt
- Capacity: 220 passengers 40 cars

Sound of Seil is a car and passenger ferry, operated by Western Ferries on the upper Clyde between Gourock and Dunoon, Scotland.

== History ==
Sound of Seil was built by Cammell Laird of Birkenhead. She was launched into the River Mersey by crane on 25 July 2013. After fitting out, she entered service in October 2013, replacing the smaller and slower MV Sound of Sanda and MV Sound of Scalpay.

== Layout ==
Sound of Seil and her sister, MV Sound of Soay were a development of the design of the earlier fleet members. They have a single car deck with 194 lane-metres between bow and stern ramps. There is a passenger lounge. The ferries use LED lighting and enhanced heat recovery.

== Service ==
Along with up to three other vessels, Sound of Seil operates Western Ferries' Clyde service between McInroy's Point (Gourock) and Hunters Quay (Dunoon). This 2.2 nautical miles (4.1 km; 2.5 mi) crossing allows vehicles to avoid the A83 "Rest and be thankful".
