= MV Sound of Gigha =

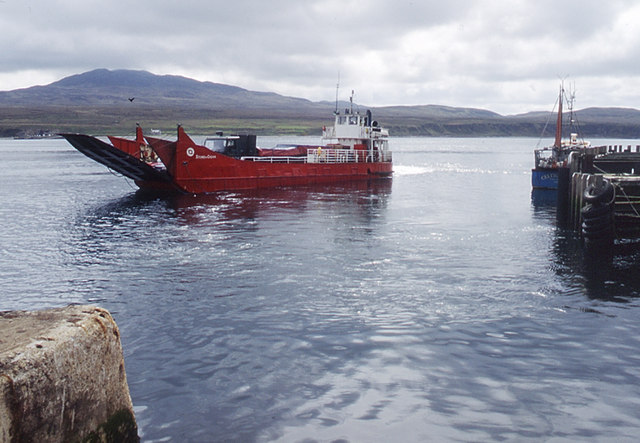
- MV Sound of Gigha at Port Askaig

History

United Kingdom
- Name: MV Isle of Gigha; MV Sound of Gigha
- Namesake: Gigha
- Owner: 1966: Eilean Sea Services; Western Ferries
- Route: Jura ferry
- Builder: Thames Launch Works / Bideford Shipyard
- In service: 1966, 1969–1998

General characteristics
- Class & type: Roll-on/roll-off vehicle ferry

MV Sound of Gigha was a pioneering roll-on/roll-off (ro-ro) ferry operating on the west coast of Scotland. She was launched as Isle of Gigha in May 1966. On 11 November 1966, she capsized off Islay. Salvaged, overhauled, and renamed, she provided thirty years of service between Islay and Jura.

== History ==
Oban civil engineer and merchant seaman John Rose and Gavin Hamilton, a Lanarkshire landscape gardener recognised that the future of inter-island ferry trade was for freight to be carried by lorries loaded onto a ro-ro ship. This was not being developed by Caledonian MacBrayne. The pair obtained a grant from the Highlands and Islands Development Board and ordered a landing craft type ferry from the Thames Launch Works, who subcontracted work to Bideford Shipyard. In February 1966, with Chris Pollock, an Argyll businessman, they formed Eilean Sea Services.

Building progressed rapidly. The ferry was launched as Isle of Gigha and handed over to the owners in May 1966, despite problems with the performance and stability trials. She completed her delivery voyage from Bideford to Loch Sween without event. In service, beach landings, sometimes in gale-force winds, took a heavy toll on the hull, resulting in shell fractures and jamming of the port rudder. Water leaked into the after-peak and the engine room.

=== Capsize ===
On the morning of 11 November 1966, Isle of Gigha was en route from Gigha to Port Ellen, loaded with commercial vehicles. Rolling in a moderate sea, a rudder stock cracked making steering difficult. Unsecured loads shifted, causing the ferry to list and capsize. MV Lochiel, HMS Murray, and the Islay lifeboat took part in the rescue, but three men were lost. That afternoon, Admiralty salvage vessel Succour secured a tow. The righted casualty was taken to Greenock.

Realising that the future safety of such roll-on/roll-off ferries depended on identifying the causes of the accident, Board of Trade Inspector, Walter Weyndling, mounted a newspaper campaign to hold a Court of Inquiry. The Inquiry was held and blamed the master, Gordon Graham, for not securing the vehicles. The managers of the Eilean Sea Services and the contractors escaped.

The salvaged vessel was returned to Eilean Sea Services. John Rose had formed Western Ferries with investment from many commercial interests in Islay and Jura. They bought the Isle of Gigha and had additional buoyancy fitted at overhaul, increasing her range of stability. She re-emerged as Sound of Gigha.

== Layout ==
Isle of Gigha was an 80-foot (24-metre) landing craft – a square pontoon with shaped bow and stern.

== Service ==
Isle of Gigha arrived in the middle of the nationwide seamen's strike and quickly found herself busy running emergency supplies to the islands. In the summer of 1966 she operated mainly between West Loch Tarbert or Tayinloan and Gigha or Islay.

The refurbished Sound of Gigha operated to the nearer Western Isles, until the larger Sound of Islay was built at Ferguson Brothers in Port Glasgow. She then provided the ferry service between Islay and Jura from March 1969 until July 1998. During this time, Arthur MacEachern was skipper of the Jura ferry, continuing on the replacement vessel, MV Eilean Dhiura until he retired in 2005.
