= Lillico =

Lillico may refer to:

- Alexander Lillico (1872–1966), Tasmanian politician
- Elliot Lillico (1905–1994), Australian politician
- Lillico, Tasmania, a suburb of the City of Devonport
- Lillico Beach Conservation Area, a protected area of Tasmania, Australia

== See also ==
- Henry Kendall Ltd v William Lillico Ltd, a 1969 English contract law case
