= MV Sound of Jura =

Ferry (1969–2005)

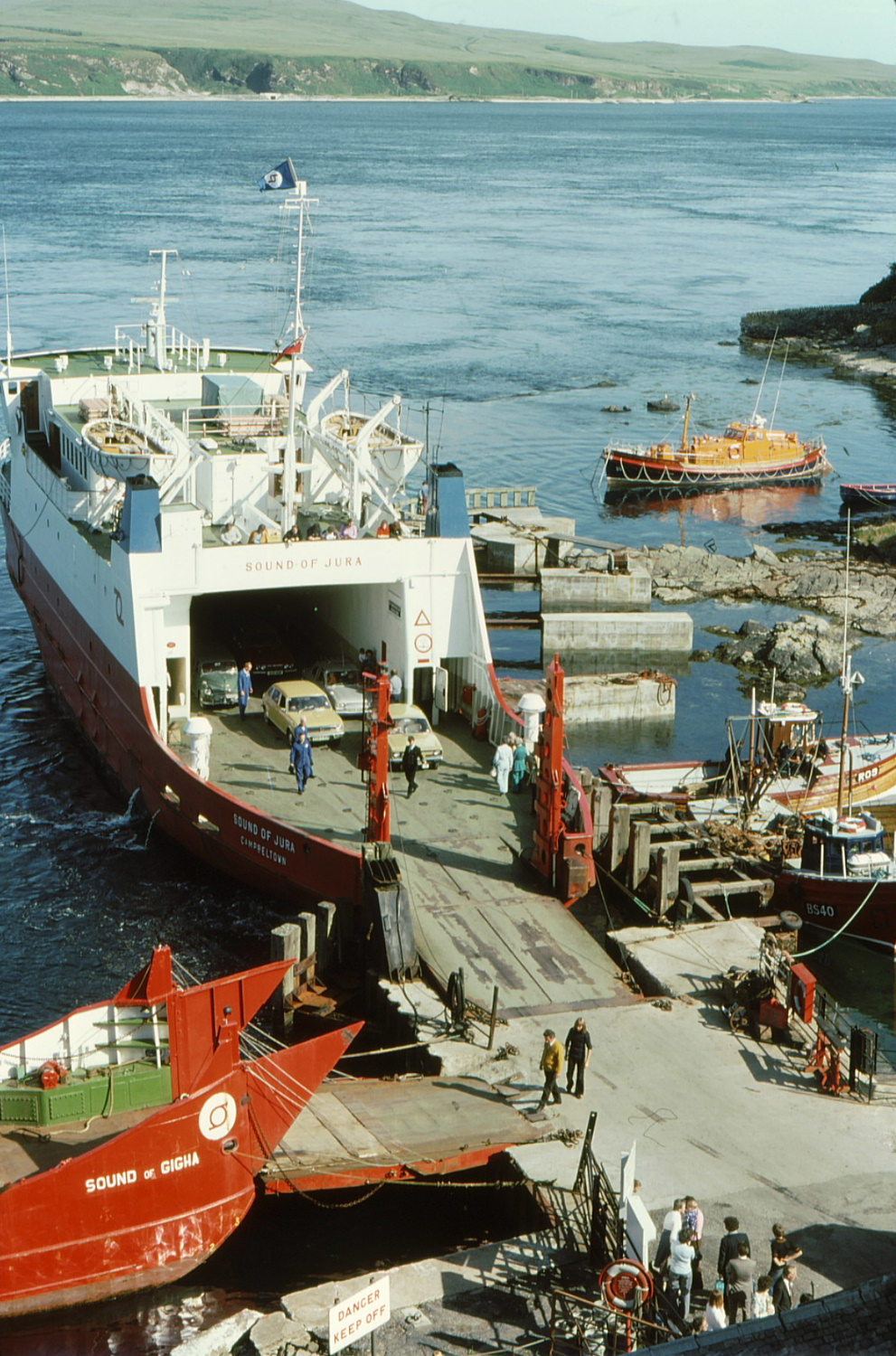
- MV Sound of Jura, unloading at Port Askaig

History

United Kingdom
- Name: Sound of Jura; Quintana Roo
- Namesake: Sound of Jura; Quintana Roo
- Owner: Western Ferries, Glasgow; 1976: Mexican Government
- Route: 1969–1976: Islay; 1976–2005: Cozumel
- Builder: Hatlø Verksted A/S, Ulsteinvik, Norway
- Cost: £315,000
- Yard number: 39
- Launched: 1969
- In service: 1 August 1969
- Identification: IMO number: 6920068; Call sign: XC2046
- Fate: Swept onto beach by Hurricane Wilma on 19 October 2005

General characteristics
- Type: Roll-on/roll-off passenger car ferry
- Tonnage: 553 GRT; 235 NRT; 219 long tons deadweight (DWT)
- Length: 49.36 m (161.9 ft)
- Beam: 11.33 m (37.2 ft)
- Draught: 2.45 m (8 ft 0.5 in)
- Installed power: 2x 8-cyl, Blackstone diesels (1,470 kW (1,970 hp))
- Speed: 14 kn (26 km/h)
- Capacity: 36 cars; 250 Passengers (74 in winter)
- Crew: 6

MV Sound of Jura was the first drive-through car ferry on the west coast of Scotland. It was operated by Western Ferries on the Islay service from Kennacraig between 1969 and 1976. The Mexican Government operated it to Cozumel as Quintana Roo until 2005, when it was wrecked by Hurricane Wilma.

== History ==
Western Ferries had introduced MV Sound of Islay, a drive-on, drive-off ferry on the Islay crossing in 1968 in competition with MacBraynes. She was so successful that they ordered a larger vessel with superior passenger accommodation. Built in Norway, Sound of Jura took up the service on 1 August 1969.

MacBraynes responded by ordering MV Iona, but when no suitable mainland pier could be found, they moved hoist-loading MV Arran to the service. Western Ferries were unable to compete with this subsidised service and began to lose traffic. Stern-loading MV Pioneer replaced Arran in August 1974. Western Ferries protested against the subsidy to their competitor on the route. Estimating that this was equal to their own total running costs, they ran a free return crossing on 13 June 1975. Sound of Jura survived on the route until 1976, when Western Ferries sold her, with Sound of Islay returning to their Islay service until 1981.

In September 1976, Sound of Jura was sold to the Mexican Government and renamed Quintana Roo. She was swept ashore on the beach at Puerto Morelos during Hurricane Wilma on 19 October 2005.

== Layout ==
Bow and stern ramps allowed drive-through operation, although initially she only used the stern ramp.

== Service ==
Sound of Jura took over the Kennacraig to Port Askaig service from Sound of Islay in 1969. She was capable of three trips a day, leaving Kennacraig at 06.00, 11.00 and 16.00. The excursion fare for a car was £5.00 return.

In Mexico, Quintana Roo opened up a new car ferry route between Puerto Morelos, on the Yucatán Peninsula and the island of Cozumel.
