= MV Sound of Islay =

Ferry built in 1968

History

United Kingdom
- Name: Sound of Islay
- Namesake: Islay
- Owner: Western Ferries, Glasgow (1969 - 1980); Government of Newfoundland and Labrador (1980 - present)
- Port of registry: Campbeltown (1970 - 1980); St. John's, Newfoundland and Labrador (1980 - present)
- Route: Islay; Campbeltown to Red Bay, County Antrim
- Builder: Ferguson Shipbuilders, Port Glasgow; Engine builder: Bergius-Kelvin, Glasgow
- Cost: £168,500
- Yard number: 452
- Launched: 27 February 1968
- Maiden voyage: 7 April 1968
- Identification: IMO number: 6810926; MMSI number: 316001217; Callsign: VY4372
- Status: In service

General characteristics
- Type: Roll-on/roll-off passenger car ferry
- Tonnage: 280 GRT; 135 NRT
- Length: 142.4 ft (43.4 m)
- Beam: 31.25 ft (9.5 m)
- Draught: 5.15 ft (1.6 m)
- Installed power: 2 x oil 4SA 8cy sr reverse geared Bergius-Kelvin TA8; 380 bhp each at 1200 rpm
- Propulsion: Twin screws and a bow thrust unit
- Speed: 10.75 knots (19.91 km/h; 12.37 mph)
- Capacity: 20 cars or 6 lorries; 93 Passengers
- Crew: 5

MV Sound of Islay was a stern loading ro-ro ferry on the west coast of Scotland. Built for Western Ferries in 1968, she served Islay and later Campbeltown – Red Bay (Northern Ireland). In 1981, she was sold to the Government of Newfoundland and Labrador and still operates in eastern Canada.

== History ==
In the late 1960s, the private company, Western Ferries (Argyll) Ltd - forerunner to the newer Western Ferries (Clyde) Ltd - commissioned Sound of Islay from Ferguson Brothers of Port Glasgow. She was to be the first ro-ro ferry on the west coast of Scotland. Designed to carry 20 cars or a combination of cars and commercial vehicles on the Islay run from Kennacraig, West Loch Tarbert, she proved so popular that the state-owned MacBrayne's upgraded their own services to ro-ro. Western Ferries purchased a larger ferry, the Norwegian-built MV Sound of Jura, but were unable to compete with the subsidised service and started to lose traffic.

In September 1981, Sound of Islay was sold to the Government of Newfoundland and Labrador. Between May 2007 and January 2008, she underwent an extensive refit in Clarenville.

== Layout ==
Sound of Islay has a stern ramp and an open car deck aft. There are two small saloons for passengers.

== Service ==
Sound of Islay provided a new roll-on/roll-off between Kennacraig in West Loch Tarbert and Port Askaig on Islay. She also made a daily call in each directions at a new link-span at the north end of Gigha until it was destroyed in a storm in January 1972. The service was punctual and an immediate success, soon requiring a larger vessel, Sound of Jura.

In May 1970, Sound of Islay commenced the Campbeltown (Kintyre) – Red Bay (Northern Ireland) service. Initial success was helped by a cement strike in Ireland and a dock strike in England. The summer-only service was daily (twice at weekends). Attempts to keep up a winter service, primarily with timber, were unsuccessful. The ship continued to operate a summer service until 1973 and spent the winter on charter. She acted as relief vessel to Islay when Sound of Jura was in drydock. In 1976, Sound of Jura was sold and Sound of Islay returned to the Islay service until 1981.

In eastern Canada since 1981, Sound of Islay has served various routes, including the Little Bay Islands in Notre Dame Bay and the St. Brendan's ferry. She is not built to withstand ice and has latterly acted as a relief vessel in a fleet with many ageing vessels.
