= McCutcheon v David MacBrayne Ltd =

Scottish and English contract law case

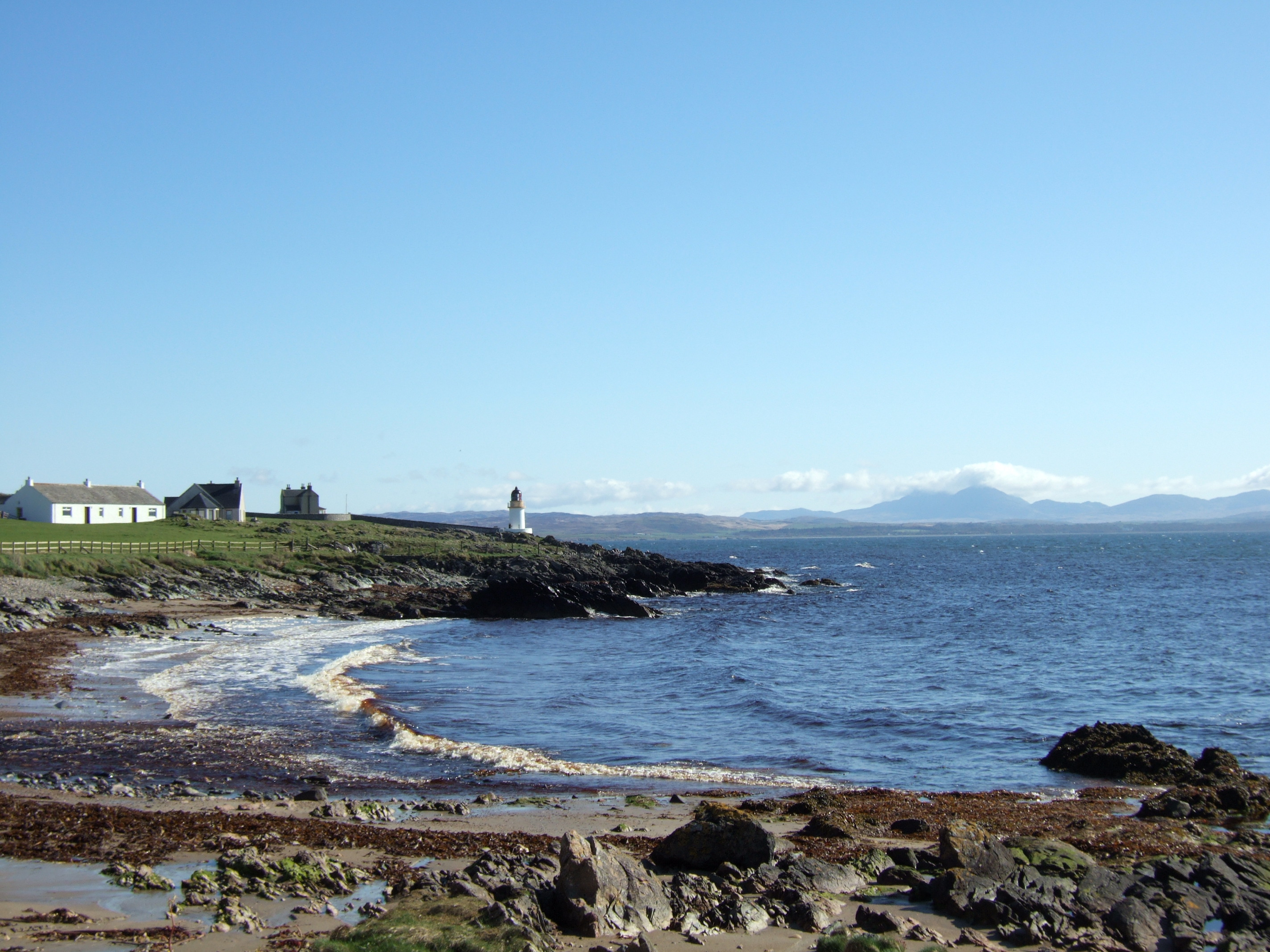
- Isle of Islay
- Court: House of Lords
- Full case name: McCUTCHEON (A. P.) v DAVID MACBRAYNE LIMITED
- Decided: 21 January 1964
- Citations: [1964] UKHL 4, [1964] 1 WLR 125

Court membership
- Judges sitting: Lord Reid, Lord Hodson, Lord Guest, Lord Devlin, Lord Pearce

Case opinions
- Lord Reid, Lord Devlin, Lord Pearce

Keywords
- Contract term, incorporation

McCutcheon v David MacBrayne Ltd [1964] 1 WLR 125 is a leading Scottish contract law case, concerning the incorporation of a term in a contract through a 'common course of dealings' (ie, consistent).

== Facts ==
On 8 October 1960 the MV Lochiel, a ferry operated by David MacBrayne Ltd, struck rocks and sunk between Islay and the mainland resulting in the loss of McCutcheon's car. Usually David MacBrayne Ltd would have asked its customers to sign a risk note which included conditions for accepting goods for carriage that exempted the company from liability for loss of the goods. The claimant's brother-in-law (Mr. McSporran) had made the shipping arrangements, and he did not sign a risk note. McCutcheon had signed a risk note on four occasions in the past and McSporran had also done so on occasion. Both said they knew notes contained conditions but not what the conditions were. David MacBrayne Ltd argued that even though it was not signed, the terms had been incorporated into their contract through a course of dealing.

== Judgment ==
The House of Lords held, reversing the decision of the Court of Session, that there was no regular course of dealing with McCutcheon and no consistent course of dealing with McSporran, and therefore David MacBrayne Ltd could not say that its term shifting the risk of an accident had been incorporated. Lord Reid explained that the term could not be incorporated through reasonable notice or a signature on this occasion alone, and went on.

The only other ground on which it would seem possible to import these conditions is that based on a course of dealing. If two parties have made a series of similar contracts each containing certain conditions, and then they make another without expressly referring to those conditions it may be that those conditions ought to be implied. If the officious bystander had asked them whether they had intended to leave out the conditions this time, both must, as honest men, have said "of course not". But again the facts here will not support that ground. According to Mr. McSporran, there had been no consistent course of dealing; sometimes he was asked to sign and sometimes not. And, moreover, he did not know what the conditions were. This time he was offered an oral contract without any reference to conditions, and he accepted the offer in good faith. The Respondents also rely on the Appellant's previous knowledge. I doubt whether it is possible to spell out a course of dealing in his case. In all but one of the previous cases he had been acting on behalf of his employer in sending a different kind of goods and he did not know that the Respondents always sought to insist on excluding liability for their own negligence. So it cannot be said that when he asked his agent to make a contract for him he knew that this or, indeed, any other special term would be included in it. He left his agent a free hand to contract, and I see nothing to prevent him from taking advantage of the contract which his agent in fact made. "The judicial task is not to discover the actual intentions of each party: it is to decide what each was reasonably entitled to conclude from the attitude of the other" (Gloag, Contract p. 7). In this case I do not think that either party was reasonably bound or entitled to conclude from the attitude of the other as known to him that these conditions were intended by the other party to be part of this contract. I would therefore allow the appeal and restore the interlocutor of the Lord Ordinary.

Lord Devlin came to the same conclusion but wished to impose a higher test. According to him actual knowledge would be necessary to incorporate terms.

Your Lordships were referred to the dictum of Blackburn, J. in Harris v Great Western Railway Company (1876) 1 QBD 515, at 530. The passage is as follows:-

"And it is clear law that where there is a writing, into which the terms of any agreement are reduced, the terms are to be regulated by that writing. And though one of the parties may not have read the writing, yet, in general, he is bound to the other by those terms; and that, I apprehend, is on the ground that, by assenting to the contract thus reduced to writing, he represents to the other side that he has made himself acquainted with the contents of that writing and assents to them, and so induces the other side to act upon that representation by entering into the contract with him, and is consequently precluded from denying that he did make himself acquainted with those terms. But then the preclusion only exists when the case is brought within the rule so carefully and accurately laid down by Parke, B., in delivering the judgment of the Exchequer in Freeman v Cooke, that is, if he ' means his representation to be acted upon, and it is acted upon accordingly: or if, whatever a man's real intentions may be, he so conduct himself that a reasonable man would take the representation to be true, and believe that it was meant that he should act upon it, and did act upon it as true."

If the ordinary law of estoppel was applicable to this case, it might well be argued that the circumstances leave no room for any representation by the sender on which the carrier acted. I believe that any other member of the public in Mr. McCutcheon's place,—and this goes for lawyers as well as for laymen,—would have found himself compelled to give the same sort of answers as Mr. McCutcheon gave; and I doubt if any carrier who serves out documents of this type could honestly say that he acted in the belief that the recipient had " made himself acquainted with the contents ". But Blackburn, J. was dealing with an unsigned document, a cloakroom ticket. Unless your Lordships are to disapprove the decision of the Court of Appeal in L'Estrange v Graucob [1934] 2 KB 394,—and there has been no suggestion in this case that you should,—the law is clear, without any recourse to the doctrine of estoppel, that a signature to a contract is conclusive.

This is a matter that is relevant to the way in which the Respondents put their case. They say that the previous dealings between themselves and the Appellant, being always on the terms of their " risk note ", as they call their written conditions, the contract between themselves and the Appellant must be deemed to import the same conditions. In my opinion, the bare fact that there have been previous dealings between the parties does not assist the Respondents at all. The fact that a man has made a contract in the same form ninety-nine times (let alone three or four times which are here alleged) will not of itself affect the hundredth contract in which the form is not used. Previous dealings are relevant only if they prove knowledge of the terms, actual and not constructive, and assent to them. If a term is not expressed in a contract, there is only one other way in which it can come into it and that is by implication. No implication can be made against a party of a term which was unknown to him. If previous dealings show that a man knew of and agreed to a term on ninety-nine occasions, there is a basis for saying that it can be imported into the hundredth contract without an express statement. It may or may not be sufficient to justify the importation,—that depends on the circumstances; but at least by proving knowledge the essential beginning is made. Without knowledge there is nothing...

If the Respondents had remembered to issue a risk note in this case, they would have invited your Lordships to give a curt answer to any complaint by the Appellant. He might say that the terms were unfair and unreasonable, that he had never voluntarily agreed to them, that it was impossible to read or understand them and that anyway if he had tried to negotiate any change the Respondents would not have listened to him. The Respondents would expect him to be told that he had made his contract and must abide by it. Now the boot is on the other foot. It is just as legitimate, but also just as vain, for the Respondents to say that it was only a slip on their part, that it is unfair and unreasonable of the Appellant to take advantage of it and that he knew perfectly well that they never carried goods except on conditions. The law must give the same answer: they must abide by the contract they made. What is sauce for the goose is sauce for the gander. It will remain unpalatable sauce for both animals until the legislature, if the courts cannot do it, intervenes to secure that when contracts are made in circumstances in which there is no scope for free negotiation of the terms, they are made upon terms that are clear, fair and reasonable and settled independently as such. That is what Parliament has done in the case of carriage of goods by rail and on the high seas.

Lord Pearce held that the course of dealings was not consistent, because previously risk notes were signed. A course of dealing must be regular and consistent.

== See also ==
- English contract law
- Henry Kendall Ltd v William Lillico Ltd [1969] 2 AC 31, rejected Lord Devlin's dictum that actual knowledge was necessary to prove before a term is incorporated
