= MV Lymington =

Former Isle of Wight and Western Ferries car and passenger ferry

History

United Kingdom
- Name: MV Lymington; MV Sound of Sanda
- Owner: 1938 Southern Railway Co; 1948 British Transport Commission; 1974 Western Ferries; 1993
- Port of registry: Campbeltown
- Route: 1938 – 1974: Lymington-Yarmouth; 1974 – 1993 Gourock (McInroy's Point) – Dunoon (Hunters Quay)
- Ordered: 23 March 1937
- Builder: William Denny and Brothers, Dumbarton
- Yard number: 1322
- Launched: 1 April 1938
- In service: 1 May 1938
- Identification: IMO number: 5215222

General characteristics
- Type: Passenger / Ro-Ro Cargo Vessel
- Tonnage: 403 GRT
- Length: 148 ft (45.1 m) overall
- Beam: 26.1 ft (8.0 m)
- Installed power: 2 x 4-stroke 6-cylinder W.H.Allen 6S30B oil engines, 200 bhp each at 530 rpm
- Propulsion: 2 Voith Schneider propellers fore & aft
- Speed: 11 knots
- Capacity: 516 passengers and 17 cars

MV Lymington is a former ro-ro ferry, built in 1938 to serve the Isle of Wight. She is Britain's earliest example of a Voith Schneider driven ferry. Renamed MV Sound of Sanda in 1974, she served Western Ferries on the Upper Clyde until 1993.

== History ==
MV Lymington was built in 1938 as an Isle of Wight ferry. She was the first British vessel driven by Voith Schneider propulsion units. Throughout the war, she was on the Lymington-Yarmouth service on the Solent. A slab of concrete placed above her wheelhouse offered some protection against an airborne attack.

By 1972, Lymington was too small for her owners' needs. The arrival of new ferries led to her being withdrawn and placed on the sale list. She was bought by Western Ferries for their new crossing from Hunter's Quay to McInroy's Point. Returning to the Clyde, she was modified to suit her new owner's needs and renamed Sound of Sanda. She served Western Ferries faithfully from late August 1974 until 1989, latterly being relegated to carrying cement tankers to Faslane while the new Trident submarine base was under construction. She had served Western Ferries well – but no longer had a viable role in the fleet due to her age and small capacity.

Britain's earliest example of a VSP driven ferry, Sound of Sanda failed to attract a suitable home for preservation. Efforts by a group of southern enthusiasts, the 'Lymington Preservation Society' failed to find money and somewhere for the vessel. Western Ferries were very aware of the vessel's significance and offered her to the Scottish Maritime Museum at Irvine. Again, there was neither money nor a secure berth and they were forced to place her on the open market.

Sound of Sanda lay for a number of years in Holy Loch, on a mooring belonging to Western Ferries and was eventually sold to Donald Harper of Oban for use as a fish farm support vessel. She left the Clyde in March 1994 and was deliberately beached at Taynuilt on the shore of Loch Etive, to allow work to be carried out. After some time, with much of her structure cut away, Argyll and Bute Council decided that the vessel had been abandoned, and stripped out her machinery. Her main engines were taken to Greenock by lorry, travelling aboard Sound of Sleat. Over a couple of months, she was reduced to a hulk, which was re-floated and left to rot at a mooring in the loch.

Western Ferries also named a later vessel MV Sound of Sanda.

== Layout ==
The single car deck had ramps at each end.

The novel Voith Schneider propellers proved very successful, allowing the ship to turn in her own length.

== Service ==
- Lymington-Yarmouth, Isle of Wight
- Gourock (McInroy's Point) – Dunoon (Hunters Quay)

== See also ==
- List of ships built by William Denny and Brothers
