= MV Sound of Scarba =

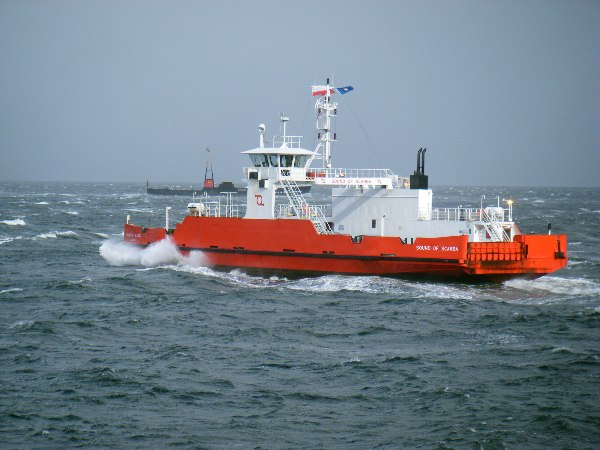
- After leaving McInroy’s Point terminal, near Gourock (2009)

History

United Kingdom
- Name: MV Sound of Scarba
- Operator: Western Ferries
- Route: Gourock to Dunoon
- Builder: Ferguson Shipbuilders, Port Glasgow, Scotland
- Yard number: 710
- Acquired: 2001
- Identification: IMO number: 9237424; Callsign: ZNGH7; MMSI number: 235001902
- Status: in service

General characteristics
- Class & type: Passenger/vehicle ferry
- Type: roll-on/roll-off ferry
- Tonnage: 211 DWT
- Length: 50 m (164.0 ft)
- Beam: 15 m (49.2 ft)
- Draught: 2.5 m
- Ramps: 2
- Installed power: Cummins KTA19M3
- Propulsion: CRP units, by Rolls-Royce Aquamaster
- Capacity: Cars: 45
- Crew: 4

MV Sound of Scarba is a car and passenger ferry, operated by Western Ferries on the River Clyde between Gourock and Dunoon, Scotland

== History ==
Sound of Scarba was built by Ferguson Shipbuilders of Port Glasgow, Scotland at a reported cost of £2.5 million. She was launched on 12 March 2001 by employee Laura Meade and entered service on 4 May 2001.

== Layout ==
Sound of Scarba has a single car deck with bow and stern ramps, and a passenger lounge.

== Service ==
Sound of Scarba operates Western Ferries' Clyde service between McInroy's Point (Gourock) and Hunters Quay (Dunoon).
