= Eilean Ceann na Creige =

Island in West Loch Tarbert, Scotland

Eilean Ceann na Creige (Gaelic)

Location
- Eilean Ceann na Creige shown within Argyll and Bute
- OS grid reference: NR818626
- Coordinates: 55.81°N 5.48°W

Name
- Name meaning: head of the rock

Physical geography
- Island group: West Loch Tarbert, Argyll
- Area: 6 ha (15 acres)
- Highest elevation: 10 m (33 ft)

Administration
- Council area: Argyll and Bute
- Country: Scotland
- Sovereign state: United Kingdom

Demographics
- Population: 0

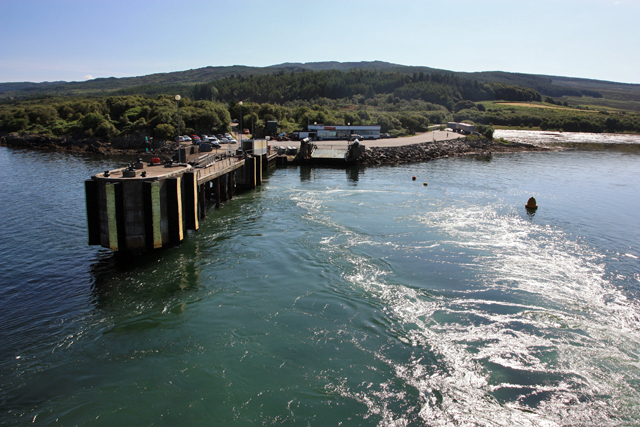
Kennacraig Ferry Terminal on Eilean Ceann na Creige

Eilean Ceann na Creige is a small island near Kennacraig in West Loch Tarbert in Scotland. Ceann na Creige is Gaelic for head of the rock.

Eilean Ceann na Creige is connected to Kennacraig by a causeway. It is the mainland terminal of the ferry to Islay, Jura and Colonsay.

== Gallery ==
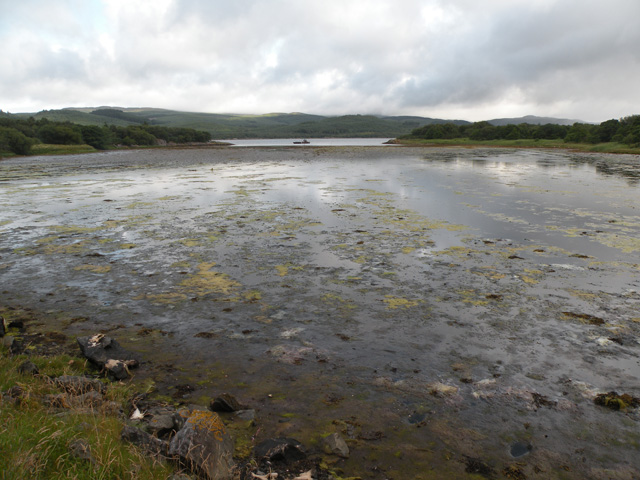
Inlet east of Eilean Ceann na Creige.

== See also ==
- Kintyre Peninsula
