= Western Ferries =

Passenger and vehicle ferry company in Scotland

Western Ferries (Clyde) Ltd

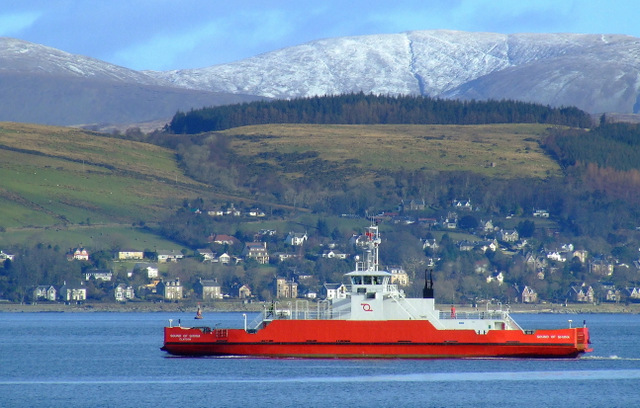
- Sound of Shuna ferry at Gourock
- Type: Private
- Industry: Transport
- Founded: 1968 Western Ferries; 1985 Western Ferries (Clyde) Ltd.
- Headquarters: Hunters Quay, Scotland, UK
- Area served: Firth of Clyde
- Services: Ferries
- Website: www.western-ferries.co.uk

Western Ferries (Clyde) Ltd (also known as Western Ferries) is a private ferry company with its headquarters in Hunters Quay, Scotland. It currently operates on the Firth of Clyde running a year-round, high-frequency vehicle carrying service between Hunters Quay, near Dunoon, and McInroy's Point, on the outskirts of Gourock in Inverclyde.

== History ==
Western Ferries route map

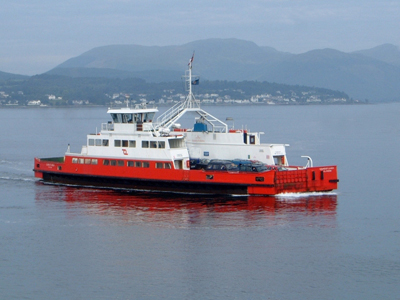
MV Sound of Sanda

House flag used by Western Ferries

In the mid-1960s the islands on the west coast of Scotland were served by two kinds of vessel; mail ferries operated by David MacBrayne Ltd and "puffers" – small bulk cargo vessels capable of landing at simple piers or on the beach to discharge coal, lime etc. MacBrayne's also operated cargo vessels out of Glasgow. None of these vessels was equipped to deal with road transport. Three car ferries operated by MacBrayne's were all side-loading and not suited to carrying the sharply increasing growth in tourist traffic or commercial vehicles.

In 1966 three people engaged in contracting work on the west coast decided to set up the Eileann Sea Service. With the help of an HIDB loan a landing craft type vessel, Isle of Gigha was constructed and started operation in the middle of the seaman's strike. But in November the ship capsized and this put the company in financial difficulty. If anything further were to happen, more money and technical back-up would be needed.

A group of Scottish businessmen having special interest in shipping and haulage matters, many of whom also had local interest in Islay and Jura, subscribed £100,000 capital and Western Ferries was set up.

=== Islay service ===
Sound of Islay was ordered from Ferguson Brothers (Port Glasgow) Ltd. of Port Glasgow. She was designed to carry 20 cars or a combination of cars and commercial vehicles. She was launched amid a storm of derision. Trading began on 7 April 1968 between Kennacraig, West Loch Tarbert, and Islay.

Sound of Jura was ordered from Norway. She came into operation in 1969 with three sailings a day. The capital of the company was increased to £250,000.

At the beginning of 1969 the Port Askaig (Islay) – Feolin (Jura) service began – a high frequency service across a short stretch of water with a landing craft type vessel (the Isle of Gigha now modified and renamed Sound of Gigha, capable of carrying the largest commercial vehicle permitted on the road, or six cars). This effectively joined Islay and Jura and increased the traffic to the mainland. Jura was now served by three through sailings a day instead of three per week.

In 1970, the Sound of Islay began the Campbeltown (Kintyre) – Red Bay (Northern Ireland) service and was successful with the initial help of a cement strike in Ireland and a dock strike in England. Attempts to keep up a winter service, primarily with timber, were unsuccessful. The Sound of Islay however, under Captain Alister Meenan, took over the Kennacraig - Port Askaig route offering.

Caledonian MacBrayne positioned a new ferry on the same route in 1974. The new Cal-Mac service was subsidised by the Government leaving Western unable to compete. Western Ferries started to lose traffic to the new ferry, and after receiving an offer from the Mexican Government, sold Sound of Jura in 1976. They continued to serve Islay until 1981 using Sound of Islay when she too was withdrawn, unable to keep pace with the heavily subsidised CalMac, and was sold to the Government of Newfoundland and Labrador in Canada, where she remains in service to this day.

=== Clyde service ===
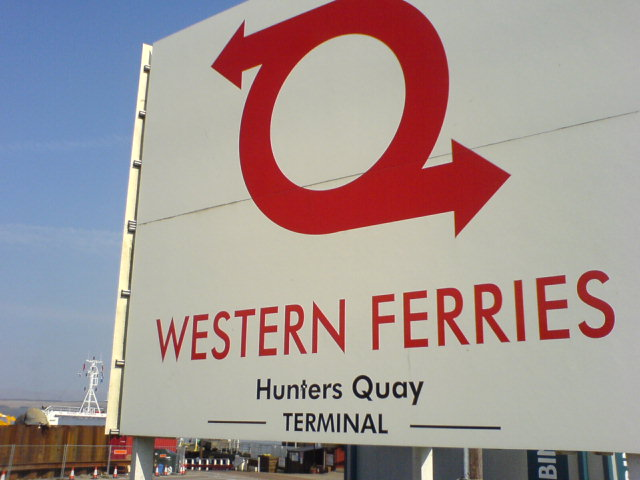
Hunters Quay terminal

In June 1973, Western Ferries opened a new route across the Firth of Clyde between McInroy's Point (Gourock) and Hunters Quay using two modified Swedish vessels Sound of Scarba and Sound of Shuna. These had bow and stern ramps, allowing roll-on/roll-off operation. Traffic developed rapidly and in August 1974, the former Isle of Wight ferry, MV Lymington joined the service as Sound of Sanda. This crossing was much shorter than the parallel Caledonian MacBrayne Public Service route. Although CalMac's vessels were considerably faster, their longer route meant that both operators took around 20 minutes to make the crossing. The simpler ro-ro service was regular, frequent and ran from 7 am until 10 pm.In 1985, after the Clyde service was transferred to Western Ferries (Clyde) Ltd, new tonnage was sought and appeared in early 1986 when the company bought another former Sealink ferry, the Freshwater. She entered service as Sound of Seil in 1986. A further vessel, the Sound of Sleat, a former Dutch river ferry (ex de Hoorn) was added two years later. Two further ferries were purchased from Dutch owners, in 1995 and 1996. Both Sound of Scalpay and the second Sound of Sanda replaced older vessels.

In 2001, Ferguson Shipbuilders of Port Glasgow delivered the second Sound of Scarba, the company's first new ferry for the service. The old vessel was sold after a few years of mooring in the Holy Loch. A new Sound of Shuna followed in October 2003.

Between late 2006 and September 2007 facilities at both ports were restructured. The car marshalling areas were enlarging and a second linkspan was installed at both Hunters Quay and McInroys Point.

All four ferries operate during peak periods, providing a 15-minute service. At other times, three crossings per hour are provided whilst evenings and quieter times see a vessel depart every 30 minutes.

In 2013 two new vessels were commissioned by Western. These were built by the Cammell Laird Shipyard in Merseyside. Entering the fleet that October as Sound of Soay and Sound of Seil, this brought the fleet size to six but this dropped to four on disposal of the two oldest vessels (Scalpay and Sanda). In 2025, another two ferries were commissioned for introduction the following year.

The company employs over 60 members of staff.

The contract for two new vessels was signed in May 2025 with Cammell Laird, Birkenhead. These vessels will be very similar to the rest of the fleet and expected to be delivered in autumn 2026. On 25 November 2025, the keel was laid for the first vessel, named MV Sound of Scalpay (II). The second one will be named MV Sound of Sleat (II).

=== Arran service ===
In early January 2010, the company announced that it was to commence a high frequency, low fare route between Ardrossan and Brodick in direct competition to publicly owned Caledonian MacBrayne. They stated that they were planning to build a new vessel with a carrying capacity of 400 passengers and 70 vehicles and services were expected to begin in 2012.

In September 2011 managing director Gordon Ross announced that the Arran project was still alive but would be delayed by the uncertainty as to whether the Arran route will be tendered separately from the main CalMac bundle in 2013.

== Community involvement ==
The company has a high profile in the communities it serves. There is significant investment in employing local workers and in locally sourced goods and services. Funds are made available for the sponsorship of local groups, individuals, sports organisations and charities. Western Ferries sponsors local sporting events including the Cowal Highland Gathering.

The company provides a call-out service through the night for the Scottish Ambulance Service, for ambulances carrying emergency cases to hospitals in Greenock, Paisley and Glasgow

== Fleet ==
=== Present fleet ===
The company runs a fleet of four purpose-built car ferries.

Name	Cars	Built	Notes	Image
MV Sound of Scarba (II)	40	2001 (Ferguson Shipbuilders, Port Glasgow, Scotland)		
MV Sound of Seil (II)	40	2013 (Cammell Laird, Birkenhead, England)		
MV Sound of Shuna (II)	40	2003 (Ferguson Shipbuilders, Port Glasgow, Scotland)		
MV Sound of Soay	40	2013 (Cammell Laird, Birkenhead, England)		

=== Future fleet ===
The company is currently building two purpose-built car ferries, very similar to the rest of their fleet.

Name	Cars	Built	Notes	Image
MV Sound of Scalpay (II)	40	2026 (Cammell Laird, Birkenhead, England)	Keel laid on 25 November 2025.	
MV Sound of Sleat (II)	40	2026 (Cammell Laird, Birkenhead, England)		

=== Historic fleet ===
Name	Cars	Built	Route	Notes	Image
MV Highland Seabird	-	1976 (Westermoen Hydrofoil, Mandal, Norway)		Passenger only Catamaran hull. Operated briefly as a Mersey Ferry between Liverpool and Birkenhead in 1982. Sold from the fleet in 1985 to Emeraude Ferries operating out of St Malo, and renamed Trident 2.	
MV Sound of Gigha		1966 (Bideford Shipyard)	Port Askaig - Jura (1969 - 1998)	ex-Isle of Gigha Sold 1998	
MV Sound of Islay	20	1968 (Ferguson Shipbuilders, Port Glasgow)	Kennacraig - Gigha - Port Askaig (1968 - 1970); Campbeltown - Red Bay (1970 - 1973); Kennacraig - Port Askaig (1976 - 1981)	1981 Sold to Government of Newfoundland & Labrador	
MV Sound of Jura	36	1969 (Hatlø Verksted A/S, Ulsteinvik, Norway)	Kennacraig - Port Askaig (1969 - 1976)		
MV Sound of Sanda (I)	17	1938 (William Denny and Brothers, Dumbarton)	McInroy's Point - Hunters Quay (August 1974 - 1993)	ex-Lymington; scrapped	
MV Sound of Sanda (II)	37	1963 (Walsum, Germany)	McInroy's Point - Hunters Quay (1996 - 2013)	Sold October 2013	
MV Sound of Scalpay (I)	37	1961 (Arnhem, Holland)	McInroy's Point - Hunters Quay (1995 - 2013)	Sold October 2013	
MV Sound of Scarba (I)		1960 (AB Asi-Verken, Åmål, Sweden)	McInroy's Point - Hunters Quay (July 1973 - 2001)	ex-Olandssund III; Sold 2001	
MV Sound of Seil (I)		1959 (Ailsa yard, Troon)	McInroy's Point - Hunters Quay (June 1986 - 2003)	ex-Freshwater; scrapped ?1997	
MV Sound of Shuna (I)	24	1962 (AB Asi-Verken, Åmål, Sweden)	McInroy's Point - Hunters Quay (June 1973 - 2003)	ex-Olandssund IV; Sold 2003	
MV Sound of Sleat (I)	30	1961 (Hardinxveld, Netherlands)	McInroy's Point - Hunters Quay (1988 - 2004)	ex-de Hoorn	
