= Cammell Laird Shipyard occupation =

The Cammell Laird Shipyard occupation was a 1984 labour dispute that took place at the Cammell Laird shipyard in Birkenhead, England. The dispute was result of compulsory redundancies at the shipyard and involved the occupation of two vessels to prevent them being removed. The protestors were arrested and later jailed for their actions.

== History ==
May 1984 saw just under a thousand redundancies announced at the shipyard, prompting hundreds of workers to down tools in protest. During the dispute, some of the workers occupied a partially built gas rig, AV-1. By August, the number of protestors occupying the vessel had dropped to 37 but they were facing increasing pressure to leave the site. Their wives received letters warning of prison sentences if the protestors refused to leave the site. A writ was posted in September charging them in absentia with trespassing. Government minister Geoffrey Howe had used antiquated law originating from the monks of Birkenhead Priory hundreds of years before.

Police arrested 37 men who were sentenced in their absence to 30 days' imprisonment for contempt of court after defying a judge's orders to leave the rig. The workers lost their right to redundancy and a pension.

== Legal action ==
Responding to questions from four MPs in parliament in April 2017, government Justice Minister Phillip Lee agreed to look into the case if re-elected in the forthcoming June election.

Labour MEPs took the fight to clear the worker's names to the European Parliament in July 2013, having had a petition successfully accepted in December 2012 by the petitions committee in Strasbourg. Labour MEP Judith Kirton-Darling claimed that no law was broken and the protestors were never told why they were arrested, and called for the government to release the official documents relating to the incident.

An early day motion was submitted to the UK Parliament in April 2021 which called for an enquiry and the release associated official documents.

In February 2023, the issue was again raised in Parliament, with MPs Gareth Thomas and Ian Byrne pushing for an inquiry into the event. Justice minister Edward Argar suggested the members should write to him in order to begin investigations as to what potential legal routes would be available.
