= Cammell Laird =

British shipbuilding and repair company

Coordinates: 53°23′6.85″N 3°0′45.01″W

- Type: Private Company
- Industry: Shipbuilding and ship repair
- Founded: 1828
- Headquarters: Birkenhead, England
- Key people: David McGinley (CEO); Mike Hill (MD)
- Revenue: ▲£162.8 million (2025)
- Net income: ▲£8.1 million (2025)
- Number of employees: >550
- Website: cammell-laird.co.uk

Cammell Laird is a British shipbuilding company. It was formed from the merger of Laird Brothers of Birkenhead and Johnson Cammell & Co of Sheffield at the turn of the twentieth century. The company also built railway rolling stock until 1929, when that side of the business was separated and became part of the Metropolitan-Cammell Carriage & Wagon Company.

== History ==
=== Formation from merger of Laird Company and Cammell & Co. ===
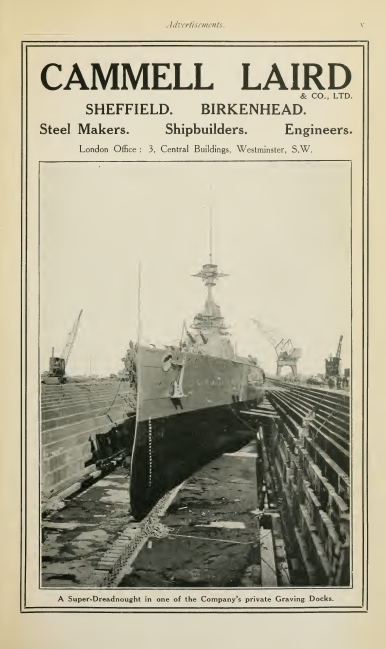
1915 advertisement for Cammell Laird

The Laird Company was founded by William Laird, who had established the Birkenhead Iron Works in 1824. When he was joined by his son, John Laird in 1828, their first ship was an iron barge. John realised that the techniques of making boilers could be applied to making ships. The company soon became pre-eminent in the manufacture of iron ships and also made major advances in propulsion. In 1860, John Laird was joined in the business by his three sons, renaming the company John Laird, Sons & Co. The sons continued the business after their father's death in 1874 as Laird Brothers.

Johnson, Cammell & Co., later Charles Cammell & Co., was founded by Charles Cammell and Henry and Thomas Johnson: it made, amongst many other metal products, iron wheels and rails for Britain's railways and was based in Sheffield.

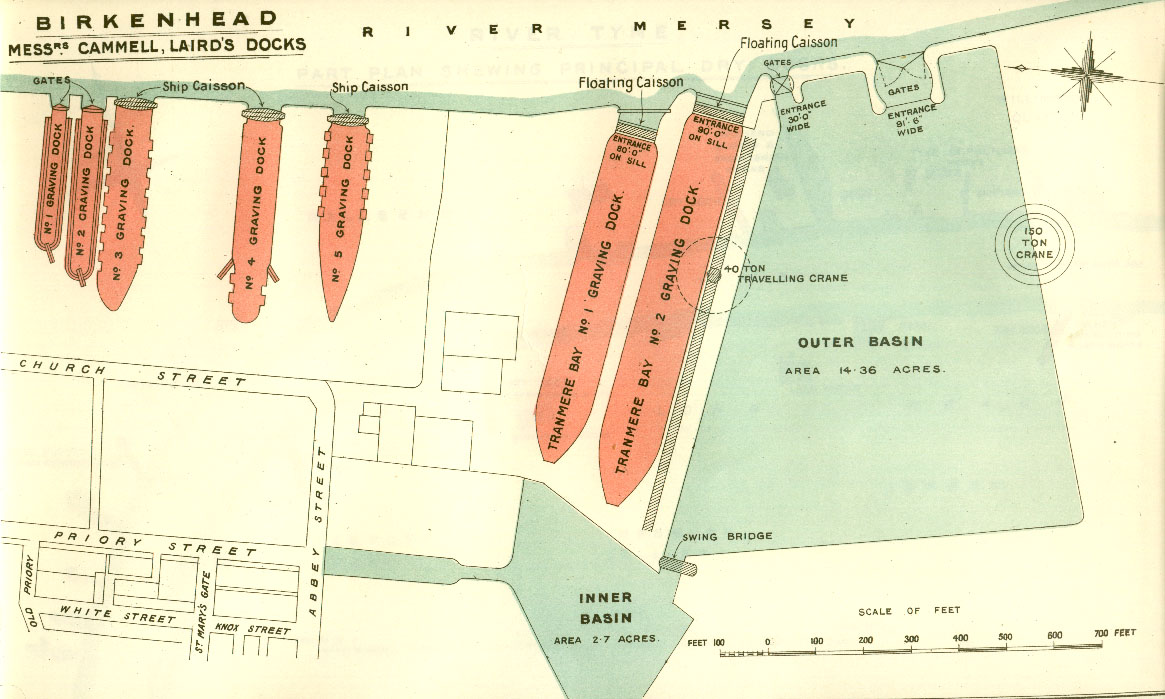
The layout of Cammell Laird's docks in 1909

In 1903 the businesses of Messrs. Cammell and Laird merged to create a company at the forefront of shipbuilding. The company also built a number of vehicles for the London Underground. An order was placed for 20 trailer cars and 20 control trailer cars in 1919, which were known as 1920 Stock, and were the first tube cars to be built with doors operated by compressed air. They ran with converted French motor cars, originally built in 1906. The doors were fitted with a sensitive edge, designed to re-open the door if someone became trapped in it, but the mechanism was too sensitive, and was removed after an initial trial period. The cars continued in operation until 1938, eight years after the motor cars were withdrawn, but following withdrawal, five cars became a mobile training school. Cammell Laird also built a number of Standard Stock vehicles for the Underground. They were one of five builders approached to build a sample car to a general specification, which were put into service in February 1923, and three of the builders subsequently built production runs. The company supplied 41 motor cars and 40 trailer cars in 1923, 25 control trailers in 1924, and a further 48 motor cars in 1925.

In 1927, they built 160 passenger coaches for use in India. To transport them, Cammell Laird asked Watsons of Gainsborough to build five dumb barges. The coaches were loaded onto the barges at Clifton, near Nottingham on the River Trent, and towed in pairs downriver by a twin-screwed tug named Motorman, built by Henry Scarr of Hessle in 1925. They were taken to Hull for export. In 1929, the railway rolling stock business of Cammell Laird was spun off and merged to become Metropolitan-Cammell Carriage & Wagon Company.

Between 1829 and 1947, over 1,100 vessels of all kinds were launched from the Cammell Laird slipways into the River Mersey. Among the many famous ships made by the companies were the world's first steel ship, the Ma Roberts, built in 1858 for Dr. Livingstone's Zambezi expedition, CSS Alabama that was built in 1862 for the Confederate States of America, HMS Caroline that holds the record fastest build time of any significant warship (nine months from her keel being laid till her launch), the first all-welded ship, the Fullagar built in 1920, Cunard's second RMS Mauretania, the aircraft carrier HMS Ark Royal (1937) the battleship HMS Prince of Wales (1941) and the largest vessel to have been built for the Royal Navy up to that time, HMS Ark Royal (1950).

In 1898, Cammell provided the half-inch armour plate used to fabricate the four Fowler Armoured Road Trains built during the Second Anglo-Boer War. The armoured road train was the first self-propelled, free-roaming, armoured military land vehicle ever built, predating the tanks of World War One by nearly two decades.

=== Post 1945 and 1993 closure ===
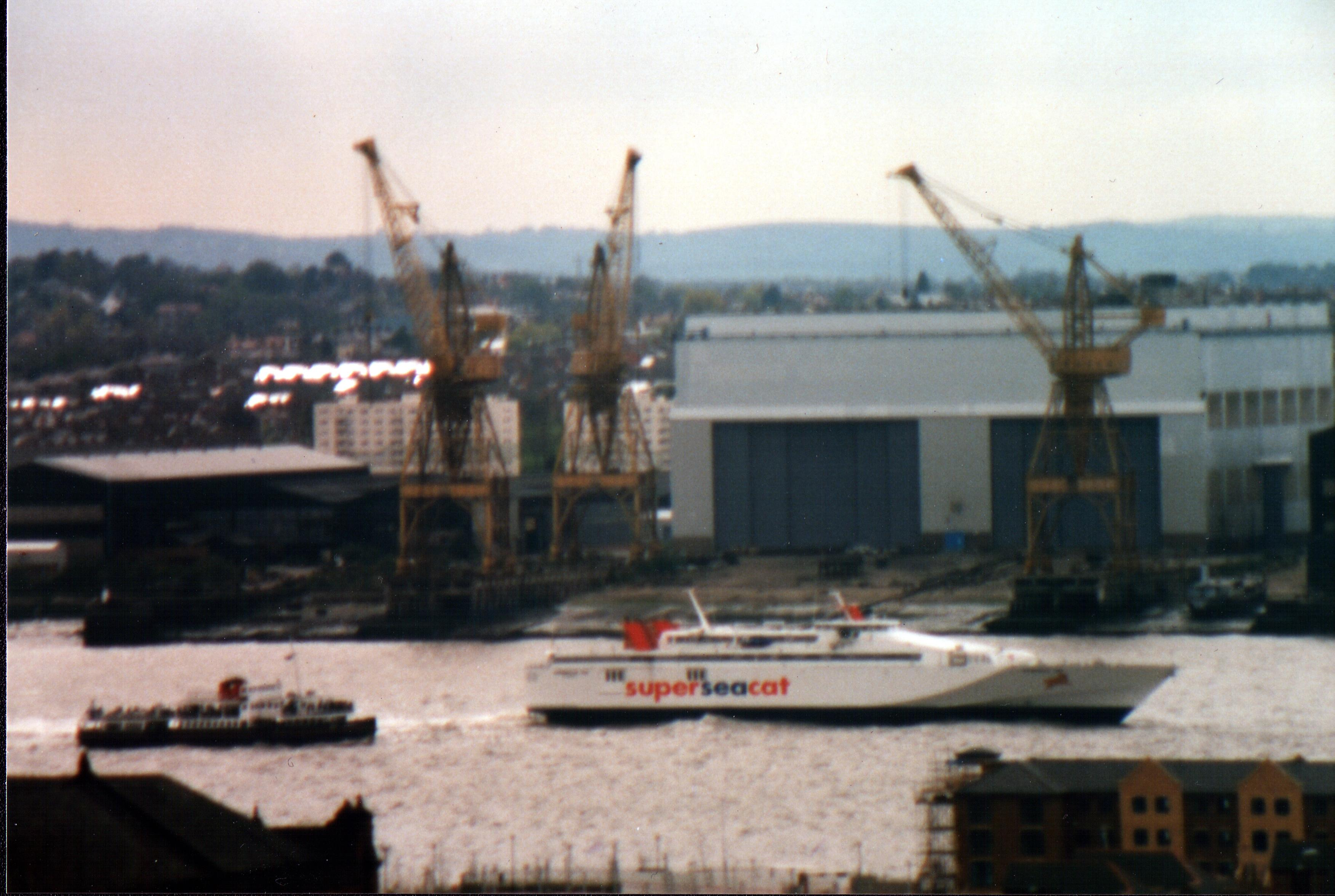
Cammell Laird's covered submarine building hall and berth cranes, 2006

The company was nationalised along with the rest of the British shipbuilding industry as British Shipbuilders in 1977. The yard was subject to a labour dispute in 1984 triggered by the yard making nearly 1,000 redundancies. This led to some of the workers occupying a partially built gas rig, AV-1. 37 workers were later arrested, jailed and sacked for their roles in the protest.

In 1986, it returned to the private sector as part of Barrow-in-Furness-based Vickers Shipbuilding & Engineering (VSE). VSE and Cammell Laird were the only British shipyards capable of producing nuclear submarines. In 1993, it completed HMS Unicorn (S43) – now HMCS Windsor. After the end of the Upholder-class submarine building programme in 1993, the owners of Cammell Laird, VSE, announced the yard's closure. This was strongly opposed by the workforce through trade union campaigners including the GMB, led by communist firebrand official Barry Williams.

=== Re-establishment and ship repair ===
Part of the shipyard site was leased by the Coastline Group as a ship repair facility. Coastline eventually bought part of the shipyard and adopted the Cammell Laird name, before floating on the London stock exchange in 1997 and acquiring dockyards at Teesside, Tyneside and Gibraltar.

After experiencing financial difficulties, partly due to the late withdrawal from a £50 million refit contract for the cruise ship Costa Classica cruise ship by Costa Crociere, the company was forced to enter receivership in April 2001, and the Birkenhead, Teesside and Tyneside shipyards owned by Cammell Laird shiprepair were acquired by the A&P Shiprepair Group in 2001. Cammell Laird Gibraltar, the Royal Dockyard facility in Gibraltar, was disposed of through a local management buyout.

=== Second rebirth as Cammell Laird Shiprepair ===
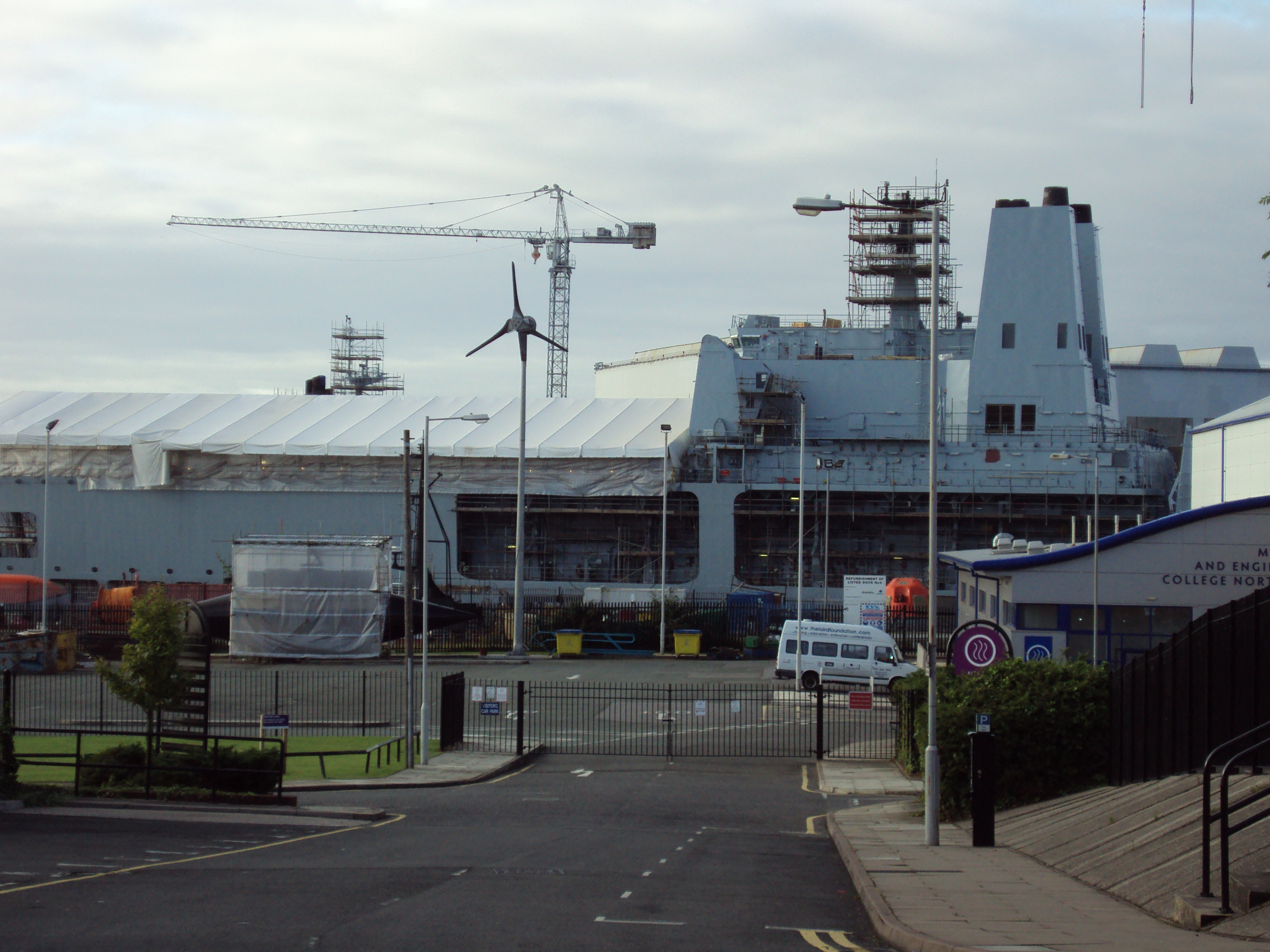
A Fort Victoria-class replenishment oiler undergoing refit work at Cammell Laird, 2009

A&P Group sold its Birkenhead subsidiary (A&P Birkenhead) to Northwestern Shiprepairers & Shipbuilders in 2005. Peel Holdings, owners of the Mersey Docks and Harbour Company and 50% owners of Northwestern Shiprepairers & Shipbuilders, purchased the Cammell Laird shipyard site and surrounding land in January 2007, to facilitate the proposed Wirral Waters development, although Northwestern Shiprepairers & Shipbuilders continue to maintain a long-term lease on the shipyard facilities, which will form an integral part of the regeneration scheme.

In 2007, it was announced that the occupiers of Cammell Laird Dock, Northwestern Shiprepairers & Shipbuilders, had acquired the rights to the Cammell Laird name. On 17 November 2008, Northwestern Shiprepairers & Shipbuilders officially renamed itself Cammell Laird Shiprepairers & Shipbuilders Limited, stating that recent economic success had made the time right, and that "Cammell Laird is an internationally recognised brand which carries tremendous goodwill when bidding for contracts."

In February 2008, it was announced that the company had won a £28m Ministry of Defence contract to overhaul the Royal Fleet Auxiliary ship RFA Fort Rosalie.

In January 2010, it was announced that Lairds had received a £44m order for the flight decks of the Royal Navy's new aircraft carrier HMS Queen Elizabeth.

In May 2012, it was announced that complete shipbuilding was set to return to the yard with the awarding of preferred bidder status for two new car ferries for Dunoon-based operator, Western Ferries. Construction of MV Sound of Seil and MV Sound of Soay began in October 2012.

In April 2014, the government authorised procurement of a Royal Research Ship for the British Antarctic Survey, at an estimated cost of £200 million. Cammell Laird won the construction contract in 2015. The vessel, named RRS Sir David Attenborough began sea trials in 2020; she took her maiden voyage to Antarctica in November 2021.

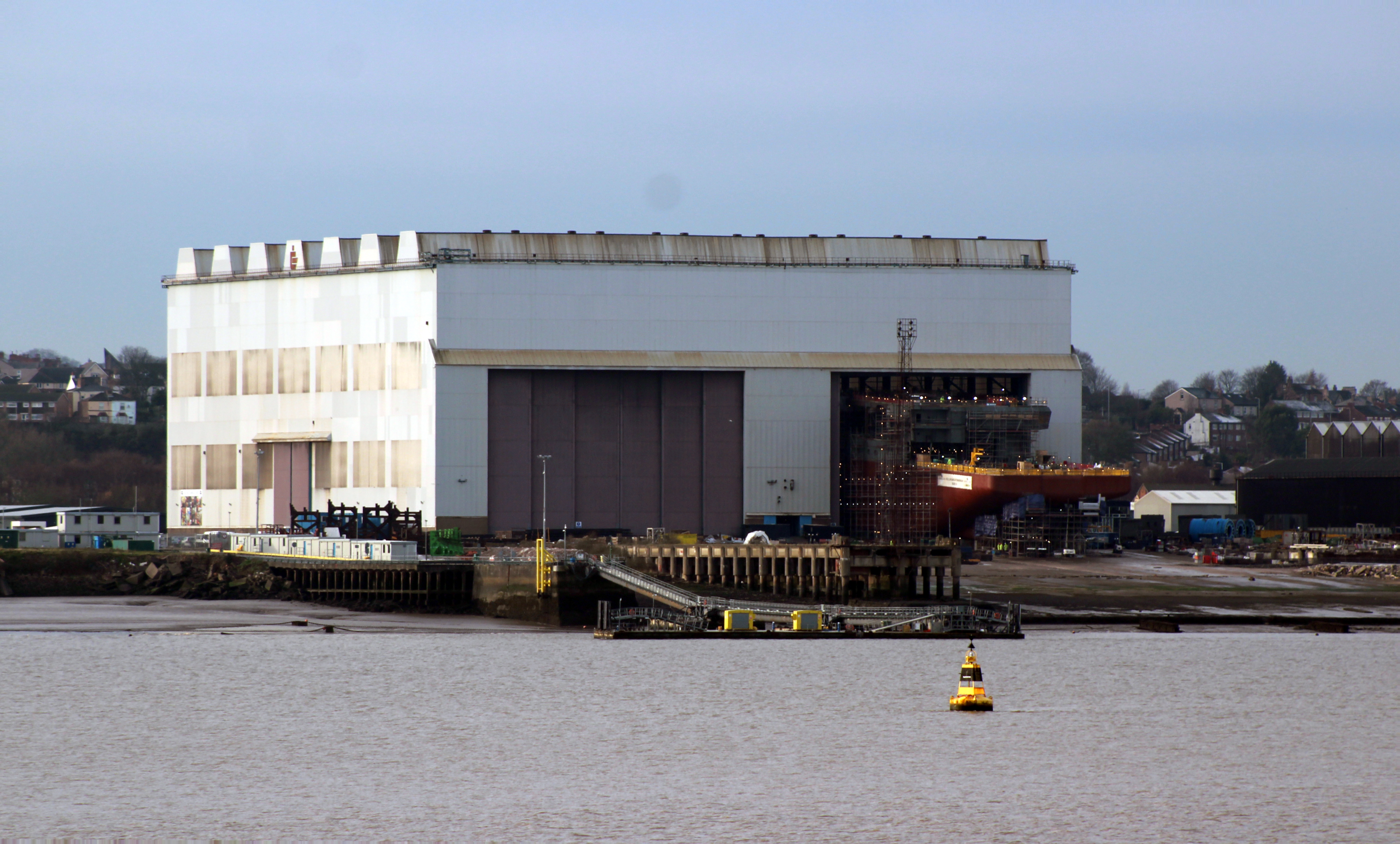
The shipbuilding hall with RRS Sir David Attenborough under construction

It was announced in October 2017 that Cammell Laird had struck a 'teaming agreement' with BAE Systems to bid for Ministry of Defence contracts to build the Royal Navy's Type 31e frigates.

In 2018, Red Funnel chose the shipyard to construct a £10m cargo ferry, Red Kestrel. Construction of the ferry began with a formal keel laying ceremony on 31 May and the vessel entered service a year later.

In October 2018 it was announced that the yard had won 'Lot 3' of an MOD contract to maintain the four new Tide class of tankers for the RFA in a deal worth an estimated £262m. A new contract worth £357m was also announced that would see Cammell Laird continue to maintain the five RFA ships it currently supports.

The yard was named as part of a consortium to build the Royal Navy's new Type 26 Frigate in September 2023. BAE Systems are the primary contractor, but Cammell Laird will be used to build sections of HMS Birmingham.

=== Revival in fortunes and new owners ===
Whilst the £200 million build of the Sir David Attenborough had been a big boost for the yard and bought it a lot of prestige, the build proved problematic and there were significant cost overruns. However, by 2025 the fortunes of the business had changed with revenues up to £162.8m.

The shipyard's owners, APCL Group, announced in June 2026 that the business had been sold to Balaena. The Cammell Laird yard will be rebranded as Balaena Mersey.

== In popular culture ==
The shipyard is referenced in Jules Verne's novel Twenty Thousand Leagues Under the Seas as "Laird's of Liverpool" (though it is located in Birkenhead, not Liverpool). Verne visited Birkenhead in 1859 and 1867 and states in the story that some of the iron plates for the Nautilus were made there.

Birkenhead band Half Man Half Biscuit's ninth album is called Cammell Laird Social Club.

The modern sea shanty Roll, Alabama, Roll describes the life of "The Alabama" from being "laid in the yard of Jonathan Laird" to her sinking.

== Ships built by Cammell Laird ==
See: List of ships built by Cammell Laird

== See also ==
- ROF Nottingham
- Metro-Cammell
- Cammell Laird Gibraltar
- Grayson Rollo and Clover Docks
- Cammell Laird Social Club (album by Half Man Half Biscuit)
- Hong Kong Railways Company Ltd- Cammell Model, Last Service in May 2022, Operated at MTR 12 Cars at East Rail Line.
