= MV Sound of Soay =

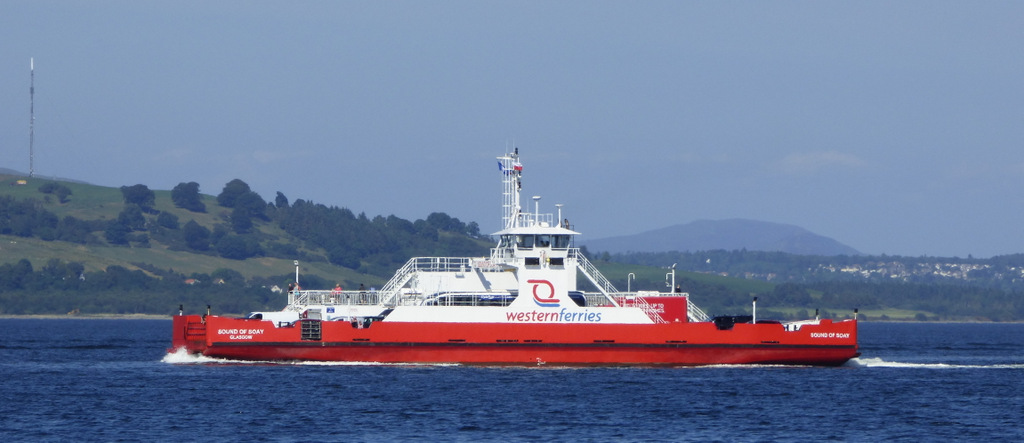
- Between McInroy’s Point and Hunters Quay

History

United Kingdom
- Name: MV Sound of Soay
- Namesake: Sound between Skye and Soay
- Operator: Western Ferries
- Route: Gourock to Dunoon
- Builder: Cammell Laird, Birkenhead
- Cost: estimated £4 million
- Yard number: 1388
- Launched: 22 July 2013
- In service: October 2013
- Identification: IMO number: 9665229; Callsign: 2GWI3; MMSI number: 235101063
- Status: in service

General characteristics
- Class & type: Passenger/vehicle ferry
- Type: roll-on/roll-off ferry
- Tonnage: 225 DWT 497 GT
- Length: 49.95 m (163.9 ft)
- Beam: 15 m (49.2 ft)
- Draught: 2.5 m
- Ramps: 2
- Installed power: 2 x Cummins QSK19M 600 BHP @ 1800 rpm
- Propulsion: 2 x Rolls-Royce Aquamaster azimuthing thrusters
- Speed: 12 kt
- Capacity: 220 passengers 40 cars

MV Sound of Soay is a car and passenger ferry, operated by Western Ferries on the upper Clyde between Gourock and Dunoon, Scotland.

== History ==
Sound of Soay was built entirely in the UK by Cammell Laird of Birkenhead. She was launched/ craned into the River Mersey on 22 July 2013, the first complete ship from the yard since 1992. After fitting out, she entered service in October 2013.

== Layout ==
Sound of Soay and her sister, MV Sound of Seil were a development of the design of the earlier fleet members. They have a single car deck with 194 lane-metres and bow and stern ramps. There is a passenger lounge. The ferries utilise LED lighting and enhanced heat recovery.

== Service ==
Along with up to three other vessels, Sound of Soay operates Western Ferries' Clyde service between McInroy's Point (Gourock) and Hunters Quay (Dunoon). This 2.2 nautical mile crossing allows vehicles to avoid the A83 "Rest and be thankful".
