= MV Loch Sunart =

Car and passenger ferry, originally operated in Amsterdam

History

United Kingdom
- Name: Loch Sunart; 1996–2015: Sound of Scalpay; 1962–1994: Gemeente Pont 23
- Namesake: Loch Sunart and Scalpay
- Owner: Caldive
- Operator: Gemeentelijk Vervoerbedrijf (GVB) (1962–1994); Western Ferries (1994–2013); The Underwater Centre (2013–2018); Caldive (2019–present)
- Route: 1962–1994: Amsterdam CS – Buiksloterweg; 1996–2013: Gourock – Dunoon
- Builder: Arnhemsche Scheepsbouw Maatschappij N.V., Arnhem, Netherlands
- Yard number: 403
- In service: 1962
- Out of service: 2013
- Homeport: Glasgow
- Identification: IMO number: 8928882; MMSI Number: 235008146; Callsign: MVFY3
- Status: laid up in Fort William

General characteristics
- Class & type: ROV Support Vessel
- Type: roll-on/roll-off ferry
- Tonnage: 211 DWT; 403 GT
- Length: 48.43 m (158.9 ft)
- Beam: 13.87 m (45.5 ft)
- Draught: 2.7 m
- Installed power: i) diesel-electric machinery ii) 2x Caterpillar 3408TA of 486bhp / 358kw each
- Propulsion: i) Twin screw ii) 2x Holland Roer Propeller azimuth propulsion units
- Speed: 9 knots (17 km/h)
- Capacity: was 34 cars
- Complement: was 220 passengers
- Crew: 4

MV Loch Sunart (ex-Gemeente Pont 23 then Sound of Scalpay) was a car and passenger ferry, originally operated in Amsterdam, and then by Western Ferries across the Firth of Clyde between Gourock and Dunoon in Scotland until October 2013. In 2018, Loch Sunart was converted into an ROV support vessel and is now owned by Caldive.

== History ==
Gemeente Pont 23 was built in Arnhem, Netherlands in 1962, for Amsterdam City Council.

In the mid 1990s, she and her near sister Gemeente Pont 24 were purchased by Western Ferries for service on the Clyde. They were overhauled at Greenock and renamed Sound of Scalpay and Sound of Sanda before entering service at McInroy's Point.

On the acquisition of two brand new ferries in October 2013, Scalpay and Sound of Sanda were sold to The Underwater Centre, Fort William, Highland for conversion to dive barges for the training of commercial divers. Scalpay was converted into an ROV support vessel and renamed Loch Sunart.

In October 2018, The Underwater Centre ceased trading and entered administration. Loch Sunart was purchased at auction by Caldive of Invergordon at the start of 2019 and laid up with her sister ship Loch Scavaig at Fort William.

== Layout ==
Sound of Scalpay had a single car deck with bow and stern ramps. The crossing was so short that many passengers stayed in their vehicles, but side viewing decks and passenger cabins were available.

== Service ==
Gemeentepont 23 operated from Amsterdam CS to Buiksloterweg in Amsterdam-Noord (now route NH25) between 1962 and 1994.

In July 1995, as Sound of Scalpay, she entered service on Western Ferries' Clyde service between McInroy's Point (Gourock) and Hunters Quay (Dunoon), replacing the former Sealink ferry Sound of Seil. Scalpay and Sanda operated this service until 2013.
