= Avinagillan standing stone =

Prehistoric menhir on the Kintyre Peninsula of Scotland

Coordinates: 55°51′06″N 5°27′14″W

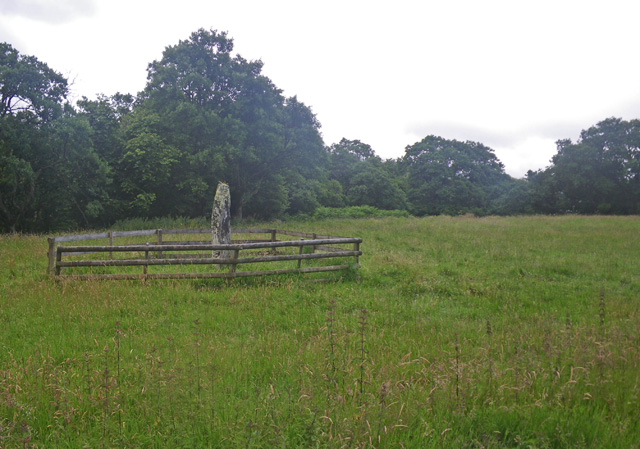
Avinagillan standing stone

The Avinagillan standing stone is a prehistoric menhir on the Kintyre Peninsula of Scotland. The stone is near the hamlet of Avinagillan.

== See also ==
- Kilbrannan Sound
