= MV Loch Scavaig =

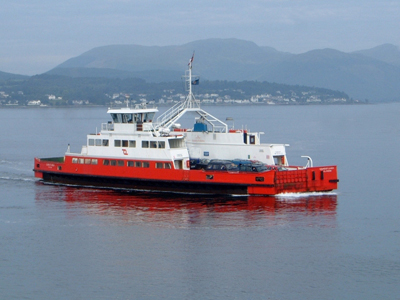
- MV Sound of Sanda

History

United Kingdom
- Name: Loch Scavaig; 1996-2015: Sound of Sanda; 1963-1996: Gemeente Pont 24
- Namesake: Sea Loch on Skye and Sanda Island
- Owner: Caldive
- Operator: Gemeentelijk Vervoerbedrijf (GVB) (1963-1996); Western Ferries (1996-2013); The Underwater Centre (2013-2018); Caldive (2019-present)
- Route: 1963-1996: Amsterdam CS to Buiksloterweg; 1996-2013: Gourock to Dunoon
- Builder: Gutehoffnungshulte Sterkrade, Akflengesellschaft, Rheinwerft, Walsum, Germany
- Yard number: 1002
- In service: 1963
- Out of service: 2013
- Homeport: Glasgow
- Identification: IMO number: 8928894; MMSI Number: 235008136; Callsign: MWVB5
- Status: laid up in Fort William

General characteristics
- Class & type: Dive Support Vessel
- Type: Double screw steel motor roll-on/roll-off ferry
- Tonnage: 211 DWT; 403 GT
- Length: 48 m (157.5 ft)
- Beam: 14 m (45.9 ft)
- Draught: 2.7 m
- Installed power: 2 CAT V8 3408 marine
- Propulsion: 2 HRP/ZF thrusters
- Speed: 9 knots
- Capacity: was 37 cars
- Complement: was 220 Passengers
- Crew: 4

MV Loch Scavaig (ex Sound of Sanda) was a car and passenger ferry, operated until October 2013 by Western Ferries across the Firth of Clyde between Gourock and Dunoon. In 2018, Loch Scavaig was converted into a saturation dive support vessel and is now owned by Caldive.

== History ==
Sound of Sanda was built in Walsum, Duisburg, Germany in 1963, for Amsterdam City Council. In the mid 1990s, she and her near sister Sound of Scalpay were purchased by Western Ferries and overhauled at Greenock before entering service as Sound of Scalpay and a second Sound of Sanda. The earlier Sound of Sanda, as MV Lymington, had previously been an Isle of Wight ferry. Sound of Sanda entered service with Western Ferries in 1996.

On the acquisition of two brand new ferries in October 2013, Sanda along with her sister ship Sound of Scalpay were disposed of by Western Ferries. Both vessels were sold to The Underwater Centre, Fort William, Highland for conversion to dive barges for the training of commercial divers.

From January to June 2018, she was converted into a saturation dive vessel, funded by Subsea 7 and TechnipFMC. She was renamed Loch Scavaig but was only in service for 3 months until October 2018 when The Underwater Centre ceased trading and entered administration with the loss of 48 jobs in the Fort William area.

Loch Scavaig was purchased at auction by Caldive of Invergordon at the start of 2019 and is currently laid up with her sister ship Loch Sunart (ex Sound of Scalpay, built in 1961 and converted to a ROV support vessel). She has recently taken part in some subsea trials.

== Layout ==
Sound of Sanda had a single car deck with bow and stern ramps. The crossing was so short that many passengers stayed in their vehicles, but side viewing decks and passenger cabins were available.

== Service ==
Gemeentepont 24 operated from Amsterdam CS to Buiksloterweg in Amsterdam-Noord (now route NH25) between 1963 and 1996.

As Sound of Sanda, she operated Western Ferries' Clyde service between McInroy's Point (Gourock) and Hunters Quay (Dunoon) until 2013.
