= Ballochroy =

Megalithic site in Kintyre, Scotland

Ballymeanoch
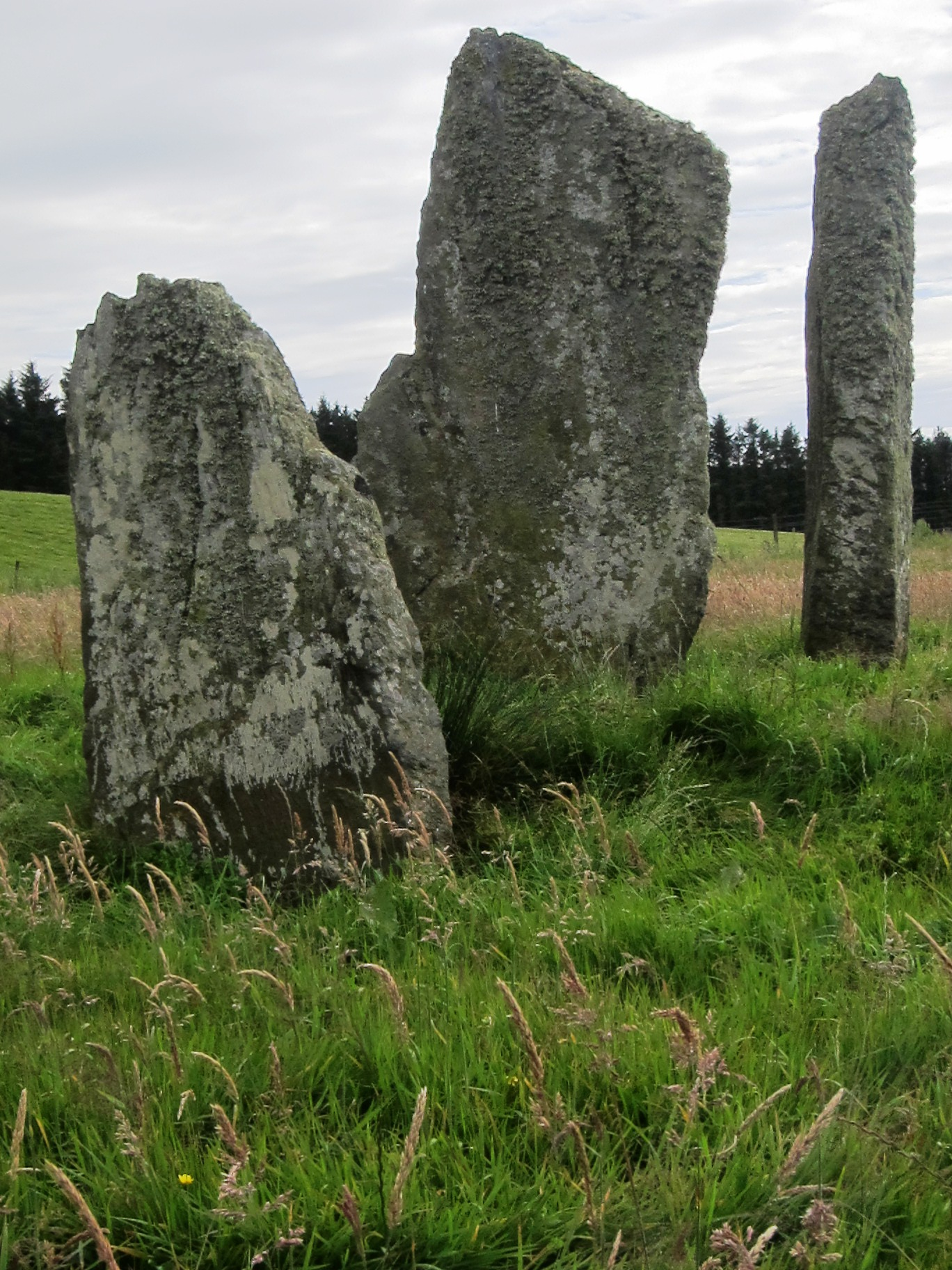
- Ballochroy standing stones
- Interactive map of Ballymeanoch
- 55.71195°N 5.61396°W
- Location: Kintyre, Argyll and Bute

Site notes
- Material: Stone
- Public access: Yes

Scheduled monument
- Official name: Ballochroy, three standing stones & cist
- Type: Prehistoric ritual and funerary: cist; standing stone
- Designated: 30 October 1936
- Reference no.: SM175

Ballochroy is a megalithic site in Kintyre on the Argyll peninsula in Scotland. It consists of three vertical stones, side by side, aligned with various land features 7–19 miles (11–31 km) away.

Alexander Thom, known for his work on Stonehenge, maintained that the great length between the stones and the features of distant landscape lent precision to pinpointing the midsummer and winter soltices for ancient observers, indicating that the monument was used as an astronomic calendar.

These three stones are considered the most spectacular set of megalithic monuments that cluster around South Argyll. The three mica schist stones were measured at 11 ft 6 in, 9 ft 10 in and 6 ft 7 in (3.5, 3.0 and 2.0 m) in height. The last, smallest stone may have been broken off at the top. The line of stones is oriented north-east to south-west.

The flat face of the central stone (at right angles to the alignment) indicates the mountain of Cora Bheinn, on the island of Jura, which is 19 miles (30 km) away. The shortest stone also faces across the alignment, and points to Beinn a' Chaolais, the southernmost of the three Paps of Jura. The sunset would have given a warning of the approach of the solstice.

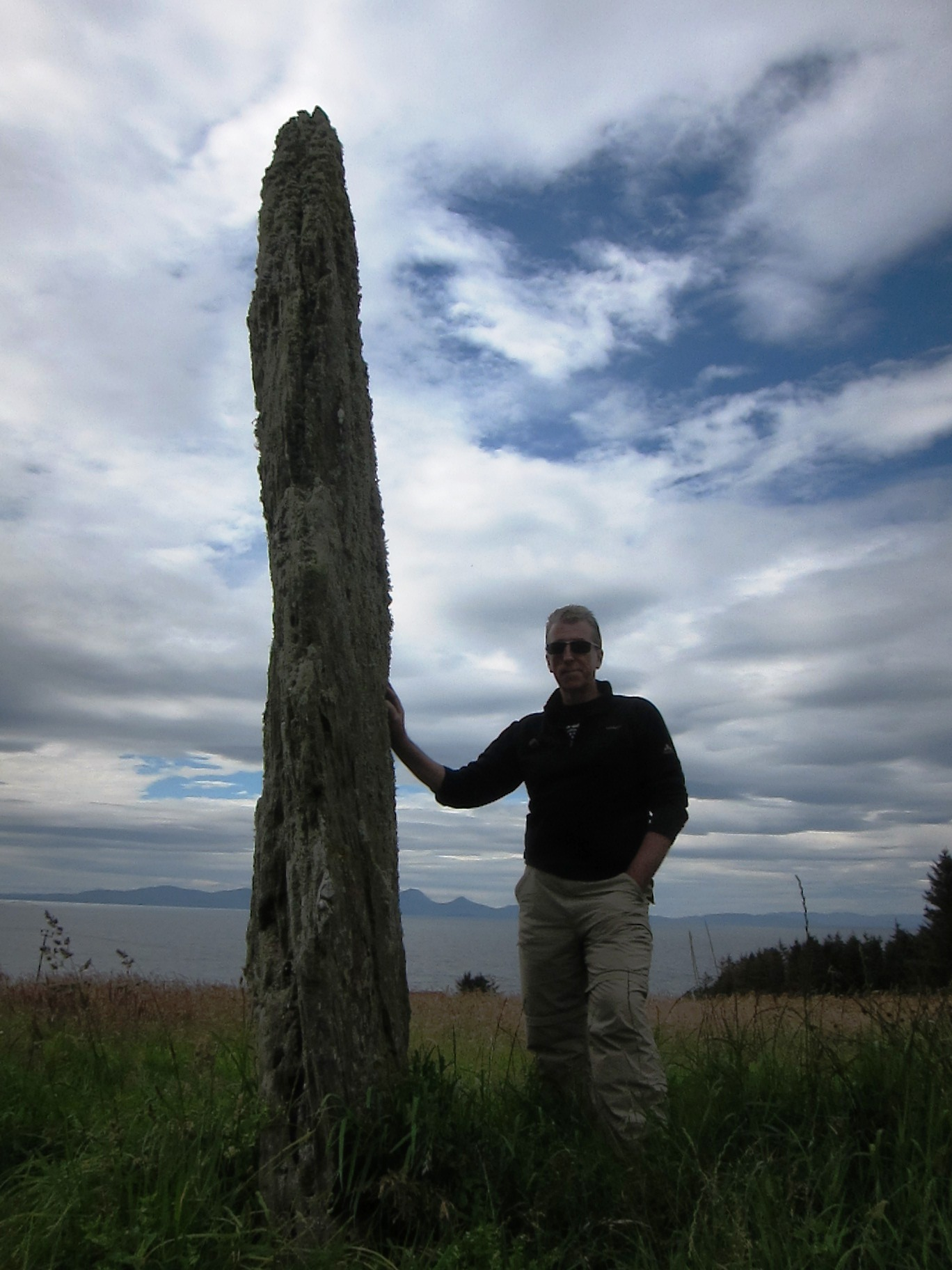
Ballochroy, Menhir with Jura in the background

As with many megalithic sites, the current theories concerning the exact use of the stones at Ballochroy are somewhat controversial.

== See also ==
- List of archaeoastronomical sites sorted by country
