= Kintyre =

Peninsula in Argyll and Bute, Scotland

Kintyre Cinn Tìre (Scottish Gaelic)
- Peninsula
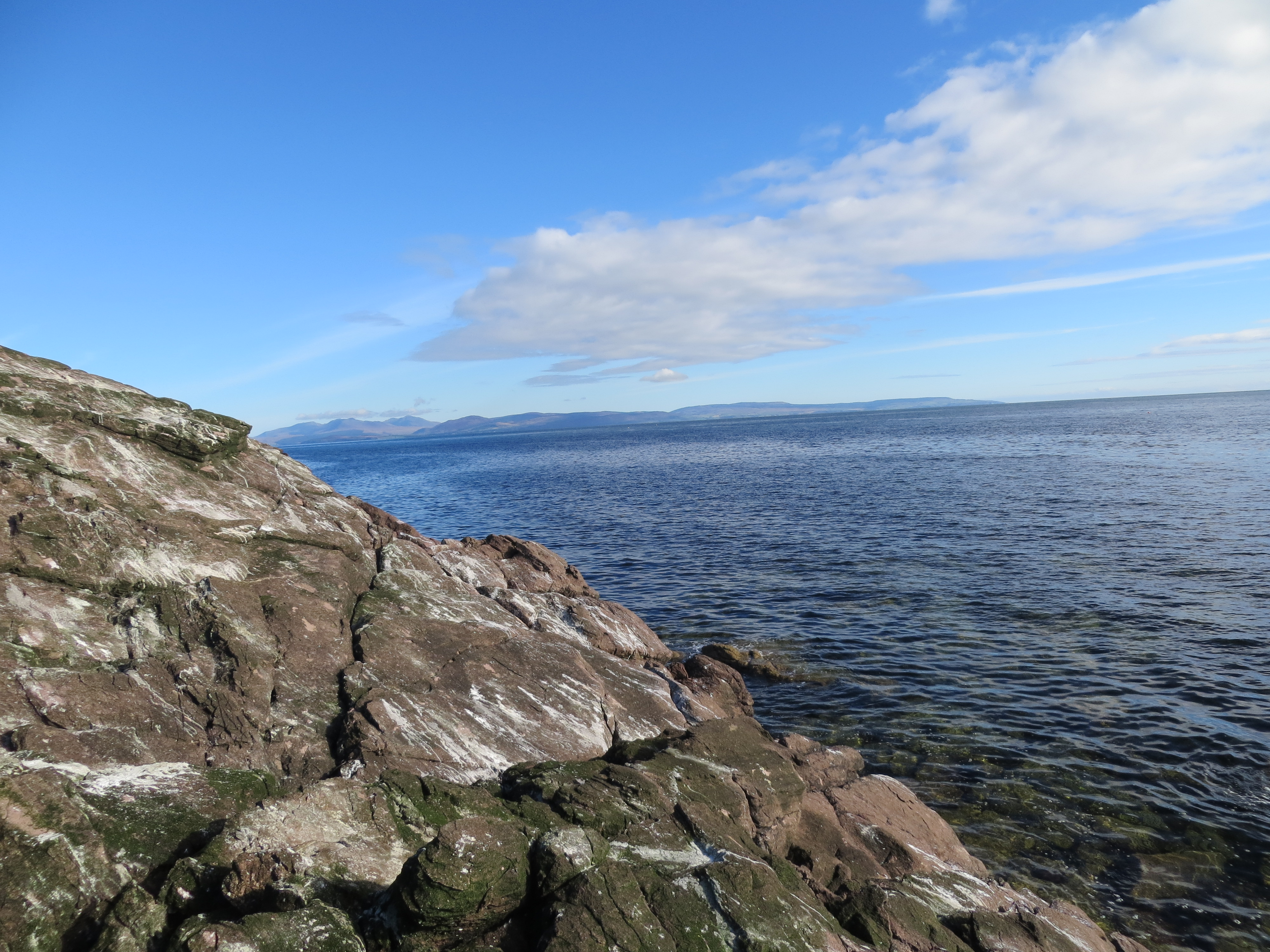
- Johnston's Point Feochaig

- Location within Scotland
- Coordinates: 55°30′N 5°35′W
- Location: Argyll and Bute, Scotland

Ramsar Wetland
- Official name: Kintyre Goose Roosts
- Designated: 28 October 1998
- Reference no.: 966

Kintyre (Scottish Gaelic: Cinn Tìre, Scottish Gaelic pronunciation: [kʲʰiɲˈtʲʰiːɾʲə]) is a peninsula in western Scotland, in the southwest of Argyll and Bute. The peninsula stretches about 30 miles (50 kilometres), from the Mull of Kintyre in the south to East and West Loch Tarbert in the north. The region immediately north of Kintyre is known as Knapdale.

Kintyre is long and narrow, at no point more than 11 miles (18 kilometres) from west coast to east coast, and is less than two miles (three kilometres) wide where it connects to Knapdale at the north. Kintyre is the lower Firth of Clyde western coast and protects the Firth from the Atlantic Ocean. The southerly tip of Kintyre is on the North Channel that separates southwestern Scotland from Northern Ireland. The east side of the Kintyre Peninsula is bounded by Kilbrannan Sound, with a number of coastal peaks such as Torr Mor. The central spine of the peninsula is mostly hilly moorland, the highest point being Beinn an Tuirc at 454 metres (1,490 feet). The coastal areas and hinterland, however, are rich and fertile. Kintyre has long been a prized area for settlers, including the early Scots who migrated from Ulster to western Scotland and the Vikings or Norsemen who conquered and settled the area just before the start of the second millennium.

The principal town of the area is Campbeltown (about 5.5 miles or 8.9 km by road from the Mull), which has been a royal burgh since the mid-18th century. The area's economy has long relied on fishing and farming, although Campbeltown has a reputation as a producer of some of the world's finest single malt whisky. Campbeltown single malts include Springbank.

Kintyre Pursuivant, one of the officers of arms at the Court of the Lord Lyon, is named after this peninsula.

== History ==
=== Beginnings ===
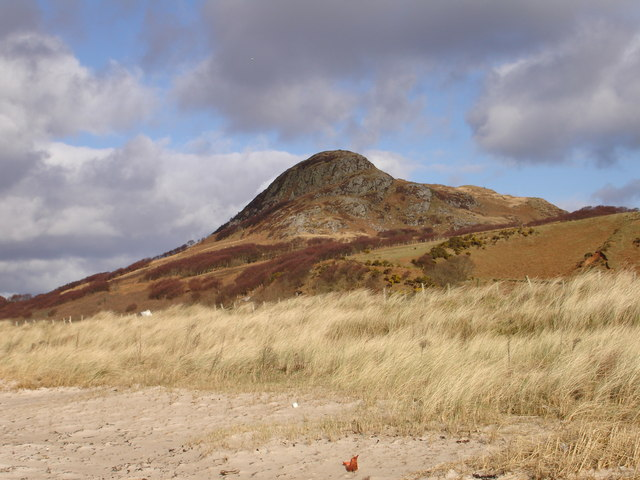
Dun Skeig

Kintyre, like Knapdale, contains several Stone Age sites; at Ballochroy is a trio of megaliths aligned with land features on the island of Jura, while a number of burial cairns still stand at Blasthill (near Southend, Argyll). Remains from the Iron Age are no less present, with the imposing Dun Skeig, a Celtic hillfort, located at the northern edge of Kintyre. The history of the presumed Pictish inhabitants of Kintyre is not recorded, but a 2nd-century BC stone fort survives at Kildonan (near Saddell), and it is not implausible that they continued to use Dun Skeig.

The tip of Kintyre is just 12 miles (19 kilometres) from Ulster, and there has long been interaction across the straits of Moyle, as evidenced by Neolithic finds in Kintyre, such as flint tools characteristic of Antrim. In the early first millennium, an Irish invasion led to Gaelic colonisation of an area centred on the Kintyre peninsula, establishing the Gaelic kingdom of Dál Riata. The latter was divided into a handful of regions, controlled by particular kin groups, of which the most powerful, the Cenél nGabráin, ruled over Kintyre, along with Knapdale, the region between Loch Awe and Loch Fyne (Craignish, Ardscotnish, Glassary, and Glenary), Arran, and Moyle (in Ulster).

The kingdom thrived for a few centuries, and formed a springboard for Christianisation of the mainland. Sanda, an island adjacent the south coast of Kintyre, is strongly associated with Ninian, the first known missionary to the Picts, and contains an early 5th century chapel said to have been built by him. In 563, Columba arrived in Kintyre, to pay his respects to the kings of Dal Riata, before continuing to Iona, where he established a base for missionary activity throughout the Pictish regions beyond.

=== Norwegian dominion ===
Dál Riata was ultimately destroyed when Norse Vikings invaded, and established their own domain, spreading more extensively over the islands north and west of the mainland. Following the unification of Norway, they had become the Norwegian Kingdom of the Isles, locally controlled by Godred Crovan, and known by Norway as Suðreyjar (Old Norse, traditionally anglicised as Sodor), meaning southern isles. The former territory of Dal Riata acquired the geographic description Argyle (now Argyll): the Gaelic coast.

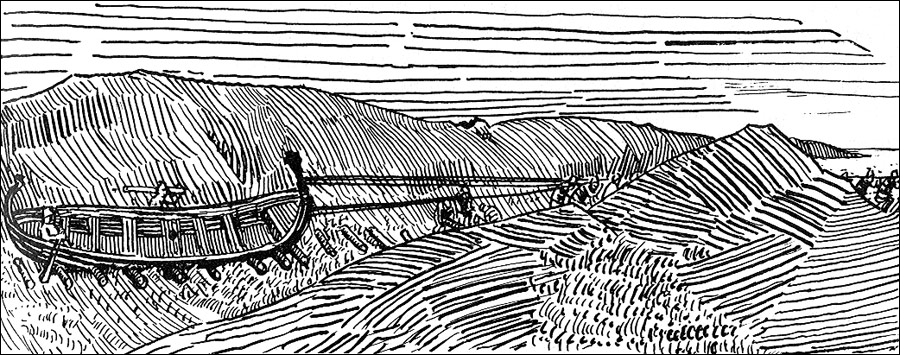
Magnus dragging his boat across the isthmus, as depicted in an 1899 book

In 1093, Magnus, the Norwegian king, launched a military campaign to assert his authority over the isles. Malcolm, the king of Scotland, responded with a written agreement, accepting that Magnus' had sovereign authority of over all the western lands that Magnus could encircle by boat. The unspecific wording led Magnus to have his boat dragged across the narrow isthmus at Tarbert, while he rode within it, so that he would thereby acquire Kintyre, in addition to the more natural islands of Arran and Bute.

Supposedly, Magnus's campaign had been part of a conspiracy against Malcolm, by Donalbain, Malcolm's younger brother. When Malcolm was killed in battle a short time later, Donalbain invaded, seized the Scottish kingdom, and displaced Malcolm's sons from the throne; on becoming king, Donalbain confirmed Magnus' gains. Donalbain's apparent keenness to do this, however, weakened his support among the nobility, and Malcolm's son, Duncan, was able to depose him.

A few years later, following a rebellion against Magnus' authority in the Isles, he launched another, fiercer, expedition. In 1098, aware of Magnus' actions, the new Scottish king, Edgar (another son of Malcolm), quitclaimed to Magnus all sovereign authority over the isles, and the whole of Kintyre and Knapdale.

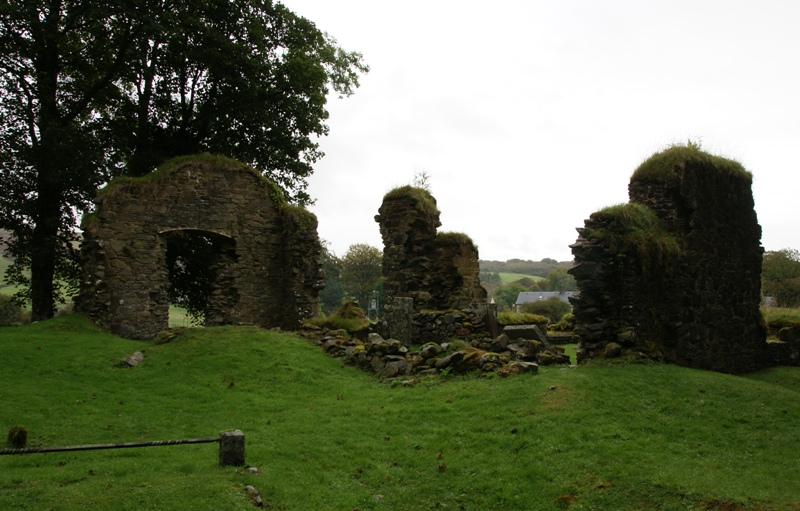
Saddell Abbey, founded by Reginald, a son of Somerled

In the mid 12th century, Somerled, the husband of Godred Crovan's granddaughter, led a successful revolt against Norway, transforming Suðreyjar (including Kintyre) into an independent kingdom. After his death, nominal Norwegian authority was re-established, but de facto authority was split between Somerled's sons and the Crovan dynasty. The exact allocation to Somerled's sons is unclear, but following a family dispute, Donald, Somerled's grandson, acquired Kintyre, together with Knapdale, Islay, and Jura. Donald's father, Reginald, established Saddell Abbey, in 1207.

In the mid 13th century, increased tension between Norway and Scotland led to a series of Battles, culminating in the Battle of Largs, shortly after which the Norwegian king died. In 1266, his more peaceable successor ceded his nominal authority over Suðreyjar to the Scottish king (Alexander III) by the Treaty of Perth, in return for a very large sum of money. Although Alexander III generally acknowledged the semi-independent authority of Somerled's heirs, he did not give them back control of the mainland territory which Scottish forces had taken during the strife, including parts of Kintyre.

=== Early Scottish rule ===
In 1293, king John Balliol established shrieval authority by creating the post of sheriff of Kintyre. Shortly after, Robert de Bruys launched a civil war challenging John for the throne. By this point, Somerled's descendants had formed into three families - the MacRory, the MacDougalls, and the MacDonalds; the MacDougalls took John's side, while the MacDonalds and MacRory backed de Bruys. When de Bruys defeated John, he declared the MacDougall lands forfeit, and gave them to the MacDonalds.

The head of the MacDonald family married the heir of the MacRory family, thereby acquiring the remaining share of Somerled's realm, and transforming it into the Lordship of the Isles, which lasted for over a century. After 4 years and 3 children, however, he divorced Amy, and married Margaret, the daughter of Robert II, the Scottish king, who gave him the remaining parts of Kintyre, along with the whole of Knapdale, as a dowry.

In 1462, however, John, the then Lord of the Isles, plotted with the English king to conquer Scotland; civil war in England delayed the discovery of this for a decade. Upon the discovery, in 1475, there was a call for forfeiture, but a year later John calmed the matter, by quitclaiming Ross (Easter, Wester, and Skye), Kintyre, and Knapdale, to Scotland.

=== The Campbells and later ===
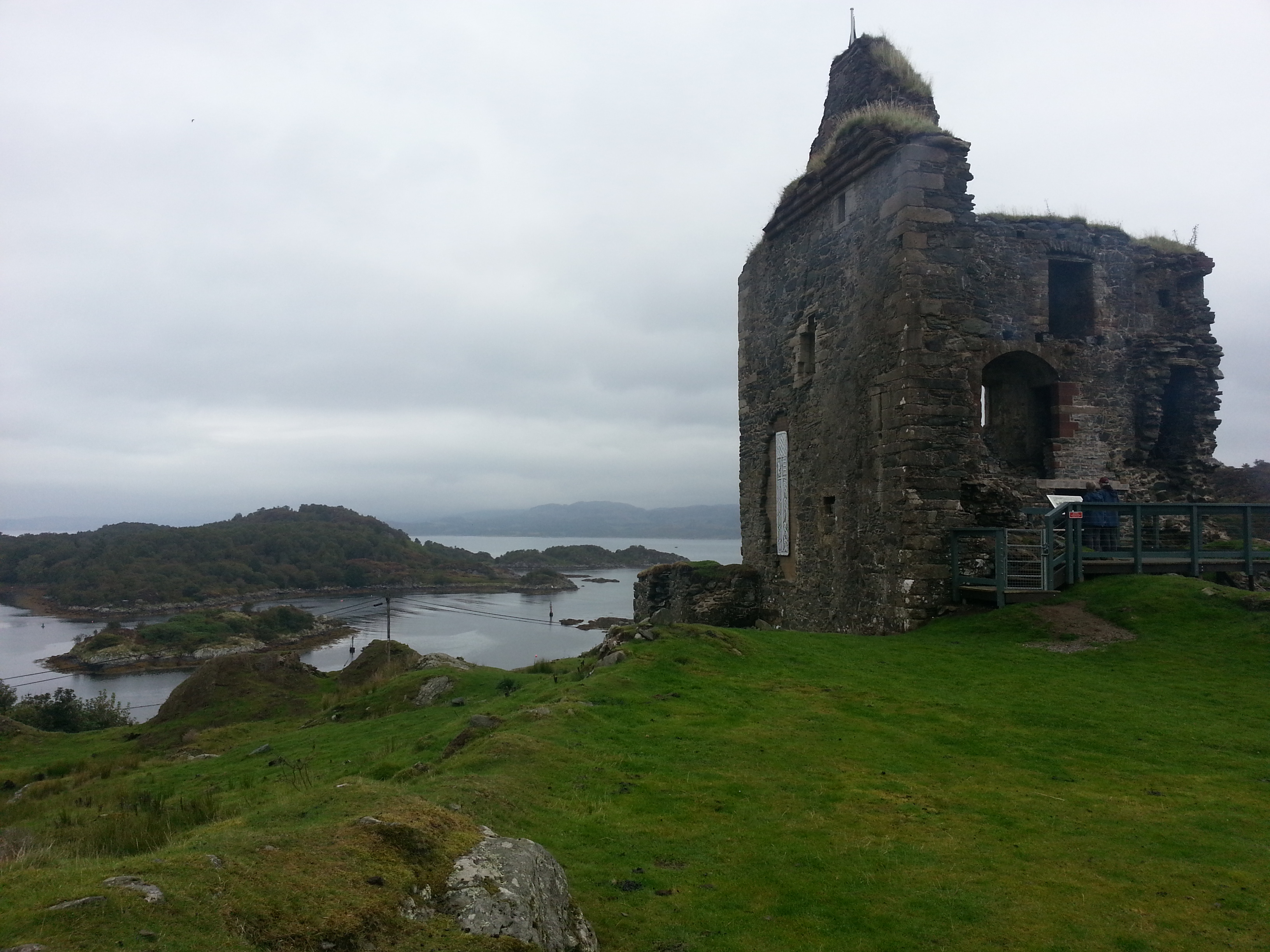
The remains of Tarbert castle

At an uncertain date before 1481, the sheriffdom of Kintyre became Tarbertshire, based at Tarbert at the northern end of Kintyre; in that year, Tarbertshire was expanded to include Knapdale. However, comital authority remained absent following the quitclaim from the Lord of the Isles; following a law and order crisis in the region, king James IV of Scotland appointed Archibald Campbell, the Earl of Argyll as governor of Tarbert Castle, with implied authority over nearby castles such as Skipness.

Following the Scottish Reformation, the MacDonalds (opponents) and Campbells (supporters) came into more direct dispute. In 1607, after a series of hostile actions by the MacDonalds, King James VI ordered their lands in Kintyre to be transferred to Archibald Campbell, heir of the earlier Archibald. Under pressure from the Campbells, the sheriff court moved to Inveraray at the extreme northeast of Tarbertshire, near the heart of Campbell power; somewhat inevitably, in 1633 shrieval authority was annexed by the sheriff of Argyll.

Archibald's son, a dedicated supporter of the religious reformers, developed a plan to establish a large settlement, around the village of Kinlochkilkerran, at the south of Kintyre, composed of loyal Presbyterians from Lowland Scotland, in order to outnumber and undermine the local Catholic population, and reduce resistance to the state's religious reforms. Under his son, Archibald, this became Campbeltown. Their actions also had the effect of diluting Gaelic culture, gradually replacing it with a Lowlands one.

Comital powers were abolished by the Heritable Jurisdictions Act, leaving only the shrieval unit. In 1899, counties were formally created, on shrieval boundaries, by a Scottish Local Government Act; Kintyre became part of the County of Argyll. Following late 20th century reforms, it is now within the wider region of Argyll and Bute.

== Towns and villages in Kintyre ==
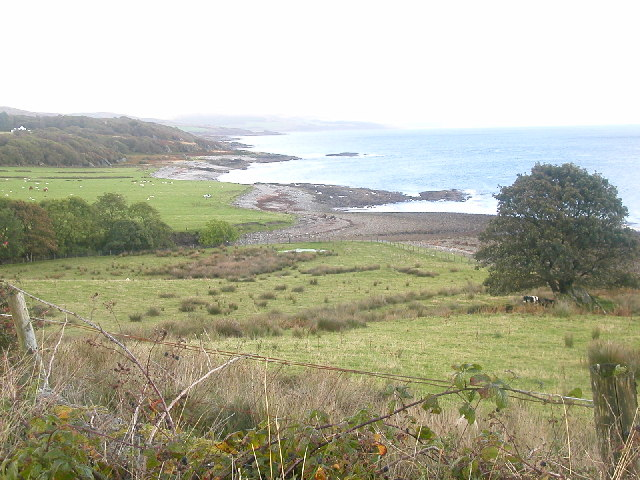
The north-eastern coast of the Kintyre peninsula looking northward to Skipness and the Sound of Bute

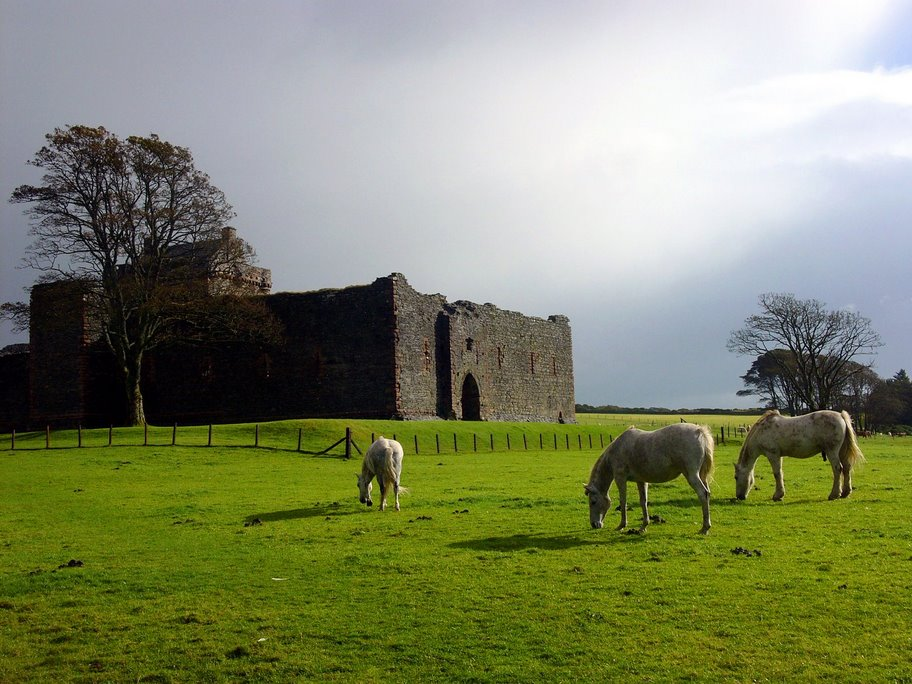
Skipness Castle

- Achinhoan
- Bellochantuy
- Campbeltown
- Carradale
- Clachan
- Claonaig
- Dippen
- Drumlemble
- Glenbarr
- Grogport
- Kennacraig
- Kilchenzie
- Killean
- Machrihanish
- Muasdale
- Peninver
- Saddell
- Skipness
- Southend
- Stewarton
- Tarbert
- Tayinloan
- Torrisdale
- West Tarbert
- Whitehouse

== Transport ==
Information on all forms of public transport is available from Traveline Scotland.

=== Bus and coach services ===
- Long-distance coach services to and from Glasgow are operated by West Coast Motors on behalf of Scottish Citylink
- Bus services throughout the Kintyre peninsula are operated by West Coast Motors alone.

=== Flights ===
- Available between Glasgow International Airport and Campbeltown Airport

=== Ferry services ===
- Operated by Caledonian MacBrayne on the following routes:
  - Claonaig - Lochranza (in summer)
  - Kennacraig - Islay
  - Tarbert - Lochranza (in winter)
  - Tarbert - Portavadie
  - Tayinloan - Gigha
- Operated by Kintyre Express:
  - Campbeltown - Ballycastle, County Antrim

=== Railways ===
No railways remain in use today. From 1876 until 1931 the Campbeltown and Machrihanish Light Railway operated, initially built to transport coal.

== Places of historic interest ==
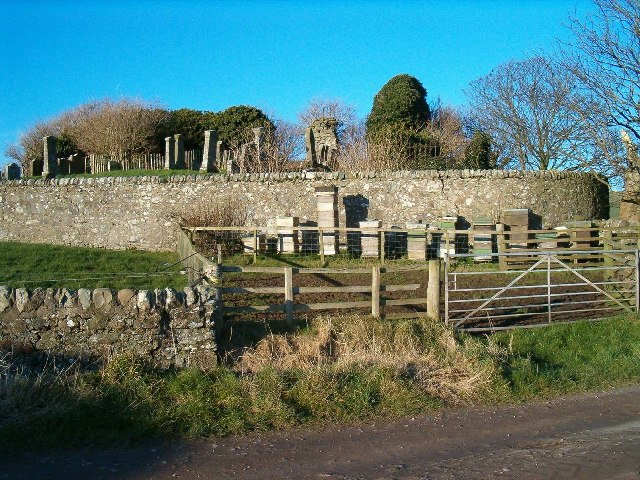
Ruins of the old church at Kilchenzie with beehives below

- Clachan Church - carved medieval grave slabs
- Kilchenzie church
- Kilchousland Chapel, near Peninver
- Kilcomkill, Southend - St Columba's Chapel, carved grave slabs, "St. Columba's footprints" nearby
- Killean - St. John's Church - "most important medieval parish church in Kintyre" - carved grave slabs
- 18th century Killean and Kilchenzie Church (united parish) at A'Chleit
- Saddell Abbey
- Saddell Castle
- Skipness Castle
- Tarbert Castle

=== Prehistoric sites ===
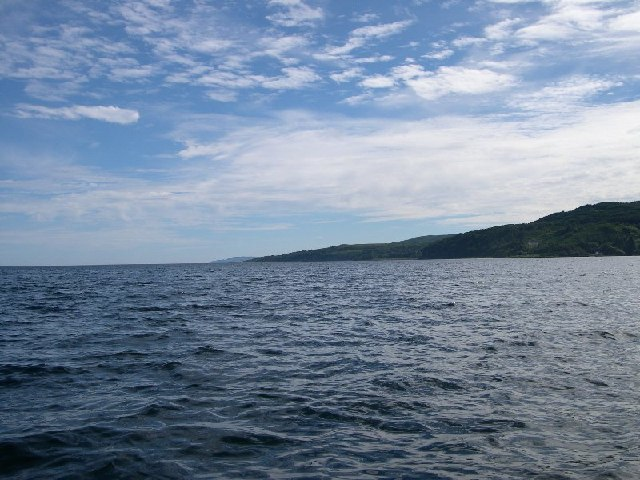
Kintyre Peninsula visible from Torrisdale Bay

- Avinagillan standing stone
- Ballochroy standing stones
- Beacharr standing stone, near Tayinloan
- Corriechrevie cairn - intact
- Dun Skeig - Iron Age forts near Clachan
- Kildonan galleried dun
- A crag near the chapel of Keil and St. Columba's Well, between Dunaverty Bay and Carskey in Kintyre, has two footprints carved at a place where St. Columba is reputed to have first set foot in Dál Riata, Scotland. One is recent and the other genuinely old. Kingship rituals may have been connected with this petrosomatoglyph.

== Associated peerage titles ==
- Duke of Kintyre (extinct)
- Marquess of Kintyre and Lorne (subsidiary title of the Duke of Argyll)

== Test ==
The Mull of Kintyre test is, according to an urban legend, an unofficial guideline to classify erections in film and TV by the British Board of Film Classification for the censorship of adult films and images.

== See also ==
- Kildonald Bay
- Kintyre Way

== Related songs ==
- The best known of these is Paul McCartney's 1977 track "Mull of Kintyre", performed by Wings. The song was written in tribute to the picturesque peninsula, where McCartney has owned High Park Farm since 1966, and its headland or Mull of Kintyre. The song was Wings' biggest hit in the United Kingdom where it became Christmas number one, and was the first single to sell over two million copies in the United Kingdom.
