= Henry Kendall Ltd v William Lillico Ltd =

English contract law case

- Court: House of Lords
- Citation: [1969] 2 AC 31
- Transcript

Court membership
- Judges sitting: Lord Reid, Lord Morris of Borth-y-Gest, Lord Guest, Lord Pearce, Lord Wilberforce

Keywords
- Incorporation

Henry Kendall Ltd v William Lillico Ltd [1969] 2 AC 31 is an English contract law case concerning the incorporation of contract terms through a course of dealings.

== Facts ==
Animal food was sold by merchants to a farmer. It was defective. The merchants brought in suppliers, and they in turn brought in their suppliers, a long chain. (hence also Hardwick Game v Suffolk Agricultural Poultry Producers Association). Purchases three or four times a month had happened for three or so years, and each time, a sold note followed, which said the buyer took responsibility for any latent defects. The buyers had never read the note.

== Judgment ==
The House of Lords held that a reasonable seller in the circumstances would have had good cause to assume that the buyer agreed to the term, hence rejecting Lord Devlin’s McCutcheon dicta that previous dealings needed to prove actual knowledge.

== See also ==
- English contract law
