= West Loch Tarbert, Argyll =

Loch in Argyll and Bute, Scotland

West Loch Tarbert
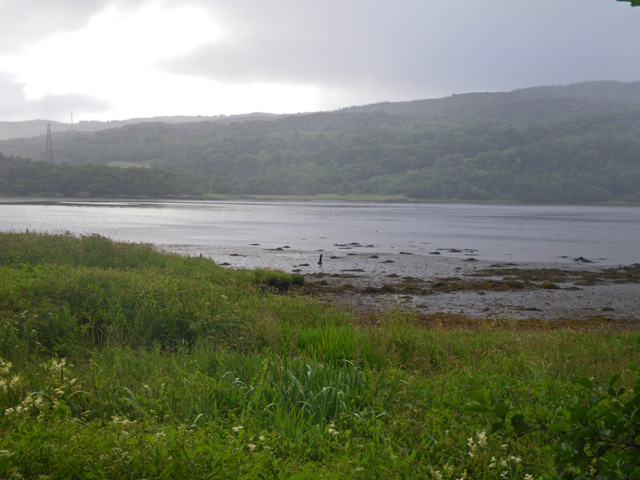
- West Loch Tarbert viewed from the western shore.

- Location within Scotland
- Location: Kintyre Peninsula, Argyll and Bute
- Coordinates: 55°48′0″N 5°30′30″W
- Frozen: No

West Loch Tarbert is a long, narrow sea loch on the western side of the Kintyre Peninsula, in Argyll and Bute, west of Scotland.

== Geography ==
The head of the loch lies near the village of Tarbert and it reaches the open sea at Ardpatrick Point some 15 kilometres (9.3 mi) distant.

The island of Eilean Ceann na Creige, off the south shore, is connected to the mainland by a causeway. It is a ferry terminal for island of Islay.

== History ==
Around the year 1093, Magnus Barefoot, King of Norway had his longship dragged across the isthmus at Tarbert between West Loch Tarbert and East Loch Tarbert as part of a campaign to increase his possessions in the Hebrides. He made an arrangement with King Malcolm III of Scotland that he could take possession of land on the west coast around which a ship could sail. Magnus declared that Kintyre had "better land than the best of the Hebrides", and by taking command of his ship's tiller and "sailing" across the isthmus he was able to claim the entire peninsula, which remained under Norse rule for more than a dozen years as a result.

== Ferry services ==
In the 1960s, Western Ferries began operating a car ferry, with a simple stern-loading ramp, from Kennacraig on the south shore. This served Port Askaig on Islay, in competition with the mail steamer, operated by MacBraynes from West Tarbert near the head of the loch. The new service soon won a significant share of the traffic and stimulated MacBraynes to modernise the Islay route. In January 1970, hoist-loading MV Arran was transferred from the Clyde. She gave two daily return sailings, one each to Port Ellen and Port Askaig, as well as sailings to Craighouse on Jura, Gigha and Colonsay. Over the winter 1972/73, Arran's hoist and side-ramps were removed, along with the superstructure aft of them. She was converted to a stern-loading vessel, with a stern ramp and an open car deck. In this guise, she took on a new timetable – three double crossings a day between modified terminals at Port Ellen and West Loch Tarbert. Port Askaig was left to Western Ferries.

With the introduction of MV Pioneer in August 1974, CalMac started to win back Islay traffic. Over the next five years Pioneer became well established, running to Port Ellen and Gigha. In 1978, Caledonian MacBrayne took over the Western Ferries terminal at Kennacraig, with the deeper-draught MV Iona, again providing a service to both Port Ellen and Port Askaig, as well as calling at Gigha. In 1989, the more spacious, MV Claymore became the Islay ship, with the drive-through MV Isle of Arran taking over in 1993. MV Hebridean Isles became the main Islay vessel in 2001, with MV Finlaggan replacing Isle of Arran in 2011 and relegating Hebridean Isles to the second Islay vessel.
