= Kennacraig =

Coordinates: 55.803296°N 5.4736237°W

Kennacraig: Scottish Gaelic: Ceann na Creige
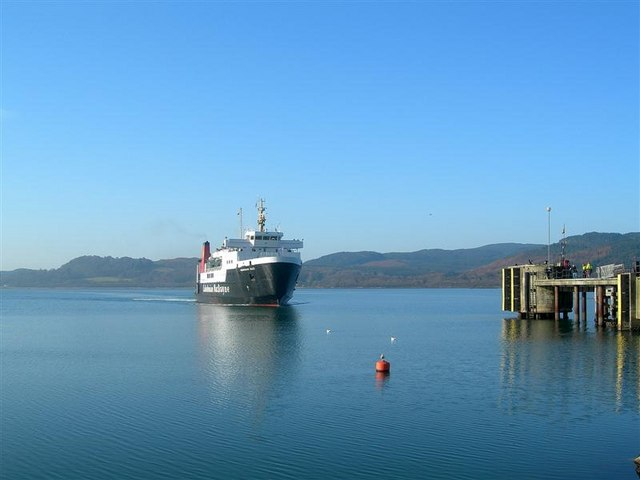
- The Caledonian MacBrayne ferry MV Hebridean Isles arriving at Kennacraig.

- Location within Argyll and Bute
- OS grid reference: NR 82400 62130
- Council area: Argyll and Bute
- Lieutenancy area: Argyll and Bute
- Country: Scotland
- Sovereign state: United Kingdom
- Post town: TARBERT
- Postcode district: PA29
- Dialling code: 01880
- UK Parliament: Argyll, Bute and South Lochaber
- Scottish Parliament: Argyll and Bute

Kennacraig (Scottish Gaelic: Ceann na Creige) is a hamlet situated on West Loch Tarbert, a five miles (eight kilometres) southwest of Tarbert on the Kintyre peninsula, Argyll and Bute, in the west of Scotland.

== Ferry terminal ==
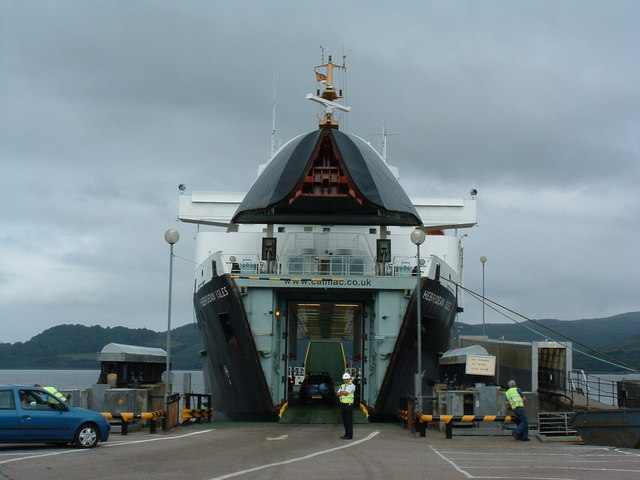
Kennacraig to Islay ferry

Caledonian MacBrayne ferries sail from the terminal, on the rocky islet Eilean Ceann na Creige, to Port Ellen or Port Askaig on Islay, and also to Colonsay during the summer season.

Western Ferries started a car ferry to Islay from 7 April 1968 and CalMac took over in 1978, having previously used West Loch Tarbert.

Preceding station	Ferry	Following station
Terminus	Caledonian MacBrayne; Islay Ferry	Port Ellen
Terminus	Caledonian MacBrayne; Islay Ferry	Port Askaig
