= Flying Phantom (disambiguation) =

Flying Phantom can refer to:

- Flying Phantom, a tug built in 1981 for the Clyde Shipping Company that sank on the River Clyde in 2007
- Flying Phantom (catamaran), a one-design catamaran built for planing over L-shaped daggerboards
- Flying Phantom Ship, a 1969 anime feature film directed by Hiroshi Ikeda and produced by Toei Animation.
