= Ferry fiasco =

Ferry fiasco may refer to

- Scottish ferry fiasco
- Fast ferry scandal
