= Ferguson Marine =

Shipyard located in Port Glasgow on the River Clyde in Scotland

Ferguson Marine (Port Glasgow) Limited
- Type: State owned
- Industry: Shipbuilding
- Founded: 1903
- Headquarters: Port Glasgow, Inverclyde, Scotland
- Key people: Duncan Anderson, Interim Chair; Graeme Thomson (CEO)
- Products: Shipbuilding, ship repair and manufacturing
- Owner: Scottish Government
- Number of employees: Over 400
- Parent: Lithgows (1961–1970); Scott Lithgow (1970–1977); British Shipbuilders (1977–1989) Clyde Blowers Capital (2014–2019)
- Website: Ferguson Marine

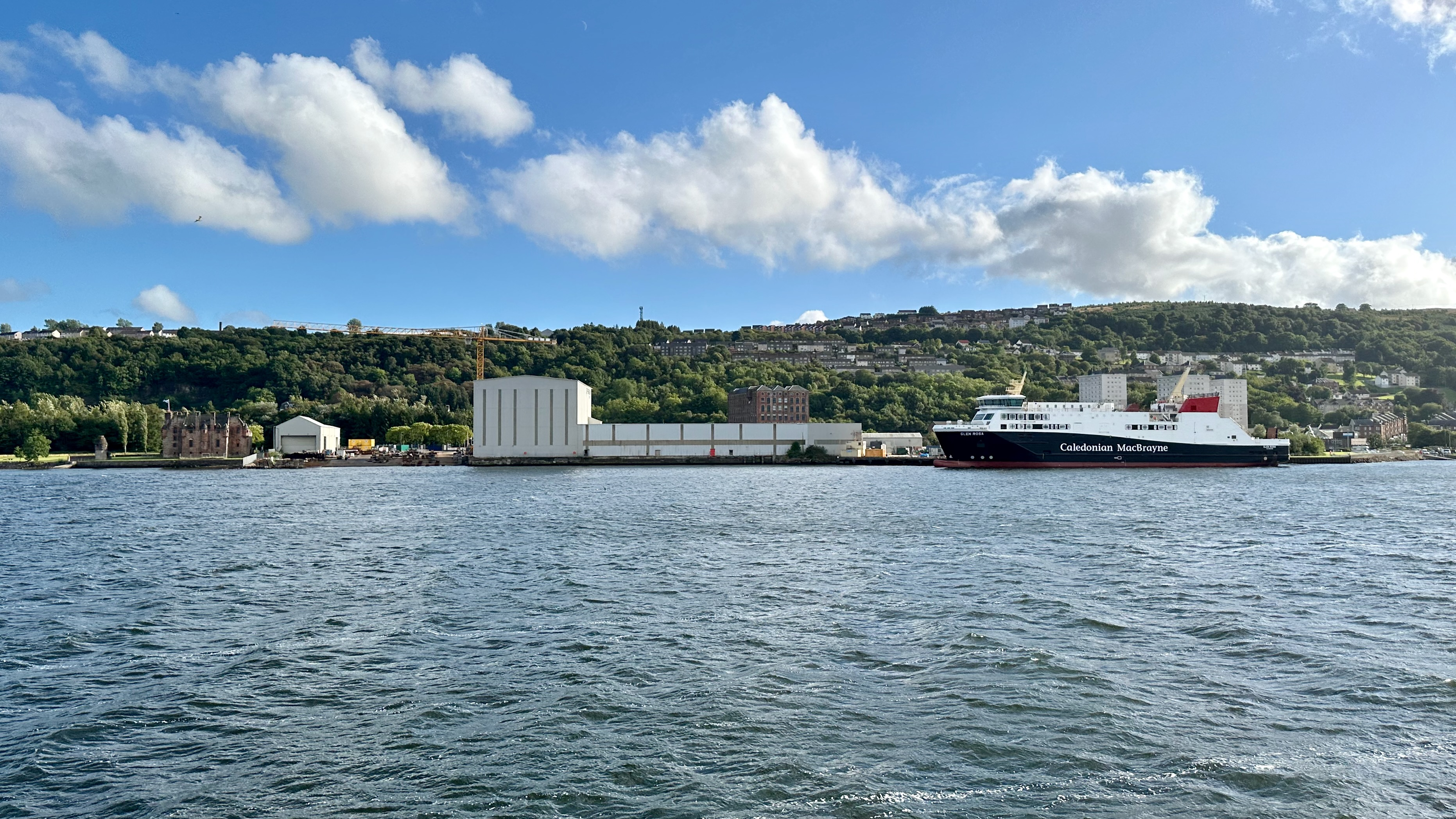
Ferguson Marine in 2024, with Glen Rosa at Newark Quay

Ferguson Marine (Port Glasgow) Limited is a shipbuilding company whose yard, located in Port Glasgow on the Firth of Clyde in Scotland, was established in 1903. It is the last remaining shipbuilder on the lower Clyde and is currently the only builder of merchant ships on the river.

For some years the company's mainstay has been Roll-on/roll-off ferries, primarily for Caledonian MacBrayne (CalMac), including a series of hybrid diesel-electric/battery-powered vessels. Beset with difficulties since 2018 over their latest two CalMac ferries, Fergusons' largest ever vessel, the shipyard was nationalised in December 2019. It is now classified as an executive non-departmental public body of the Scottish Government.

== History ==
=== Ferguson Brothers ===
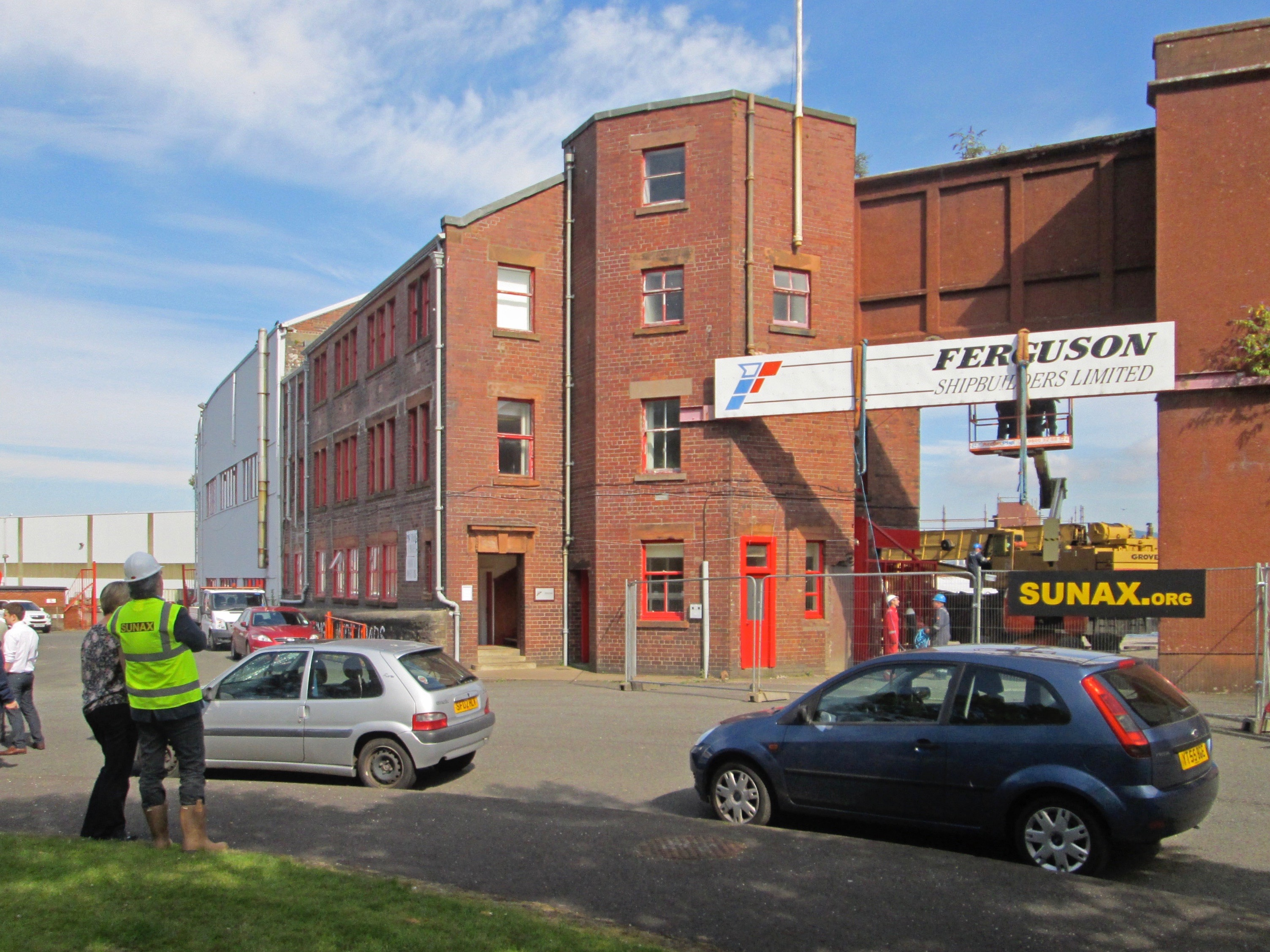
Entrance to Ferguson Shipbuilders, with original office building and fabrication shed

The Ferguson shipyard was founded as a partnership by four brothers, (Peter, Daniel, Louis and Robert) who left the Fleming & Ferguson shipyard in Paisley to lease the Newark yard in Port Glasgow in March 1903. The first vessel built by Messrs. Ferguson Brothers in the yard was the tug Flying Swift, launched on 26 October 1903. Ferguson Brothers acquired the freehold in the yard in 1907 and was incorporated as Ferguson Brothers (Port Glasgow) Ltd in 1912. The company was purchased by John Slater Ltd (Amalgamated Industries) in 1918 but returned to control of the Ferguson family in the late 1920s. Lithgows Ltd purchased an interest in the business after Bobby Ferguson's death in 1954 and took control of the Company in 1961. Ferguson Brothers remained a separate entity within the Scott Lithgow group from 1969 to 1977.

The company was nationalised and subsumed into British Shipbuilders in 1977, then merged with the Ailsa Shipbuilding Company to form Ferguson-Ailsa Ltd in 1980.

=== Ferguson Shipbuilders Ltd ===
Ferguson and Ailsa were separated in 1986 when the latter yard was sold and Ferguson was merged with Appledore Shipbuilders in Devon to form Appledore Ferguson Shipbuilders Ltd. By the late 1980s only the Appledore Ferguson yards were still held in state ownership. Ferguson was demerged from Appledore and acquired by Greenock-based engineering firm Clark Kincaid in 1989 then started trading as Ferguson Shipbuilders.

Clark Kincaid itself was acquired by Kvaerner and became Kvaerner Kincaid in 1990, and the Ferguson yard sold to Ferguson Marine plc in 1991. The entire shareholding in Ferguson Marine was acquired by the Holland House Electrical Group in 1995. The sign above the main gate continued the name Ferguson Shipbuilders Limited. After they encountered difficulty in maintaining a flow of work, a Scottish Executive cabinet meeting on 1 June 2005 discussed news that orders for fishery protection vessels and a CalMac ferry had been won by the Remontowa shipyard in Gdańsk. The environment and rural affairs minister Ross Finnie said "If the contracts were awarded to the Rementowa (Polish) yard, there were no other orders in prospect for the Clydeside shipyard and since the launch of its last ship a month previously, the yard had declined to a state that was close to irreversible." The cabinet noted "with concern the outlook for the Ferguson shipyard". In August 2005 Fergusons laid off 100 members of staff, and this was discussed by Finnie at a cabinet meeting. The minutes of the meeting record that "It was difficult to explain to Scottish taxpayers why public funds were being used to buy a vessel from Poland and make redundancy payments to shipbuilders in Port Glasgow."

Between 2013 and 2016 the yard built three hybrid diesel-electric/battery powered ferries, beginning with Hallaig - the world's first.

=== Ferguson Marine Engineering Limited ===
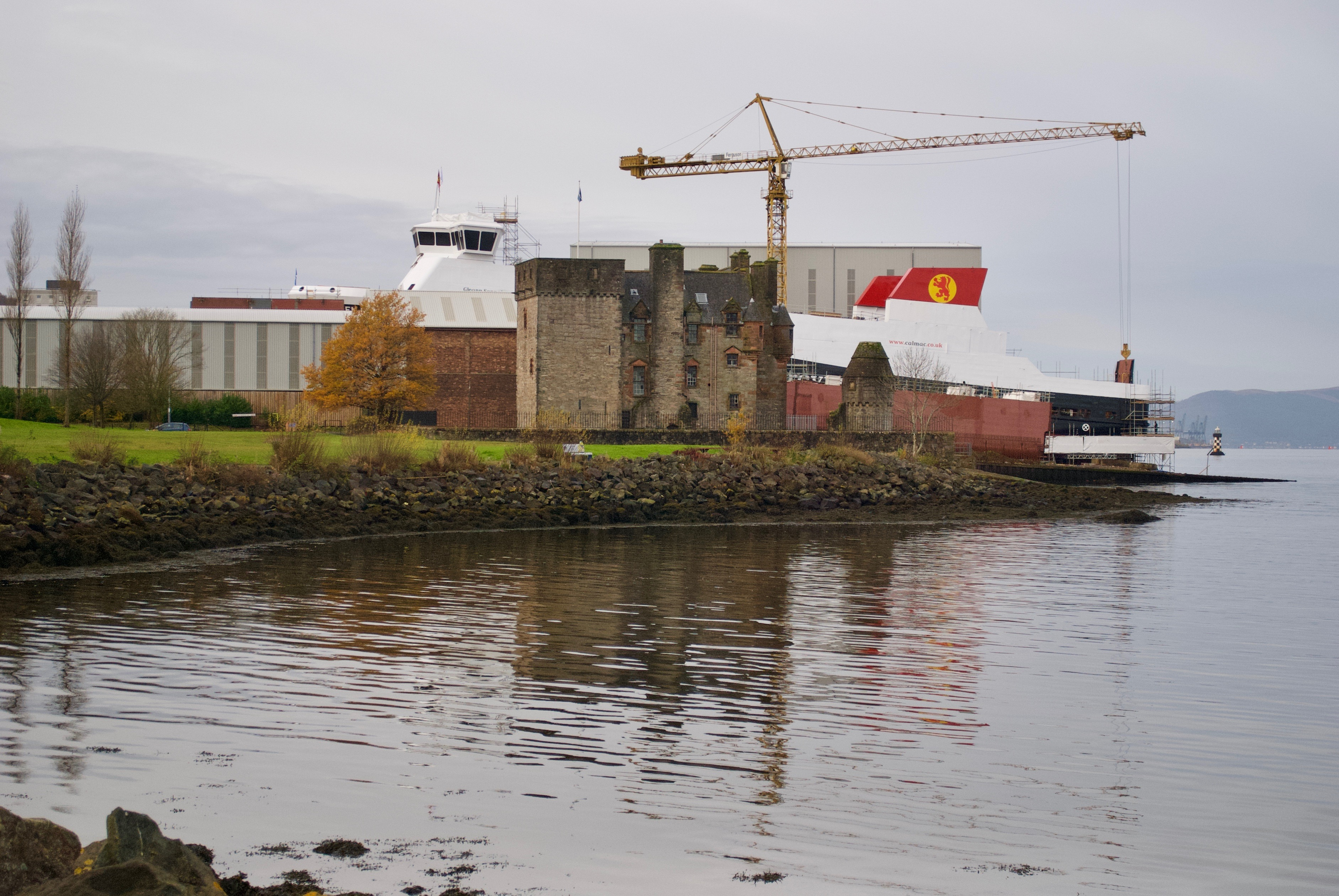
Ferguson Marine Engineering from the east, behind Newark Castle, prior to the November 2017 launch of the Glen Sannox

In August 2014, the shipyard placed the company into administration and the following month Clyde Blowers Capital, an industrial company owned by Jim McColl, purchased the yard for £600,000 and renamed it Ferguson Marine Engineering Limited (FMEL).

In August 2015, government-owned Caledonian Maritime Assets Limited (CMAL) announced that an order for two ferries for Caledonian MacBrayne service, capable of operating on either marine diesel oil or liquefied natural gas, had been won by Fergusons. Originally intended for delivery during 2018, construction difficulties (the reasons for which are in dispute) led to a two-year delay for the first ship, Glen Sannox, which was launched in November 2017.

FMEL was part of two consortia's bids for the programme for five type 31 frigates for the Royal Navy, worth some £1.25 billion. The consortia are those led by Babcock International and Atlas Elektronik UK. After their bid was selected, a contract was formally awarded to Babcock Group on 15 November 2019, for an average production cost of £250 million per ship and an overall programme cost set to be £2 billion.

On 30 October 2018, FMEL secured a contract to construct a large air cushioned barge for Mangistau ACV Solutions Ltd, part of the CMI Offshore Ltd Group, with estimated completion scheduled in 2019. In December 2018 FMEL announced that two orders worth £5.4 million had been secured from Inverlussa Marine Services for fish farm support vessels, to be completed in May 2019, and that three more for fishing vessels, totaling £11 million, were in the pipeline. Cutting first steel on the Inverlusa order began in early 2019, but by July 2019 the ferry dispute had led to delays in closing the trawler contracts.

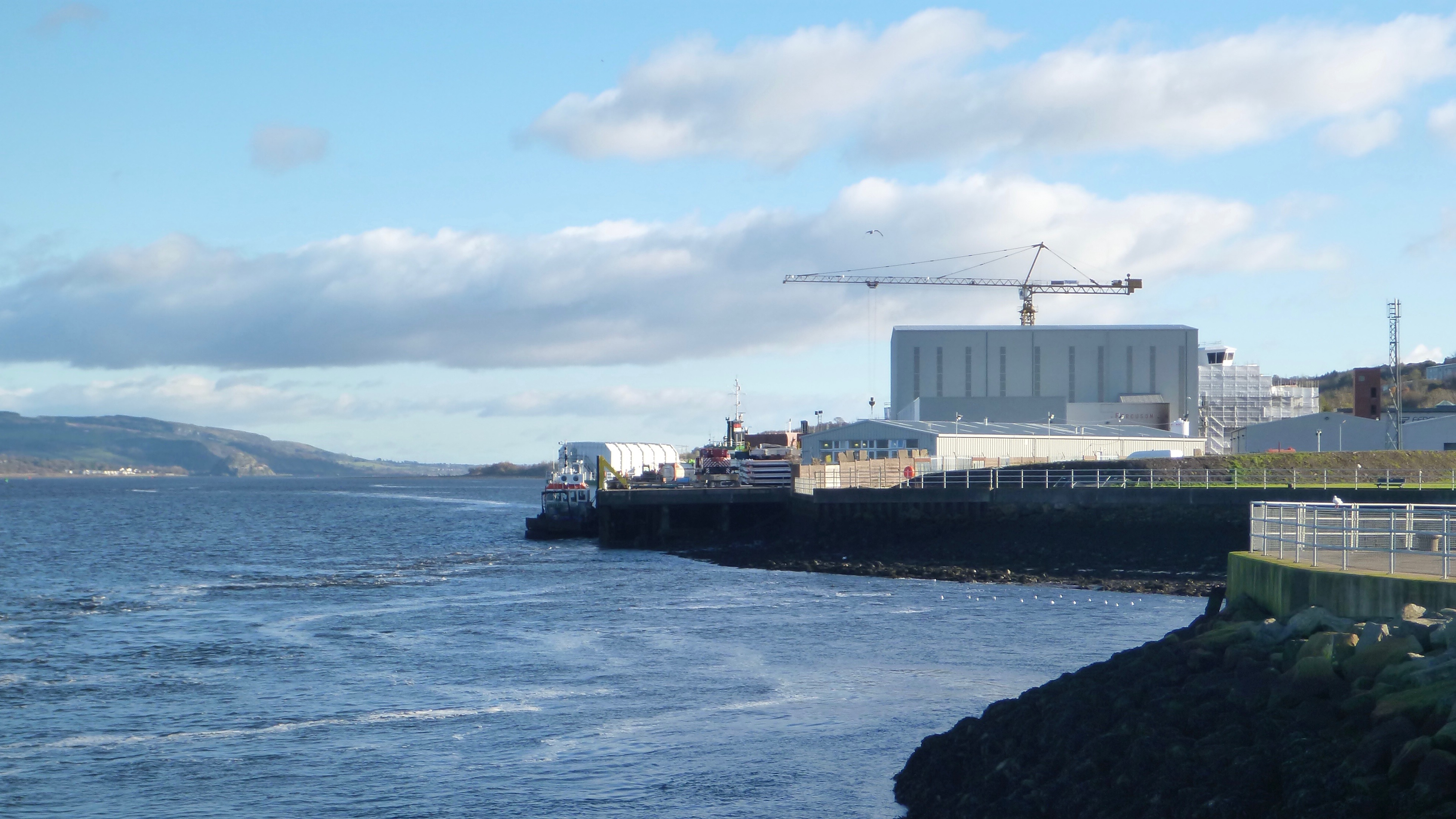
Ferguson Marine from the west, Newark Quay seen across Coronation Park in 2017

Attempts by Clyde Blowers Capital to negotiate with the Scottish Government over increased costs and delays to ferries failed, and on 9 August 2019 the directors of FMEL gave notice that the company would be put into administration. This led to a bitter dispute between the Scottish Government and the former owners of the shipyard. On 16 August Finance Secretary Derek Mackay visited the yard to announce that the Scottish Government would take over management of Ferguson Marine to allow work to continue on current orders, and that if no private buyer could be found in four weeks, the yard would be nationalised by purchase. The government appointed marine engineer Tim Hair as turnaround director. At the start of December, after three private bids to purchase the yard were rejected as being insufficiently favourable to creditors, the government formally took ownership of the shipyard, and in the process wrote off about £50 million of previous loans.

=== Ferguson Marine (Port Glasgow) Ltd. ===
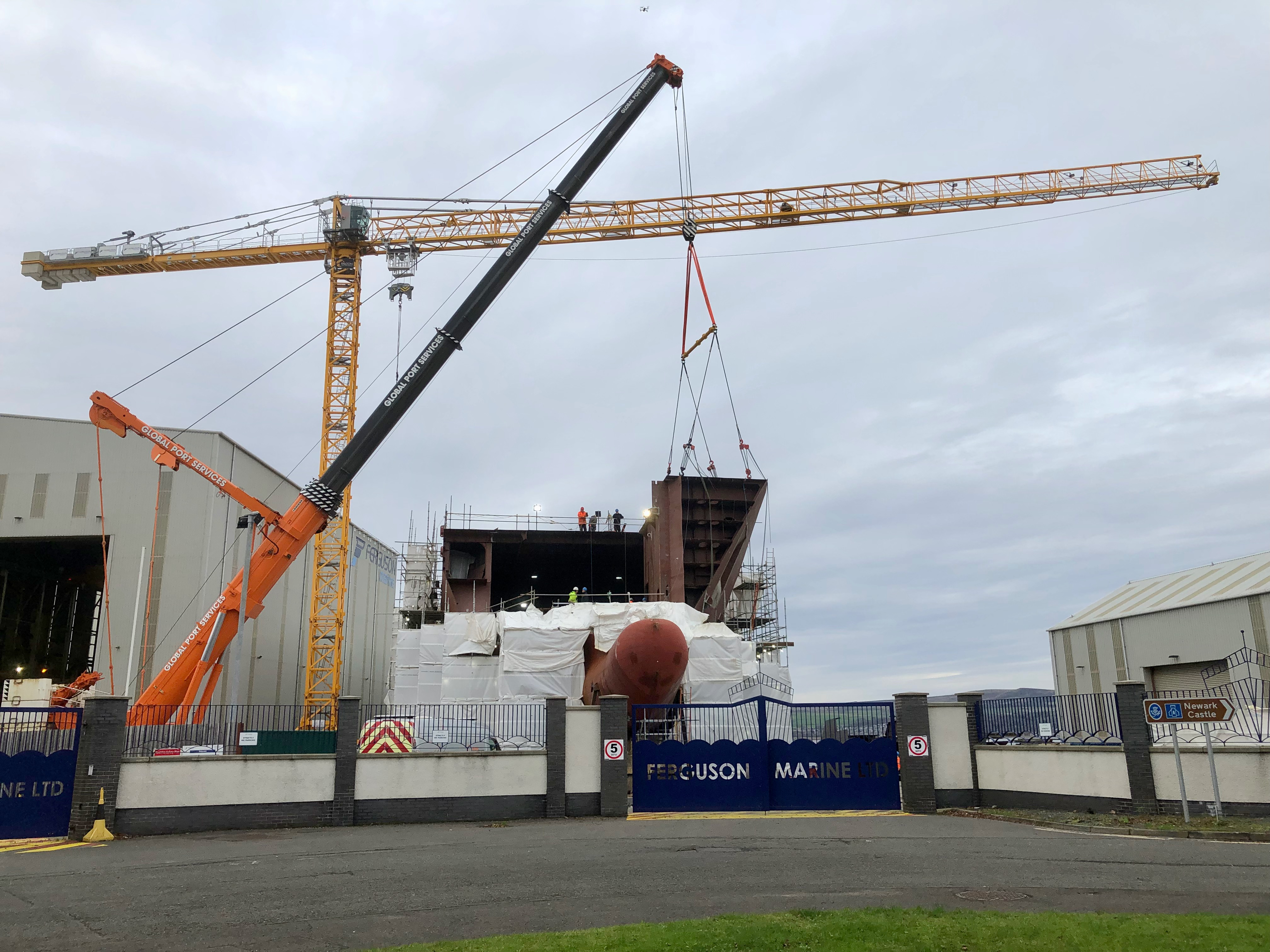
Shipyard entrance in 2021, mobile crane lifts section onto Hull 802

The commercial transaction nationalising the shipyard was completed on 2 December 2019, making it a new business named Ferguson Marine (Port Glasgow) Ltd..

The costs and viability of completing contracts was investigated, and on 22 January 2020 turnaround director Tim Hair told a Scottish Parliament inquiry that the large ferries MV Glen Sannox and Hull 802 were "significantly less than half built", with 95% of their design still to be agreed with the client body Caledonian Maritime Assets. Additional naval architects and marine engineers had been engaged to complete this design work.

The vessels for Inverlussa Marine Services were built in the large prefabrication shed. The 21-metre fish farm workboat was named Helen Rice in a launch ceremony on 27 January 2020 attended by Scotland's finance and economy secretary Derek Mackay, then lifted by crane into the water on 29 January. Sea trials and delivery were completed in March. That month, Ferguson Marine announced that they had taken a four year lease on a large warehouse sited at Greenock waterfront, and would use it to consolidate stock and materials which had been stored in several warehouses near Glasgow Airport. The large air cushioned barge for CMI Offshore Ltd (ordered from FMEL in 2018) was launched on 24 June 2020, to be taken to the Caspian Sea to be completed and outfitted for oil exploration work in that area.

The company's board of directors with six non–executive members, including Alistair Mackenzie as chairman, was appointed in June 2020 by the Scottish Government Cabinet Secretary Fiona Hyslop.

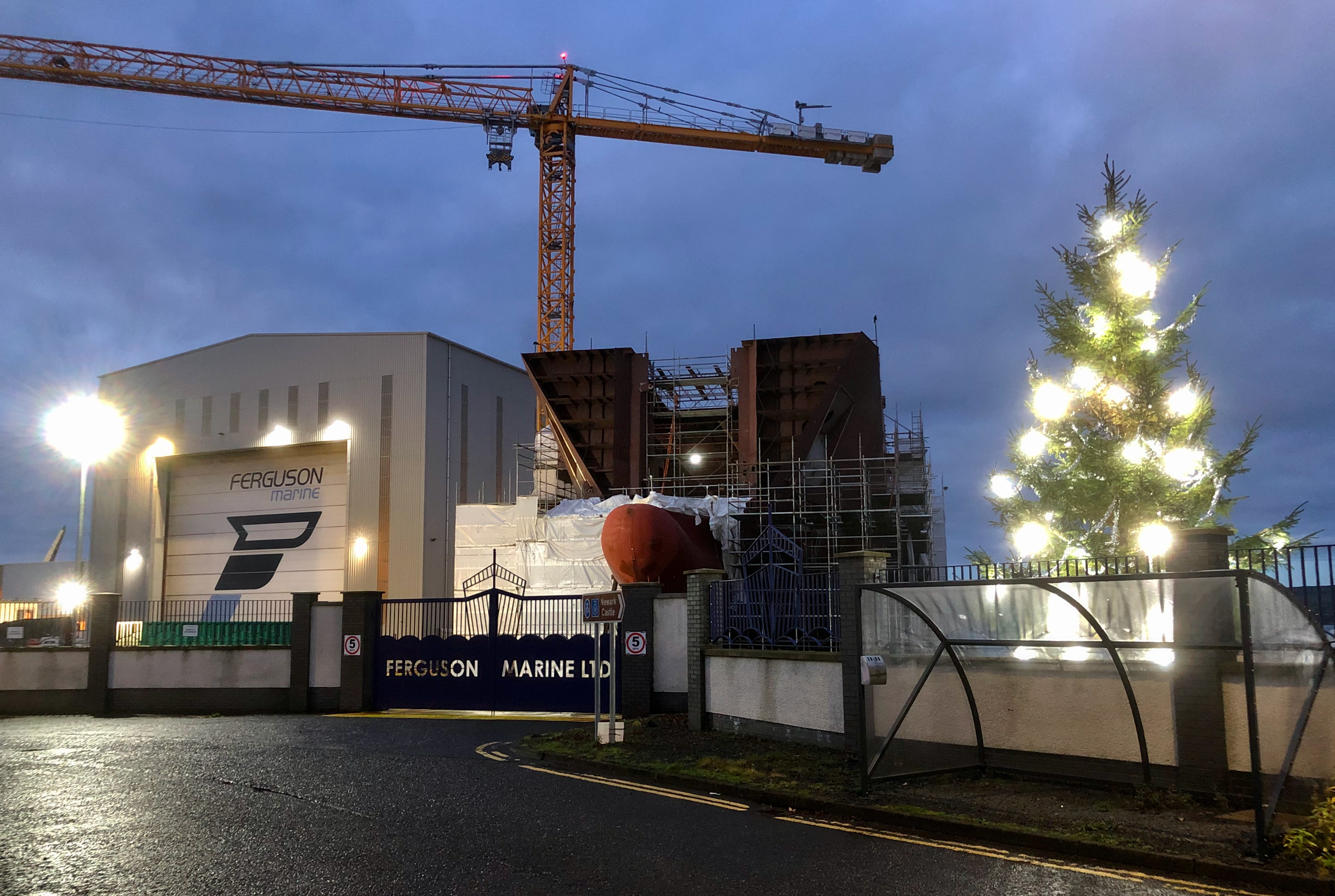
Hull 802 in December 2021

In February 2021, the firm announced it would take on 120 additional workers with the intention of operating seven days per week. On 15 March the 26-metre fish treatment workboat for Inverlussa was airbag launched, and named Kallista Helen.

The bulbous bow of Hull 802 was fitted in September 2021, and reported as a landmark in significant progress to both ships, deliveries of which by January 2022 were running up to five years late.

Fergusons had bid for two new ferries to be ordered by CMAL, but was not included on the shortlist to submit detailed tenders. On 16 December David Tydeman was appointed chief executive, to take over from Tim Hair in February 2022.

On 16 March 2023, Tydeman wrote to Scottish Ministers requesting a reset of the timetable for delivery of the two ferries to no later than end 2023 for Glen Sannox (Hull 801) and no later than end 2024 for Hull 802. The shipyard is aiming to delivering earlier – Glen Sannox in autumn 2023 and Hull 802 before late summer 2024.

In May 2023, Ferguson announced that it had secured an initial contract with BAE Systems to fabricate three steel units for HMS Belfast, the third City Class Type 26 frigate currently being constructed by BAE Systems.

In July 2025, Ferguson signed a contract with BAE Systems to fabricate three structural components for HMS Birmingham, the fourth City Class Type 26 frigate currently being constructed by BAE Systems.

== Vessels built ==
=== Ferguson Marine (FMEL 2014–2019, FMPG since 2019) ===
Reference
Yard No.	Name	Type	Launch	Ordered By	Length x Breadth	Notes
727	MV Catriona	Double Ended diesel electric hybrid RoPax Ferry	11 December 2015	Caledonian Maritime Assets	43.5 x 12.2m	
801	MV Glen Sannox	LNG/marine diesel hybrid RoPax Ferry	21 November 2017	Caledonian Maritime Assets	102.4 x 17m	Ferry fiasco
802	MV Glen Rosa	LNG/marine diesel hybrid RoPax Ferry	9 April 2024	Caledonian Maritime Assets	102.4 x 17m	Ferry fiasco
803	ACB Argymak	Air Cushion Barge	24 June 2020	Mangistau ACV Solutions Ltd (part of CMI Offshore Ltd Group)	55 x 24m	
804	MV Helen Rice	Aquaculture Support Vessel	29 January 2020	Inverlussa Marine Services	21 x 8.35 m	
805	MV Kallista Helen	Aquaculture Support Vessel	15 March 2021	Inverlussa Marine Services	26.5 x 12 m	
806	Cancelled	RoPax Ferry	N/A	Orkney Islands Council	N/A	Cancelled order, first steel cut October 2019
90007	Hunter's Quay Linkspan	RoRo Ferry Linkspan	N/A	Western Ferries		Not a Ship
NA	MRV Scotia replacement	Research vessel	N/A	Marine Directorate	85 x 19m	Directly awarded contract
NA	MPV Minna replacement	Fishery Patrol Vessel	N/A	Marine Directorate	85 x 15m	Directly awarded contract
NA	Phase Two of the Small Vessel Replacement Programme	RO-RO Ferry	N/A	Caledonian Maritime Assets	N/A	Directly awarded contract
NA	Phase Two of the Small Vessel Replacement Programme	RO-RO Ferry	N/A	Caledonian Maritime Assets	N/A	Directly awarded contract

=== Ferguson Shipbuilders Ltd (1991–2014) ===
Reference
Yard No.	Name	Type	Launch	Ordered By	Length x Breadth	Notes
601	MV Loch Dunvegan	Double Ended RoPax Ferry	15 March 1991	CalMac Ferries	54.2 x 13.4m	
602	MV Loch Fyne	Double Ended RoPax Ferry	12 June 1991	CalMac Ferries	54.2 x 13.4m	
603	MV Star Pegasus	Offshore Supply vessel	22 January 1992	Star Offshore Services	68.83 x 17.5m	
604	NLV Pharos	Lighthouse Tender	11 December 1992	Northern Lighthouse Board	78.2 x 14.1m	
605	MV Leirna	Double Ended RoPax Ferry	27 August 1992	Shetland Islands Council Ferries	32.45 x 10.7m	
606	Red Falcon	Double Ended RoPax Ferry	18 August 1993	Red Funnel	83.6 / 93.2 x 17.5m	Lengthened by 9.6m in 2004 at Remontowa, Gdansk
607	Red Osprey	Double Ended RoPax Ferry	28 April 1994	Red Funnel	83.6 / 93.2 x 17.5m	Lengthened by 9.6m in 2003 at Remontowa, Gdansk
608	MV Isle of Lewis	RoPax Ferry	18 April 1995	CalMac Ferries	101.25 x 18m	
609	MV Tystie	Tug	3 August 1995	Shetland Towage Ltd	38.37 x 13.92m	
610	MV Dunter	Tug	25 October 1995	Shetland Towage Ltd	38.37 x 13.92m	
611	MV Red Eagle	Double Ended RoPax Ferry	23 November 1995	Red Funnel	83.6 / 93.2 x 17.5m	Lengthened by 9.6m in 2005 at Remontowa, Gdansk
612	MV Stirling Clyde	Offshore Supply vessel	17 May 1996	Stirling Offshore	83 x 19.19m	
703	MV UKD Bluefin	Dredger	22 January 1997	Associated British Ports	98 x 18.2m	
704	RV Scotia	Research Vessel	4 July 1997	Marine Scotland	68.6 x 15m	Named on 21 May 1998 by Queen Elizabeth II
705	MV Stirling Tay	Offshore Supply vessel	16 March 1998	Stirling Offshore	82.88 x 19.29m	
706	MV Stirling Spey	Offshore Supply vessel	11 September 1998	Stirling Offshore	82.88 x 19.29m	
707	MV Stirling Iona	Offshore Supply tug	28 September 1999	Stirling Shipping	73.8 x 16.3m	
708	MV Hebrides	RoPax Ferry	2 August 2000	CalMac Ferries	99 x 16m	Launched by Queen Elizabeth II
709	NLV Pole Star	Lighthouse tender	18 April 2000	Northern Lighthouse Board	51.52 x 12.1m	
710	MV Sound of Scarba	Double Ended RoPax Ferry	12 March 2001	Western Ferries	50 x 15m	
711	MV Stirling Jura	Offshore Supply tug	18 October 2001	Stirling Shipping	73.8 x 16.3m	
712	RV Cefas Endeavour	Research Vessel	14 August 2002	Centre for Environment, Fisheries and Aquaculture Science	72.92 x 16.11m	
713	Cancelled	RoPax Ferry	N/A	NorthLink Ferries	112 x 18m	Ferguson's withdrew order in December 2000, 2 months after the order was announced. Became MV Hamnavoe built in Aker Finnyards, Finland.
714	FPV Minna	Fishery Patrol	3 February 2003	Scottish Fisheries Protection Agency	47.7 x 10m	
715	MV Sound of Shuna	Double Ended RoPax Ferry	14 August 2003	Western Ferries	50 x 15m	
716	MV Spirit of the Tay	Passenger Excursion	Shipped 2003	Loch Tay Steam Packet Co	35 x ?m	Meant to be for Loch Tay excursions but due to disputes after shipping abandoned by Loch Tay.
717	CF Plym II	Double Ended RoPax chain ferry	3 August 2004	Tamar Bridge and Torpoint Ferry Joint Company	73 x 20.35m	
718	CF Tamar II	Double Ended RoPax chain ferry	31 August 2004	Tamar Bridge and Torpoint Ferry Joint Company	73 x 20.35m	
719	CF Lynher II	Double Ended RoPax chain ferry	7 June 2005	Tamar Bridge and Torpoint Ferry Joint Company	73 x 20.35m	
720	FPV Jura	Fishery Patrol	28 April 2005	Scottish Fisheries Protection Agency	84 x 13.1m	
721	MV Loch Shira	Double Ended RoPax Ferry	8 December 2006	Caledonian Maritime Assets	54.27 x 13.9m	
722	MV Arenig Fawr	Suction Dredger	2007	Airbus UK	18.5 x 5m	
725	MV Hallaig	Double Ended Diesel electric hybrid RoPax Ferry	17 December 2012	Caledonian Maritime Assets	43.5 x 12.2m	World's first diesel electric hybrid ferry
726	MV Lochinvar	Double Ended Diesel electric hybrid RoPax Ferry	23 May 2013	Caledonian Maritime Assets	43.5 x 12.2m	

=== Appledore Ferguson Shipbuilders Ltd (1986–1989) ===
Reference
Yard No.	Name	Type	Launch	Ordered By	Length x Breadth	Notes
572	MV Isle of Mull	RoPax Ferry	8 December 1987	CalMac Ferries	84.6 / 90.03 x 15.8m	Lengthened by 5.4m in 1988 by Tees Dockyard, Middlesbrough.
573	MV Lord of the Isles	RoPax Ferry	7 March 1989	CalMac Ferries	84.6 x 15.8m	

=== Ferguson-Ailsa Ltd (1983–1986) ===
Reference
Yard No.	Name	Type	Launch	Ordered By	Length x Breadth	Yard	Notes
491	MV Isle of Arran	RoPax Ferry	2 December 1983	CalMac Ferries	84.9 x 16.2m	Port Glasgow	
492	MV Mwokozi	Firefighting Tug	18 May 1984	Kenya Ports Authority	45.65 x 12.02m	Port Glasgow	
558	MV Star Vega	Offshore Supply	1 November 1982	Star Offshore Services Marine Ltd	68.5 x 16.2m	Troon	
559	MT Tarihiko	LPG Tanker	29 March 1983	Liquigas Ltd	81.1 x 13.9m	Troon	
560	MV Simba II	Firefighting Tug	21 October 1983	Kenya Ports Authority	36 x 10.29m	Troon	
561	MV Nguvu II	Firefighting Tug	31 January 1984	Kenya Ports Authority	36 x 10.29m	Troon	
562	MV Chui	Firefighting Tug	5 April 1984	Kenya Ports Authority	36 x 10.29m	Troon	
563	MV Duma	Firefighting Tug	28 June 1984	Kenya Ports Authority	36 x 10.29m	Troon	
564	MV Faru	Firefighting Tug	5 October 1984	Kenya Ports Authority	36 x 10.29m	Port Glasgow	
565	MV M.V.A.	Hopper Barge	11 February 1985	Stephenson Clarke Shipping Ltd	55.5 x 12.3m	Port Glasgow	
566	MV Fivla	Ferry	12 February 1985	Shetland Islands Council Ferries	30 x 9.6m	Troon	
567	MV Fort Resolution	Offshore Supply	17 October 1985	John Townsend Marine Ltd	65.36 x 13.06m	Port Glasgow	Converted into an Antarctic research vessel in 1988.
568	MV Fort Reliance	Firefighting Offshore Supply	28 March 1986	John Townsend Marine Ltd	65.36 x 13.09m	Port Glasgow	Completed by Ferguson Shipbuilders Ltd, being delivered in 1989. Converted into an ocean research vessel in 1989.
569	MV Seaforth Earl	Offshore Supply	3 October 1985	Seaforth Maritime Ltd	53.88 x 12.22m	Troon	
570	MV Seaforth Baronet	Offshore Supply	7 March 1986	Seaforth Maritime Ltd	53.88 x 12.22m	Troon	
571	RV Corystes	Research vessel	11 August 1986	Department of Agriculture, Fisheries & Food	53.2 x 13.06m	Troon	

=== Ferguson Brothers (Port Glasgow) Ltd (1912–1983) ===
Reference
Yard No.	Name	Type	Launch	Ordered By	Length x Breadth	Notes
460	MV Gilbert J Fowler	Sludge Carrier	23 September 1971	Manchester Corporation	90.96 x 14.18m	
461	DERV Scotia	Diesel Electric Research Vessel	25 March 1971	Secretary of State for Scotland	68.2 x 13.52m	
462	NPD Brasilia	No Propulsion Dredger	7 December 1971	Portobras	68.88 x 11.89m	
463	MV Consortium I	Sludge Carrier	29 February 1972	Manchester Corporation	90.96 x 14.2m	
464	MV St Benedict	Fishing Trawler	30 August 1972	Thomas Hamling, Hull	65.44 x 12.65m	Converted into a Fishing Research vessel in 1987.
465	MV Cambrae	Suction Hopper Dredger	18 January 1973	Civil & Marine Ltd, London	93.0 x 16.6m	
466	MV Goth	Fishing Trawler	28 June 1973	British United Trawlers Finance, Grimsby	59.75 x 12.53m	
467	MV Roman	Fishing Trawler	11 December 1973	British United Trawlers Finance, Grimsby	59.75 x 12.53m	
468	MV Sand Weaver	Suction Hopper Dredger	22 August 1974	South Coast Shipping Company, Southampton	91.5 x 16.7m	
469	MV Seaforth Jarl	Offshore Supply	28 March 1975	Seaforth Maritime Ltd, Aberdeen	67.37 x 14.0m	Sank off Newfoundland due to shift of cargo of anchor chains in adverse weather on 18 December 1983.
470	MV Seaforth Highlander	Offshore Supply	9 October 1975	Seaforth Maritime Ltd, Aberdeen	67.37 x 14.0m	
471	MV Gardyloo	Sludge Carrier	4 February 1976	Lothian Regional Council	85.88 x 14.23m	
472	NPD M.S.C. Ince	No Propulsion Dredger	28 June 1976	Manchester Ship Canal Company	39.76 x 11.0m	
473	MV Thames	Sludge Carrier	24 September 1976	Thames Water Authority	87.41 x 14.61m	Converted to an oil tanker in 1999. Scrapped in Aliaga in 2010.
474	MV Clarknes	Bulk Carrier	5 September 1977	Jebsens (UK) Ltd	87.03 x 13.75m	
475	MV Clydenes	Bulk Carrier	30 September 1977	Jebsens (UK) Ltd / Scandinavian Leasing Ltd	87.03 x 13.75m	Subcontracted to Scotts Shipbuilding Company, Greenock. Next two vessels in the order cancelled, were meant to be 476 & 477.
476	SS Lady Chilel Jawara	Ferry	29 March 1978	Gambia Government, Ports Authority	45.78 x 9.21m	Ran aground then sank in River Gambia on 7 December 1984
477	NPB M.S.C. No. 51	No Propulsion Barge	24 January 1978	Manchester Ship Canal Company	39.63 x 9.12m	
478	NPB M.S.C. No. 52	No Propulsion Barge	22 March 1978	Manchester Ship Canal Company	39.63 x 9.12m	
479	NPB M.S.C. No. 53	No Propulsion Barge	26 May 1978	Manchester Ship Canal Company	39.63 x 9.12m	
480	MV Mlawa	Bulk Carrier	2 February 1979	Polish Steamship Co, Stettin	87.99 x 14.6m	
481	MV Zgorzelec	Bulk Carrier	21 September 1979	Polish Steamship Co, Stettin	87.99 x 14.6m	
482	MV Auricula	Sonar Trials Vessel	11 November 1979	Ministry of Defence, Navy	?	
483	MV Sulisker	Fishery Patrol	27 June 1980	Ministry of Agriculture, Fisheries & Food, Scotland	?	
484	MV Donald Redford	Grab Hopper Dredger	26 November 1980	Manchester Ship Canal Co. Ltd	54 x ?m	Lengthened and converted to suction dredging in 1990.
485	MT Traquair	Gas Tanker	21 August 1981	Anchor Line Ltd	113.69 x 18.29m	Her aft part was built at Ailsa Shipbuilders, Troon, yard 557. Both were launched on the same day, being completed at Ferguson's.
486	MV Flying Phantom	Firefighting Tug	2 July 1981	Clyde Shipping Company Ltd	37.95 x 9.68m	On 19 December 2007, she was girted by bulk carrier MV Red Jasmine and subsequently capsized and sunk on the River Clyde.
487	MV Vigilant	Fishery Patrol	26 March 1982	Department of Agriculture & Fisheries, Scotland	71.4 x 11.71m	
488	MV Star Capella	Offshore Supply	23 September 1982	Star Offshore Services Marine Ltd	61.5 x 15.51m	
489	MV Tirrick	Tug	1 February 1983	Shetland Towage Ltd	37.44 x 11.82m	
490	MV Shalder	Tug	30 March 1983	Shetland Towage Ltd	37.44 x 11.82m	

== See also ==
Ferry fiasco - for the Scottish political controversy around the construction of the Glen Sannox and Glen Rosa.
