= Flying Phantom Ship =

- Poster
- Directed by: Hiroshi Ikeda
- Screenplay by: Masaki Tsuji; Hiroshi Ikeda
- Story by: Shotaro Ishinomori
- Produced by: Hiroshi Okawa
- Music by: Kosuke Onozaki
- Production company: Toei Doga
- Distributed by: Toei Company
- Release date: July 20, 1969
- Running time: 60 minutes
- Country: Japan
- Language: Japanese

See also Flying Phantom.

Flying Phantom Ship (空飛ぶゆうれい船, Soratobu Yūreisen) is a 1969 anime feature film directed by Hiroshi Ikeda and produced by Toei Animation. It was one of the first anime films to be dubbed into Russian and shown in Soviet cinema theaters. The key animation of the film and the design work on the giant robot was done by the then-largely-unknown Hayao Miyazaki.

In 2022, Discotek Media released the film on Blu-ray with an English dub.

== Plot ==
Hayato's home city is under attack from a gigantic robot. His parents are lying dead in the rubble and the only remaining friend is his dog. His only thought now is revenge against the owner of the Phantom Ship (from where the robot said he was sent).

He ends up in the house of Kuroshio, the leader of the fight against the Phantom Ship and the most important person in the city. By complete accident, Hayato finds his way to an underground passageway where he realizes that the true nature of events does not mesh with what Kuroshio has told him.

His life is now in great danger, and only he can stop the plans of the evildoers.

== Cast ==
Character	Japanese	English
Hayato Arashiyama	Masako Nozawa	Mona Marshall
Technician Arashiyama	Akira Nagoya	Frank Todaro
Mr. Kuroshio	Akio Tanaka	Lucas Schuneman
Mrs. Kuroshio	Kyoko Satomi	Anne Yatco
Minister of Defense Haniwa	Kōsei Tomita	Rick Zieff
Ruriko	Yukiko Okada	Julia Gu
Captain Phantom	Gorō Naya	Patrick Seitz
