= MV Glen Rosa =

Ferry under construction

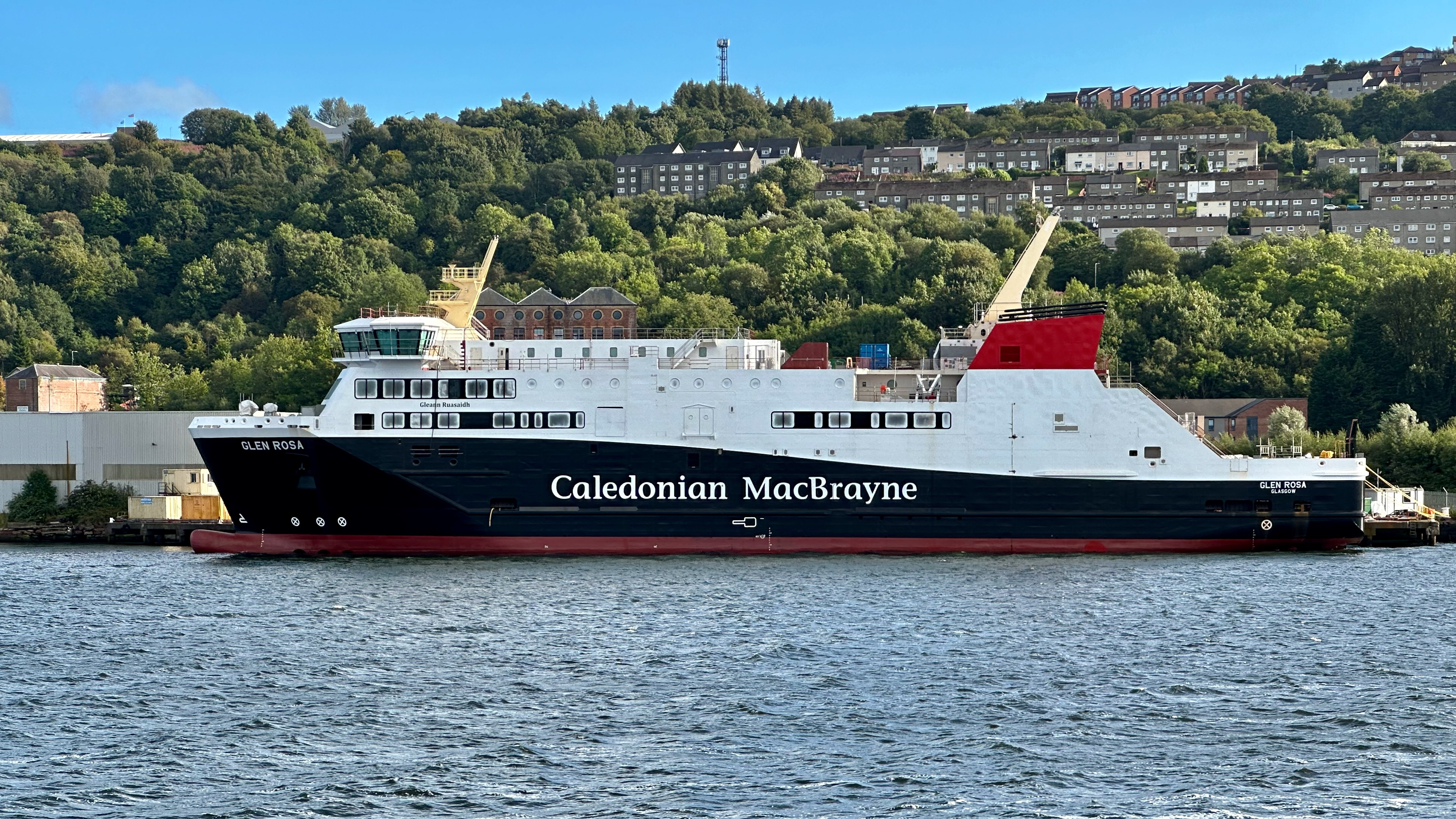
- MV Glen Rosa fitting out at Newark Quay, August 2024

History
- Name: Glen Rosa
- Namesake: Glen Rosa on the Isle of Arran
- Owner: Caledonian Maritime Assets
- Operator: Caledonian MacBrayne
- Port of registry: Glasgow
- Route: Troon - Brodick
- Ordered: 16 October 2015
- Builder: Ferguson Marine, Port Glasgow, Scotland
- Cost: £97 million original contract for two ferries; £380 million as of June 2024, and £45 million loan written off.
- Yard number: 802
- Laid down: 16 June 2016
- Launched: 9 April 2024
- Christened: by Beth Atkinson
- Completed: Q1 2027 (expected)
- Identification: IMO number: 9794525
- Status: Under construction

General characteristics
- Tonnage: 1,273 DWT
- Length: 102.4 m (335 ft 11 in)
- Beam: 17 m (55 ft 9 in)
- Draught: 3.4 m (11 ft 2 in)
- Installed power: 2 × Wärtsilä 34DF diesels.
- Propulsion: 2 x Controllable pitch propellers; 3 bow thrusters
- Speed: 14.5 kn (26.85 km/h)
- Capacity: 1,000 passengers, 127 cars or 16 HGVs (planned); 852 passengers (actual)

MV Glen Rosa (Scottish Gaelic: Gleann Ruasaidh) is a car and passenger ferry, the second of two major vessels constructed at Ferguson Marine in Port Glasgow for the Scottish Government asset company Caledonian Maritime Assets (CMAL) to lease to its ferry operator Caledonian MacBrayne. Originally planned for Uig based services, she will serve Arran. Like her sister ship, Glen Sannox, she is to be a dual-fuel ferry, capable of operating on either marine gas oil, or LNG which offers a marked reduction in sulphur, nitrous oxide and carbon emissions. The ship's name was chosen from a shortlist by public ballot on 30 August 2023.

The sister ship, Glen Sannox, had been substantially incomplete when launched on 21 November 2017 and moved to the shipyard's Newark Quay. At that point, the slipway became available for the two sections of Hull 802 (Glen Rosa) to be brought together. There has been a sequence delays; as of December 2025, she was expected to be delivered no earlier than February 2027.

== Construction history ==
Glen Rosa will be the second of two Scottish ferries capable of operating on either marine diesel oil or liquefied natural gas (LNG), aiming at benefits of a marked reduction in carbon dioxide, sulphur and nitrous oxide emissions. The first steel for both ships was cut on 7 April 2016. The first ship, Glen Sannox, was launched on 21 November 2017 by then First Minister Nicola Sturgeon.

=== Bidding process ===
Of the six shipyards biding for fixed price contracts to design and build the two ships, Ferguson Marine (FMEL), owned by Jim McColl, was the only Scottish bidder. During negotiations, the government named FMEL as preferred tenderer, though it had just told CMAL that it could not provide the contractually required bank-backed guarantee. FMEL had already discussed this with Scottish Government ministers, who now decided the government would take on the risks, and the contracts were awarded on 16 October 2015.

=== Construction delays ===
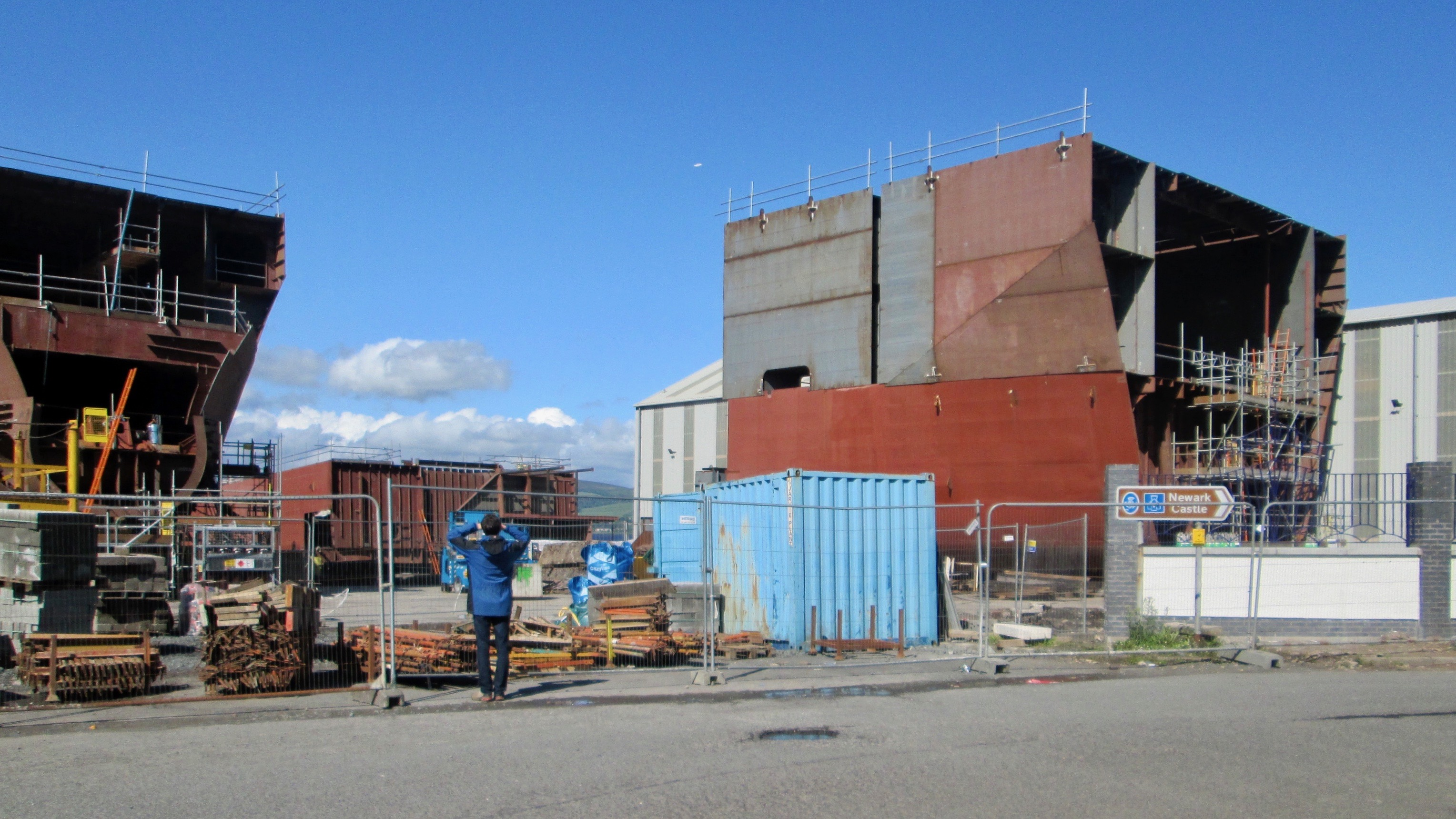
Glen Sannox on slipway, two sections of Hull 802 (Glen Rosa) to the right, as of June 2017

FMEL agreed a contract to design, construct, and deliver both vessels by 26 July 2018, but then began construction before providing drawings and plans of its design for approval as required by the contract, and there were increasing delays when work had to be redone. In July 2017, FMEL denied responsibly for these problems and claimed additional costs, CMAL dismissed the claims. The dispute escalated with further delays. FMEL went into administration, and in December 2019 the shipyard was nationalised as Ferguson Marine (Port Glasgow) Ltd., but increasing costs and further lengthy delays became a continuing political scandal, the "ferry fiasco".

Glen Rosa was contracted to be launched in 2018, and to enter service the following year. After FMEL went into administration and the yard was nationalised, it was estimated in December 2019 that the second ferry would be delivered to CMAL in summer 2022. There were delays due to the pandemic and shortages of skilled labour, and in June 2021 delivery was rescheduled for April 2023 to July 2023.

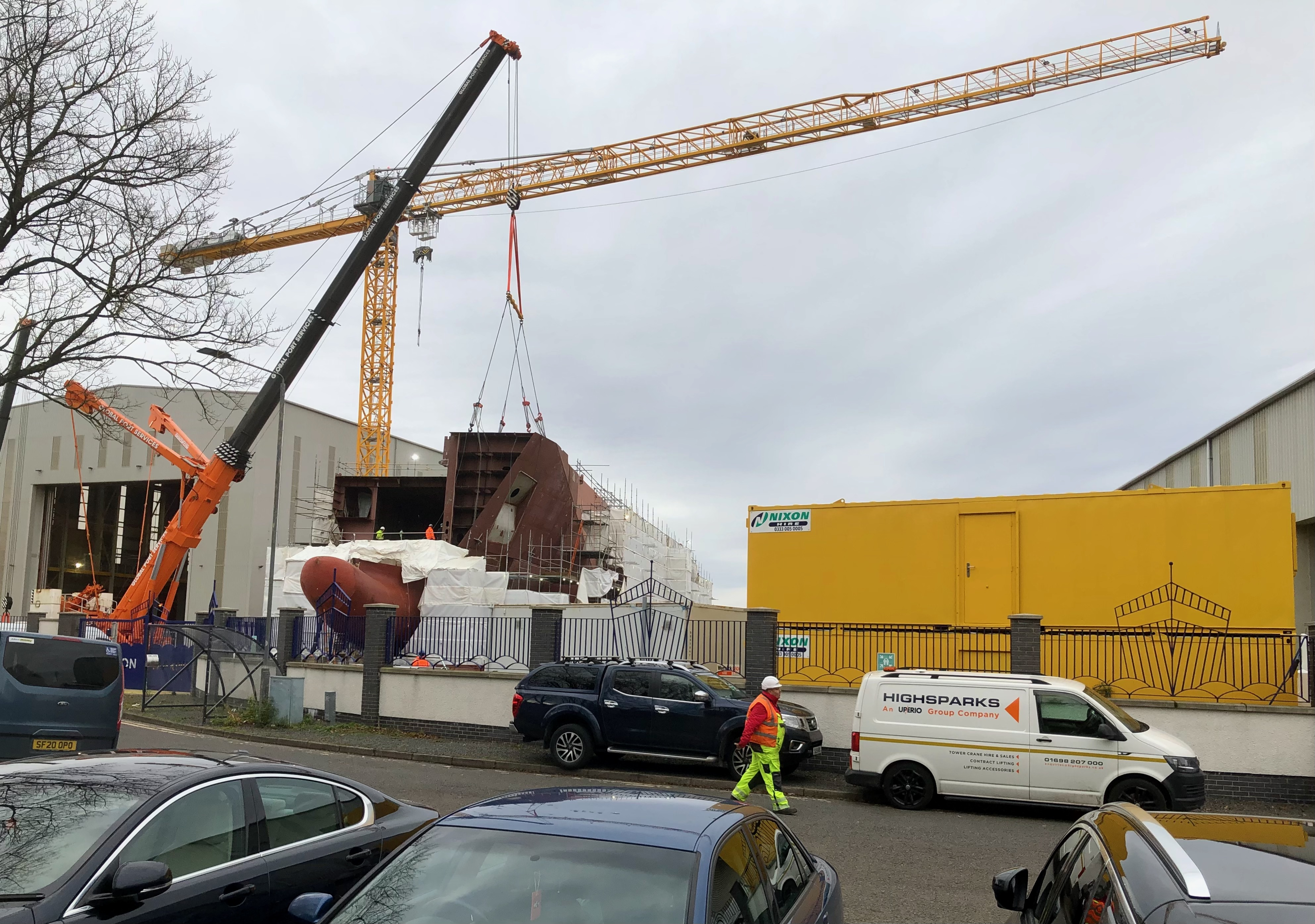
December 2021, Hull 802 on slipway with bulbous bow in place, hull section being added

At the start of September 2021, installation of the bulbous bow, as well as stern sections, was reported as marking significant progress. Further delays in early 2022 saw the delivery date slip to October–December 2023. The ship's delivery date was delayed again in September 2022 to the first quarter of 2024.

=== Naming ===
A public poll was run in August 2023 to choose a name for the vessel, which had previously been referred to as "Hull 802", from a shortlist of Claymore, Glen Cloy and Glen Rosa. Glen Rosa was announced as the name on 31 August 2023, having been selected by 52% out of a total vote of nearly 5,000 entries.

=== Delays to launch ===
As of August 2023, the expected launch date was March 2024, with the vessel due to enter service by the end of 2024. By the end of September 2023, however, Ferguson chief executive David Tydeman told the Scottish Government’s Net Zero, Energy and Transport Committee that MV Glen Rosa had been further delayed and that its completion date had been pushed back from the end of 2024 to the end of May 2025.

On 10 November 2023, it was announced that the launch date for Glen Rosa had been set as 12 March 2024, but this was later pushed back to 9 April following additional delays to Glen Sannox, which was fitted out at the shipyard's Newark Quay, and had begun sea trials on 13 February.

=== Ceremonial ship launch, 5 April 2024 ===
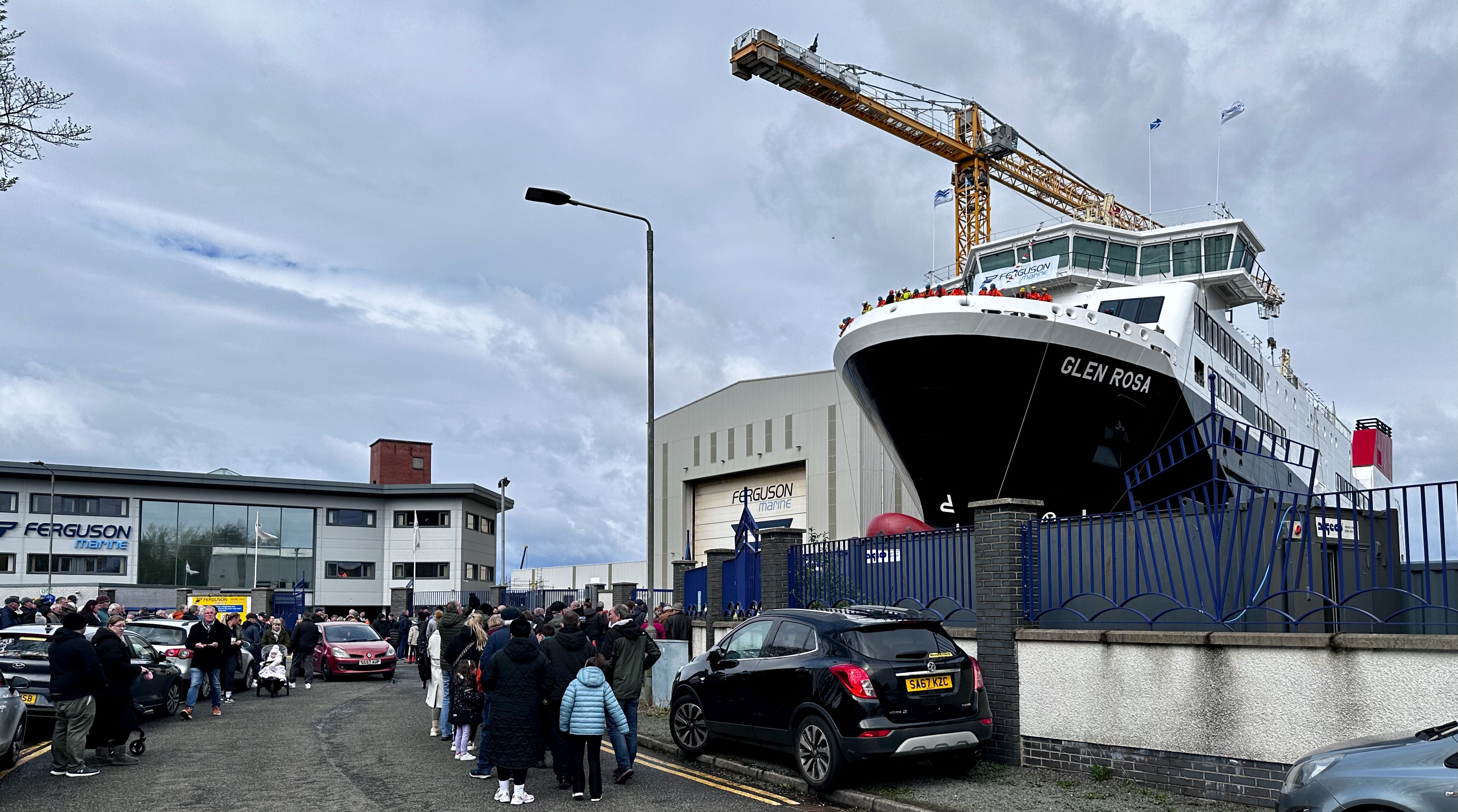
Public waiting to attend the launch

As the ceremonial ship launching neared, Ferguson Marine lacked new orders, and was under threat of closure. Clyde-built ships had dominated international trade a century earlier, now BAE Systems is the only other Clyde shipbuilder. Like many internationally, BAE no longer risk traditional dynamic slipway launches; they use a semi-submersible heavy-lift vessel to launch Type 26 frigates gently in deep water, others build ships in dry docks. This was to be the 363rd ship built at the site since Ferguson Brothers established the shipyard in 1903, and the heaviest. They had a week of the necessary high tide, which would not occur again until December.

Responding to Inverclyde community interest, the public were invited to attend the launch, with access to the yard "on a first come, first served basis". Crowds filled the allocated areas on 9 April 2024, while hundreds more watched from the adjacent Coronation Park (infilled from the original harbours), Newark Castle grounds and the park to its east (on the former site of Lamont's Castle Yard).

Launch down slipway

Ferguson Marine interim CEO John Petticrew welcomed the launch as a significant milestone, Scottish Government cabinet secretary Màiri McAllan gave a short speech, local minister Rev. William Boyle blessed the vessel, then after a short delay due to gusting wind, the Glen Rosa was named and launched by Beth Atkinson, a qualified welder who had completed her apprenticeship at the yard the year prior. MSP Stuart McMillan played the bagpipes as the ship went down the slipway. Tugs then moved the vessel to the shipyard's Newark Quay (which had recently been vacated when Glen Sannox began its sea trials, then was moved to the nearby Inchgreen Quay in Greenock).

=== Completion ===
As of November 2024, the expected delivery date was September 2025. In May 2025, a further delay to the second quarter of 2026 was announced. In December 2025, the delay was further extended to the fourth quarter of 2026 due to the discovery of corrosion. In October 2026, the Scottish Government announced that, while construction was still scheduled to be completed by the end of the year, commissioning of the vessel had been pushed back to February 2027 to allow remedial works on the propellers and LNG systems to be carried out before she enters service.

Glen Rosa began her first sea trial in November 2026.

== Service ==
Glen Rosa was originally ordered to serve on the "Uig Triangle" routes, linking Tarbert on Harris and Lochmaddy on North Uist with Uig on Skye. However in October 2022, CMAL ordered two new ferries for this route, named MV Claymore and MV Lochmor, leading to uncertainty about where Glen Rosa would be deployed. In August 2023, CMAL confirmed that she would serve Arran, partnering Glen Sannox, with both dual-fuel vessels allocated to the Ardrossan to Brodick route. Under this plan the two new Arran ferries would initially operate between Troon and Brodick for the first two or three years of their careers, due to the planned upgrade works for Ardrossan harbour.

On 25 September 2026, CalMac published a report indicating a change to this plan in order to maintain a service from Ardrossan until upgrade works are complete. This will see Glen Rosa operating from Troon whilst MV Hebrides would operate from Ardrossan. Under these plans, Glen Sannox will now replace MV Isle of Lewis on the Barra service once Glen Rosa enters service.
