= Clyde Shipping Company =

Shipping company

- House flag
- Industry: Shipping
- Founded: 1815
- Defunct: 1974
- Successor: Clyde Marine Group
- Headquarters: Glasgow, Scotland
- Area served: United Kingdom

The Clyde Shipping Company was one of the earliest shipping companies in the United Kingdom to provide steamship services.

== History ==
House flag used by Clyde Shipping Company before 1924, some sources do not mention the red frame.

The Clyde Shipping Company or C. S. Co. was established in 1815 to provide steamship services out of Glasgow. Although its very early history is unclear, it was almost certainly the oldest steamship company in existence when it was put up for sale – along with its four tug steamers, three luggage steamers and eight lighters – in February 1856.

1856 – 1893

The C. S. Co. seemed an ideal investment to Archibald Glen Kidston (great-grandfather of 'Bentley Boy' Glen Kidston), who was looking for a Glasgow-based business to occupy his three sons, in particular his youngest, George Jardine, who was 21 years old at the time. Archibald Glen's own business, A. G. Kidston & Co., was thriving and as it owned sailing clippers as well as dealing in iron and steel, steam tugs were a natural evolution.

While the partners in the newly purchased C. S. Co. were the three Kidston brothers, their cousin, and two others unrelated to the Kidston family, only George Jardine Kidston took an active role in running the company – which he did for the next 53 years.

George Kidston, who had nine children when he became a widower at the age of just 46, had a great love of outdoor sports, especially fox-hunting. Known to be a shy man, he was a kind and indulgent father – said only to have caned his sons when they chose to saw the legs off the drawing-room chairs.

Although reportedly remote from the staff of the C. S. Co., George Kidston had a reputation for discretion, wisdom, and a willingness to invest in potentially risky new ventures, usually with great success. The year 1856 saw the launch of the company's first regular coastal service to Cork and Waterford and to Galway Bay, the Shannon estuary and Limerick. A service to Plymouth was later extended to Southampton, Newhaven and London. From 1888, the deep-sea tramping trade saw the company heavily involved in the guano, nitrate and copper trade in the Pacific islands.

George Jardine remained as chairman when, in January 1893, the original partnership of the C. S. Co. was dissolved to form a limited liability company. By then, the seven river vessels and eight lighters of 1856 had expanded to a fleet of 15 coasters, two deep-sea ships and 25 tugs.

Meanwhile, James Cuthbert was appointed managing director of the new limited company, an energetic young man who had contributed much to the C. S. Co.'s rapid expansion since he joined the company as a 21-year-old, eight years before.

1893 – 1956

James Cuthbert remained as managing director until he died of a stroke in 1901. He was succeeded by his son, William Cuthbert, who held the role of managing director (and, from 1920, chairman) for the next 45 years. Whereas staff spoke warily of James Cuthbert's sense of humour, clearly unsure when he was joking and when he was not, his son William – a committed church elder – did much to create a congenial atmosphere around him, even through the difficult war years.

In common with other merchant shipping companies, the Clyde Shipping Company saw various forms of requisition and multiple tragedies during the two world wars. In total, 14 of C. S. Co.'s ships were sunk in WWI and three in WWII, with almost 200 lives lost as a result.

In 1917, two of the C. S. Co.'s vessels became 'Q' ships, crewed by the Royal Navy, while other vessels were occasionally requisitioned during WWI – but most of the fleet continued to operate within the company. The Second World War was very different. The entire fleet was requisitioned, many as rescue ships, although the management remained with the C. S. Co.

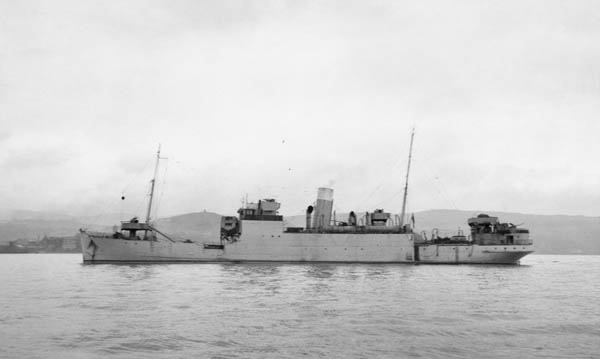
Company vessel SS Rathlin participating in the arctic convoys during the Second World War

Having steered the C. S. Co. through two world wars, William Cuthbert died in April 1946. The obvious man to replace him as chairman and Joint Managing Director was William Logan, a grandson of George Jardine Kidston, and a lively and 'unusual' man with no patience for bureaucracy. There was, it was said, never a dull moment in meetings, thanks to Logan's skills of mimicry and deliberate spoonerisms. But he was the ideal candidate in the difficult post-war period, his close personal interest in both technical details and the staff of the company proving a great asset at a time when the fleet was being decommissioned and a great deal of money spent on new diesel-engined ships built at Dundee.

The Second World War not only suspended the company's trade but fundamentally changed the trading future. For many reasons – from bomb damage and a scarcity of goods such as coal and butter, to the development of the road transport industry – the decade that followed held new and difficult challenges.

One such challenge led to the decision, in 1945, to accept that passenger trade was unlikely ever to be profitable again, and hence to run the fleet only for cargo services. The exception to this was the passenger service to Cork, always the most profitable, and that declined to the extent that it, too, was ended in 1952. The majority of the C. S. Co.'s passengers had always been pleasure-seekers, travelling purely for enjoyment. As the official history of the first 100 years of the Clyde Shipping Company published in 1956 pointed out, it was a sad business decision: "sentimental associations will be lacking which have meant much in past years".

At the time the official centenary history was published, the future of the company was uncertain: "Today, with nationalisation of transport the avowed aim of one political party and penal taxation the practice of both, it is perhaps more natural to speculate not upon how long the Company has existed but upon how much longer it will continue so to do."

In 1963 the company acquired the shipping company of Ross and Marshall. The company's Irish interests were sold to Mainport Holdings in 1974 and the rest of the company later forms part of Clyde Marine Group.
