= Flying Phantom =

Tugboat that sank in 2007

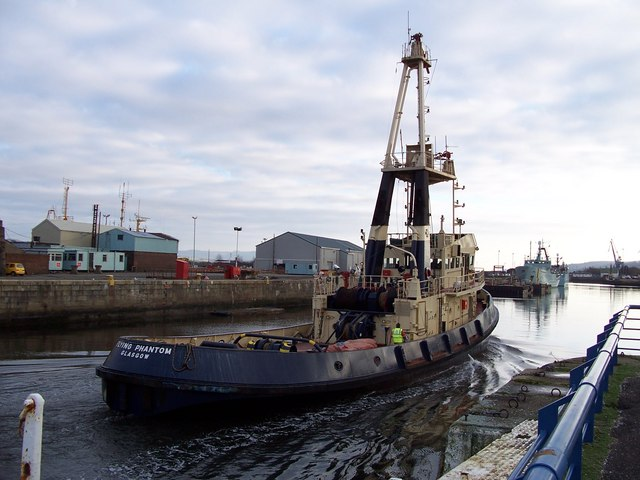
- Flying Phantom at James Watt Dock, December 2006

History

United Kingdom
- Name: Flying Phantom
- Owner: 1981-1994: Clyde Shipping Company Ltd, Glasgow; 1994-2000: Clyde Tugs Ltd, Glasgow; 2000-2000: Cory Towage Ltd, London; 2000-2001: Wijsmuller Marine Ltd, Middlesbrough; 2001-2007: Svitzer Marine Ltd, Middlesbrough
- Port of registry: Glasgow
- Builder: Ferguson Shipbuilders, Port Glasgow
- Yard number: 486
- Laid down: 3 December 1980
- Launched: 2 July 1981
- Completed: 11 November 1981
- Identification: IMO number: 8011770
- Fate: Sunk, 19 December 2007

General characteristics
- Type: Tug
- Tonnage: 347 GRT, later 287 GT
- Length: 37.95 m (124 ft 6 in)
- Beam: 9.69 m (31 ft 9 in)
- Height: 4.55 m (14 ft 11 in)
- Draught: 3.83 m (12 ft 7 in)
- Propulsion: 2 × Ruston 6RKCM 6-cylinder diesel engines, total 2,820 bhp (2,103 kW); Single screw; From May 1997, additional Aquamaster UL601 retractable azimuth thruster driven by 600 bhp (447 kW) Cummins KTA19M3 engine
- Speed: 13 knots (24 km/h; 15 mph)
- Crew: 4
- Notes: 50 tonnes bollard pull (40tbp until 1997)

Flying Phantom was a tug built in 1981 for the Clyde Shipping Company and based in Greenock in Scotland. As a consequence of business takeovers and mergers, by 2001 she was owned by Svitzer Marine Ltd of Middlesbrough, though still based on the Clyde.

She sank in the River Clyde at Clydebank on 19 December 2007, with the loss of Stephen Humphreys (captain), Robert Cameron (engineer) and Eric Blackley (deckhand) with only Brian Aitchison (mate) surviving. She was one of three tugs assisting the bulk carrier Red Jasmine. On the night of the accident, there was extremely poor visibility, due to heavy fog.

Following the incident the Marine Accident Investigation Branch carried out a full investigation on the accident, and their report was published in September 2008. The MAIB concluded that failings in the safety regime of the harbour authority Clydeport, as well as operational shortcomings by the tug operator, and lack of an accepted international industry standard for tug tow line emergency release systems all contributed to the capsize of Flying Phantom and the loss of the three crew-members. The vessel was salvaged in January 2008, allowing evidence to be gathered for the MAIB report, and was subsequently scrapped.

Earlier reports that criminal charges had been laid against Clydeport and Svitzer were confirmed on 22 April 2013. In October 2013, Svitzer pleaded guilty to breaching health and safety laws, and was fined £1.7 million. In September 2014 Clydeport was also fined.
