= Flying Phantom (catamaran) =

Development
- Designer: Martin Fischer
- Year: 2013
- Design: one design

Boat
- Crew: 2
- Trapeze: two on each side

Hull
- Type: catamaran
- Construction: Pre-preg carbon, Nomex sandwich
- Hull weight: 155 kg
- LOH: 5.52 m
- Beam: 3.00 m (9.84 ft)

Hull appendages
- Keel: two L-shaped daggerboards

Rig
- Rig type: bermuda rig
- Mast height: 9.6 m (31 ft)

Sails
- Mainsail area: 18 m2
- Jib/genoa area: 5.5 m2
- Spinnaker area: 24 m2 (gennaker)

The Flying Phantom is a one-design catamaran capable of planing above the surface of the water due to curved daggerboards acting as hydrofoils. It is built by Phantom International, and is the boat used in the Red Bull Foiling Generation race series.
