= Scottish ferry fiasco =

Ongoing political scandal in Scotland

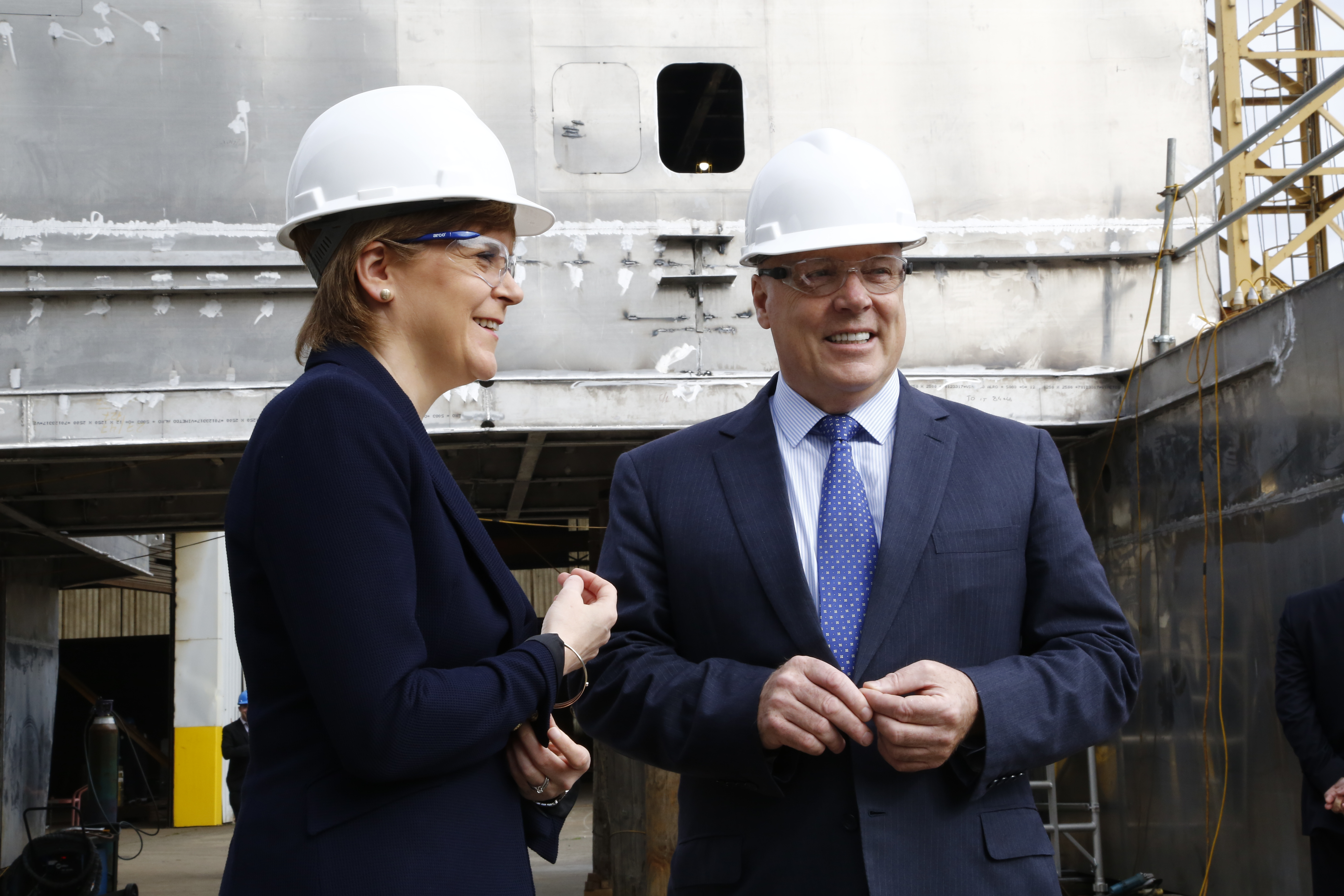
The then First Minister Nicola Sturgeon and Jim McColl at the Ferguson Marine shipyard on 31 August 2015

The Scottish ferry fiasco is the political scandal surrounding the construction of the ferries MV Glen Sannox and MV Glen Rosa in Scotland, which has been marred by delays and increasing costs. The ferries are being built by Ferguson Marine, for the state-owned ferry operator Caledonian MacBrayne under direction of Caledonian Maritime Assets (CMA), Transport Scotland, and the Scottish Government. Originally intended to come into service in 2018 and 2019 respectively, both ferries have been delayed by over five years, and costs have more than quadrupled to £460 million.

The contract required the ships to have dual fuel engines, to use both marine gas oil diesel fuel, and liquefied natural gas which was already in use for ferries in northern Europe, such as the Samsø ferry, to meet tightened emissions regulation. Ferguson Marine director Jim McColl later said the ferries were UK "prototypes", and that delays had been incurred in getting certification for Ferguson's design from Lloyd's Register and the Maritime and Coastguard Agency.

The main contractor, Ferguson Marine, was nationalised by the Scottish Government in December 2019 with debts of £70 million. It is now classified as an executive non-departmental public body of the Scottish Government.

Caledonian MacBrayne ("CalMac") operate mainly in the Clyde and Hebrides regions of the west coast of Scotland, and serve a local population of around 45,000 people. There are no other large scale ferry operators in the area. Many of its routes are considered "lifeline services" which run to 22 of the 'major' west-coast islands. On average its 34 vessels complete 466 crossings a day.

Delays and cancellations in recent years have been blamed by CalMac on ageing ferries, with the average age of their vessels being 24 years. Of the 10 largest ferries, four are over 30 years old, which is beyond their expected operational life; Isle of Arran is 40 years old. Research shows the replacement of ferries fell from one every 14 months from 1993 to 2007 (with 33,350 tonnes launched), to one every 36.1 months from 2007 to 2021 (with 16,188 tonnes launched).

== Procurement process ==
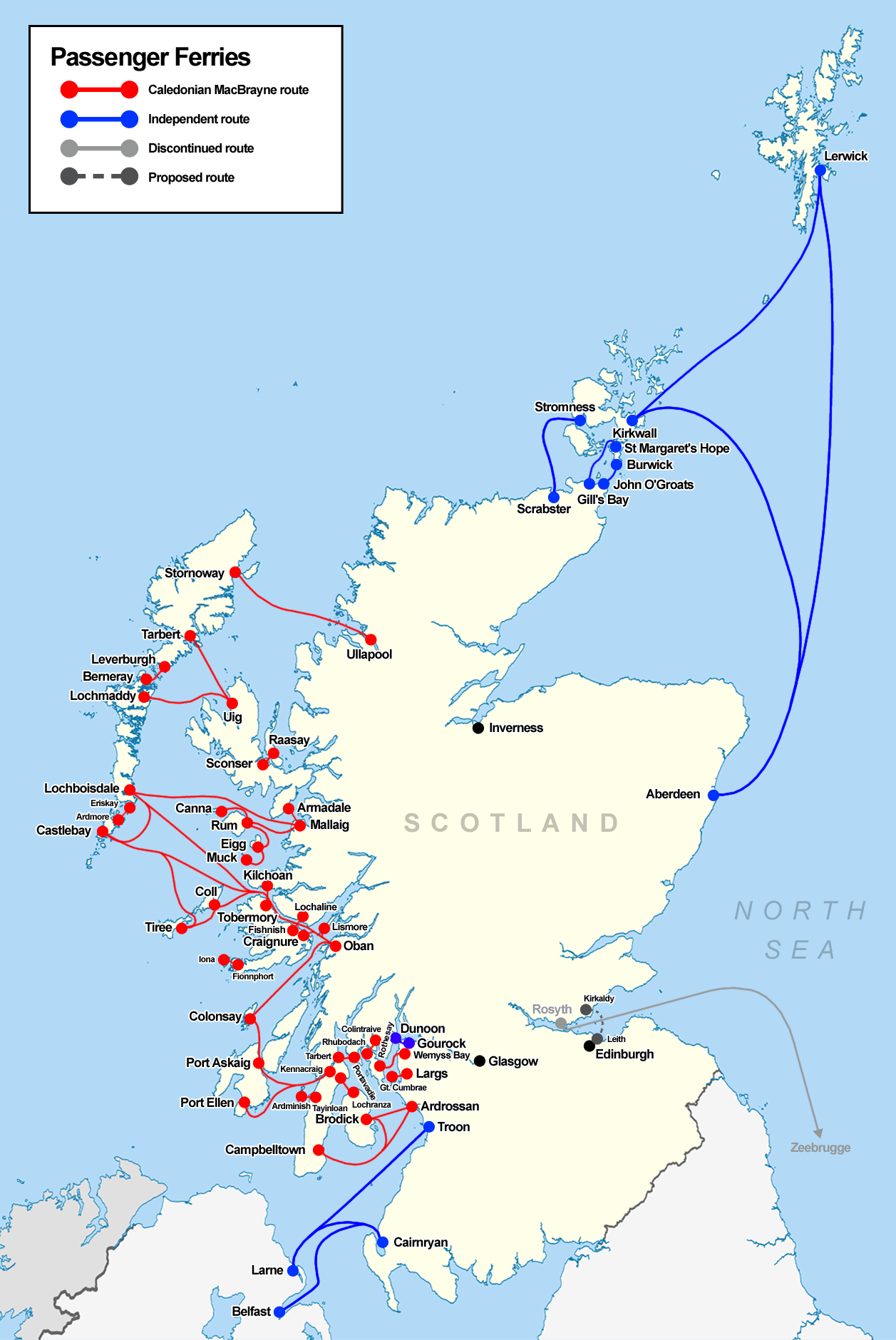
A map showing all the significant ferry routes in Scotland. Caledonian MacBrayne routes are shown in red.

The last shipyard on the lower River Clyde, Ferguson Shipbuilders, went into administration in 2014. In August of that year, then First Minister of Scotland Alex Salmond brokered a deal with industrialist Jim McColl who bought the business and assets, and formed Ferguson Marine Engineering Ltd. (FMEL) as a new subsidiary. A year later the business was awarded a £97 million contract to build two ferries: one to serve the Isle of Arran, replacing MV Isle of Arran, and the second to sail between Skye, North Uist and Harris. Inverclyde SNP MP Ronnie Cowan described this decision as "just reward" for the investment McColl had made in Ferguson Marine. Ferguson Marine was announced as the preferred bidder on 31 August 2015 to coincide with an announcement from the UK Government about a £500 million expansion of the Royal Navy's nuclear submarine base at nearby Faslane.

At the time there were concerns that Ferguson Marine had not built any ferries of that size in the recent past. A new management team had recently been installed, and they too had no experience of building a ferry of this size. The finances of Ferguson Marine were so tight that they told the Scottish Government they could not provide the financial guarantees that were stipulated in the contract. These guarantees would make the shipbuilder responsible for any cost overruns. Of the six shipyards that tendered to build the ferries, Ferguson Marine put forward the most expensive bid, at £37 million more than the cheapest.

As contract negotiations between Caledonian Maritime Assets Ltd ("CMAL"), a wholly owned public corporation of the Scottish Government which owns the ferries as well as 16 of the ports and harbours in the Clyde and Islands, and Ferguson Marine were concluding in September 2015, the chairman of CMAL, Erik Ostergard, criticised the process, ongoing costs and Ferguson Marine's lack of a track record in projects of this nature. Scottish Ministers wrote to Ostergard absolving his organisation of blame should the deal go bad. CMAL's preference was to restart the procurement process. On 9 October Transport Scotland informed CMAL that, after due consideration, Scottish ministers were aware of the risks but content to proceed to award the contract.

The contract was formally awarded to Ferguson Marine at the Scottish National Party Conference in Aberdeen on 16 October 2015. The announcement was made by Derek Mackay who was then the Minister for Transport and Islands.

=== Controversy ===
In September 2022, the BBC obtained documents indicating that Ferguson Marine received preferential treatment in the procurement process. CMAL held an in-person meeting with Ferguson, which was not extended to other bidders. Ferguson also uniquely received a 424-page document from a design consultant setting out CalMac's technical requirements, which was not extended to other bidders, who had to rely on a more limited 125-page specification. A key section of Ferguson's bid was largely copied from this longer document. Ferguson was also allowed to significantly change its design halfway through the tender by developing a variant mentioned but discounted in its original submission. This change allowed it to reduce its price by nearly £10 million.

== Design and build ==
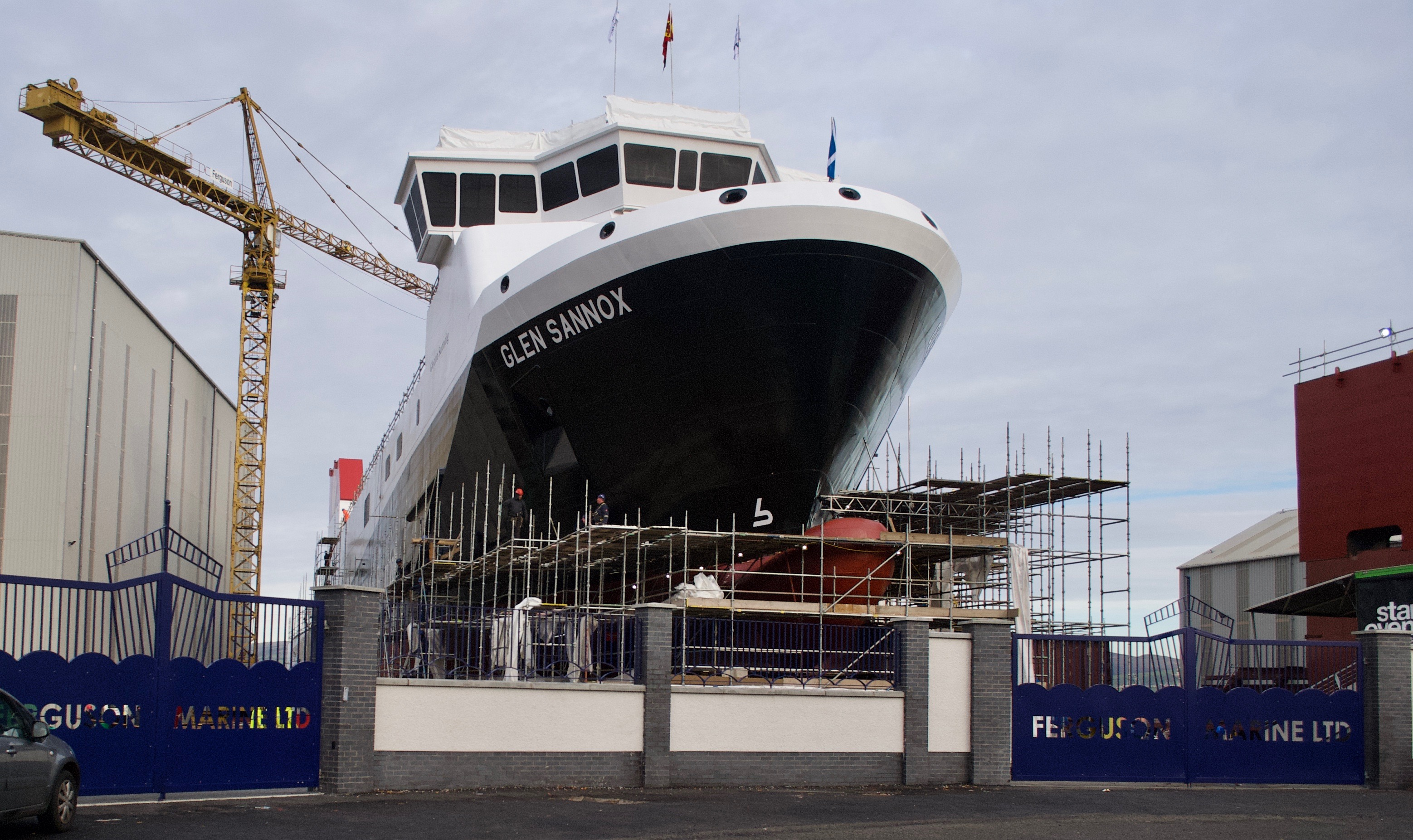
MV Glen Sannox under construction at Ferguson Marine, Glasgow

When designed, it was decided that the two ferries would use both marine diesel and liquified natural gas, which was a new concept for the region, and would allow the ferries to have lower emissions and allow operators flexibility over fuel sourcing and fuel costs. Another requirement was that the ferries would need larger bow thrusters and a stern thruster to make them more manoeuvrable in dock. Liquefied natural gas needs to be stored at −162 °C and the required tanks and bow thrusters meant each ferry being 200 tonnes heavier than an equivalent vessel.

Within two months of the contract being awarded, CMAL alerted the Project Steering Group (PSG) to problems at Ferguson Marine. The PSG was chaired by Transport Scotland and also included representatives from CMAL and CalMac and provided oversight of the project. CMAL reported that Ferguson Marine failed to provide a detailed plan for building the ferries, and failed to assign the correct workforce resources; quality issues were becoming apparent, and there was lack of space at the shipyard. CMAL could not intervene with the shipbuilder's handling of the project and could not prevent them from starting construction of the vessels before designs were finalised. During this time Transport Scotland only provided oral updates on the project to Scottish Ministers.

=== Passenger capacity ===
Early in 2024 it was revealed that the passenger capacity of each ferry, which was stipulated to be 1,000 passengers in the contract, would actually be only 852. Ferguson Marine stated that this would not be a breach of contract because the contract was being amended.

=== Initial delays ===
The contract for the ships stipulated that Ferguson Marine had to submit individual sets of drawings at least 30 days prior to work starting, as CMAL needed approval from Lloyd's Register. Ferguson Marine reported that the requirement for CMAL to sign off every drawing slowed progress down and it could take several months for the shipbuilder to process CMAL's comments on the individual drawings. The shipbuilder reported that it had to engage in out-of-sequence working to try to keep the project moving, so it prioritised constructing the vessels to meet the milestone dates. Despite not having an approved design, steel was cut on 15 December 2015 in line with the contractual date. CMAL's onsite team identified problems during construction and issued reports to Ferguson Marine's management outlining their concerns and recommendations. The shipbuilder considered some of the recommendations unnecessary and that they added to costs and delays. CMAL could not direct the builder to respond, and by the time they went into administration only 52 per cent of the issues had been resolved. From 2016 Ferguson Marine experienced cash flow problems which it blamed on problems with the contract. The Scottish Government approved a series of financial support payments and loans. Audit Scotland subsequently found that although this financial support allowed the shipbuilder to retain its workforce, it had little effect on the progress of construction.

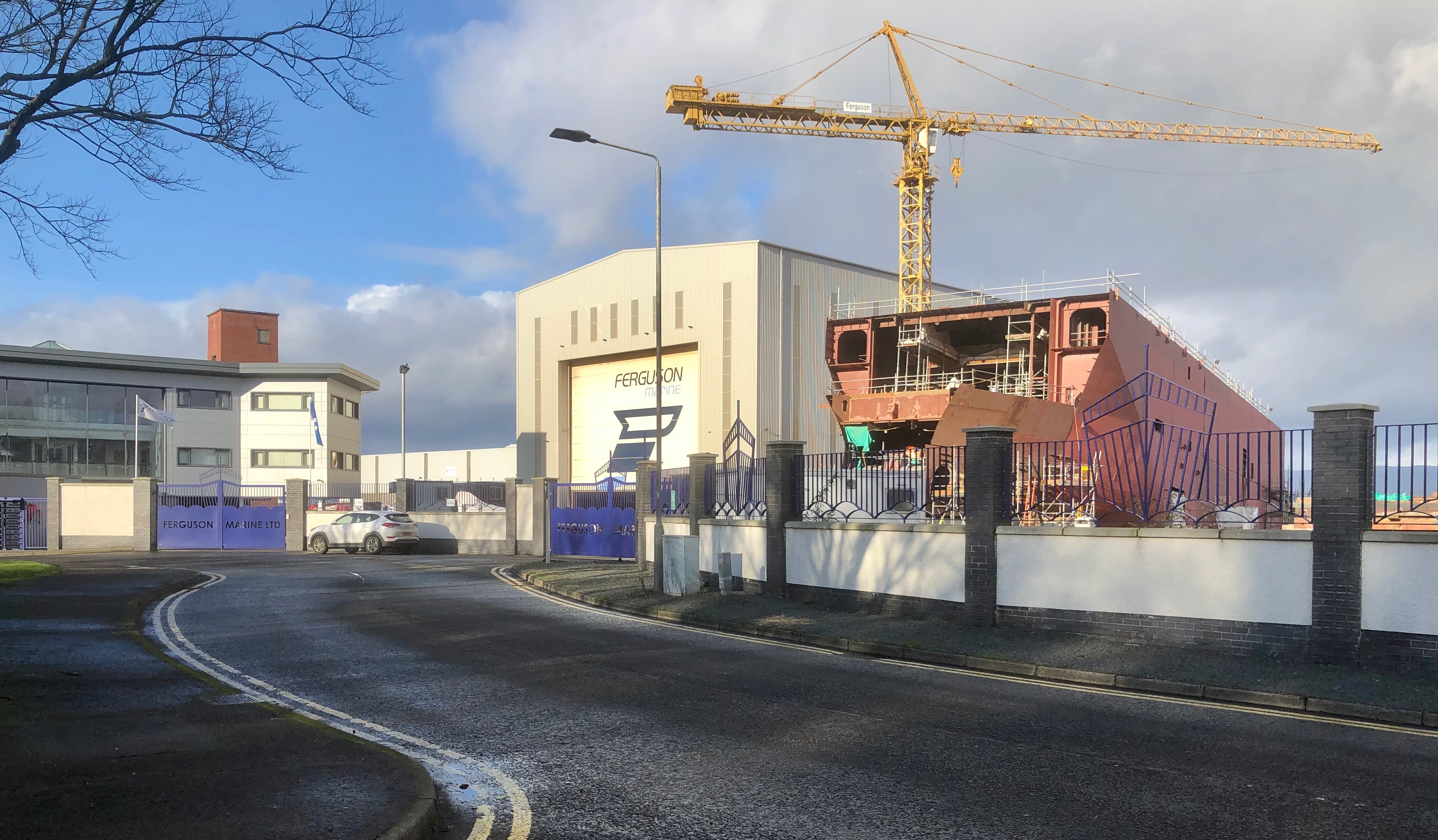
Hull 802 under construction at Ferguson Marine Glasgow

The delays got worse as the project progressed. By November 2017, when First Minister Nicola Sturgeon launched Glen Sannox, the ship (which was supposed to be in service by mid-2018) was 431 days behind schedule. At launch, windows had been painted on, the funnel was not operational and the bulbous bow, though present, was made from flat sheet steel and had been rejected by an inspector from Lloyd's Register as requiring to be renewed in its entirety. The BBC claimed that these items had been fitted so that the builder could claim one of 15 "milestone payments" (to culminate in the final payment of £97 million on delivery of the ferries) from the Scottish Government. As of October 2024 the ferry is not yet in service.

Ferguson Marine went into administration in August 2019. Shortly beforehand, CMAL had reported to the Project Steering Group that the vessels were showing signs of deterioration, that no more than six people were working on Glen Sannox, and no more than two people working on vessel 802 an any one time. The construction of both hulls continued to suffer repeated delays and mechanical issues after nationalisation. A turnaround director, Tim Hair, was appointed between August 2019 and July 2021: he brought improvements to the yard and created 100 jobs, but there was criticism of the £1.2 million paid in fees to secure his services.

COVID-19 further hampered construction, which was stopped for 11 weeks and initially opened with less than 10% of its workforce, who had to work with social distancing measures. It emerged that the Scottish Government had paid a further £49 million from Covid Support Funds to Ferguson Marine.

=== Further delays ===
In February 2022, at least 400 electrical cables installed aboard Glen Sannox were found to be too short to reach equipment. By the end of September 2022, only 26% of cables had been replaced. CMAL warned; "The current rate at which cable is pulled presents a serious threat to the project". In April 2022 Dr Spyros Hirdaris, then an associate professor of marine technology in Aalto University in Finland, where the engine manufacturer Wärtsilä is based, stated that there was a high possibility that the engines would not work, as they had sat idle for six years. In November of the same year Ferguson Marine announced the ferries would rely on diesel alone for an unquantified period as they required bespoke vacuum sensors, with a lead-term of 36 weeks for delivery, in order to comply with refrigerated LNG regulations.

In May 2022 Jim McColl blamed the Scottish government for the problems with the contract, however Nicola Sturgeon claimed that the contract had saved 400 jobs. In the meantime island community groups said the continued disruption and unreliability of ferry services had left them in a critical situation. In the year to March 2021, Caledonian MacBrayne had been fined £3.2 million by Transport Scotland for delays, whilst on occasion ferry customers became aggressive after service disruption following ferry breakdowns.

As of December 2022 Glen Sannox was expected to be delivered five years behind schedule, between March and May 2023, a deadline that was not met. Its sister ship, provisionally designated Hull 802 (later named MV Glen Rosa), was expected to be delivered in the first quarter of 2024. Both ships are also reported to be unlikely to operate their designated routes while the £130 million project to convert existing infrastructure in the ports to handle the new ferries remains incomplete; with (as of September 2022) the £40 million upgrade of Ardrossan's port, from which Glen Sannox will operate, yet to start due to complexities on how the bill will be split between Transport Scotland, the port's owner, and North Ayrshire council. This is believed to lead to a further three years delay on the new ferry serving that route.

=== 2023 delays ===
In March 2023 the Ferguson Marine chief executive revealed additional delays: an "absolute deadline" of December 2023 for the first ship, though hoping for completion in the autumn, and the late summer of 2024 for the second ship.

In May 2023, Wellbeing Economy Secretary Neil Gray admitted to the Scottish Parliament that it would likely be cheaper to scrap Hull 802 and start again rather than see the ship through to completion, but affirmed that the Scottish Government would still push ahead with finishing the existing vessel, as a new ferry could not be deployed until 2027 at the earliest. The plan required him to issue Ministerial Written Authority to civil servants authorising continued spending on the ferry.

By July 2023, the cost of Glen Sannox had risen by another £20 million, and further delays put the planned delivery by the end of 2023 in doubt. However, Ferguson chief executive David Tydeman assured MSPs that the ferry "should be available to passengers in spring 2024" – as expected.

As of July 2023, both ferries are five years behind schedule and will cost more than three times the £97 million original contract. Ferguson Marine said the latest increase brought the total cost to around £351 million. By the September of that year, a failed safety audit meant that MV Glen Sannox was further delayed: among other issues, the Maritime and Coastguard Agency (MCA) insisted on the installation of additional staircases as a condition of approving a safety audit. The work means that planned sea trials of the Glen Sannox have been delayed until the first quarter of 2024, raising doubts over whether the ship will be available for the start of the 2024 summer season. Meeting MCA safety regulations ultimately meant that the passenger capacity of both ferries had to be cut from a planned 1,000 to 852.

By the end of September 2023, Ferguson chief executive David Tydeman told the Scottish Government's Net Zero, Energy and Transport Committee that MV Glen Rosa had been further delayed and that its completion date had been pushed back from the end of 2024 to the end of May 2025. An additional £10 million in unstated costs identified since June 2023 also pushed the cost of both ferries to more than £360 million.

=== 2024 delays ===
In February 2024 it was announced that Glen Sannox had begun her sea trials, but her projected in-service date had slipped further, to late May; then in March 2024 that her handover was likely delayed to July/August. Ferguson Marine CEO David Tydeman was dismissed after the announcement of the further delay.

In July 2024 it was announced that there would be a further delay, to at least the end of September 2024, before handover would take place, and problems supercooling LNG fuel pipes then made a September handover unachievable, with an additional delay of at least a fortnight. The additional delay made the ferries more than seven years late. Ferguson Marine was meant to hand over the long-delayed boat to CalMac on Monday October 14th, 2024. However, when the revised hand over date was reached, the Ferguson Marine CEO John Petticrew told Holyrood MSPs that a new handover date would need to be arranged because the vessel had suffered a total power failure during the previously reported 'successful' sea trials. The power blackout caused extensive damage to the vessel's electrical power systems. A partial refit will be required to replace the damaged power distribution components.

Before this additional delay trials the ferry was expected to carry passengers for a few days in December 2024, however it will thereafter be out of service for a few weeks for annual maintenance.

=== Delays through into 2026 ===
According to a delivery update from the shipyard to the Scottish Parliament’s Net Zero, Energy and Transport Committee in December 2025, the completion of MV Glen Rosa is now expected in the fourth quarter of 2026, reflecting further delay to the ferry’s build programme. Following handover to Caledonian Maritime Assets Ltd and subsequent sea trials and familiarisation, the vessel may not enter service until 2027.

== Further problems after entering service ==
Glen Sannox was taken out of service for annual maintenance in November 2025, but was unable to return to service in February 2026 as planned. It was reported that a further month was required to repair a winch assembly, and that this was to be achieved by cannibalising the unfinished Glen Rosa.

== Inquiries ==
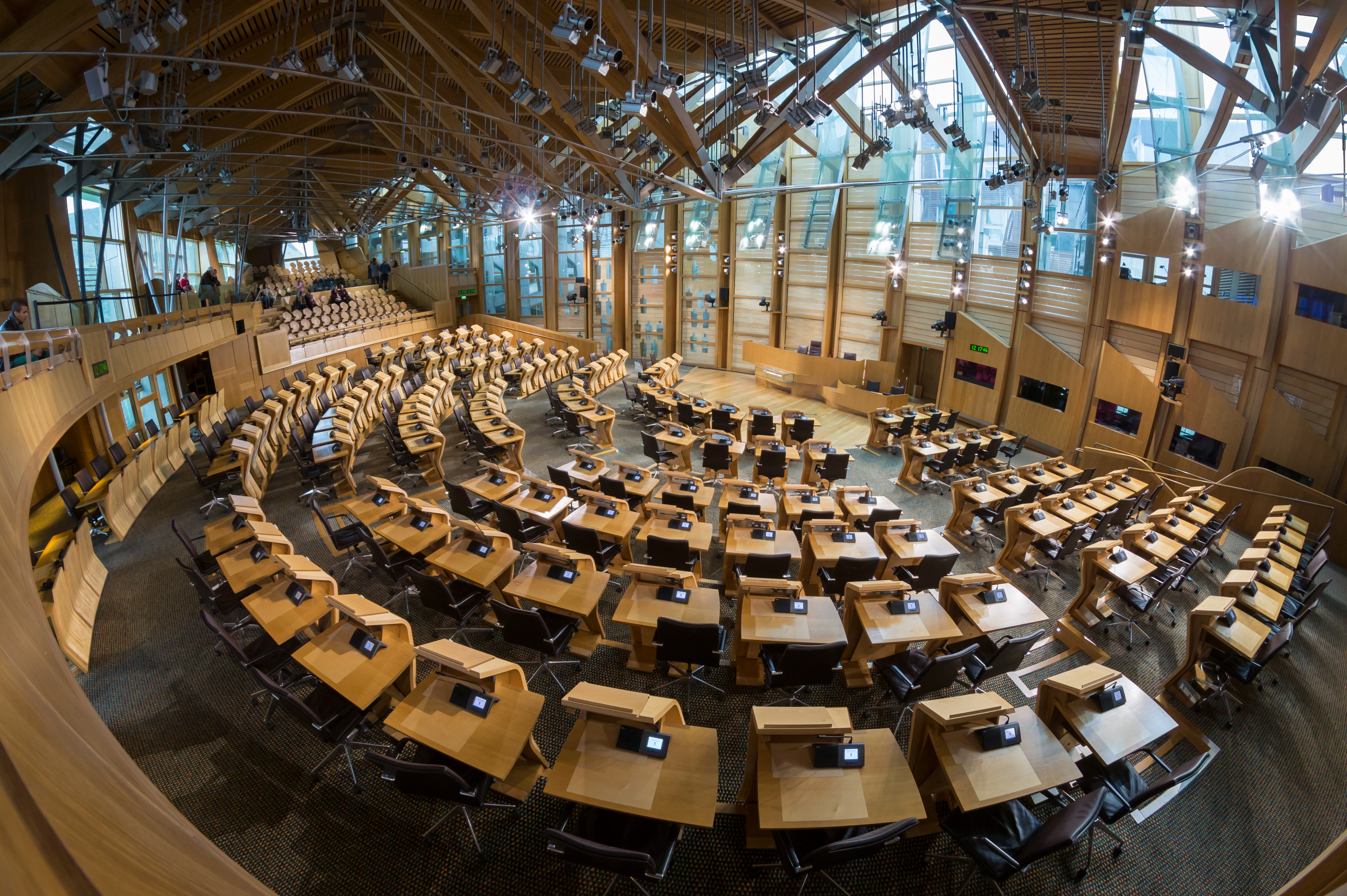
The main chamber in the Scottish Parliament

The Scottish Parliament's Rural Economy and Connectivity Committee published a report in December 2020 after a 12-month inquiry. The report branded the situation a "catastrophic failure" of management. Further inquiries are being made by the parliament's Audit Committee and following a public petition, by the Net Zero, Energy and Transport Committee.

A report by Audit Scotland in March 2022 found the total cost to have risen to £240 million. Audit Scotland also found "insufficient evidence to explain why Scottish Ministers made [the] decision" to award the contract to Ferguson Marine. The Auditor General, Stephen Boyle, described his "frustration" at not being able to review all the documentation relating to the awarding of the contract for the two ferries. Former SNP Deputy Leader Jim Sillars accused the Scottish Government of criminal "misconduct in public office" and lodged a complaint to Police Scotland requesting they investigate the missing documents. This call was later supported by the Scottish Conservatives transport minister Graham Simpson and SNP-led North Ayrshire Council, but Police Scotland confirmed they were not investigating the allegations.

Just before a Parliamentary debate on the contract, Jenny Gilruth, Scotland's junior transport minister, produced an email to show that the contract was ultimately approved by Derek Mackay, a disgraced previous junior transport minister who left the government in February 2020. The same email trail showed that the final decision was escalated to John Swinney, the Deputy First Minister and Cabinet Finance Secretary, before the contract was finally awarded. Civil servants waited until he could be briefed before awarding the contract so he could check there were "no banana skins". He confirmed that the contract should proceed. Swinney subsequently claimed he was only providing "budget approval", rather than approval for the contract itself, as there would be "significant inefficiency" in Government if a senior Cabinet Minister was involved in approving every contract. Keith Brown, the then Cabinet Secretary for the Economy, signed the contract on behalf of the Scottish Government, but he also denied responsibility claiming to sign in lieu of Mackay who was on holiday at the time.

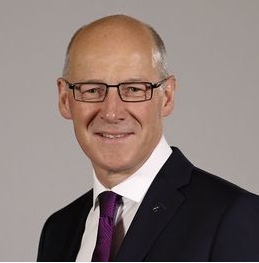
John Swinney, the former Deputy First Minister of Scotland

In a written response to the Public Audit Committee, Mackay said that he had "confidence" in the recommendation, and that there was expectation the contract would receive "sufficient monitoring and oversight". Scottish Conservatives transport spokesman Graham Simpson called for a public inquiry into the fiasco. Nicola Sturgeon told the Scottish Parliament, the "buck stops with me", claiming "lessons will be learned". She promised a full review but stopped short of a public inquiry.

In September 2022, Transport Scotland published a report by consultants Ernst and Young called "Project Neptune" which concluded that having multiple state agencies involved in the procurement process led to confusion over roles and responsibilities. The report suggested introducing a possible "Ferries Commissioner", but added this could cause further confusion with "another stakeholder in an already crowded sector".

Following the BBC's disclosure of documents suggesting that Ferguson Marine had benefited from preferential treatment in the procurement process, John Swinney told the Scottish Parliament on 27 September 2022 that Audit Scotland would again investigate the issue.

By the end of September 2022, the cost estimates from Ferguson Marine to put both ferries into service had risen by another £100 million to a total of £340 million. John Swinney stated that "no decision" would be made to release more public money towards the cost of completing the ferries until "due diligence" was carried out by the Scottish Government on the company, supported by external, independent financial advisors. It was announced that Nicola Sturgeon would give evidence to the Public Audit Committee in November 2022. There, she "completely and utterly" refuted there was anything untoward in the procurement process, but that there were powerful arguments in favour of Ferguson Marine given it was the last shipbuilder on the lower Clyde and thousands of jobs were at stake.

In late November 2022, Audit Scotland announced that it was unable to account for £128.25 million in public money spent by Ferguson Marine on the ferries. Furthermore, it was unable to trace how a £30 million Scottish Government loan to Ferguson was spent.

In the spring of 2023 the Scottish Government commissioned a report by the consulting firm Teneo, at the cost of £620,000, to give an independent assessment on the value for money of completing the ferries rather than scrapping them. The full report, which is subject to a non-disclosure agreement, concluded that it would be cheaper to construct an entirely new ship elsewhere rather than complete Hull 802. The Scottish Government decided to continue building the ship, with Economy Secretary Neil Gray telling the Scottish Parliament that a new vessel could not be deployed before at least May 2027. Gray said that the time that the decision to continue the construction of the Glen Rosa did not constitute a "blank cheque". However, the Greenock Telegraph subsequently reported that the value for money study into the MV Glen Rosa considered it likely that costs would rise even further in future based on Ferguson Marine's past record.
