= List of ships built by A. & J. Inglis =

This is a list of ships built by A & J Inglis, Glasgow, Scotland.

== Ships ==
473 ships were built by A. & J. Inglis between 1863 and 1963

Ships built by A. & J. Inglis
Launched	Ship's name at launch	Tonnage (GRT)	Yard No.	Notes
1863	Blanche	246	1	Iron-construction steamer. First vessel of the new shipyard. Propelled by a simple 2 cylinder steam engine with 40nhp and 1 screw. Launched on Wednesday, 8 April 1863.
1863	Cheduba	660	3	For British India Steam Navigation Company Glasgow & London. Sunk in 1869 - Lost in Bay of Bengal.
1863	SS Euphrates	488	4	Steamer for William MacKinnon. This was the first of 45 steamers to be built for what was to become a highly valued client – the British India Line; Sold for scrapping at Bombay in September 1892.
1863	SS Wallabi	103	6	Iron steamship launched on Thursday, 15 October 1863 for T. McArthur, Sydney, NSW. Unregistered in 1892. Vessel broken up in New Zealand.
1863	SS Laurel	387	7	Iron passenger cargo vessel launched on Thursday, 3 September 1863 for Glasgow & Londonderry Steam Packet Co. Propelled by 2cyl steam engine with 140nhp using 1 screw. History: She was ordered for Glasgow-Sligo service but sold clandestinely before completion in 1863 to Henry Lafone, Liverpool on behalf Confederate Government Treasury Dept. for the Confederate Navy. She was used as supply ship to CSS Shenandoah, when she carried armaments and crew for commissioning of Shenandoah at Islas Desertas, Madeira on 18–20 October 1864. Laurel ran the blockade, arriving Charleston on 1 December 1864. However, the CS Navy found her unsuitable, because her 11.6-knot actual top speed was too slow and 11 feet with only 500 bales was too deep draught for the Cape Fear entrances. Thus she was purchased by the Treasury Department and renamed Confederate States, carrying a cotton cargo via Nassau to Liverpool, where she was laid up and sold in April 1865 to Goole Steam Shipping Co Ltd (John Moody & Richard Moxon), Goole. Lengthened and re-engined by Martin Samuelson & Co at Hull in 1869. 1882 sold to Peter Hutchison, Glasgow. 1887 sold to unknown owner in Bordeaux. 1888 Peter Hutchison, Glasgow. Sank on 28 November 1905 in Le Havre Roads after collision with SS Gregory (Booth Line).
1863	PSS City of Brisbane	633	8	Launched on Thursday, 15 October 1863 for Australasian Steam Navigation Company, Sydney Sold in 1880 to Newcastle Steamship Co, Newcastle, NSW; Sold in 1891 to Newcastle & Hunter River Steamship Co; Sold in 1911 to J. & J. Daley, Sydney. Scuttled off Sydney Heads on 21 March 1925.
1864	Cawarra	439	14	A paddle steamer that sank in 1866 in Newcastle Harbour, New South Wales, Australia with the loss of 60 lives. The sinking was one of the worst maritime disasters in Australian history.
1864	Carham	158	18	
1865	PSS Waverley	592	25	Iron paddle steamer launched on Tuesday, 16 May 1865 with 2cyl oscillating steam engine with 280nhp. Used for Dublin-Douglas-Silloth service by North British Steam Packet Company. Built to replace a twin funnelled Tyneside built Waverley of similar type she proved too big for this run. Thus sold in 1868 to London & South Western Railway for Southampton/Channel Islands service. Wrecked on 5 June 1873 in fog on Platte Boue Rock, Guernsey, all saved.
1865	Erl King	1,671	26	Built for Robertson & Co. London. Steam auxiliary ship, built for the Far Eastern trade. The first ship to carry a cargo of tea through the Suez Canal. Wrecked on 15 December 1891 at Long Reef, Key West, Florida, United States.
1866	Dunlop	61	34	
1866	Black Dwarf	81	35	
1866	PS Dandie Dinmont	205	36	Paddle steamer launched on Wednesday, 11 April 1866 for North British Steam Packet Company, Glasgow. Later sold to Southampton owners. Scrapped in 1902.
1866	Meg Merilees	213	37	
1869	SS Oberon	1,236	64	Composite construction steam ship
1869	Norman Court	833	65	Clipper ship, wrecked on 29 March 1883 at Cymyran Bay near Ynys Feurig, Anglesey, Wales with the loss of two crew.
1872	Java	1,477	97	Sold for Scrapping on 24 June 1904. Broken up at Bombay
1873	PS Pekin	3,076	100	Paddle steamer Hulked at Shanghai in July 1912, later towed to Wuhu. Hulk seized by Japanese in 1941 and towed to Shanghai. Bombed and sunk by Allied aircraft in 1942.
1873	PS Shanghai	3,080	101	Iron paddle steamer
1873	PS Ichang	1,782	102	Iron paddle steamer. Wrecked at Ning Po River entrance.
1874	Hankow	3,073	107	Iron paddle steamer. Transferred 1886 from Yangtze to Hong Kong/Canton service. Gutted by fire 14 October 1906 at Canton Steamer Wharf, Hong Kong with loss of 130 lives. Towed to Shanghai 1907 and converted to hulk and moved to Hankou as transhipment godown. Transferred to Shashi in 1930, and to Yichang in 1938. Destroyed by American bombing during WW2.
1874	Brisbane	891	110	Built for the Eastern & Australian Mail Steamship Co Ltd. Ran aground on 10 October 1881 off Quail Island, Victoria and was wrecked without loss of life.
1876	Tredagh	878	124	Built for the Drogheda Steam Packet Company. Acquired in 1902 by the Lancashire & Yorkshire Railway. Withdrawn in 1912, scrapped in 1914 at Preston, Lancashire.
1877	Loch Etive	1,288	134	Iron barque for Loch Line. In 1911 sold to French owners for £1350 and hulked. Later broken up at Genoa.
1878	Norah Creina	878	142	Built for the Drogheda Steam Packet Company. Acquired in 1902 by the Lancashire & Yorkshire Railway. Withdrawn in 1912 and scrapped in France.
1878	SS Purulia	1,554	144	Broken up at Bombay in 1903.
1878	SS Kinloch	425	147	Passenger and cargo vessel launched on Thursday, 30 May 1878, for Campbeltown & Glasgow Steam Packet Joint Stock Company, Campbeltown. Sold in 1926 to Channel Islands Packet Co., Jersey. Broken up at Borrowstounness, Q2/1929.
1878	Flinders	948	149	Flinders (1878) Passenger-cargo steamer built for Tasmanian Steam Navigation, which merged with Union Company in 1891, then owned by McIlwraith, McEacharn and Adelaide Steamship, hulked in 1911 after fire damage and beached on 4 September 1931 at Garden Island Ships Graveyard.
1880	Camorta	2,119	160	Steel steamer. Sunk on 6 May 1902, after she had left Madras with 89 crew and 650 passengers and headed for Rangoon, due there on 5 May 1802. She never made port, foundering in a cyclone with the loss of every person aboard.
1881	SS Compta	2,094	161	Steel steamer
1882	Rewa	3,900	166	Wrecked on 21 August 1913 north of Cape St Vincent, en route from Newcastle to Savona with coal.
1882	Waroonga	2,506	172	Built for Gray, Dawes & Co, Glasgow; Sold to Japan in 1913 and renamed Bansei Baru. Scrapped in 1926.
1883	Sirsa	2,610	177	Owned by the British India Steam Navigation Company; Sold for scrapping on 21 August 1908 and broken up at Bombay.
1886	SS Palitana	2,998	193	Passenger cargo vessel. Launched on Thursday, 21 January 1886. Engines by A & J Inglis Pointhouse, Glasgow. Triple-expansion steam engine. 2,441 ihp, 12 knots. History: British India Steam Navigation Company Glasgow & London, 1922 Soc.d'Avances Commerciales, Alexandria; Sunk on 4 April 1922 shortly after being sold, so soon she had not yet been renamed, 70 miles NE of Derna on a voyage from Alexandria to New York City
1887	Karagola	1,168	200	Built for the British India Steam Navigation Company. Gutted by fire on 20 April 1901 at Akyab, Burma and subsequently scrapped.
1888	Purnea	3,306	203	Cargo and passenger vessel for British India Steam Navigation Company Launched on 20 October 1888.
1894	Safra El-Bahr	675	232	Built as a Royal Yacht for the Khedive of Egypt Used from 1915 to 1919 as a patrol vessel by the Royal Navy; Sold in 1920 to G. C. Dracoulis, Ithaca, Greece and renamed Ithaki. Bombed and sunk on 20 April 1941 at Suda Bay, Crete.
1895	Dandie Dinmont	218	237	
1895	Iverna	995	239	Built for the Drogheda Steam Packet Company. Acquired in 1902 by the Lancashire & Yorkshire Railway Scrapped in 1912.
1896	PS Talisman	234	241	Talisman was launched on Monday, 30 March 1896. With single diagonal steam engine and a haystack boiler she achieved a speed on trials of 18.1 knots. She was used for the Craigendoran to Rothesay service of the North British Steam Packet Company. Her tonnage was increased to 279 tons in 1910 and then to 293 tons in 1919. She became minesweeper HMS Talla during the First World War. She was scrapped by TW Ward at Barrow in 1934.
1897	Varuna			Steam yacht built for American Eugene Higgins.
1897	SS Bruce	1,154	245	Registered in 1900 at St. John's in Newfoundland & Labrador by Reid Newfoundland Co as part of their Alphabet Fleet. This was a fleet of vessels owned and operated by the Reid Newfoundland Company as a provision of the 1898 Railway contract between the Dominion of Newfoundland and the Reid Newfoundland Company. The vessels were named after places in Scotland, the native homeland of Sir Robert Gillespie Reid, founder of the Reid Newfoundland Railway Company. The ships were employed as coastal vessels to service the remote communities of the island and the coast of Labrador to operate a mail and passenger service to those communities. Lost off Louisburg, Nova Scotia on 4 March 1911. She was replaced by the SS Bruce II.
1898	SS Magpie	1,227	246	Passenger cargo vessel for cross channel Irish Sea route. Inverted triple-expansion steam engine. Single screw. Launched on Tuesday, 8 February 1898. Registered in Glasgow. History: G & J Burns Ltd Glasgow. 1922 owners restyled Burns & Laird Lines Ltd. 1923 new oil-fired boilers and accommodation improved by D&W Henderson. 30 May 1929 renamed SS Lairdsgrove. After 1939 she no longer carried passengers. Sold 1948 to Metal Industries Faslane, who used her as an accommodation ship. Not broken up until 1950. Scrapped in 1950.
1898	PS Kenilworth	333	247	Paddle steamer launched in 1898. Owners: North British Steam Packet Company, London & North Eastern Railway (LNER). She was commissioned because of the success of PS Talisman as a similar ship. Despite her old fashioned single diagonal machinery she achieved 18.6 knots on her trials and this was more than acceptable. She joined PS Talisman on the Craigendoran to Rothesay service and in doing so replaced Redgauntlet, who was then used as an excursion steamer. She was refurbished and reboilered in 1915 and saw limited war service between 1917 and 1919 as a minesweeper on the South Coast. Upon her return in 1919 she reopened the Arrochar excursion service. She continued for the North British Steam Packet Company and later for the LNER until withdrawn in the summer of 1937 and was broken up the following year by her original builders A. & J. Inglis, in the yard where she had been built.
1899	SS Urlana	5,253	250	Built in 1899 for the British India Steam Navigation Company, Glasgow & London. She was powered by a steam triple-expansion engine 3 cylinder of 2,156ihp. Engines by shipbuilder. In 1924 she was sold to Fratelli Beraldo, Genoa and renamed Operosita. In 1928 she was acquired by SA Marittima San Pietro, Genoa, renamed Carmine Filomena and used as an Italian passenger/cargo steamer. On 2 July 1937 she ran aground on Lundy Island when outward bound from Cardiff for Genoa with a cargo of coal.
1899	Waverley	449	257	
1899	SS Glencoe	336	258	Registered in 1900 at St. John's in Newfoundland & Labrador by Reid Newfoundland Co as part of their Alphabet Fleet. Sold for scrap in June 1959 at Sorel, Quebec.
1900	SS Argyle	439	259	Registered in 1900 at St. John's in Newfoundland & Labrador by Reid Newfoundland Co as part of their Alphabet Fleet. Sold to the S.S. Argyle Steamship Co. in 1941. Lost near Cuba on 31 July 1946.
1900	SS Clyde	439	260	Registered in 1900 at St. John's in Newfoundland & Labrador by Reid Newfoundland Co as part of their Alphabet Fleet; Sold to Crosbie and Co in 1948. She was lost at Williamsport, White Bay, Newfoundland & Labrador on 17 December 1951.
1900	SS Dundee	439	261	Registered in 1900 at St. John's in Newfoundland & Labrador by Reid Newfoundland Co as part of their Alphabet Fleet. Stranded and lost on Grassy Island near Carmanville, Newfoundland 25 December 1919.
1900	SS Ethie	440	262	Registered in 1900 at St. John's in Newfoundland & Labrador by Reid Newfoundland Co as part of their Alphabet Fleet. Lost on 11 December 1919 at Martin's Point, Bonne Bay, Newfoundland & Labrador.
1900	SS Fife	439	263	Registered in 1900 at St. John’s in Newfoundland & Labrador by Reid Newfoundland Co as part of their Alphabet Fleet. Lost at Twin Islands, Strait of Belle Isle, Northern Peninsula, Newfoundland & Labrador on 17 November 1900 on her maiden voyage.
1900	SS Home	439	264	Registered in 1900 at St. John’s in Newfoundland & Labrador by Reid Newfoundland Co as part of their Alphabet Fleet. A & J Inglis were a very busy shipyard in 1900 having built six Alphabet Fleet vessels that year alone. Stranded at Jersey Harbour, Fortune Bay, Newfoundland & Labrador on 18 November 1952.
1904	SS Sheila	280	275	MacBrayne Stornoway mail boat. Ran aground off Loch Torridon 2 January 1927.
1905	Pioneer	241	278	Built for David MacBrayne. Withdrawn in 1943 and laid up at Oban, Argyllshire. Purchased by the Admiralty post-war and used as a floating laboratory in Portland Harbour, Dorsetshire. Scrapped at Rotterdam, Netherlands in 1958.
1907	HMY Alexandra	2,113	280	Built as a Royal Yacht; Sold in 1925 to Det Nordenfjelde Dampskibsselskab and renamed Prins Olav. Used as a luxury cruise ship. Bombed and sunk in 1940 off Lofoten, Norway.
1906	Marmion	403	282	
1908	TS Vanadis	1,092	284	Steam yacht built for C K G Billings, New York, United States. Sold in 1916 to M F Plant, then to the Imperial Russian Navy in 1917 and renamed Poryv. Sold in 1919 to Baron de Linder and renamed Finlandia. Sold in 1925 to Montague Grahame-White and renamed Ianara. After a further sale in 1935, the ship was scrapped in 1938.
1910	Weeroona	1,412	290	Built for Huddart Parker Ltd, Melbourne, Australia. Later sold to Bay Steamers Ltd, Melbourne. To United States Army in 1942 and then the Australian Government in 1945. Scrapped in 1951.
1910	Tavolara	462	292	Built for Ferrovie dello Stato, Italy; Sold in 1926 to the Compagnia Sardia di Armamento e Navigazione, Genoa. Renamed Terranova in 1928; Sold in 1937 to Tirrenia SA di Navigazione. Requisitioned in 1940 by the Italian Navy. Seized by the Kriegsmarine in September 1943. Renamed Innsbruck and used as a hospital ship. Sunk on 10 June 1944 in an air raid at Venice but raised and repaired. Returned to Tirrenia SA di Navigazione in 1946. Scrapped in Palermo in January 1964.
1911	Fury	970	293	For Royal Navy. Sold for breaking in 1921.
1911	Bruselas	2,311	297	Built for the Compania Argentina de Navegación, Buenos Aires, Argentina. Sold in 1942 to Compania Argentina de Navegación Dodero. Sold in 1949 to Compania de Navegación Fluvial Argentina. Sold in 1961 to Flota Argentinade Navegación Fluvial. Sold in 1976 to Ferroductil, Buenos Aires. Scrapped in 1972 but not deleted from shipping registers until 1982.
1912	Erin's Isle	633	300	Passenger paddle steamer built for the Belfast and County Down Railway for £24,000 and launched on Wednesday, 12 June 1912. Requisitioned by the Admiralty 20 November 1915 as an auxiliary minesweeper. Sunk 7 March 1919 by a drifting mine in the North Edinburgh Channel north of Thanet. 23 men were lost and 28 survivors rescued.
1913	PS Cabo Santa Maria	2,648	304	Paddle steamer launched on Wednesday, 18 June 1913. Propelled by 3-cylinder steam engine with low pressure turbine. Renamed to General Artigas in 1921. History: Hamburg Südamerikanische Dampfschiffahrts-Gesellschaft. 1921 Argentina Cia de Naveira, Buenos Aires. 1923 Cia Uruguaya de Nav, Montevideo. 1941 Cia Argentina de Nav Dodero. 1949 Cia de Navegacion Fluvial Argentina. Sold to Buenos Aires breakers in April 1966 and scrapped in April 1966.
1913	PS Cabo Corrientes	2,627	305	Paddle steamer launched on Monday, 6 October 1913 for Hamburg Südamerikanische Dampfschiffahrts-Gesellschaft. Sold in 1921 to Argentina Cia de Naveira, Buenos Aires and renamed General Alvear. 1922 Argentine Nav Co (Nicolás Mihanovich). 1931 Cia Argentina de Nav. Mihanovich. 1942 Cia Argentina de Nav Dodero. 1949 Cia de Nav Fluvial Argentina. Sank on passage Buenos Aires to Montevideo after stranding four days earlier in fog at Punta Yeguas in the River Plate.
1915	HMS Fair Maid	703	309	
1916	HMS Duchess of Buccleuch	656	310	
1919	SS Killarney	1,578	311	SS Killarney was ordered by G. & J. Burns in February 1915 but not laid down until August 1917 because of the First World War. She was then two years on the stocks and was refused by Burns. She was to be named Moorfowl but was completed as Killarney for City of Cork Steam Packet Co. She was transferred to G.& J. Burns on 1 July 1920 and given her intended name of Moorowl. Owners became Burns & Laird Lines Ltd on 25 July 1922. She was renamed Lairdsmoor on 30 May 1929. On passage from Dublin to Greenock in dense fog she collided with Shaw Savill's Taranaki off Black Head at 03:20 hrs on 7 April 1937. Taranaki rescued 33 crew and 6 passengers but Lairdsmoor's master, Capt. John Campbell, and one of her firemen, Edward McBride, were lost.
1932	North Carr	250	921	Built for Northern Lighthouse Board. Withdrawn in 1975 and preserved at Anstruther, Fife as of 2026.
1935	Talisman	544	956	DEPV Talisman was the world's first diesel electric paddle vessel, having four British Polar diesel engines, connected to electric generators. During the Second World War she was used as HMS Aristocrat, serving as an anti-aircraft ship. Her diesel engines caused some trouble and she was re-engined in 1954 but this reduced her service speed from 17 knots to 12 knots. She remained popular, with a passenger capacity of over 1250 and had Decca radar fitted in late 1958. She continued in summer service until her withdrawal in 1966.
1937	Lady Sylvia	199	997	Built for the Union Steamship Company of British Columbia Canada. Renamed Lady Rose in 1937. Used by the Royal Canadian Army Service Corps during the Second World War. Returned to Union Steamship Co in 1946. Sold in 1951 to Harbour Navigation Co Ltd, Vancouver. Sold in 1969 to Alberni Steam Navigation Co, Port Alberni. Sold in 1979 to Diversified Holdings Ltd, Victoria, British Columbia. Sold in 1982 to Lady Rose Marine Services. In active service until 2007, when it was sold to be refurbished as a floating restaurant.
1940	Empire Gat	871	1088	Built for the Ministry of War Transport.
1940	Empire Deep	871	1115	Built for the Ministry of War Transport.
1941	Lincoln Castle	598	1024	Built for the London & North Eastern Railway. Passed to British Railways in 1948. Withdrawn in 1978 and sold for use as a floating pub. Initially at Hessle, East Riding of Yorkshire and later at Immingham, Lincolnshire. Closed in 2006 due to corrosion. Controversially scrapped in 2010.
1940	SS Empire Maiden	813	1151	Built for the Ministry of War Transport. Bombed on 14 June 1943 and sunk at Pantelleria, Italy. Wreck sold in 1947 to Italian buyers, raised and towed to Messina, arriving on 5 July 1948. Repaired, with a new steam engine being fitted Sold to G Dagnino, Italy; Sold in 1953 to Astrolea Società Anonima, Italy and renamed Asteria. Sold in 1958 to Lugari & Filippi, Italy and renamed Sanjacopo. New diesel engine fitted in 1962; Sold in 1968 to Società Anonima di Navigazione, Italy; Sold in 1972 to Lidia Melodia Ved. Lugari, Italy. Scrapped in July 1974 at Spezia, Italy.
1941	Oxlip (K123)	950	1164	Flower Class Corvette K123. Launched on 28 August 1941. Completed 28 December 1941. Propelled by reciprocating 4 cylinder triple expansion. Took part in Operation Torch, Operation Overlord and the Kola Run. Transferred to Irish Naval Service in 1946 and commissioned as LE Maev. Arrived for scrapping at Haulbowline Industries, Cork 1971. Scrapped at Rushbrooke, County Cork.
1941	Empire Spinney	872	1089	Built for the Ministry of War Transport; Sold in 1946 to General Steam Navigation Co Ltd and renamed Peregrine; Sold in 1965 to D Vassilatos & others, Greece and renamed Libya; Sold later that year to Elias Condos & others, Greece; Sold in 1971 to S Kondopoulos & Co, Greece and renamed Rozmary.
1942	Empire Fay	807	1184	Built for the Ministry of War Transport; Sold in 1946 to Shell Company of East Africa and renamed Kleinella. To Shell-Mex & BP in 1948 and renamed Shellbrit. Renamed BP Marketer in 1952; Sold in 1964 to Sarda Bunkers SpA, Italy and renamed Sarroch. Scrapped in September 1983 in Naples, Italy.
1943	Empire Gypsy	813	1175	Built for the MOWT; Sold in 1948 to the Indian Navy and became INS Sambhar. Removed from list of Indian Navy vessels in 1976.
1943	HMS Helmsdale		1185	River Class Frigate F253. Launched on Saturday, 5 June 1943. Completed 15 October 1943. Propelled by geared turbines. Atlantic escort sank U743. Underwater Detection Establishment in Portland for trials since 9 September 1944. Took part in search for HMS Affray. Arrived for scrapping on 7 November 1957. Scrapped at Faslane.
1943	Empire Coppice	813	1190	Built for the MOWT Sold in 1948 to Kuwait Oil Co and renamed Amin. Operated under the management of Anglo-Iranian Oil Co. To Shell-Mex & BP in 1953 and renamed Shell Fitter; Sold in 1964 to D I Philippopoulos, Greece and renamed Aliki; Sold in 1966 to Naftiki Adrotiki, Greece, then sold in 1968 to Marine Water Supply Co Ltd, Greece. Scrapped in September 1969 at Perama, Greece.
1943	Candytuft	1,015	1221	Flower-class corvette built for the Royal Navy. Transferred on 5 January 1944 to the Royal Canadian Navy and renamed Long Branch; Sold into merchant service in 1946 and renamed Rexton Kent II, later renamed Rexton Kent. Scuttled in 1966 off Nova Scotia.
1943	Empire Harvest	813	1225	Built for the Ministry of War Transport; Sold in 1946 to Shell-Mex & BP and renamed Shelbrit 5. Renamed BP Engineer in 1952. Scrapped in June 1965 in Antwerp, Belgium.
1943	Empire Bute	813	1286	Built for the Ministry of War Transport; Sold in 1946 to the French Government and renamed Miliana; Sold in 1948 to Scotto Pugliese Fils & Cie, Algeria and renamed Rivoli; Sold in 1952 to Bulk Oil Steamship Co Ltd and renamed Pass of Drumochter; Sold in 1962 to Lugari & Filippi, Italy and renamed Santa Giulia; Sold in 1971 to Ciana Anopo Compagnia di Navigazione & Bunkeraggi SpA, Italy. Scrapped at La Spezia, Italy in 1971.
1944	Empire Dombey	813	1227	Built for the Ministry of War Transport; Sold in 1947 to F T Everard & Sons Ltd and renamed Allurity; Sold in October 1964 for scrapping in the Netherlands but resold. Scrapped in April 1965 in Bruges, Belgium.
1944	Empire Jura	813	1282	Built for the Ministry of War Transport; Sold in 1946 to Van Castricum & Co Ltd, London and renamed Samshoo; Sold in 1951 to Bulk Oil Steamship Co Ltd and renamed Pass of Glenogle; Sold in 1961 to A Garolla & Compagnie, Italy and renamed Marcello Garolla; Sold in 1969 to Sarda Bunkers SpA, Italy and renamed Marcello G. On 19 February 1972, she developed a list in bad weather at Naples, capsized and sank. Raised on 2 August 1972, declared a total constructive loss but repaired and returned to service. Scrapped in March 1979 at Naples.
1944	Empire Orkney	813	1287	Built for the Ministry of War Transport; Sold in 1950 to F T Everard & Sons Ltd and renamed Alchymist. Arrived on 3 May 1969 at Bruges, Belgium for scrapping.
1944	MV Vipya	470	Yard No.1043	Built for Nyasaland Railway Company
1945	Empire Shetland	890	1288	Built for the Ministry of War Transport; Sold in 1948 to the Kuwait Oil Co Ltd and renamed Adib; Sold in 1952 to Shell-Mex & BP and renamed BP Transporter. Scrapped in June 1965 in Antwerp, Belgium.
1945	Empire Belgrave	890	1299	Built for the Ministry of War Transport; Sold in 1947 to Shell Tankers and then sold again later that year to F T Everard. Struck a mine off Terschelling, Netherlands on 11 November 1947 and sank.
1945	Empire Campden	890	1300	Built for the Ministry of War Transport; Sold in 1947 to F T Everard and renamed Anonity; Sold in 1966 to John S Lastis, Greece and renamed Petrola II; Sold in 1969 to P C Chrissochoides and renamed Kalymnos. Ran aground off Rhodes and declared a constructive total loss. Scrapped in Piraeus in June 1970.
1945	Empire Fitzroy	890	1301	Built for the Ministry of War Transport; Sold in 1952 to F T Everard & Sons Ltd and renamed Alignity. Scrapped in November 1971 at Blyth, Northumberland.
1945	Empire Grosvenor	813	1302	Built for the Ministry of War Transport; Sold in 1947 to Anglo-Saxon Petroleum Co Ltd and renamed Frenulina. Lengthened in 1954, now 1,051 GRT. Laid up in 1962 at Singapore awaiting scrapping but sold to Teck Hwa Shipping Co, Panama and renamed Anlok; Sold later that year to National Oil Co Ltd, Panama and renamed Permina VI; Sold in 1974 to P T Bimoli, Indonesia and renamed Bimoli 01.
1945	Empire Tedship	890	1311	Built for the Ministry of War Transport; Sold in 1947 to Anglo-Saxon Petroleum Co Ltd and renamed Fischeria; Sold in 1951 to F T Everard & Sons Ltd and renamed Acuity; Sold in 1967 to Betamar Carriers Ltd, Somalia and renamed Vittoriosa. Converted in 1968 to a water carrier Sold in 1969 to Compania di Davide Russo & Co, Italy and renamed Neptunia. Scrapped in 1975 in Italy.
1946	Empire Tedport	950	1312	Built for the Ministry of War Transport; Sold in 1947 to Anglo-Saxon Petroleum Co Ltd and renamed Felipes; Sold in 1948 to Shell-Mex & BP and renamed Shelbrit 10. Renamed Shell Director in 1952. Scrapped in September 1966 at Bo’ness, West Lothian.
1946	Empire Tedmuir	950	1313	Built for the Ministry of War Transport; Sold in 1947 to Anglo-Saxon Petroleum Co Ltd and renamed Fusinus; Sold in 1949 to F T Everard & Sons Ltd and renamed Aquiety. Arrived in January 1965 at Bruges, Belgium for scrapping.
1946	Empire Tedrita	950	1314	Built for the Ministry of War Transport; Sold in 1947 to Anglo-Saxon Petroleum Co Ltd and renamed Fusus; Sold in 1956 to Kie Hock Shipping Co, Singapore. Rebuilt in 1957 and converted to take dry cargo Sold in 1962 to Palembang Shipping Co, Panama. Operated under the management of Kie Hock Shipping Co, Singapore; Sold in 1964 to Compagnia de Navigazione Gatun, Panama and renamed Monaco, remaining under Kie Hock's management Sold in 1965 to Compagnia Navigazione Thompson SA, Panama, and renamed Hanna, still under Kie Hock's management. Renamed Fataki later that year. Scrapped in July 1965 in Hong Kong.
1946	Waverley	693	1330P	Built as a passenger ferry for the London & North Eastern Railway. Transferred to Caledonian Steam Packet Company in 1948. Withdrawn in 1973 and sold to the Paddle Steamer Preservation Society for £1. Restored and in service as of 2026.
1949	SS Setter V	586	1395P	Whale catcher built for United Whalers Ltd (Bugge & Krogh-Hansen), London. Single screw steam ship. Launched on Tuesday, 24 May 1949. Completed in September 1948. Last Name: Otori Maru No. 22 (1960), Scrapped on 1 February 1966. Broken up at Shodoshima, Japan, 1966.
1951	Maid of Argyll	508	1491	Built for the Caledonian Steam Packet Company. Withdrawn in 1973 and sold in 1974 to Cycladic Cruises, Piraeus, Greece and renamed City of Piraeus. Renamed City of Corfu in 1993. A fire in 1997 saw her withdrawn from service. Reported to be derelict in 2002.
1951	Maid of Skelmorlie	508	1494	Built for the Caledonian Steam Packet Company. Withdrawn in 1972 and sold in 1973 to Italy and renamed Ala. In active service as of 2002.
1952	Busen 5	598	1503	Whale catcher launched on Tuesday, 10 June 1952. Drawing published in the Evening Times, 24 October 1952.
1953	Maid of the Loch	555	1474P	The last paddle steamer built in a Clyde shipyard. Built for the Caledonian Steam Packet Company. Withdrawn in 1981 and sold to the Loch Lomond Steamship Company. Under restoration as of 2011.
1960	Clyde	65	1643P	Tug and inspection launch built for Clyde Port Authority; Sold in 1973 to Donald MacLean, Ullapool, Ross-shire then resold to William Kennedy, Kyle of Lochalsh; Sold in 1984 to Invicta Line Cruises Ltd, Chatham, Kent; Sold in 1993 to Marine Services, Las Palmas, Canary Islands. Serving in a static rôle in 2002.
1962	MV Aigburth	1,037 (1987: 1,362)	1645P	Grab hopper dredger. Launched on Thursday, 17 May 1962. Completed in March 1963. Engines by Crossley Bros, Manchester. Vee oil 2SA 12cyl 2400 bhp machinery aft. Re-engined M12cy 4SA 1118 kW 1520 bhp 13kn 1scr Caterpillar 3512TA in 1999. History: British Transport Commission; prior to 1969 Dredging & Construction Co Ltd, Liverpool; 1980 Vof Banjaard BV, Breskens; 1987 lengthened; 1987 renamed Taurus; 1990 renamed Banjaard; 1996 converted to trailing suction hopper dredger; 1998 (optd Scheepvaart en Agentuur Mij Oosterlee BV, Breskens); 2007 renamed Inai Kesuma; 2007 Inai Kiara Sdn Bhd, Selangor Malaysia; still active in 2009.

== Cancelled orders ==
Ship's name	Tonnage (GRT)	Notes
Empire Tedellen	890	Coastal tanker for Ministry of War Transport.
Empire Tedfay	890	Coastal tanker for Ministry of War Transport.
Empire Tedflora	890	Coastal tanker for Ministry of War Transport.
Empire Tedmount	890	Coastal tanker for Ministry of War Transport.
Empire Tedrose	890	Coastal tanker for Ministry of War Transport.
