= Basket of Roses =

Painting by Henri Fantin-Latour

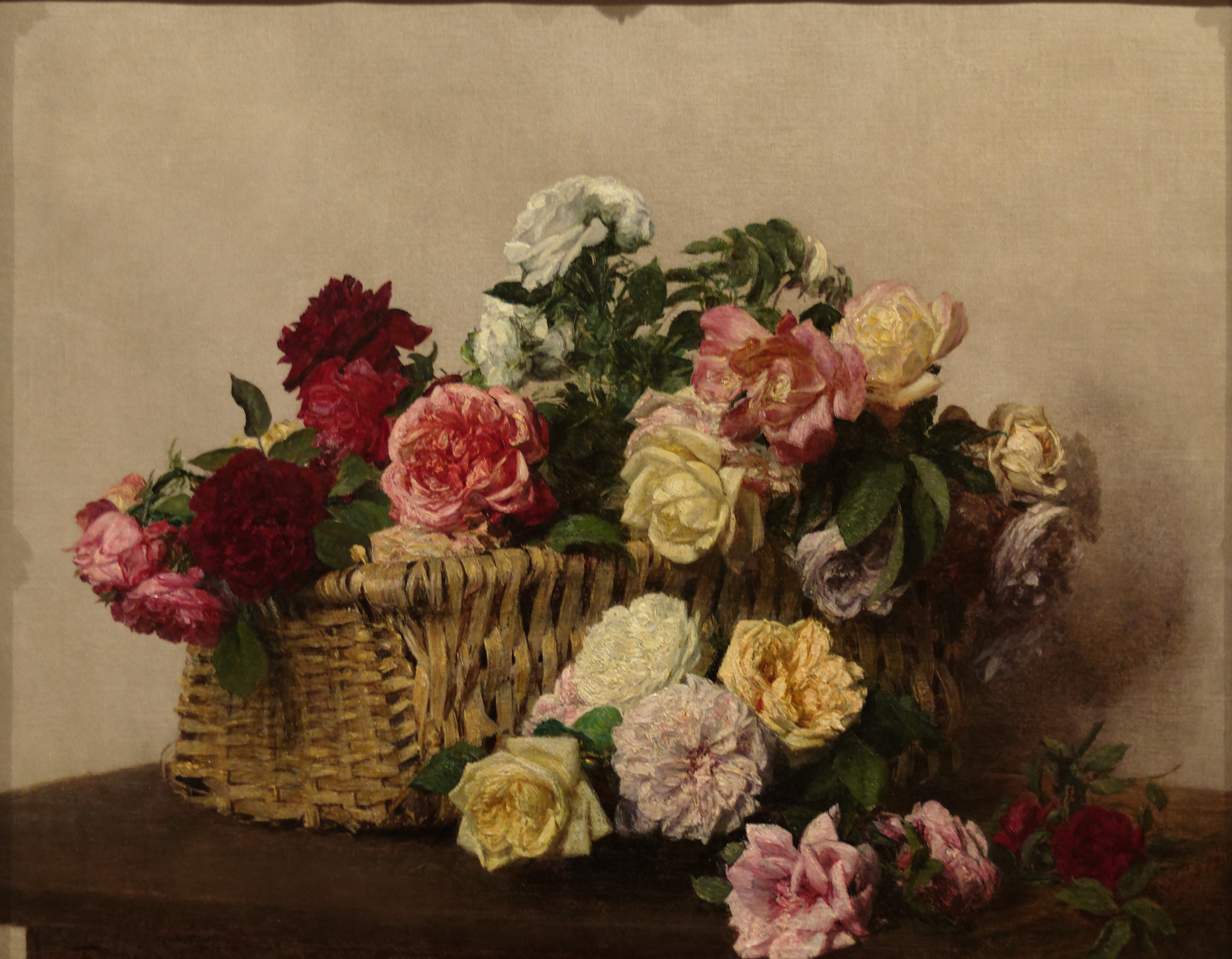
- Artist: Henri Fantin-Latour
- Year: 1885
- Type: oil painting
- Dimensions: 59 cm × 73.8 cm (23 in × 29.1 in)
- Location: Calouste Gulbenkian Museum; Lisbon

Basket of Roses is an oil-on-canvas painting by French painter Henri Fantin-Latour, executed in 1885. It is part of the Calouste Gulbenkian Museum, in Lisbon. It measures 59 by 73.8 cm and is dated and signed Fantin 85 at the lower left.

== History ==
The painting was purchased by Armenian-British collector Calouste Gulbenkian at a Christie's sale in London on May 9, 1924, from the Colnaghi Gallery. It belonged to the collection of Leonard Gow, of Craigendoran.

== Description ==
Fantin-Latour painted still lifes since the 1860s until the end of his career. The representation of roses appears arranged of multiple ways in many of his still lifes. This work shows on a monochrome background a basket occupying the whole composition, full of roses of different colors, rather in pale tones, white, pink or yellow. This cascading composition of roses overflowing from the basket recalls his painting Bouquet of Roses on a Marble Table (1885, Sterling and Francine Clark Institute of Williamstown). Each flower is presented with its unique qualities, contrasting with the rectilinear dimensions of the basket.
