= John Inglis (shipbuilder) =

Scottish engineer and shipbuilder

- Born: 1842; Glasgow
- Died: 13 July 1919 (aged 76–77)
- Education: University of Glasgow
- Occupations: Engineer, Shipbuilder
- Known for: Managing A. & J. Inglis shipyard
- Spouse: Agnes Denny (m. 1867, d. 1925)
- Children: Dr. Anthony Inglis, George Alexander Inglis, James Denny Inglis
- Awards: Commander of the Order of Osmanieh, Honorary Doctor of Laws (Glasgow University)

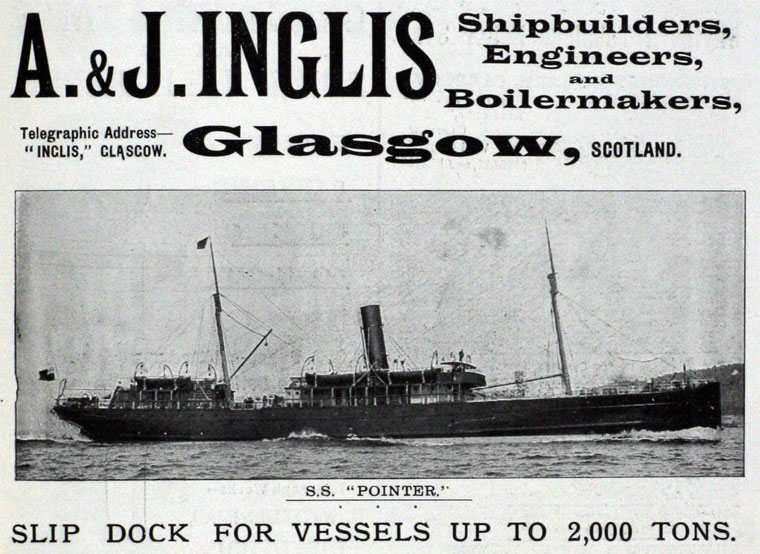
A. & J. INGLIS- Shipbuilders, Engineers and Boilermakers, Glasgow, Scotland. Telegraphic Address "INGLIS," GLASGOW. S.S. Pointer. Slip Dock for Vessels up to 2,000 Tons.

John Inglis LLD (1842 in Glasgow – 1919) was a Scottish engineer and shipbuilder who managed the well-known shipyard A. & J. Inglis in Pointhouse Glasgow, which had been set up by his father Anthony Inglis and his uncle John Inglis.

== Career ==
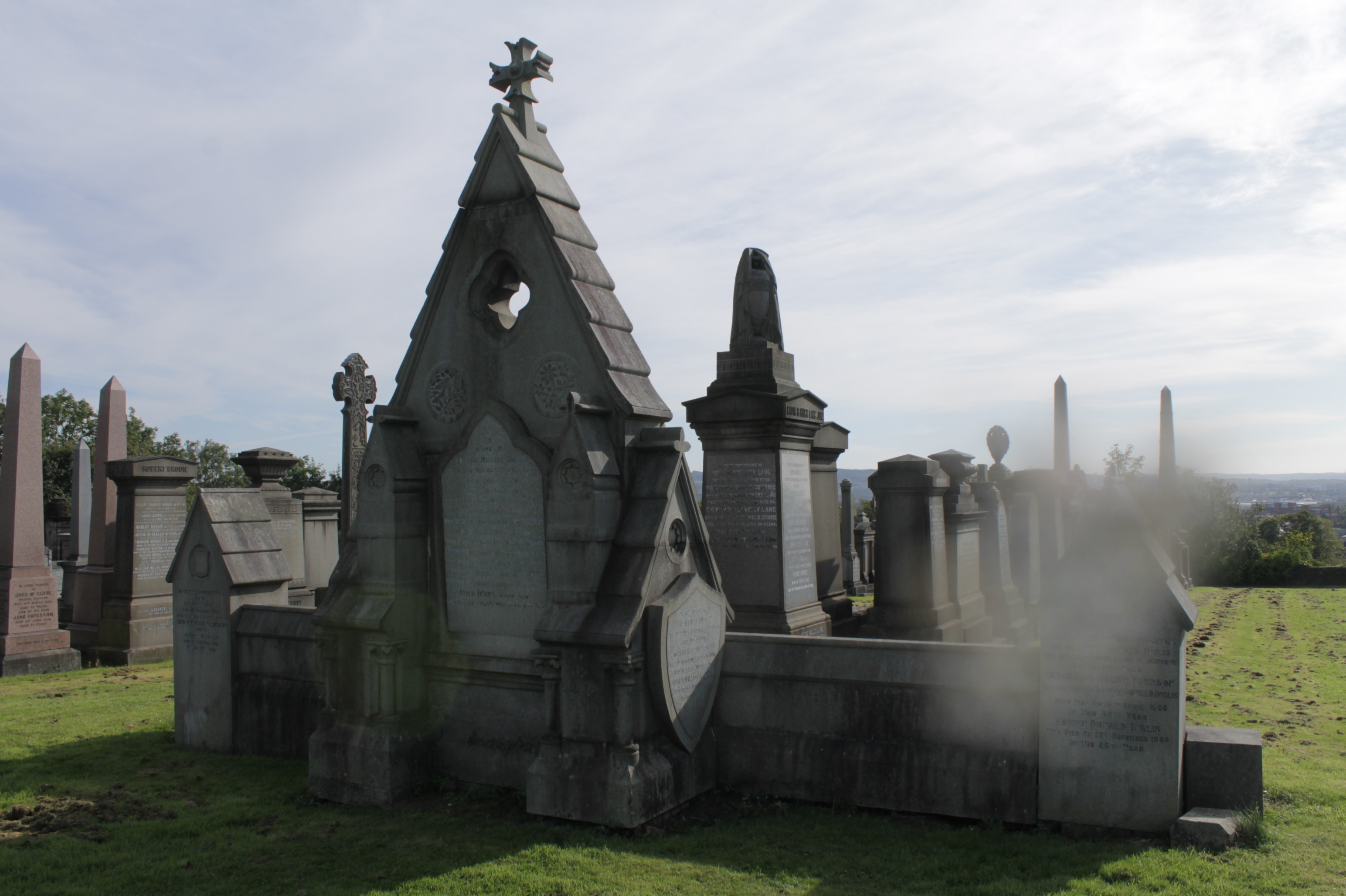
The grave of John Inglis, Glasgow Necropolis

He was brought up at 76 Clyde Street in the Anderson district of Glasgow.

John Inglis left school at the age of 14 years and entered Glasgow University where, although his objective was engineering science, he studied the Arts. He gained high distinctions in Mathematics, Natural Philosophy and Engineering Science. On completion of his academic studies he then was apprenticed as an engineer in the shipyard of his father and uncle, just like any other candidate for an engineering profession. To prepare himself for the foreseeable managing role he moved from department to department, from machine shop to drawing office, from moulding loft to building yard, and gained experience in all aspects of the business.

In 1867 he married Agnes Denny, a daughter of the famous Dumbarton shipbuilding family. In 1884 after the death of his father he took over the management of the family owned shipyard A. & J. Inglis.

He was skilled and very keen yachtsman and applied his knowledge to the company's yacht design. The yachts designed and built by A. & J. Inglis were leading the field. The shipyard became famous by building the British Royal Yacht Alexandra and the Egyptian Royal Yacht SS Safra El-Bahr and consequently the Khedive of Egypt conferred on him the award of Commander of the Order of Osmanieh.

Glasgow University gave him the honorary degree of Doctor of Laws, and the Institution of Engineers & Shipbuilders in Scotland elected him as their President in 1893. In 1900 the Institute of Marine Engineers conferred upon him the same honour. He was also selected of Lord Goschen’s Naval Boilers Committee and was a Director of the North British Railway Company along with several other honorable appointments.

In later life he lived at 4 Princes Terrace in the Dowanhill district of north-west Glasgow.

He died on 13 July 1919. He is buried in the Glasgow Necropolis. The grave lies at the north end of one of the north-south rows on the eastern side of the upper plateau.

== Family ==
He was married to Agnes Denny (d.1925). Their sons included Dr Anthony Inglis, George Alexander Inglis and James Denny Inglis.
