= Lady Rose =

Lady Rose may refer to:

- Lady Rose (guitar model), a Fender Stratocaster
- "Lady Rose" (song), a song by Mungo Jerry
- MV Lady Rose, a small coastal vessel, which operated on the coast of British Columbia, Canada
- Vivien Rose, Lady Rose of Colmworth, a justice of the Supreme Court of the United Kingdom
