= Anthony Inglis =

Anthony Inglis may refer to:

- Anthony Inglis (conductor) (born 1952), British conductor
- Anthony Inglis (shipbuilder) (1813–1884), engineer and shipbuilder
- Tony Inglis (1914–1999), art director
