= DEPV Talisman =

Clyde-built paddle steamer (1935 - 1967)

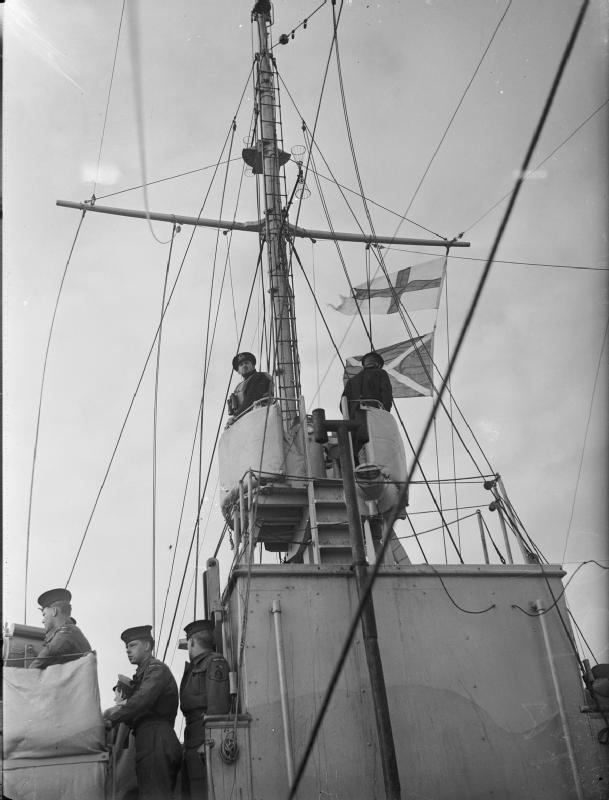
- Aboard HMS Aristocrat during the Normandy invasion, June 1944

History

United Kingdom
- Name: Talisman; Aristocrat
- Owner: London and North Eastern Railway; 1948: British Transport Commission; 1951: Caledonian Steam Packet Company
- Port of registry: Glasgow
- Route: Craigendoran to Rothesay; 1953 - 1966: Millport
- Builder: A. & J. Inglis, Pointhouse, Glasgow; Engine Builders: British Polar Engines
- Cost: £48,900
- Yard number: 956
- Launched: 10 April 1935
- In service: 1935
- Out of service: 1966
- Fate: Broken up 17 October 1967

General characteristics
- Tonnage: 544 GRT
- Length: 227 ft (69 m)
- Beam: 54 ft (16 m)
- Draught: 6 ft (1.8 m)
- Installed power: Diesel Electric
- Propulsion: Paddle
- Speed: 17 knots (31 km/h; 20 mph)
- Capacity: 1250

DEPV Talisman was the world's first diesel-electric paddle vessel. Built in 1935, she was a passenger ferry on the Clyde, seeing wartime service as HMS Aristocrat. From 1953, she served for 14 years on the Millport station.

== History ==
Talisman was the world's first diesel electric paddle vessel. Built by A. & J. Inglis in 1935 for the London and North Eastern Railway, she was a replacement for their 1896 PS Talisman. The new vessel's revolutionary engines gave considerable trouble, resulting in a sudden withdrawal at the peak of the 1939 season. After war time service, engine problems continued and, with the arrival of the diesel Maids, Talisman was withdrawn in 1953. She was reprieved and re-engined in 1954, to replace the slow PS Marchioness of Lorne on the Millport station. She continued in summer service until her withdrawal in 1966. She was sold for scrap and broken up in 1967 by W H Arnott, Young & Co at Dalmuir.

== Layout ==
Talisman had a passenger capacity of over 1250. Large deckhouses fore and aft and a single tall funnel amidships gave her an unusual appearance for a Clyde Steamer. During the refit on returning to civilian service, new deckhouses were added, providing additional shelter. Her four British Polar diesel engines powered the vessel's electricity generators that provided the power to the electric propulsions motors. Decca radar was fitted in late 1958.

== Service ==
Talisman was based at Craigendoran, sailing to Dunoon, Rothesay and the Kyles of Bute. She was requisitioned by the Admiralty as HMS Aristocrat, operating as an anti aircraft ship and in other roles, including as an HQ ship at the Normandy landings.

After her reprieve in 1953, Talisman was successfully placed on the Wemyss Bay - Largs - Millport route. Despite the noise and vibration of her engines, she became a popular vessel and served Millport for another 14 years.

== Commemoration ==
The nameplate and central feature from one of the paddleboxes is featured above the bar of the Glenisle Hotel & Bistro in Lamlash on the Isle of Arran.
