= PS Bruselas =

Argentinian ship

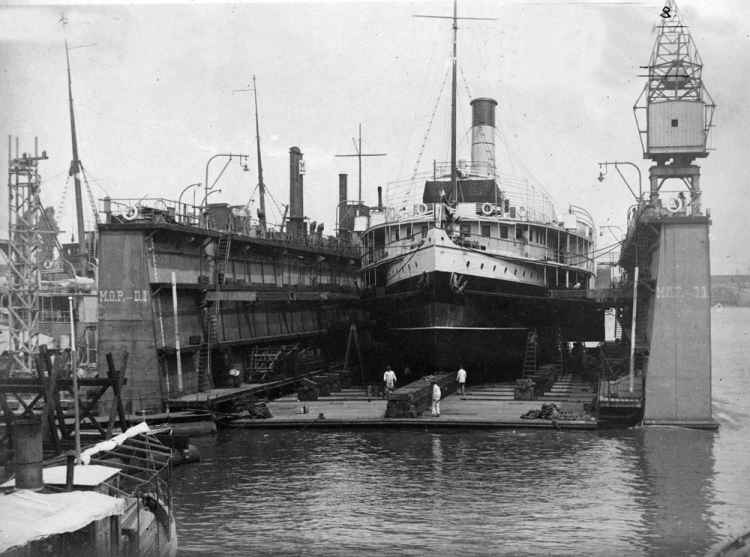
- PS Bruselas

History

Argentina
- Owner: Compañía Argentina de Navigation (Nicolás Mihanovich) Ltda, Buenos Aires
- Builder: A. & J. Inglis, Pointhouse, Glasgow, Scotland
- Yard number: 297
- Launched: 9 November 1911
- Completed: December 1911
- Fate: Scrapped in 1972 but only deleted from register in 1982

General characteristics
- Length: 273 ft 9 in (83.44 m)
- Beam: 37 ft 1 in (11.30 m)
- Draught: 8 ft 6 in (2.59 m)

PS Bruselas was built by A. & J. Inglis, Pointhouse, Glasgow, Scotland and launched in 1911 for Compañía Argentina de Navigation (Nicolás Mihanovich) Ltda, Buenos Aires.

== Ownership ==
She was owned by the Croatian entrepreneur Nicolás Mihanovich, who had established a substantial local shipping business in Argentina. However, during the First World War he experienced some unforeseen political difficulties like other Europeans who had settled overseas. Thus he formed a new company in 1909 in London, Argentine Navigation Co (Nicholas Mihanovich) Ltd, to raise capital to fund the purchase of British built river and coastal passenger steamers. As Croatia was part of the Austrian Empire and therefore at war with Britain, the 72-year-old Mihanovich, decided to sell the British company and its Argentinean subsidiaries to a group of Philipps companies. On the sales date the group of his Argentinean companies owned 71 vessels, including passenger ships, tugs and barges. The companies' main services were an overnight express route from Buenos Aires to Montevideo and a passenger service up-river to Rosario.
