= SS Waroonga (1882) =

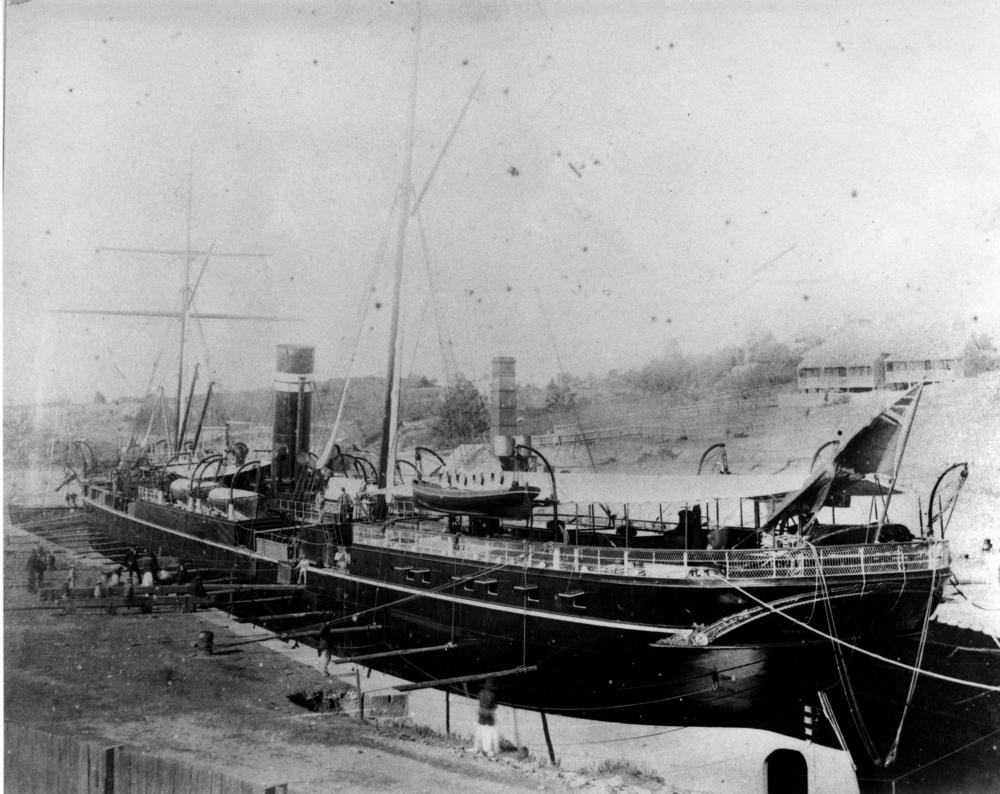
- Waroonga in dry dock in Brisbane

History
- Name: 1882: Waroonga; 1913: Bansei Maru
- Owner: 1883: Edwyn S Dawes; 1885: British India Associated Steamers; 1889: Australasian United SN Co; 1900: British India SN Co; 1913: T Yoshida; 1914: Kishimoto Kisen KK; 1915: Kishimoto Shokai Goshi Kaisha; 1917: Kusakabe Kyutaro; 1920: Kabafuto Kisen KK
- Port of registry: 1883: (United Kingdom) Glasgow; 1889: (United Kingdom) Brisbane; 1900: (United Kingdom) Glasgow; 1913: (Japan) Kobe; 1914: (Japan) Dairen; 1917: (Japan) Kobe; 1920: (Japan) Tsuruga
- Builder: A. & J. Inglis Pointhouse, Glasgow
- Yard number: 172
- Launched: 25 December 1882
- Completed: 1883
- Maiden voyage: 26 March 1883
- Identification: UK official number 86749; code letters HGQW

General characteristics
- Tonnage: 2,506 GRT, 1,614 NRT
- Length: 315.8 ft (96.3 m)
- Beam: 36.2 ft (11.0 m)
- Depth: 25.1 ft (7.7 m)
- Installed power: 317 NHP
- Propulsion: 1 × compound steam engine; 1 × screw
- Sail plan: brigantine

SS Waroonga was a steel-hulled passenger and cargo steamship that was launched in Scotland in 1882, renamed Bansei Maru in 1913 and scrapped in Japan in 1926. Her career included periods in British, Australian and Japanese ownership.

== Building ==
A. & J. Inglis built Waroonga in Glasgow for Edwyn S Dawes of Gray, Dawes & Co. Her registered length was 315.8 ft (96.3 m), her beam was 36.2 ft (11.0 m) and her depth was 25.1 ft (7.7 m). Her tonnages were 2,506 GRT and 1,614 NRT.

Waroonga was screw-propelled, with an inverted two-cylinder compound steam engine also built by A & J Inglis. The engine had a 51-inch (130 cm) stroke, its high-pressure cylinder had a 40-inch (100 cm) bore and its low-pressure cylinder had a 73-inch (190 cm) bore. It was rated at 317 NHP.

Dawes registered Waroonga in Glasgow. Her UK official number was 86749 and her code letters were HGQW.

== Maiden voyage ==
Waroonga's maiden voyage started from London on 26 March 1883. She sailed to Brisbane via Suez and Batavia. On her maiden voyage she carried Harry "Breaker" Morant to Australia.

== Changes of ownership and registry ==
In 1885 British India Associated Steamers became Waroonga's owners. In 1889 the Australasian United Steam Navigation Company bought her and registered her in Brisbane. In 1900 the British India Steam Navigation Company bought her back and registered her in Glasgow.

In 1913 bought Waroonga, renamed her Bansei Maru and registered her in Kobe. She then passed through a series of Japanese owners who registered her in various ports in Japan and Kwantung. She was scrapped in 1926.
