= SS Cheduba =

History

United Kingdom
- Name: Cheduba
- Owner: British India Steam Navigation Company Glasgow
- Builder: A. & J. Inglis, Pointhouse, Glasgow, Scotland; Archibald Denny, Dumbarton
- Yard number: 3 (Inglis); 27 (Denny)
- Launched: Wednesday, 8 April 1863
- Fate: Sunk on 15 May 1869.

General characteristics
- Type: Steamship
- Tonnage: 667 GRT
- Length: 209.1 ft (63.7 m)
- Beam: 26.3 ft (8.0 m)
- Installed power: 140 nhp
- Propulsion: 2-cylinder steam engine
- Speed: 9 knots (17 km/h; 10 mph)

The SS Cheduba was the third ship built at A and J Inglis, Pointhouse, Glasgow. She was probably built in collaboration with Archibald Denny Dumbarton and launched on Saturday, 18 April 1863.

Cheduba was owned by British India Steam Navigation Company Glasgow. She sank with the loss of all hands in the Bay of Bengal on 15 May 1869 while on passage from Calcutta to Rangoon.
