= SS Karagola =

British cargo ship that was burnt out and scrapped

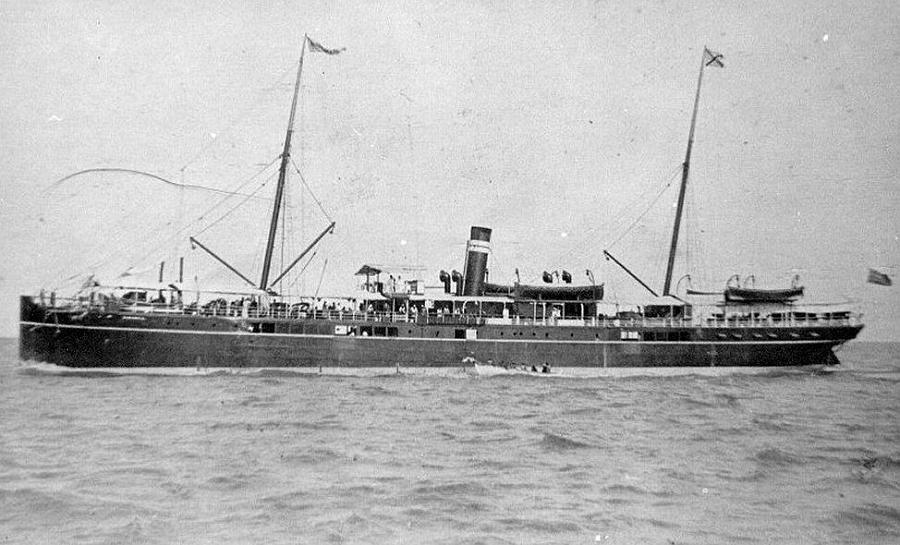
- Karagola

History

United Kingdom
- Name: Karagola
- Owner: British India SN Co
- Port of registry: Glasgow
- Builder: A. & J. Inglis, Pointhouse
- Yard number: 200
- Launched: 28 October 1887
- Completed: 15 December 1887
- Identification: UK official number 95026; code letters KPWD
- Fate: Burnt out and scrapped, 1901

General characteristics
- Class & type: "K" class cargo ship
- Tonnage: 1,168 GRT, 598 NRT
- Length: 240.3 ft (73.2 m)
- Beam: 34.2 ft (10.4 m)
- Depth: 18.1 ft (5.5 m)
- Decks: 2
- Installed power: 211 NHP, 1,797 ihp
- Propulsion: 1 × triple expansion engine; 1 × screw
- Speed: 12 knots (22 km/h)
- Capacity: passengers: 24 × 1st class, 16 × 2nd class, 1,459 × deck
- Notes: sister ships: Kapurthala, Kistna, Katoria, Kavlana, Kasara, Kola

SS Karagola was a cargo steamship of the British India Steam Navigation Company (BI). She was built in Scotland in 1887, and operated a regular cargo, passenger and mail service in Burma. In 1901 a fire damaged her beyond repair, so she was scrapped.

This was the first of two BI ships to be called Karagola. The second was a steamship that was launchdd in 1916 and scrapped in 1948.

== Building ==
Between 1887 and 1890 BI took delivery of a class of seven cargo steamships from shipyards in the west of Scotland. William Denny and Brothers at Dumbarton built Kapurthala, Katoria, and Kavlana. A. & J. Inglis at Pointhouse in Glasgow built Karagola and Kola. Ailsa Shipbuilding Company at Troon built Kistna and Kasara. BI allocated them to different regular Indian Ocean routes, on which they carried cargo, mail, and deck passengers.

Inglis built Karagola as yard number 200. She was launched on 28 October 1887 and completed on 15 December that year. Her registered length was 240.3 ft (73.2 m), her beam was 34.2 ft (10.4 m) and her depth was 18.1 ft (5.5 m). Her tonnages were 1,168 GRT and 598 NRT. She had berths for 24 first class and 16 second class passengers, and was licensed to carry 1,459 passengers on deck.

Karagola had a single screw, driven by a three-cylinder triple expansion engine built by Inglis. It was rated at 211 NHP or 1,797 ihp, and gave her a speed of 12 knots (22 km/h).

== Career ==
BI registered Karagola at Glasgow. Her United Kingdom official number was 95026 and her code letters were KPWD. Her regular route was a mail service along the coast of Arakan to Akyab (now Sittwe).

On 20 April 1901 Karagola was in Akyab with a cargo of rice and casks of oil when she caught fire. She was scuttled to quench the fire, and later raised. However, an evaluation determined that it would cost more money to fix the structural damage than the ship was worth, and she was subsequently scrapped.

== Fate of sister ships ==
In 1914 BI sold Kola to Chinese buyers, who scrapped her. The other five ships of the class all survived the First World War. Kistna and Kavlana were scrapped in 1920; Kapurthala, Katoria, and Kasara were scrapped in 1923.

== Bibliography ==
- Haws, Duncan (1987). British India S.N. Co. Merchant Fleets. Vol. 11. Burwash: Travel Creatours Ltd Publications. ISBN 0-946378-07-X.
- Lloyd's Register of British and Foreign Shipping. Vol. I.–Steamers. London: Lloyd's Register of Shipping. 1899 – via Internet Archive.
- Mercantile Navy List. London. 1889 – via Crew List Index Project.
