= MV Anonity =

Coastal tanker built in 1945

History
- Name: Empire Campden (1945-47); Anonity (1947-66); Petrola II (1966-69); Kalymnos (1969-70)
- Owner: Ministry of War Transport (1945-47); F T Everard Ltd (1947-66); John S Lastis (1966-69); P C Chrissochoides (1969-70)
- Operator: Anglo-Saxon Petroleum Co Ltd (1945-47); F T Everard Ltd (1947-66); John S Lastis (1966-69); P C Chrissochoides (1969-70)
- Port of registry: (United Kingdom) Glasgow (1945-47); (United Kingdom) London (1947-66); (Greece) Piraeus (1966-70)
- Builder: A. & J. Inglis Ltd
- Yard number: 1300
- Launched: 30 April 1945
- Completed: August 1945
- Identification: Code Letters GKKG (1945-66); United Kingdom Official Number 169447 (1945-66)
- Fate: Ran aground and subsequently scrapped, 1970.

General characteristics
- Tonnage: 890 GRT; 379 NRT; 900 DWT
- Length: 193 ft 0 in (58.83 m)
- Beam: 32 ft 0 in (9.75 m)
- Depth: 14 ft 5 in (4.39 m)
- Installed power: 1 x 2SCSA diesel engine
- Propulsion: Screw propeller
- Speed: 9 knots (17 km/h)

Anonity was an 890 GRT coastal tanker which was built in 1945 for the Ministry of War Transport (MoWT) as Empire Campden. She was sold in 1947 and renamed Anonity. In 1966, she was sold and renamed Petrola II. A further sale in 1969 saw her renamed Kalymnos. She ran aground in April 1970 and was scrapped the following month.

== Description ==
The ship was built by A& J Inglis Ltd, Glasgow as yard number 1300. She was launched on 30 April 1945 and completed in August 1945.

The ship was 193 feet 0 inches (58.83 m) long, with a beam of 32 feet 0 inches (9.75 m) and a depth of 14 feet 5 inches (4.39 m). Her GRT was 890 and she had a NRT of 379. Her DWT was 900.

She was propelled by a 2-stroke Single Cycle Single Action diesel engine which had four cylinders of 13 3/8 inches (34 cm) diameter by 27 7/16 inches (69.7 cm) stroke. The engine was built by British Polar Engines Ltd, Glasgow. It could propel her at 9 knots (17 km/h).

== History ==
Empire Campden was built for the MoWT. She was placed under the management of the Anglo-Saxon Petroleum Co Ltd. Her port of registry was Glasgow. The Code Letters GFFG were allocated. Her Official Number was 169447.

In 1947, Empire Campden was sold to F T Everard & Co Ltd and renamed Anonity. Her port of registry was changed to London. She served with Everard's until 1966 when she was sold to John S Lastis, Greece and renamed Petrola II. In 1969, she was sold to P C Chrissochoides and renamed Kalymnos. Her port of registry was changed to Piraeus. On 12 April 1970, she ran aground off Rhodes and was declared a constructive total loss. Kalymnos was refloated and towed to Piraeus. She was sold on 25 May 1970 to D. Vittiotis & Salmina, Piraeus for scrap.
