= SS Sirsa =

British steamship that traded around the Indian coast

History

United Kingdom
- Name: Sirsa
- Namesake: Sirsa
- Owner: British India SN Co
- Port of registry: Glasgow
- Route: Indian coastal routes
- Builder: A. & J. Inglis, Glasgow
- Yard number: 177
- Launched: 19 October 1883
- Completed: December 1883
- Maiden voyage: 31 December 1883
- Out of service: laid up 1906
- Identification: UK official number 87726; code letters JCGS
- Fate: Scrapped 1908

General characteristics
- Type: cargo liner
- Tonnage: 2,351 GRT, 1,691 NRT
- Length: 310.0 ft (94.5 m)
- Beam: 39.2 ft (11.9 m)
- Depth: 25.0 ft (7.6 m)
- Decks: 3
- Installed power: 180 NHP
- Propulsion: 1 × 2-cylinder compound engine; 1 × screw
- Sail plan: 3-masted barquentine
- Speed: 10 knots (19 km/h)
- Capacity: 48 passengers
- Notes: sister ships: Sirdhana, Scindia, Secundra

SS Sirsa was a steel-hulled merchant steamship that was built in Scotland in 1883 and scrapped in Bombay (now Mumbai) in 1908. She spent her entire career with the British India Steam Navigation Company (BI).

She was the first of three BI ships to be named after the city of Sirsa in India. The second was a steamship that was built in 1920, sold in 1951, and scrapped in 1960. The third was a motor ship that was built in 1950 and scrapped in 1971.

== Building ==
In 1879 William Denny and Brothers of Dumbarton built for BI Sirdhana and Scindia, a pair of sister ships. In 1883 A. & J. Inglis of Glasgow built a second pair of ships for BI, Secundra and Sirsa, to the same design.

Sirsa was the last of the four to be built. Inglis built her at Pointhouse as yard number 177. She was launched on 19 October 1883 and completed that December. Her registered length was 310.0 ft (94.5 m), her beam was 39.2 ft (11.9 m) and her depth was 25.0 ft (7.6 m). Her tonnages were 2,351 GRT and 1,691 NRT. She had berths for 48 passengers.

Sirsa had a single screw, driven by a two-cylinder compound engine. It was rated at 180 NHP, and gave her a speed of 10 knots (19 km/h). She also had three masts for sailing, and was rigged as a barquentine.

BI registered the ship in Glasgow. Her UK official number 87726 was and her code letters were JCGS.

== Career ==
Sirsa's maiden voyage was to Brisbane, leaving Britain on 31 December 1883. Thereafter she worked coastal routes around India.

All BI ships were designed to be converted into troop ships, by putting troop accommodation in the holds. In the Second Boer War the UK Government chartered at least 37 BI ships for war service. On 20 September 1899 in Bombay she embarked part of the Second Battalion of the Gordon Highlanders. She reached Durban on 9 October. She also made a trooping voyage in 1900.

Sirsa was laid up in 1906. She was scrapped in Bombay in September 1908.

== Bibliography ==
- Haws, Duncan (1987). British India S.N. Co. Merchant Fleets. Vol. 11. Burwash: Travel Creatours Ltd Publications. ISBN 0-946378-07-X.
- Lloyd's Register of British and Foreign Shipping. London: Lloyd's Register of Shipping. 1884 – via Internet Archive.
- Mercantile Navy List. London. 1884 – via Crew List Index Project.
