= MV Aqueity (1945) =

History
- Name: Empire Belgrave (1945-47); Aqueity (1947)
- Owner: Ministry of War Transport (1945-47); Shell Tankers Ltd (1947); F T Everard (1947)
- Operator: Anglo-Saxon Petroleum Co Ltd (1945-47); F T Everard (1947)
- Port of registry: (United Kingdom) Glasgow
- Builder: A. & J. Inglis Ltd, Glasgow
- Yard number: 1299
- Launched: 16 March 1945
- Completed: 19 June 1945
- Out of service: 11 November 1947
- Identification: UK Official Number 169440; Code Letters GKJW
- Fate: Struck a mine and sank 1947

General characteristics
- Tonnage: 890 GRT; 900 DWT; 382 NRT
- Length: 193 ft (58.83 m)
- Beam: 32 ft (9.75 m)
- Depth: 14 ft 5 in (4.39 m)
- Propulsion: One 2SCSA oil engine, 125 hp (93 kW)

Aqueity was an 890 GRT coastal tanker which was built by A & J Inglis Ltd, Glasgow in 1945 for the Ministry of War Transport (MoWT) as Empire Belgrave. In 1947 she was sold to F T Everard and Sons and renamed Aqueity, being lost later that year when she struck a mine and sank off the coast of the Netherlands.

== Description ==
Empire Belgrave was built by A. & J. Inglis Ltd, Glasgow. She was yard number 1299. Empire Belgrave was launched on 16 March 1945 and completed on 19 June. She was 193 feet (58.83 m) long, with a beam of 32 feet (9.75 m) and a depth of 14 feet 5 inches (4.39 m). Her GRT was 890, DWT 900 with a NRT of 382.

== Career ==
Empire Belgrave was managed for the MoWT by the Anglo-Saxon Petroleum Co Ltd. Postwar management passed to Shell Tankers. In 1947, Empire Belgrave was sold to F T Everard & Sons Ltd, Greenhithe and renamed Aqueity. On 11 November 1947, she struck a mine off Terschelling, the Netherlands and sank. The wreck lies in 22 metres (72 ft) of water at 53°32′N 05°02′E.

== Official Numbers and Code Letters ==
Official Numbers were a forerunner to IMO Numbers. The ship had the UK Official Number 169440 and the Code Letters GKJW.

== Propulsion ==
The ship was propelled by a two-stroke Single Cycle, Single Action diesel engine which had four cylinders of 13 3/4 inches (350 mm) diameter by 22 7/16 inches (570 mm) stroke. It was built by British Polar Engines Ltd, Glasgow.
