= SS Tavolara (1910) =

History
- Owner: 1910 Ferrovie dello Stato, Civitavecchia; 1926 Cia Sardia di Armamento e Navigazione, Genoa; 1937 'Tirrenia' SA di Nav; 1940 Italian Navy requisition; 1943 Seized by Germany 9/1943, Kriegsmarine hospital ship; 1946 'Tirrenia' SA di Nav., Genoa
- Builder: A. & J. Inglis, Pointhouse, Glasgow, Scotland
- Yard number: 292
- Launched: 10 March 1910
- Fate: Sunk by air attack on 10 June 1944, raised and repaired. Scrapped at Palermo

General characteristics
- Type: Passenger ship
- Length: 153.9 feet (BP)
- Beam: 26.6 feet
- Installed power: Steam, triple expansion
- Propulsion: Single screw
- Speed: 12 knots

The Italian passenger liner SS Tavolara was built in May 1910. It was renamed in 1910 as Terra Nova and in 1928 as Limbara. The ship was rebuilt during World War II and on 1 February 1944 commissioned as the German hospital ship Innsbruck. It was used for 84 patients. The ship was sunk during an air raid on 9–10 June 1944 at the pier in Trieste.
