= MV Clyde =

History

United Kingdom
- Owner: Clyde Navigation Trust
- Builder: A & J Inglis, Pointhouse, Glasgow, Scotland
- Yard number: 1643P
- Launched: 14 December 1960

General characteristics
- Type: Tug & Inspection Launch
- Tonnage: 65 grt, 26 nrt
- Length: 69.1/75 feet
- Beam: 16.6 feet
- Installed power: 152bhp
- Propulsion: Twin L Gardner & Sons diesel 2 x 8 cylinders, 2 screws
- Speed: 10kn

MV Clyde was a motor vessel built at A & J Inglis in Pointhouse, Glasgow, and equipped with engines by L Gardner & Sons, Manchester. She was used for inspections and conveyance of trustees of the Clyde Navigation Trust (now Clydeport) on special occasions. Sometimes she was used for special excursions.

From 1984 to 1992, she was used by Invicta Line Cruises of Chatham for services between Southend and Strood. The company folded, and she was sold in 1992. She now belongs to Marine Service, a maintenance company based in Las Palmas, the Canary Islands, to carry out underwater work on other ships and platforms.
