= SS Blanche =

History

United Kingdom
- Name: SS Blanche
- Owner: 1863 H L Seligmann, Glasgow; 1864 M Langlands & Sons, Glasgow; 18xx (foreign); 1872 Joseph Weatherley, John Mead & Edward Hussey, London; 1889 Furness Withy.; 1892 Osborn & Wallis
- Builder: A. & J. Inglis, Pointhouse, Glasgow, Scotland
- Yard number: 1
- Launched: 8 April 1863
- Fate: Wrecked 15 July 1901

General characteristics
- Type: Iron steamship – collier
- Tonnage: 246grt (1872: 234grt, 145net)
- Length: 121 feet (1872: 146.1 feet)
- Beam: 20 feet (1872: 20.1 feet)
- Draught: (Depth) 12 feet (1872: 12.0 feet)
- Propulsion: Steam

SS Blanche was the first ship built by A and J Inglis at Pointhouse, Glasgow as Yard No.1 and launched on 8 April 1863. She was a cargo steamer and entered service in May 1863 with Glasgow shipowner, Hermann L Seligmann on his Glasgow-Dunkirk service. Seligmann sold Blanche in 1864 to Mathew Langlands of M Langlands & Sons, Glasgow, and in 1867 she was resold to London-based Joseph Weatherley. In 1888 the ship was purchased by Christopher Furness of West Hartlepool, who employed her as a coastal collier. Furness' shipping business was incorporated in October 1891 as Furness, Withy & Company Ltd but, before formal transfer of her ownership, Blanche was sold to Osborn & Wallis of Bristol.

Blanche was wrecked on 15 July 1901 on Île-Tudy on her passage from Cardiff to Quimper, Brittany, with a cargo of bran.
