= SS Hankow =

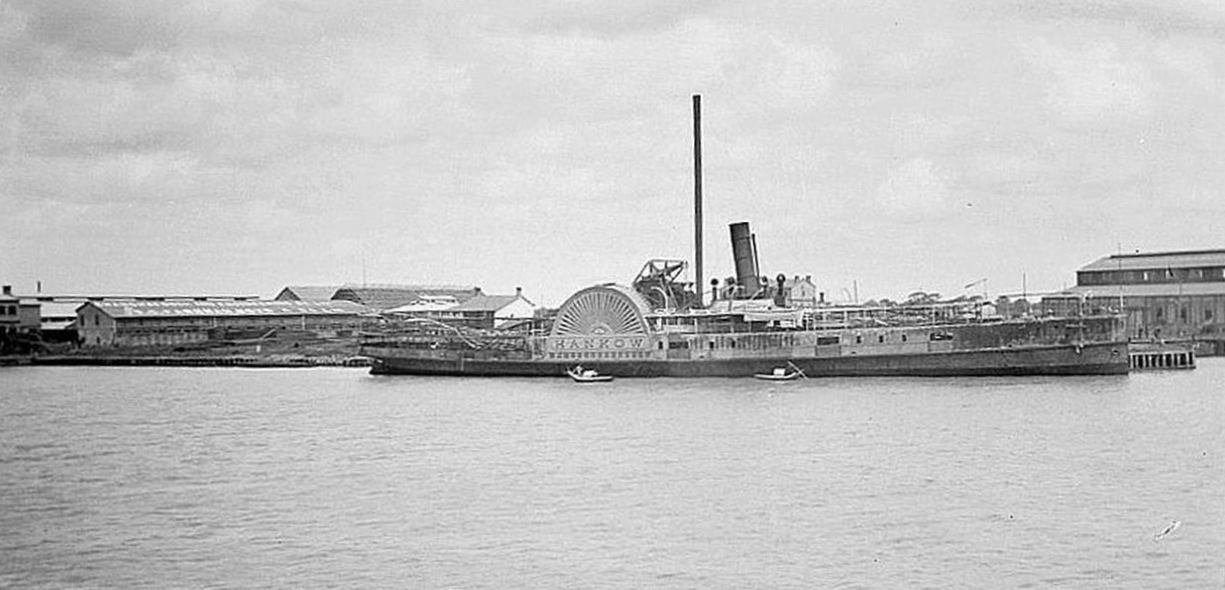
- The paddle steamer SS Hankow was built in 1874 in Glasgow for the China Navigation Company

History

United Kingdom
- Name: Hankow
- Owner: China Navigation Co, London
- Route: Yangtze and from 1886 Hong Kong/Canton service
- Builder: A. & J. Inglis, Pointhouse, Glasgow, Scotland
- Yard number: 107
- Launched: 30 December 1873
- Fate: Destroyed by American bombing during WW2

General characteristics
- Type: Iron Paddle Steamer
- Tonnage: 3073 grt
- Length: 308.5ft
- Beam: 42.3ft
- Draught: 15.2ft depth
- Installed power: 140nhp
- Propulsion: Steam 2cyl
- Speed: 9 knots

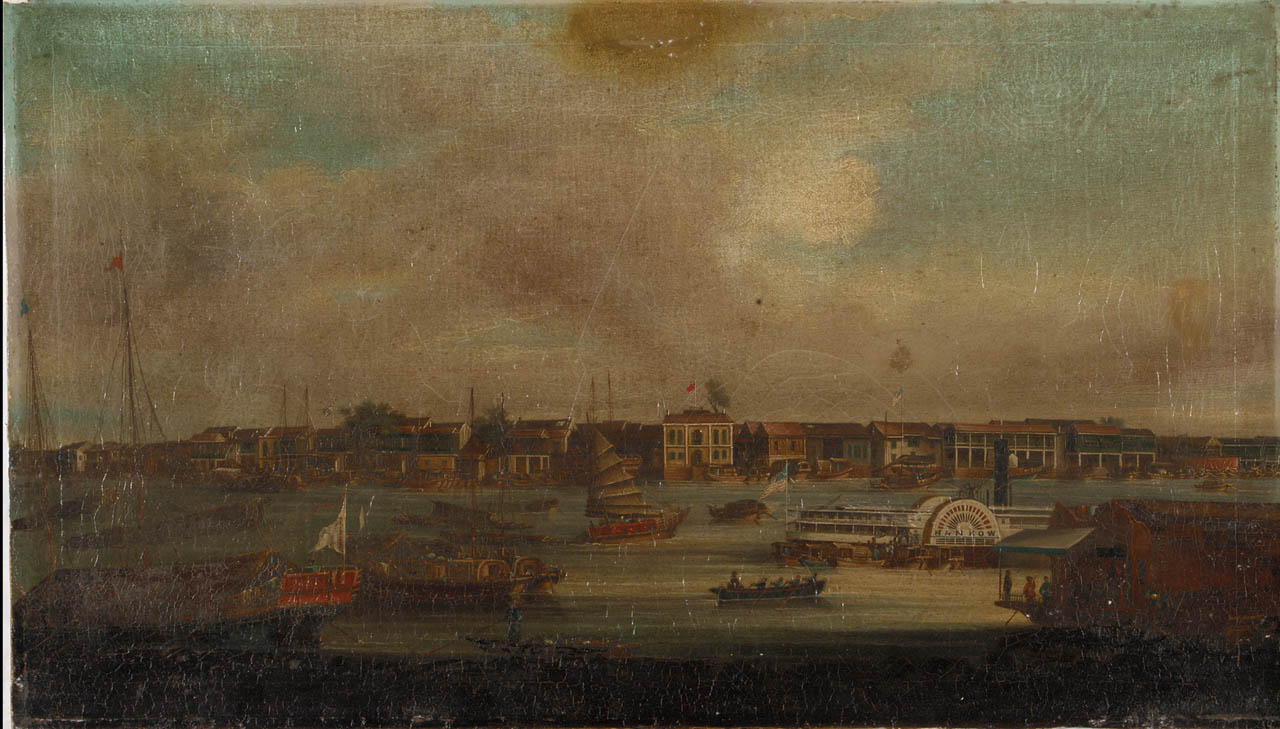
The American steamship Hankow at Hankow

The SS Hankow was an iron paddle steamer built at A and J Inglis, Pointhouse, Glasgow with Yard No. 107. She was transferred from Yangtze to Hong Kong/Canton service in 1886 . it was gutted by fire on 14 October 1906 at Canton Steamer Wharf, Hong Kong, with loss of 130 lives. It was towed to Shanghai in 1907 and converted to hulk and moved to Hankou as transhipment godown. It was then transferred to Shasi in 1930, and to Yichang in 1938. It was destroyed by American bombing during World War II.

It measured 308.5 feet in length, with a beam of 42.3 feet and a depth of 15.2 feet, and had a gross tonnage of 3,073 tons.

== 1906 fire ==
On 14 October 1906, at around 3 am, Hankow arrived in Hong Kong from Canton carrying cargo and about 2,000 Chinese passengers. At the time, the vessel was owned by Messrs. Butterfield & Swire, the managing firm of the China Navigation Company, and was moored at the wharf in Sheung Wan.

At around 3:10 am, a fire suddenly broke out in the stern of Hankow. The chief officer, Mr. H.W. Holmes, immediately alerted Captain B. Branch, who rushed to the engine room and instructed chief engineer, Mr. James Christie, to start the fire hose. However, the instructions cannot be carried out as the rising temperature was impossible to withstand. External efforts were made to contain the blaze, with HMS Flora and personnel from the Naval Yard joining the rescue and firefighting efforts. The fire was eventually brought under control at 6 am. By then, much of the vessel had been destroyed.

At least eighty-five people were killed in the fire, while another 45 drowned, bringing the total death toll to 130. The Hongkong Telegraph remarked that even though Hong Kong had been struck by typhoons or other sadness, but nothing come close to this tragedy. In addition to the loss of life, the cargo carried 560 bales of raw milk, 400 bales of waste silk, 3,700 rolls of mattings, along with other miscellaneous cargo of unknown value. Of the cargo, 200 bales of waste silk were recovered, although they had been damaged by water. The lost cargo was estimated to worth over a million dollar.

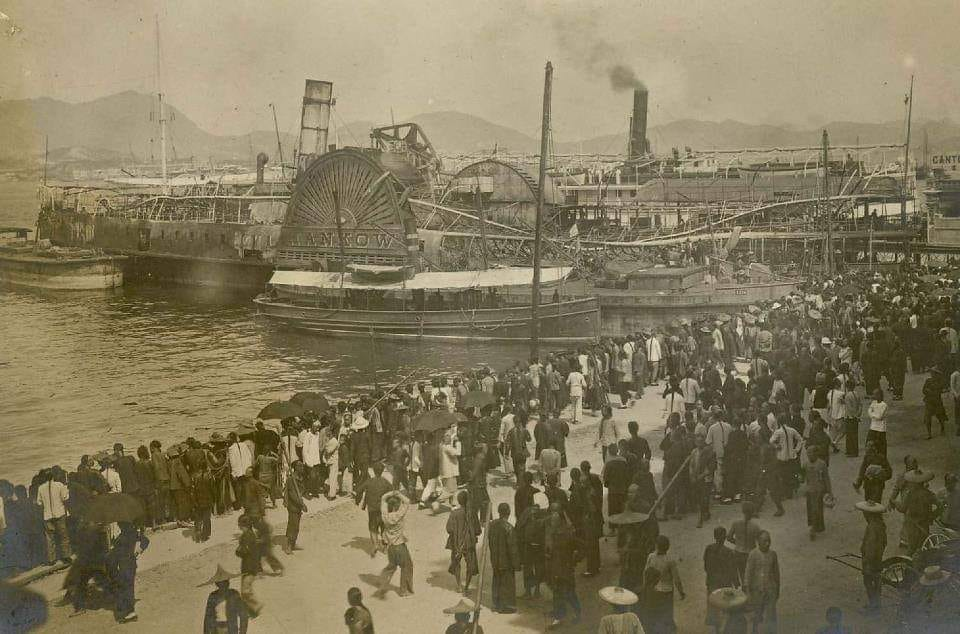
Hankow after the fire
