= SS Camorta =

British steamship that sank in the Bay of Bengal

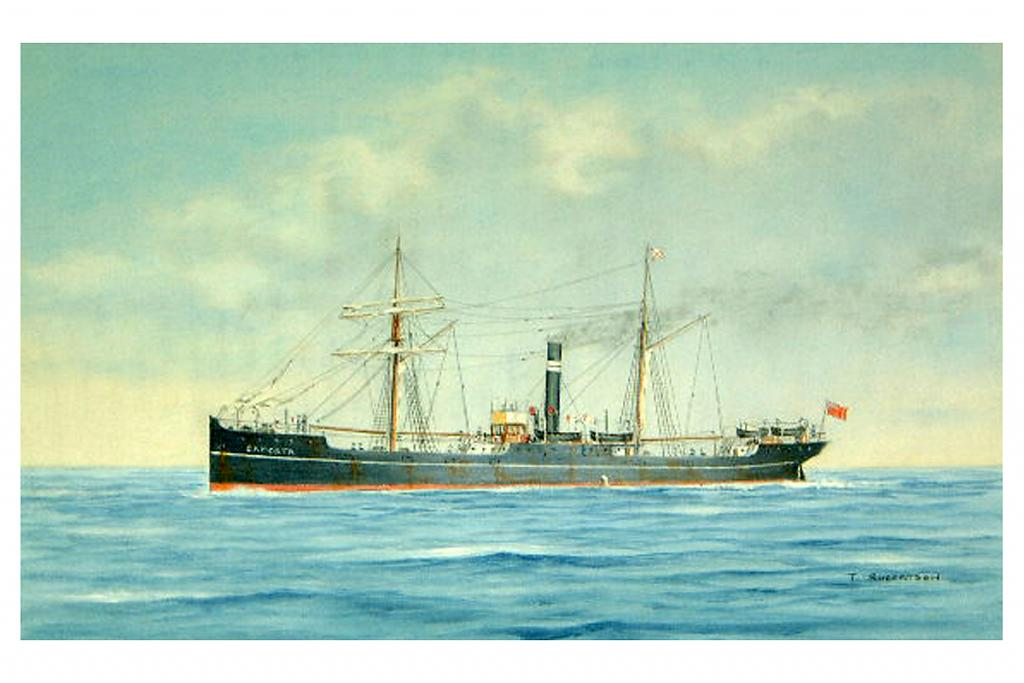
- A painting of Camorta by Tom Robinson

History
- Name: Camorta
- Namesake: Kamorta Island
- Owner: 1880: A Gray & ES Dawes; 1883: Nederlandsch Indische SM; 1886: FH Bell; 1887: ES Dawes & GS MacKenzie; 1891: RH Evans; 1892: British India SN Co
- Operator: 1880: British India SN Co; 1883: Nederlandsch Indische SM; 1886: British India SN Co; 1891: British India SN Co
- Port of registry: 1880: (United Kingdom) Glasgow; 1883: (Netherlands) Batavia; 1886: (United Kingdom) Hong Kong; 1887: (United Kingdom) Glasgow; 1891: (United Kingdom) Glasgow
- Builder: A. & J. Inglis, Glasgow
- Yard number: 160
- Launched: 16 November 1880
- Completed: 25 January 1881
- Identification: UK official number 84285; 1881: code letters VFMK; 1886: code letters SKJW
- Fate: Sank in cyclone, 6 May 1902

General characteristics
- Type: cargo liner
- Tonnage: 2,094 GRT, 1,352 NRT, 2,790 DWT
- Length: 285.2 ft (86.9 m)
- Beam: 35.2 ft (10.7 m)
- Depth: 24.1 ft (7.3 m)
- Decks: 3
- Installed power: 200 NHP
- Propulsion: 1 × 2-cylinder compound engine; 1 × screw
- Sail plan: 2-masted brigantine
- Speed: 10 knots (19 km/h)
- Capacity: at least 650 passengers: 20 × 1st class, 10 × 2nd class, & the rest deck class
- Crew: 89
- Notes: sister ship: Compta

SS Camorta was an iron-hulled passenger steamship that was built in Scotland in 1880, and lost with all hands in the Irrawaddy Delta in 1902. The disaster killed more than 700 people.

In her 21-year career Camorta had a succession of different owners. However, all of her owners and operators were owned or controlled by the British India Steam Navigation Company (BI).

== Building ==
In 1880 and 1881 A. & J. Inglis of Pointhouse, Glasgow, built a pair of ships for BI. Camorta was built as yard number 160, launched on 16 November 1880, and completed 25 January 1881. Her sister ship Compta was built as yard number 161, launched on 2 February 1881, and completed on 4 March.

Camorta's registered length was 285.2 ft (86.9 m), her beam was 35.2 ft (10.7 m) and her depth was 24.1 ft (7.3 m). Her tonnages were 2,094 GRT, 1,352 NRT, and 2,790 DWT. She had a single screw, driven by a two-cylinder compound engine. It was rated at 200 NHP and gave her a speed of 10 knots (19 km/h). She had two masts, and was rigged as a brigantine.

== Career ==
Camorta's original owners were Archibald Gray and Edwyn Dawes, who were BI's London agents. She was registered in London. Her official number was 84285 and her code letters were VFMK. Her maiden voyage was on the British India Associated Services (BIAS) route from the UK to Brisbane via the Suez Canal and Torres Strait, which BIAS had launched in 1881 with a subsidy from the Queensland Government.

In 1883 BI transferred Camorta and Compta to its Nederlandsch-Indische Stoomvaart-Maatschappij (NISM, meaning "Dutch Indies Steamship Company") subsidiary, which it had founded in 1866 to operate a mail contract for the Netherlands Government. The government contract required all ships on this service to be Dutch-registered. NISM therefore registered Camorta and Compta in Batavia.

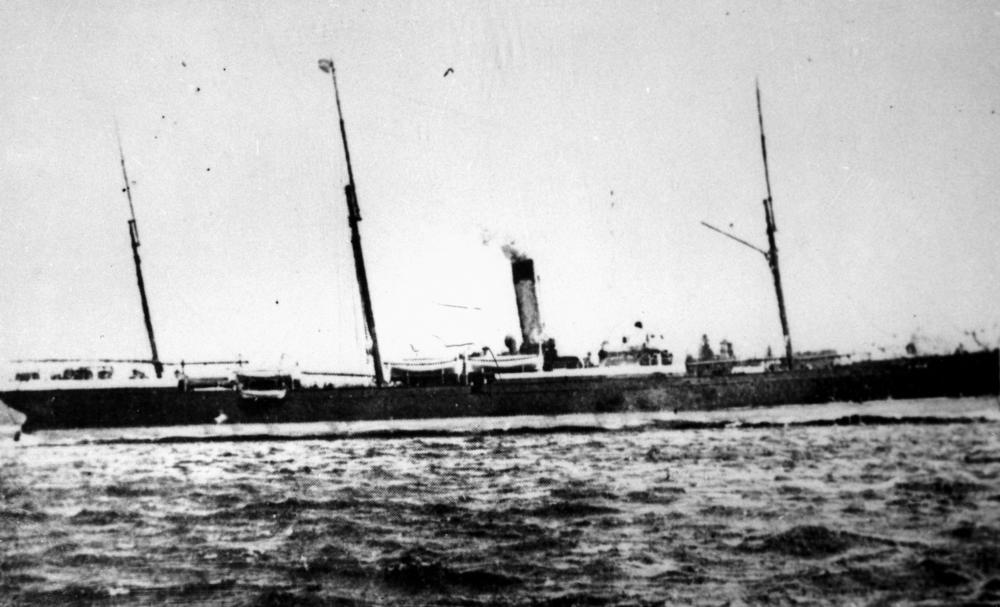
Glenfruin, which Camorta rammed and almost sank in 1885

On 17 October 1885 Camorta collided with the Glen Line cargo ship Glenfruin in Victoria Harbour, Hong Kong. Glenfruin was run aground to prevent her from sinking. Camorta's bow was also damaged. The Vice-Admiralty Court of Hong Kong seized Camorta to meet the cost of damage to Glenfruin, and on 17 April 1886 advertised Camorta for sale. Camorta was put up for public auction on Saturday, 8 May 1886 at 11:00 a.m, and Frederick Bell of Shanghai became her principal owner. She was registered in Hong Kong, and her code letters were SKJW.

Camorta returned to BI control with Edwyn Dawes and GS MacKenzie as her principal owners. In 1886 BI transferred her to its route between Nagatapam in India and Singapore. In 1887 she was registered in Glasgow. In 1891 Richard Evans became her principal owner. From 1892 BI owned her directly.

== Loss ==
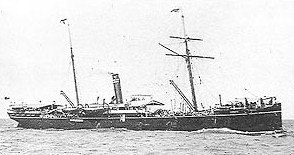
Camorta

In May 1902 Camorta was sailing from Madras (now Chennai) in India to Rangoon (now Yangon) in Burma. On 6 May a cyclone sank her with all hands between the Krishna Lightvessel and the Alguada reef when she was crossing the Baragua Flats in the Gulf of Martaban. Sources variously number the dead as 655 passengers and 82 crew; 650 passengers and 89 crew; or 781 total. A week after her loss, one of her lifeboats was found adrift at sea at position 15°30′N 96°0′E. On 3 June her wreck was found in water 15 fathoms (90 ft; 27 m) deep.

== Bibliography ==
- Haws, Duncan (1987). British India S.N. Co. Merchant Fleets. Vol. 11. Burwash: Travel Creatours Ltd Publications. ISBN 0-946378-07-X.
- Mercantile Navy List. London. 1882 – via Crew List Index Project.
- Mercantile Navy List. London. 1887 – via Crew List Index Project.
- Mercantile Navy List. London. 1888 – via Crew List Index Project.
- Mercantile Navy List. London. 1891 – via Crew List Index Project.
- Mercantile Navy List. London. 1892 – via Crew List Index Project.
- Universal Register. London: Lloyd's Register of British and Foreign Shipping. 1886 – via Internet Archive.
