= Norman Court =

British clipper

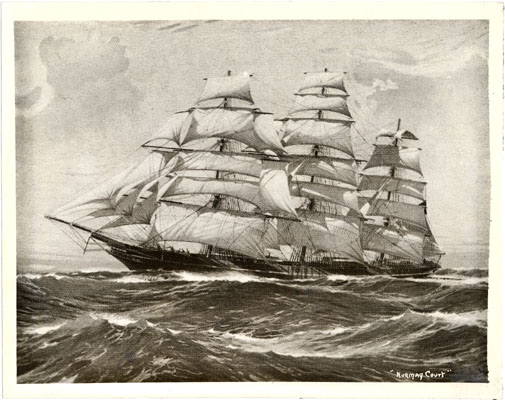
- Norman Court

History

United Kingdom
- Builder: A. & J. Inglis
- Cost: £16,005
- Launched: 1869
- Out of service: 1883
- Fate: Sunk; carcass remains in Cymyran Bay

General characteristics
- Class & type: Tea Clipper
- Tonnage: 855.02 GRT; 833.87 NRT
- Length: Hull 197.4 ft 0 in (60.17 m)
- Beam: 33 ft 0 in (10.06 m)
- Depth: 20 ft 0 in (6.10 m)
- Propulsion: Sails
- Sail plan: fully rigged ship; re-rigged 1877 as barque
- Notes: designed by William Rennie

Norman Court was a composite built clipper ship, designed by William Rennie, measuring 197.4 ft x 33 ft x 20 ft, of 833.87 tons net. The ship was built in 1869 by A. & J. Inglis of Glasgow. On the night of 29 March 1883 in a strong gale she was driven ashore and wrecked in Cymyran Bay, between Rhoscolyn and Rhosneigr, Anglesey. All bar two of the crew were saved by lifeboats from nearby Holyhead. Andrew Shewan was captain of the Norman Court from her launch until he retired in ill-health in 1873, following an extraordinarily difficult passage from China. His son, also Andrew Shewan, who had previously sailed as first mate, became captain. It was this son Andrew Shewan who recounted many tales of the ship and of the clipper ships in his book Great Days Of Sail: Reminiscences of a Tea Clipper Captain, published in 1926 when he could plausibly claim to be the last surviving tea clipper captain. He died in December 1927.

Norman Court
