= PS Weeroona =

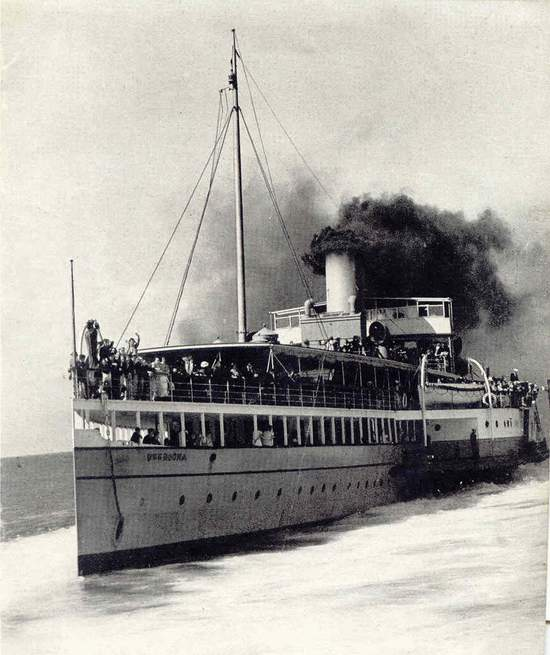
- The paddle steamer PS Weeroona

History

Australia
- Owner: Huddart Parker Ltd, Melbourne
- Operator: Huddart Parker Ltd, Melbourne; Bay Steamers Ltd, Melbourne; 1942 US Army; 1945 Australian Government
- Port of registry: Australia
- Builder: A. & J. Inglis, Pointhouse, Glasgow, Scotland
- Yard number: 290
- Launched: 8 June 1910
- Homeport: Melbourne
- Identification: 120766
- Fate: Scrapped in 1951

General characteristics
- Tonnage: 1,412 GRT
- Length: 310 feet 6 inches (94.6 m)
- Beam: 36 feet 2 inches (11.0 m)
- Draft: 12 feet 0 inches (3.7 m)
- Installed power: 517nhp
- Propulsion: Paddle Steamer

The paddle steamer PS Weeroona was built by A. & J. Inglis, Pointhouse, Glasgow, Scotland and launched in 1910. It was initially owned by Huddart Parker Ltd, Melbourne. During World War II, the ship was requisitioned for wartime service and used by the United States Army as a barracks and quarters ship through the war.

== Excursion service ==
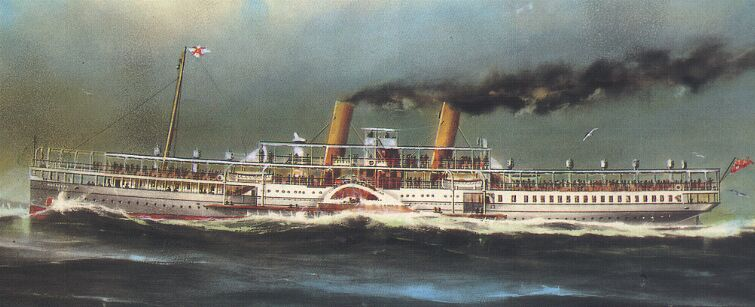
PS Weeroona

Weeroona was one of several Port Phillip Bay excursion steamers operating out of Melbourne for day trips, excursions and picnicking to destinations such as Portarlington, Queenscliff and Sorrento. The excursion vessel was equipped as a luxury excursion ship capable of carrying 1,900 passengers.

During the 1925 visit of the American fleet, the ship was involved in an incident described as "a gratuitous insult to the Prime Minister" when the ship's firemen went on strike with Commonwealth Ministers and a thousand guests, including foreign consuls and military officers, aboard. The strike was in protest at comments made by the Prime Minister and demanded he depart the ship, although he was actually not aboard. The firemen demanded a bond of £100 that he was not aboard, which was rejected, and the trip was cancelled.

By 1932, the newer Weeroona was the only one of the line remaining in service due to increased land transport. Weeroona was purchased for war service on 17 March 1942.

An article of 1 November 1943, noting the steamer might not resume excursion service after the war, mentioned that the company, Bay Steamers, was in liquidation and that the ship operated thirty-three years without a collision, that four of her captains had retired and died and that she had made 2,774 voyages, travelled 206,990 miles (333,120 km) and carried 3,030,508 passengers in that service.

== U.S. Army World War II service ==
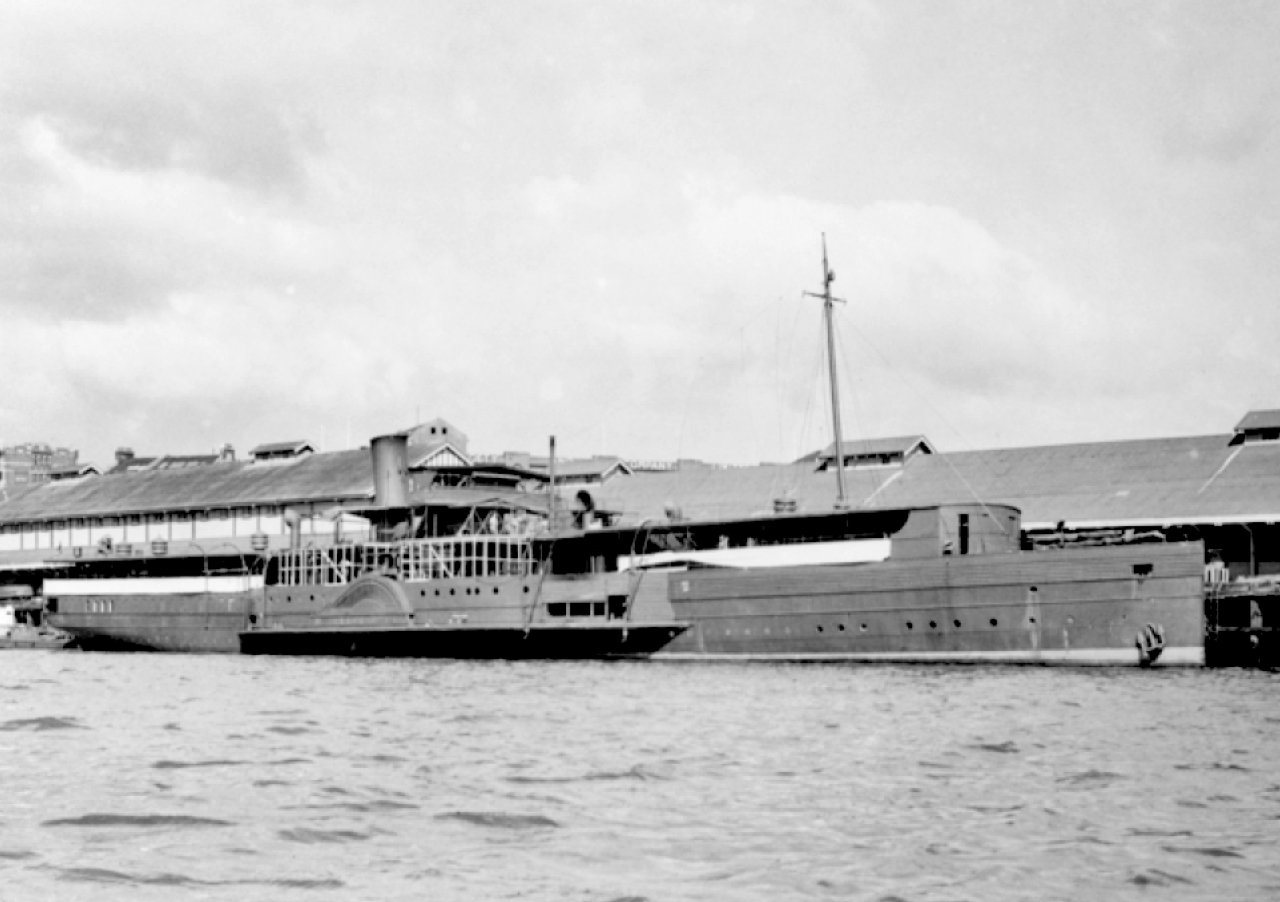
Weeroona (S-195), Small Ships Section, United States Army Services of Supply, Southwest Pacific Area, 1943.

Weeroona became part of the United States Army permanent local fleet under the Southwest Pacific Area command's supply organisation, United States Army Services of Supply, Southwest Pacific Area (USASOS SWPA), and was used extensively serving as a quarters ship for American maritime personnel. As part of the Small Ships Section the vessel was given the local fleet number S-195 and perhaps also as CSQ-1. (Note: "CSQ-1" was probably unofficial as the official reference (Thompson & Harris) notes "A fifth vessel, which they had converted into barracks to accommodate operating personnel, they dubbed CSQ (communications ship quarters)" while S numbers were used administratively for Small Ships vessels.) Weeroona was used as a quarters ship by Australian personnel under contract to the U.S. Army's Small Ships Section in Sydney and New Guinea. The ship was also used by U.S. Army Signal Corps personnel, some of whom were setting up small ships as communications ships, as barracks and dubbed CSQ for communications ship quarters. Weeroona was towed from New Guinea to the Philippines to support Allied forces there at Leyte Gulf and eventually serving as a barracks and convalescent ship in Manila until towed back to Sydney, where she lingered in the harbour until broken up in 1951.

== References cited ==
- The Argus (1946). "Vol Liquidation Of Bay Steamers Ltd". The Argus. No. 14 October 1943. Melbourne.
- AUSTRALIA @ WAR (16 October 2008). "US Army Small Ships Section—United States Army Services Of Supply (USASOS) In Australian Waters During WWII". AUSTRALIA @ WAR.
- Chronicle (1925). "A Fleet Welcome Fiasco". Chronicle. No. 1 August 1925. Adelaide, South Australia.
- Churchward, Matthew S. (July 2008). "Transport". eMelbourne. School of Historical Studies, Department of History, The University of Melbourne.
- "PS Weeroona". Clydebuilt Ships Database. Clydeships.
- Grover, David (1987). U.S. Army Ships and Watercraft of World War II. Naval Institute Press. ISBN 0-87021-766-6. LCCN 87015514.
- Lloyds (1943–44). "Lloyd's Register" (PDF). Lloyd's Register (through PlimsollShipData).
- Lunney, Bill; Finch, Frank (1995). Forgotten Fleet: a history of the part played by Australian men and ships in the U.S. Army Small Ships Section in New Guinea, 1942–1945. Medowie, NSW, Australia: Forfleet Publishing. ISBN 0646260480. LCCN 96150459.
- Mansfield, Anthony; Ortmann, Nicole; Ross, Peter (2008). Site Report PS Ozone (PDF). Portarlington, Victoria, Australia: Flinders University Maritime Archaeology Field School.
- Masterson, James R. (1949). U. S. Army Transportation In The Southwest Pacific Area 1941–1947. Washington, D. C.: Transportation Unit, Historical Division, Special Staff, U. S. Army.
- Portland Guardian (1943). "Paddle Steamer Weeroona". Portland Guardian. No. 1 November 1943. Victoria, Australia.
- Thompson, George Raynor; Harris, Dixie R. (1966). The Technical Services—The Signal Corps: The Outcome (Mid-1943 Through 1945). United States Army In World War II. Washington, DC: Center Of Military History, United States Army. LCCN 64060001.
- Thomson, Max (July 2003). "A salute to the doyen of old paddle-steamers" (PDF). Afloat. Archived from the original (PDF) on 14 May 2013.
