= PS Pioneer (1905) =

Clyde-built paddle steamer (1905 - 1958)

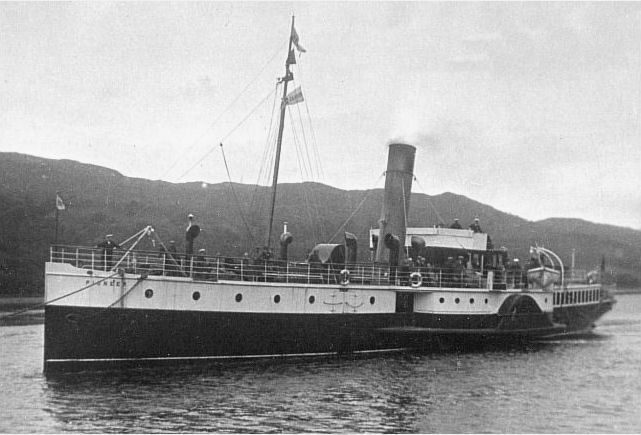
- PS Pioneer was launched in 1905. She was of a light design with small paddle wheels. Thus her paddle boxes did not protrude above the promenade deck.

History
- Name: PS Pioneer (1905–1945); HMS Harbinger (1945–1946)
- Owner: David MacBrayne Ltd
- Builder: A. & J. Inglis, Pointhouse, Glasgow
- Launched: 14 February 1905
- Fate: Scrapped 1958

General characteristics
- Tonnage: 241 GRT
- Length: 160 feet
- Propulsion: Paddle compound diagonal
- Speed: 14 knots

PS Pioneer was a Clyde-built paddle steamer launched in 1905, built by A. & J. Inglis at their Pointhouse shipyard for David MacBrayne. She served as a passenger and mail ship between the Kintyre peninsula and the islands Islay, Jura and Gigha for over thirty years. In 1939 she was moved to the Mallaig and Portree, Isle of Skye route, having been replaced by MV Lochiel.

In 1943, after being laid up for a year, she was requisitioned by the Admiralty and used as a Submarine Command HQ Ship at Fairlie, North Ayrshire. In 1945 the Admiralty purchased her and renamed her HMS Harbinger, but the following year her sponsons and paddles were removed and she was used as a floating laboratory at the Isle of Portland base.

Finally in 1958 she was sent to Rotterdam, Netherlands to be scrapped.
