= HMCS Long Branch =

Modified Flower-class corvette

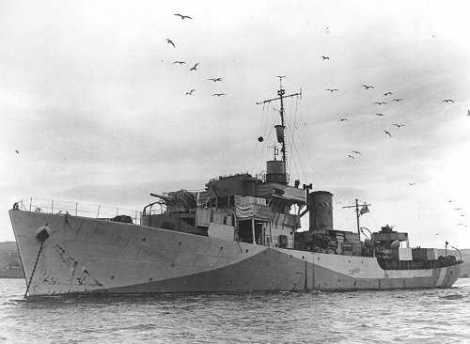
- HMCS Long Branch

History

Canada
- Name: Long Branch
- Namesake: Long Branch, Ontario
- Ordered: 25 July 1942
- Builder: A. & J. Inglis Ltd., Glasgow
- Laid down: 27 February 1943
- Launched: 28 September 1943
- Commissioned: 5 January 1944
- Decommissioned: 17 June 1945
- Identification: Pennant number: K487
- Honours and awards: Atlantic 1944-45
- Fate: Sold in 1947 as mercantile Rexton Kent II. Scuttled off Canada's Atlantic coast in 1966.

General characteristics
- Class & type: Flower-class corvette (modified)
- Displacement: 1,015 long tons (1,031 t; 1,137 short tons)
- Length: 208 ft (63.40 m)o/a
- Beam: 33 ft (10.06 m)
- Draught: 11 ft (3.35 m)
- Propulsion: single shaft, 2× oil fired water tube boilers, 1 triple-expansion reciprocating steam engine, 2,750 ihp (2,050 kW)
- Speed: 16 knots (29.6 km/h)
- Range: 3,500 nautical miles (6,482 km) at 12 knots (22.2 km/h)
- Complement: 90
- Sensors & processing systems: One Type 271 SW2C radar, one Type 144 sonar
- Armament: 1 × 4 in (102 mm) BL Mk.IX single gun; 1 × 20 mm Oerlikon twin; 2 × 20 mm Oerlikon single; 1 × Hedgehog A/S mortar; 4 × Mk.II depth charge throwers; 2 depth charge rails with 70 depth charges

HMCS Long Branch (sometimes spelled as Longbranch) was a modified Flower-class corvette that served in the Royal Canadian Navy during the Second World War. She was used primarily as a convoy escort in the Battle of the Atlantic. She was laid down as HMS Candytuft but was transferred to the RCN on 5 January 1944 before completion. She was named for Long Branch, Ontario, a village that was eventually amalgamated into Toronto, Ontario.

== Background ==
Flower-class corvettes like Long Branch serving with the Royal Canadian Navy during the Second World War were different from earlier and more traditional sail-driven corvettes. The "corvette" designation was created by the French as a class of small warships; the Royal Navy borrowed the term for a period but discontinued its use in 1877. During the hurried preparations for war in the late 1930s, Winston Churchill reactivated the corvette class, needing a name for smaller ships used in an escort capacity, in this case based on a whaling ship design. The generic name "flower" was used to designate the class of these ships, which – in the Royal Navy – were named after flowering plants.

Corvettes commissioned by the Royal Canadian Navy during the Second World War were named after communities for the most part, to better represent the people who took part in building them. This idea was put forth by Admiral Percy W. Nelles. Sponsors were commonly associated with the community for which the ship was named. Royal Navy corvettes were designed as open sea escorts, while Canadian corvettes were developed for coastal auxiliary roles which was exemplified by their minesweeping gear. Eventually the Canadian corvettes would be modified to allow them to perform better on the open seas.

== Construction ==
Candytuft was ordered 25 July 1942 as part of the Royal Navy 1942-43 Increased Endurance Flower-class building program. She was laid down 27 February 1943 by A. & J. Inglis Ltd. at Glasgow, Scotland and launched 28 September 1943. As part of an exchange for Algerine-class minesweepers that the RCN intended to use as convoy escorts, the Royal Navy transferred four Flower-class corvettes and twelve Castle-class corvettes to Canada in order to acquire them. Candytuft was transferred on 5 January 1944 and commissioned as HMCS Long Branch into the RCN at Tobermory, Mull. The only significant differences between the RCN and RN 1942-43 Flower classes was a shortened mainmast and varying anti-aircraft armament.

== Service history ==
Upon commissioning to the RCN she was tasked to join Mid-Ocean Escort Force escort group C-5 at Londonderry Port in April 1944 following a one-month work up period at Tobermory. C-5 sailed with the convoy ONS 233. Long Branch developed mechanical problems during the crossing and underwent a six-week repair at the Newfoundland Drydock upon her arrival at St. John's.

She departed St. John's on 14 June to resume duties but returned for further repairs with the assistance of HM Tug Tenacity. Once repaired, she left St. John's a week later to join convoy HXS 300, the largest convoy of the war.

She continued as an ocean escort until her final departure from Londonderry on 27 January 1945. She arrived at Halifax under the command of A/Lt.Cdr. J.B. O'Brien, RCNVR on 11 February and commenced a refit. In April she was assigned to Halifax for local duties.

Long Branch was paid off from the RCN on 17 June 1945 at Sorel, Quebec. She was transferred to the War Assets Corporation and sold for commercial use in 1947. She emerged from the conversion as Rexton Kent II, later renamed Rexton Kent. She was scuttled 5 nautical miles (9.3 km; 5.8 mi) off Cape Spencer, Nova Scotia on 22 February 1966.
