= Anthony Inglis (shipbuilder) =

Scottish journeyman blacksmith, engineer (1813–1884)

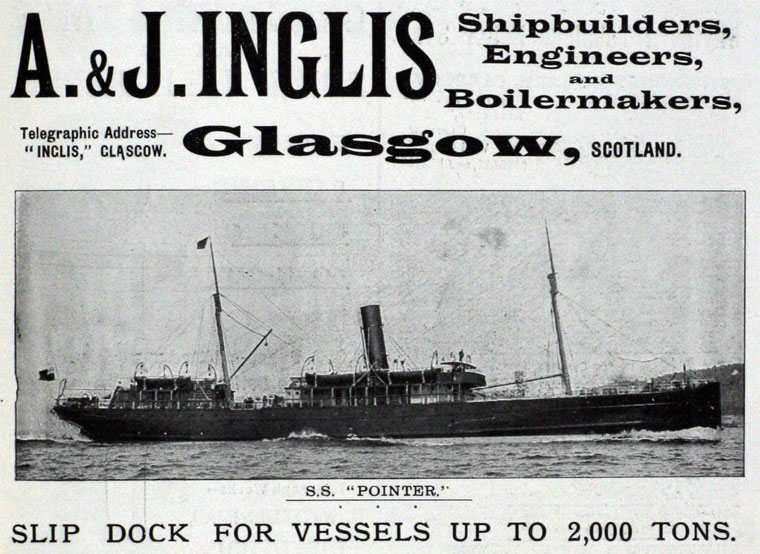
A. & J. INGLIS Shipbuilders, Engineers and Boilermakers, Glasgow, Scotland. Telegraphic Address "INGLIS," GLASGOW. S.S. Pointer. Slip Dock for Vessels up to 2,000 Tons.

Anthony Inglis (1813–1884) was a Scottish journeyman blacksmith, engineer and shipbuilder who set up and managed the well known shipyard A. & J. Inglis in Pointhouse Glasgow together with his brother John Inglis.

== Career ==
In 1837 he founded a company to provide smithwork especially to shipbuilders, from premises in Anderston. In 1847 his younger brother, John Inglis (1819–1888), joined him, who had learned the craft of marine engineering and whose practicable skills added another dimension to the company. Together they founded the company A. & J. Inglis in 1847.

They moved to larger premises in Warroch Street, Anderston, where they began to focus on marine work. In 1850 they obtained their first major marine contract, to supply the machinery for the tug ‘Clyde’. From then onwards the company grew in strength and rapidly earned a reputation for ability and at least equality to much larger and longer established firms. In 1855, the Inglis brothers provided the machinery of the large screw steamer Tasmanian, one of the largest and fastest vessels built up until that date. The success of the ‘Tasmanian’ caught the attention of William Mac Kinnon who established the British India Steam Navigation Company and the Imperial British East Africa Company. From that moment the name Inglis became synonymous with fine design and engineering. Success followed success and before long the Warroch Street premises had to be extended to cope with the increased scope of work and award of contracts.

In 1862, the Inglis brothers added shipbuilding to their engineering repertoire and for this purpose acquired an area of land in Glasgow at the confluence of the River Kelvin with the River Clyde, on which the Pointhouse Yard had existed since 1845 under ownership of Thomas B. Seath. From this yard there came many classic designs and creations of maritime beauty and success, along with the normal workmanlike dredgers, tugs, coasters, barges, tankers and whalers. After the death of Anthony Inglis in 1884 his son John Inglis took over the management of the family firm.
