= MV Lady Rose =

Canadian diesel vessel

- Lady Rose in Vancouver harbor in the 1940s.

History

Canada
- Name: MV Lady Rose
- Owner: Initially Union Steamship Company of British Columbia
- Operator: Union Steamship Co of BC, 1937–1951
- Builder: A. & J. Inglis, Pointhouse Shipyard, Glasgow
- Yard number: 997
- Launched: Wednesday, 17 March 1937
- Out of service: After 2004 and before 2009
- Identification: IMO number: 5201738; Callsign: CYCY
- Status: Awaiting restoration as a floating restaurant

General characteristics
- Class & type: coastal motorship
- Tonnage: 199 gross tons
- Length: 105 ft (32 m)
- Beam: 21 ft (6 m)
- Depth: 14 ft (4 m) depth of hold
- Installed power: diesel engine
- Speed: 11.5 knots (21.3 km/h)
- Capacity: 130 passengers (summer license); 25 tons cargo

MV Lady Rose is a small, single-screw, diesel coastal vessel, which operated on the west coast of British Columbia, Canada.

== Design and construction ==
Originally a Union Steamship Company of British Columbia vessel, she was the smallest ship ever custom ordered for them. She was built 1937 at A. & J. Inglis in Glasgow and originally christened Lady Sylvia when launched in 1937. The ship was 104.8 feet long, with a 21.2 foot beam and 14.3 depth of hold. The ship's overall size was 199 gross tons. The original engines were built by the National Gas and Oil Company, an English firm, and consisted of the main unit, a 220 horsepower diesel engine with a 28-horsepower reserve unit, The ship's speed was 11.5 knots. The ship was licensed to carry 130 people in the summer and 70 in the winter. Cargo capacity was 25 tons.

== Operations ==
Lady Rose was intended for the use on Barkley Sound.

She was designed for the sheltered coastal waters of British Columbia. However, this was the first diesel powered vessel to cross the Atlantic driven by a single propeller. She is the last survivor of the USS fleet. She operated on routes between Port Alberni, Bamfield and Ucluelet, all near or on Barkley Sound.

In 1951 Union Steamship sold Lady Rose to Harbour Navigation Company.

Later owned by Lady Rose Marine Services, she remained a vital cargo link to Bamfield until the beginning of the 21st century, although her primary cargo has always been passengers, as she was built as a day-tripper for Union Steamship. In 2012 she was moored in Tofino at Jamie's Whaling Station where she awaited restoration.

Lady Rose was acquired by the Clayton family of Sechelt in September 2019 and she was relocated to the MacKenzie Marina in Sechelt soon thereafter. Restoration plans are still being formulated.
