= SS Safra El-Bahr =

History
- Builder: A. & J. Inglis, Pointhouse, Glasgow, Scotland
- Yard number: 232
- Launched: 11 May 1894
- Fate: Sunk 20 April 1941

General characteristics
- Type: Initially yacht, later converted to passenger vessel
- Tonnage: 675 GRT

The Egyptian Royal Yacht SS Safra El-Bahr for the Khedive of Egypt, Alexandria, was built in 1894 with 675 Gross Register Tonnage. In 1915-1919 she was hired by Royal Navy as patrol vessel. In 1920 she was purchased by G. C. Dracoulis, Ithaca and converted from a yacht to a passenger vessel and renamed SS Ithaki. In 1929 she was purchased by Hellenic Coast Lines, Piraeus, Greece. On 20 April 1941 she was bombed and sunk in an air raid in Suda Bay.
