= Craigendoran =

Coordinates: 55.997°N 4.708°W

Craigendoran (Gaelic: Creag an Dòbhrain) is a suburb at the eastern end of Helensburgh in Scotland, on the northern shore of the Firth of Clyde. The name is from the Gaelic for "the rock of the otter".

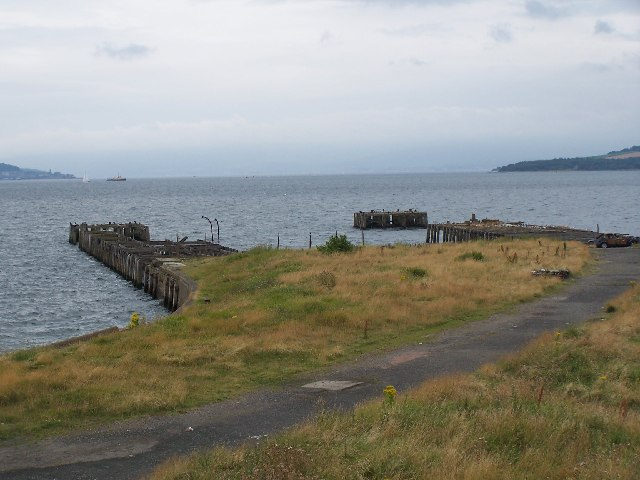
Craigendoran pier

It is served by Craigendoran railway station. Craigendoran pier was next to the station, with the railway connecting with Clyde steamers. This pier has since closed and fallen into disrepair.

Hermitage Academy is on the eastern outskirts of Craigendoran.
