= British Polar Engines =

British Polar Engines Limited
- Industry: Engineering
- Founded: 1927
- Headquarters: Glasgow, Scotland
- Products: Stationary and Marine Diesel Engines
- Subsidiaries: Kelvin Diesels
- Website: www.britishpolarengines.co.uk

British Polar Engines is a manufacturer of diesel engines based in Glasgow, Scotland. The company has over seventy years' experience in the manufacture and supply of spare parts for diesel engines. The engine and company take their name from the engine supplied to Roald Amundsen's Fram, from which he conquered the South Pole.

== Company ==
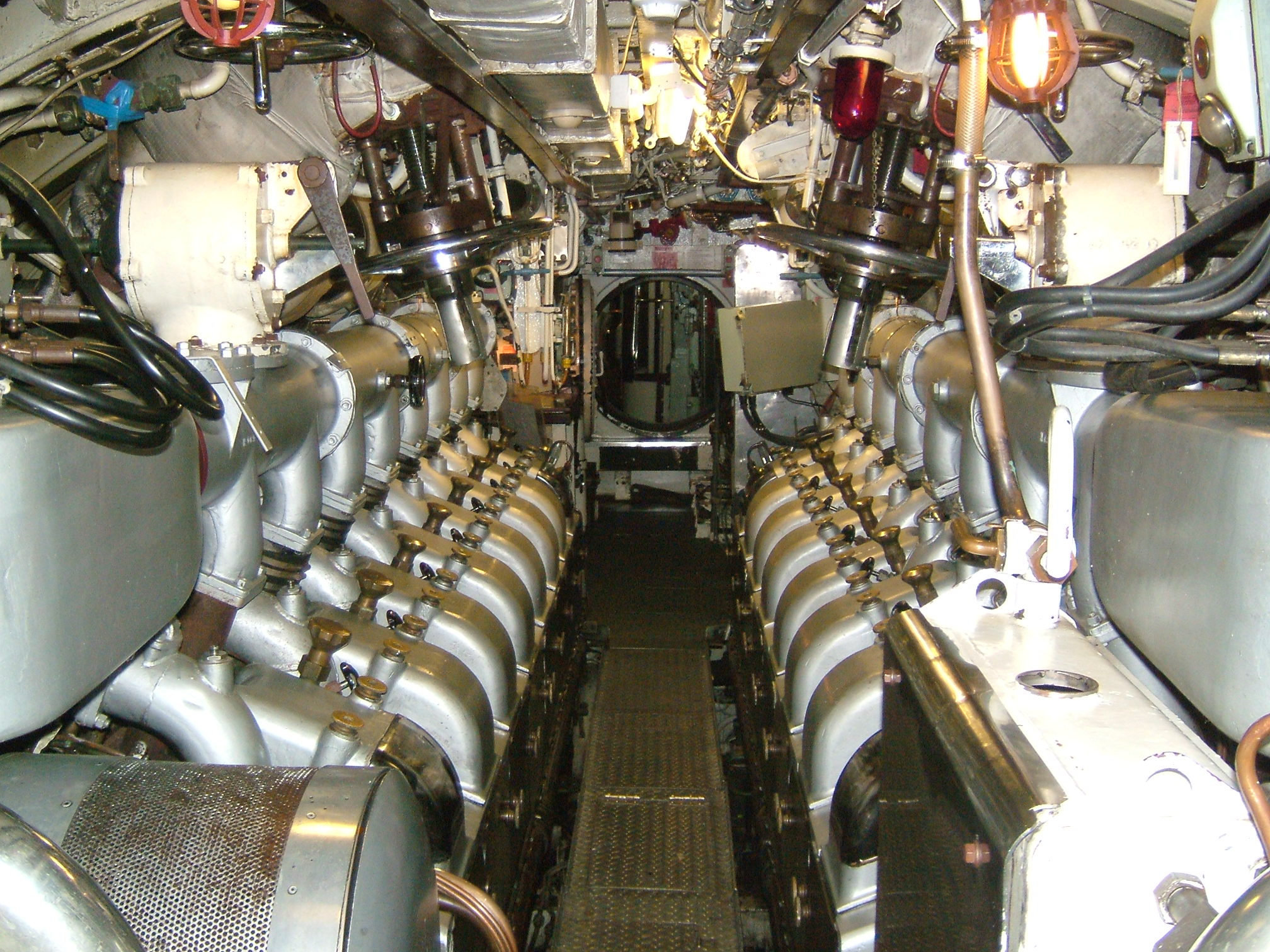
The British Polar Engines Diesel Motors of the Oberon-class submarine HMS Ocelot. The engines charged the batteries for the silent electric propulsion of the ship. HMS Ocelot is now a museum ship in Chatham Dockyard.

British Polar Engines manufactures, supplies and installs medium speed marine diesel engines and industrial generating sets. Their engines are in a variety of vessels, including ferries, warships, fishing boats and small tugs. They supply suitable replacement parts for a variety of engines, including all E, I, M, N and T ranges of Polar engines and former NOHAB and Wärtsilä engines. They also supply a full range of parts for the Admiralty Standard Range ASR1 engines found in Oberon-class submarines and Leopard- and Salisbury-class frigates.

The works have been organised to provide a continuous flow of engine components through the machines to the assembly bays. Extended inspection, test bed and storage facilities contribute to increased output of finished engines. The company are specialists in the servicing and maintenance of diesel engines for all applications. It inspects, machines and overhauls all engine components, including crankshafts, cylinder heads, connecting rods, fuel equipment and engine pumps. There are in-house testing facilities for engines from 20 to 2,500 hp (15 to 1,864 kW) and generating sets up to 2 Megawatt.

=== History ===
The company was founded in 1927 as Fiat British Auxiliaries, Ltd. In 1931 it was reconstructed as British Auxiliaries Ltd and in August 1944 it changed its name to British Polar Engines Limited.

== Polar diesel engines ==
The first Polar two-cycle engine was installed in a seagoing vessel in 1907. Note: These engines were built by AB Diesels Motorer in Sickla, Sweden, which later merged with AB Atlas in 1917 to form Atlas Diesel. “Polar” was a brand/trade name for Atlas’s early two‑stroke marine diesels. In 1911, the first motor vessel to cross the Atlantic, the Swan Hunter-built ore-carrier Toiler, was powered by a Polar engine. At about the same time Roald Amundsen in the Fram was conquering the South Pole, and it is from that successful expedition that the engine derives its name.

Other ships that have made history with Polar engines include the Girl Pat, the rescue tugs HMS Bustler, HMS Turmoil and Canadian sealer, MV Theron, chosen for the 1956 Commonwealth Trans-Antarctic Expedition.

British Polar engines were of the two-cycle type, built under licence from Nydqvist & Holm, Trollhättan, Sweden. Their development has continued over the years. The basic design with airless injection was introduced in 1928. It was an immediate success: reliable, economic, easy to manoeuvre and remarkably simple in design and construction. This early design has been developed and extended to a wide range of engine sizes covering powers from 300 to 4,000 bhp (220 to 2,980 kW) without supercharging.

In 2000, the company purchased Kelvin Diesels, concentrating engine production at Helen Street in Glasgow.
