= A. & J. Inglis =

Defunct ship building company in Glasgow, Scotland

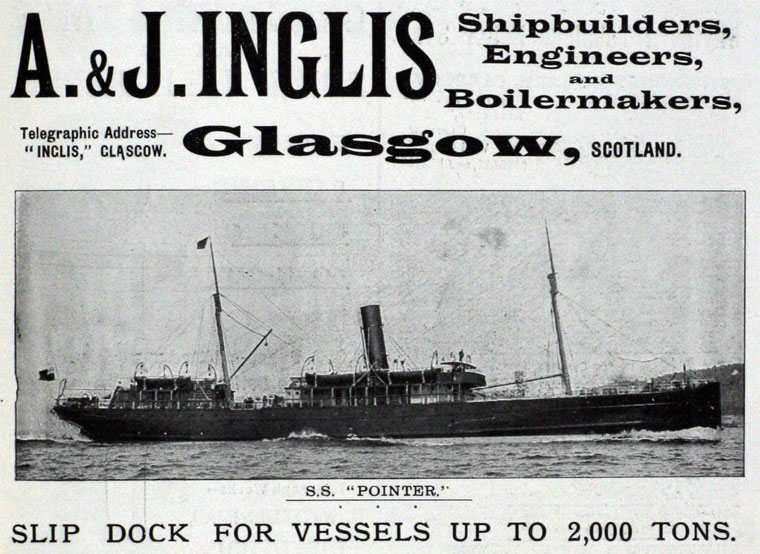
A. & J. INGLIS- Shipbuilders, Engineers and Boilermakers, Glasgow, Scotland. Telegraphic Address "INGLIS," GLASGOW. S.S. Pointer. Slip Dock for Vessels up to 2,000 Tons.

A & J Inglis Limited, was a shipbuilding firm founded by Anthony Inglis and his brother John, engineers and shipbuilders in the Partick area of Glasgow, Scotland in 1862. The firm built over 500 ships in a period of just over 100 years. Their Pointhouse Shipyard was at the confluence of the rivers Clyde and Kelvin. They constructed a wide range of ships, including Clyde steamers, paddle steamers and small ocean liners. In wartime, they built small warships, and in the period after World War II, they built a number of whalers.

== History ==
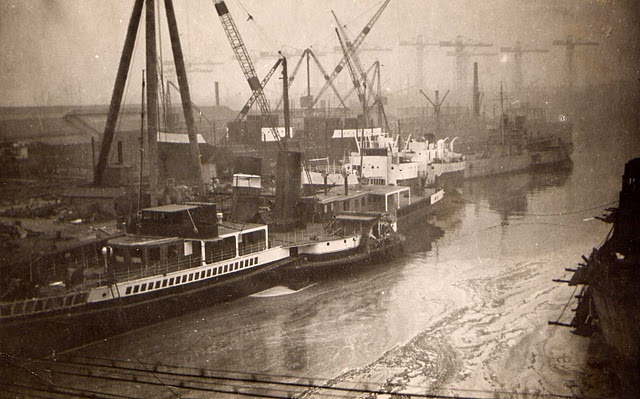
A & J Inglis shipyard from the bridge over the River Kelvin in 1946. On the left is Clyde paddle steamer Jeanie Deans. Behind are two Empire tankers and the diesel electric paddle ship Talisman being restored after serving as HMS Aristocrat.

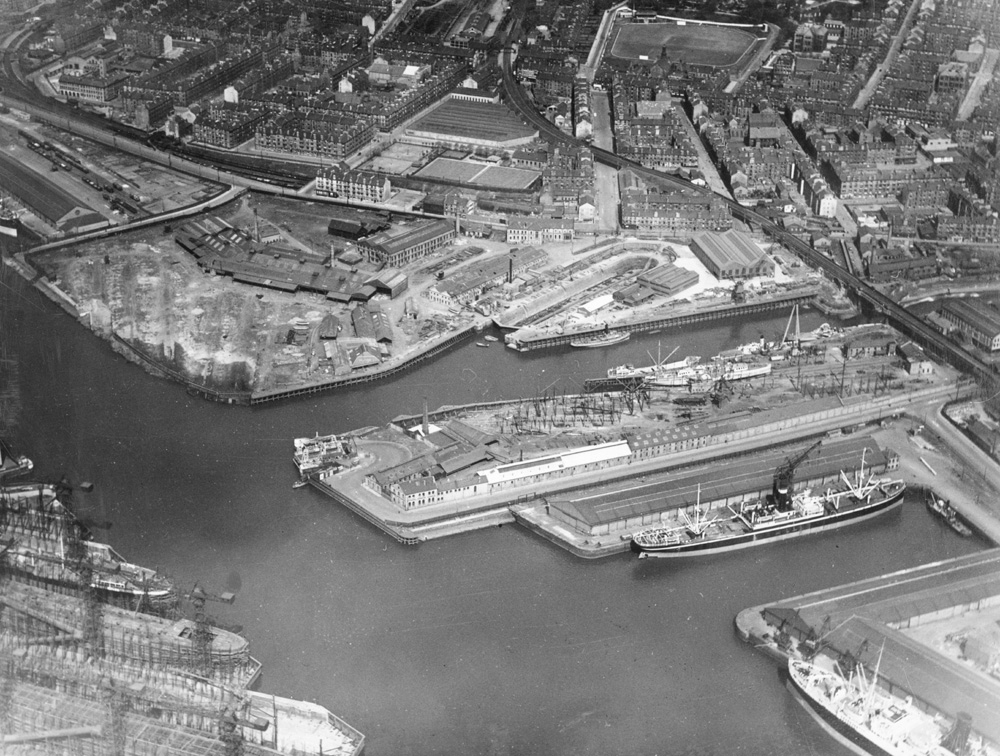
Three Harland & Wolff shipyards on the Clyde in the 1930s: The former A & J Inglis (east) shipyards at the top right with the tripod crane, the former D & W Henderson's (on the west bank of the Kelvin) and opposite the company's yard in Govan (on the site of the Govan Old, Govan New and Middleton yards) is at the bottom, left.

A & J Inglis of Glasgow was formed in 1848 as an engineering works. Thomas B. Seath founded the shipyard at Pointhouse in 1845 and it was acquired by A & J Inglis in 1862. In 1884 Anthony Inglis died and his son John Inglis took over. John Inglis himself, was well known for many maritime activities. In 1885 they launched 11 ships with a total tonnage of 7,470 tons.

In 1867, a Patent Slip Dock for ship repairs was built at Pointhouse. This was an innovative alternative to a dry dock, invented by Robert Napier. The vessel sat on a big trolley, which was on rails, and was hauled up onto dry land by a powerful winch. The yard had up to 2,000 employees on just 18 acres of ground plus approximately 300 workers at the former premises of the company in Whitehall Foundry.

In 1897, the Transatlantic Company of Paris ordered two of a total of ten fast mail steamers for their African service at A & J Inglis. Inglis delivered two weeks ahead of their competitors. The French owners were impressed and checked carefully that the fast-track build programme had not resulted in an inferior quality, but found no evidence of this, on the contrary they were delighted with the high standard of construction achieved.

Harland & Wolff bought controlling shares in the company in 1919 but the yard remained independent. After Harland & Wolff, who also owned a larger yard on the opposite bank of the Clyde at Govan, opted to consolidate its operations in Belfast. The Pointhouse yard closed in 1962, was demolished in 1973 and its southern part is now the site of the new Riverside Museum.

== Ships ==
=== Clippers and yachts ===
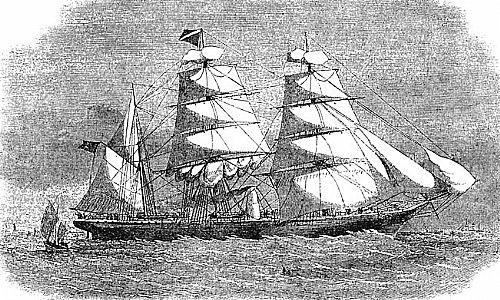
SS Erl King was launched in 1865

The clipper Norman Court was launched in 1869

Some of the first ships built by the shipyard were propelled by a combination of sails and steam engines. Because of their elegant design and high speed they were recognised as leading-edge representatives of their class.

The shipyard became famous by building the British Royal Yacht Alexandra and the Egyptian Royal Yacht SS Safra El-Bahr. The turbine yacht TS Vanadis was built of steel, rigged as a triple screw schooner and, unusually, was powered by steam turbines.

=== Paddle steamers ===
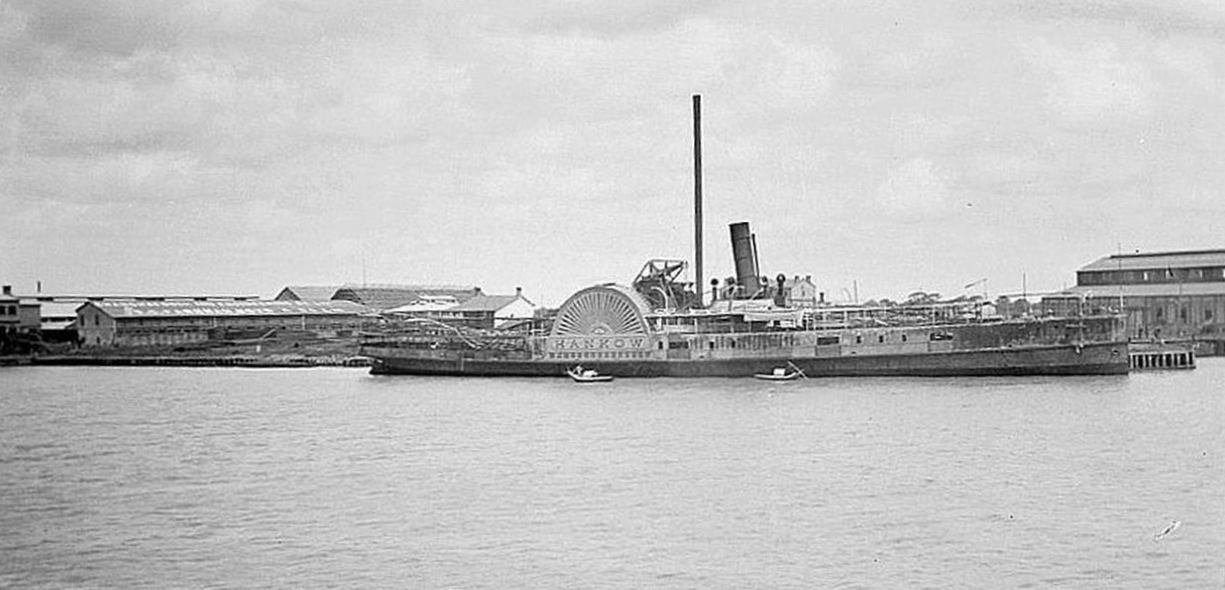
PS Hankow was built for the China Navigation Company in 1874

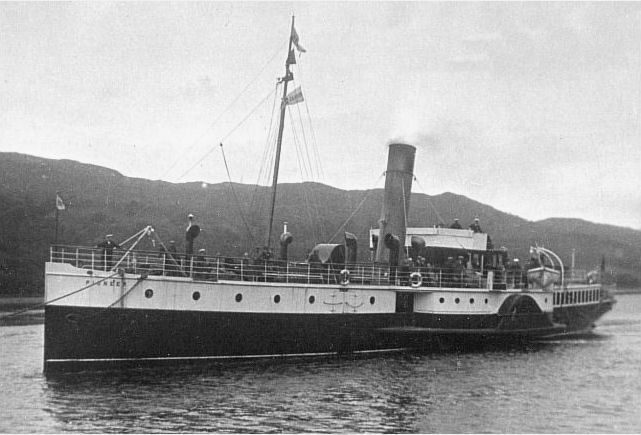
PS Pioneer was launched in 1905. She was of a light design with small paddle wheels, which did not protrude above the promenade deck.

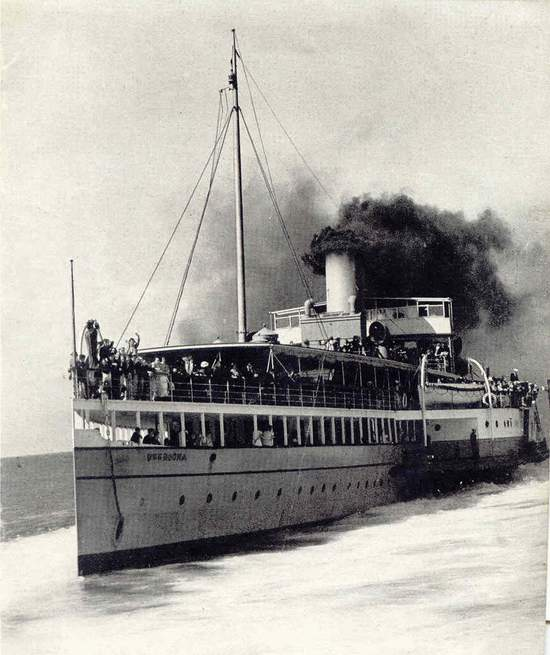
The paddle steamer PS Weeroona

Famous ships built by the firm include the paddle steamer Waverley, now the world's last seagoing paddle steamer. Other Inglis-built paddle steamers include the Maid of the Loch, which still serves as a visitor attraction on Loch Lomond, and the forerunner to the Humber Bridge, PS Lincoln Castle which was controversially broken up in situ at Grimsby's Alexandra Dock, despite her uniqueness of design as what was likely to have been Inglis's only cargo carrying estuary paddle steamer; designed chiefly as a practical workhorse as opposed to a more elegant 'pleasure steamer' image more commonly associated with paddle steamers. In ocean-going service, paddle steamers became much less useful after the invention of the screw propeller, but they remained in use in coastal service and as river tugboats, thanks to their shallow draught and good manoeuvrability.

=== Conversions and extensions ===
The shipyard was also specialised in conversions: On 16 May 1901 the TS King Edward was launched, which had been built by William Denny and Brothers in Dumbarton. The builders hoped to attain a speed of 20 knots (37 km/h) with the turbine machinery. However, on 24 June 1901 in seven return runs over the mile, the best mean speed attained was 19.7 knots (36.5 km/h). On the next day at the Pointhouse yard of A. & J. Inglis the central propeller of 4 feet (1.2 m) diameter was exchanged for one of 4 feet 9 inches (1.45 m) diameter, and the outer propellers of 2 feet 10 inches (0.86 m) diameter were exchanged for propellers 3 feet 4 inches (1.02 m) diameter. Trials on 26 June 1901 achieved a mean of 20.48 knots (37.93 km/h).

In 1905, an extension and rebuild of the SS Mahroussa was undertaken. The ship had been originally built for Isma'il Pasha, the Khedive of Egypt and was later renamed to SS El Horria. The two paddle wheels were replaced by triple screws powered by steam turbines built by Inglis at their Warroch Street Engine Works in Glasgow. Inglis were one of the first companies licensed by the Parsons Marine Steam Turbine Company Wallsend for the manufacture of steam turbines in their own works. The ship was still in use in 2001 as a luxury yacht.

=== Railway ferries ===
Inglis built eight ferries between 1907 and 1929 for the Entre Rios Railways Co. in Argentina. These were used between 1907 and 1990 to cross the Paraná River and join the Buenos Aires province and the Entre Rios province, until new bridges were built over the rivers they crossed:

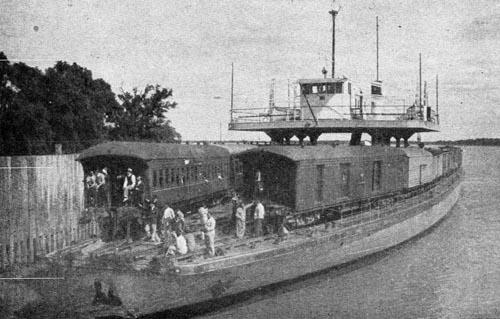
Argentine train diesel ferry, the 3rd generation ferries, from the 1930s

- Lucía Carbó (1907)
- María Parera (1908)
- Mercedes Lacroze (1909)
- Roque Saenz Peña (1911)
- Exequiel Ramos Mejía (1913)
- Dolores de Urquiza (1926)
- Delfina Mitre (1928)
- Carmen Avellaneda (1929)

Pictures of the Argentine train ferries at the Histarmar website.

=== Motor vessels ===
The MV Lady Rose was originally christened Lady Sylvia when launched in 1937 for the use on Barkley Sound. She was designed for the sheltered coastal waters of British Columbia. However, this was the first diesel powered vessel to cross the Atlantic driven by a single propeller. Lady Rose was acquired by the Clayton family of Sechelt in September 2019 and she was relocated to the MacKenzie Marina in Sechelt soon thereafter. Restoration plans are still being formulated.

MV Aqueity and MV Anonity were 890 GRT coastal tankers built in 1945 for the Ministry of War Transport (MoWT).

== Lightships ==
The North Carr Lightship was launched in 1932 and created quite a stir in Edinburgh on account of her fog horn being tested while lying ¾ mile off Granton, Edinburgh in the Firth of Forth. As the fog horn had a range of approximately 10 miles, north Edinburgh could hear it loud and clear and the complaints were numerous - particularly as it was being sounded in clear weather. "Hundreds of city dwellers have had no sleep over three consecutive nights" and "The most flagrant individual breach of the peace is as nothing compared with the ceaseless boom and consequent suffering of the past three nights" were typical statements at the time.

== Selection of military ships ==
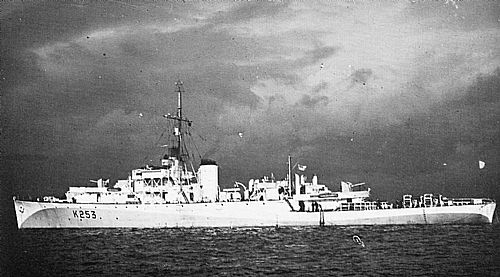
HMS Helmsdale

During the Second World War the shipyard diversified into the built of military ships:

- HMS Coreopsis laid down 13 October 1939, launched 23 May 1940 and completed 17 August 1940. Transferred to Greece as Kriezis.
- HMS Crocus laid down 26 October 1939, launched 26 June 1940 and completed 20 October 1940.
- HMS Rumba and HMS Sarabande – Dance-class armed trawlers - Both launched 1940, sold 1946
- HMT Romeo – Shakespearian-class naval trawler – Launched 1941, sold 1946
- HMT Rosalind (T135) – Shakespearian-class naval trawler – Launched 3 May 1941, transferred to Kenya 1946, joined Royal East African Navy 1952, redeployed to Madagascar 1964
- HMCS Long Branch was a Flower-class corvette that was launched on 28 September 1943 and served in the Royal Canadian Navy.
- HMS Stronsay, HMS Switha and HMS Oxna – Isles-class naval trawlers - Launched 1942-43
- HMS Oakham Castle – Castle-class corvette – Launched 10 December 1944, Became OWS Weather Reporter in 1957.
- HMS Norham Castle – originally Totnes Castle – Castle-class corvette – Launched 12 April 1944. Transferred to Canada as HMCS Humberstone 1944. Sold for mercantile service 1947
- Empire Shetland was an 813 GRT Empire coaster. Launched on 19 January 1945 and completed in April 1945. Sold in 1948 to Kuwait Oil Company and renamed Adib. Operated under the management of Angli-Iranian Oil Co Ltd. Sold in 1952 to Shell-Mex & BP and renamed BP Transporter. Scrapped in June 1965 in Antwerp, Belgium.

=== Cancelled military orders ===
Several military orders for corvettes and tankers were cancelled at the end of the Second World War:

- Dover Castle and Dudley Castle - Castle class corvettes - ordered 19 January 1943.
- Empire Tedellen was to have been an 890 GRT coastal tanker but the contract for building her was cancelled. The Empire ships were a series of ships in the service of the British Government. Their names were all prefixed with "Empire". Mostly they were used during World War II by the Ministry of War Transport (MoWT), who owned the ships but contracted out their management to various shipping lines.
