= HMS Lancaster Castle =

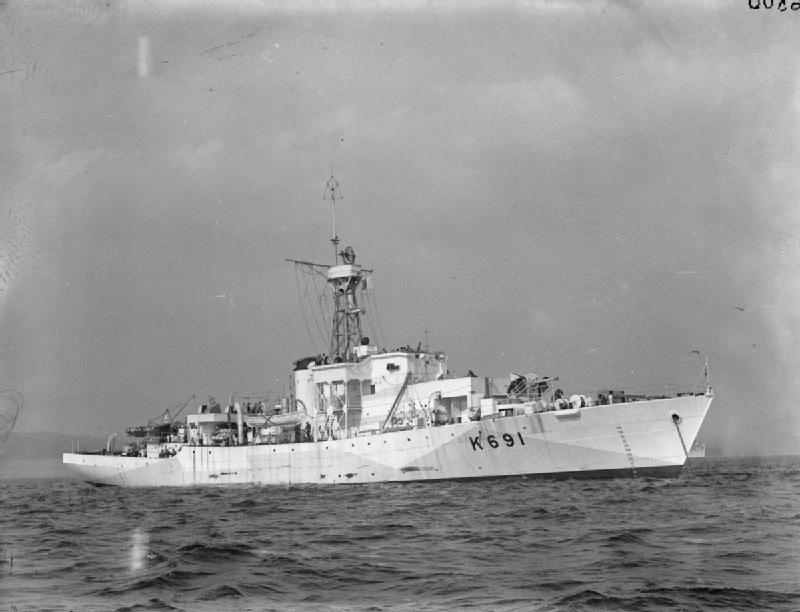
- Lancaster Castle in March 1945

History

United Kingdom
- Name: Lancaster Castle
- Namesake: Lancaster Castle
- Builder: Fleming & Ferguson
- Laid down: 10 September 1943
- Launched: 14 April 1944
- Commissioned: 15 September 1944
- Decommissioned: 1947
- Identification: Pennant number: K691
- Fate: Scrapped, 6 September 1960

General characteristics (as built)
- Class & type: Castle-class corvette
- Displacement: 1,010 long tons (1,030 t) (standard)
- Length: 252 ft (76.8 m)
- Beam: 33 ft (10.1 m)
- Draught: 13 ft 9 in (4.2 m) (deep load)
- Installed power: 2 Admiralty 3-drum boilers; 2,880 ihp (2,150 kW)
- Propulsion: 1 shaft, 1 triple-expansion engine
- Speed: 16.5 knots (30.6 km/h; 19.0 mph)
- Range: 6,500 nmi (12,000 km; 7,500 mi) at 15 knots (28 km/h; 17 mph)
- Complement: 99
- Sensors & processing systems: Type 145 and Type 147 ASDIC; Type 272 search radar; HF/DF radio direction finder
- Armament: 1 × QF 4 in (102 mm) DP gun; 2 × twin, 2 × single 20 mm (0.8 in) AA guns; 1 × 3-barrel Squid anti-submarine mortar; 1 × depth charge rail and 2 throwers; 15 depth charges

HMS Lancaster Castle (K691) was a Castle-class corvette of the Royal Navy. It served on convoy defence duties from 1944 to 1945, it was put in reserve in 1946 and eventually scrapped in 1960.

== History ==
Lancaster Castle was ordered on 19 December 1942 from Fleming and Ferguson, a Scottish shipbuilding company in Paisley, Renfrewshire. It was laid down on 10 November 1943 as Job Number 1546. It was launched on 14 April 1944, becoming the first Royal Navy ship to carry the name, and was commissioned on 15 September 1944.

In November 1944, Lancaster Castle joined 31st Escort Group. The other ships in the group were Berkeley Castle, Carisbrooke Castle, Dumbarton Castle, and Hadleigh Castle. In December, the group deployed to the Atlantic North West Approaches for convoy defence duties. They continued in this role through to March 1945 when they were detached for Russian convoy defence with Home Fleet units. A notable incident in this period was on 20 March 1945 when escorting convoy JW 65, they came under attack by six U-Boats, resulting in the loss of HMS Lapwing and the American merchant ships Horace Bushnel and Thomas Donaldson.

On 1 April 1945 they were detached from their escort of convoy RA 65 on arrival at Scapa Flow and continued convoy defence duties with 31st Escort Group in British coastal waters. On 8 May, following the cessation of hostilities with Germany, the Lancaster Castle was released from convoy defence duties and deployed in home waters for the support of occupation forces and the collection of surrendered U-Boats.

In 1946, the Lancaster Castle was paid-off and put in reserve at Portsmouth. The ship later refitted at Cardiff before being transferred to the Reserve Fleet Division in Harwich in 1949. After this closed in 1953, it was transferred to Hartlepool where it was laid-up before being put on the Disposal List in 1957. It was offered to Norway but was declined, and so was sold for demolition in Gateshead. It arrived for scrapping on 6 September 1960.
