= HMS Hever Castle =

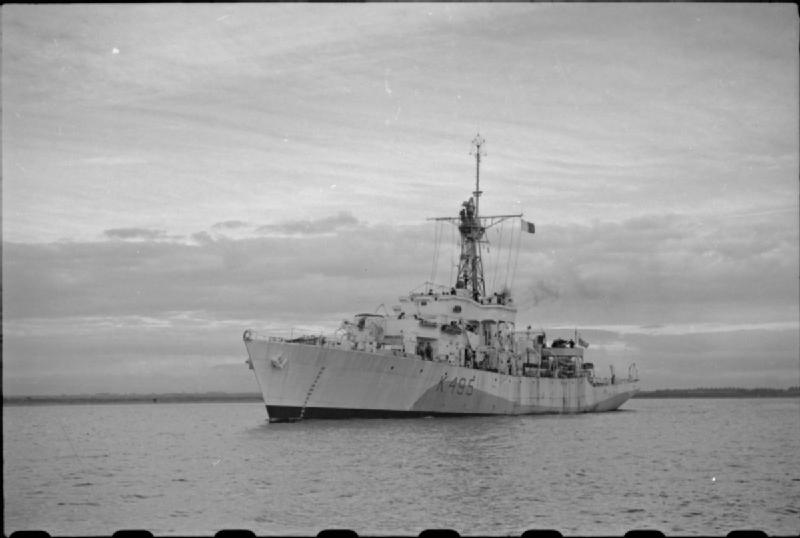
- As HMCS Copper Cliff during the Second World War

History

United Kingdom
- Name: Hever Castle
- Namesake: Hever Castle
- Ordered: 23 January 1943
- Builder: Blyth Shipbuilding and Dry Dock Company, Blyth
- Laid down: 29 June 1943
- Launched: 24 February 1944
- Identification: Pennant number: K521
- Fate: Transferred to the Royal Canadian Navy

Canada
- Name: Copper Cliff
- Namesake: Copper Cliff, Ontario
- Acquired: 1943
- Commissioned: 25 February 1944
- Decommissioned: 21 November 1945
- Identification: Pennant number: K495
- Honours and awards: Atlantic 1944–45
- Fate: Sold for mercantile service 1946

China
- Name: Ta Lung
- Acquired: 1946
- Commissioned: 1949
- Decommissioned: 1968
- Renamed: Wan Lee (1949)

General characteristics (as built)
- Type: Castle-class corvette
- Displacement: 1,060 long tons (1,077 t)
- Length: 252 ft (77 m)
- Beam: 36 ft 8 in (11.18 m)
- Draught: 13 ft 6 in (4.11 m)
- Installed power: 2 × water-tube boilers; 2,750 ihp (2,050 kW)
- Propulsion: 1 × 4-cylinder triple-expansion steam engine; Single screw
- Speed: 16.5 knots (30.6 km/h; 19.0 mph)
- Range: 6,200 nmi (11,500 km) at 15 kn (28 km/h; 17 mph)
- Complement: 120
- Sensors & processing systems: Type 272 radar; Type 145 sonar; Type 147B sonar
- Armament: 1 × QF 4-inch Mk XIX gun; 1 × Squid anti-submarine mortar; 1 × Depth charge rail, 15 depth charges; 4–10 × 20 mm anti-aircraft cannon

HMS Hever Castle was a Castle-class corvette constructed for the British Royal Navy in the Second World War. Transferred to the Royal Canadian Navy before completion, the ship was renamed HMCS Copper Cliff and saw service as a convoy escort for the remainder of the war. Following the war, the vessel was sold for mercantile use and renamed Ta Lung, operating under a Chinese flag. In 1949, the ship was taken over by the Communist Chinese government, rearmed and renamed Wan Lee.

== Design and description ==
The Castle class were an improved corvette design over their predecessor Flower class. The Flower class was not considered acceptable for mid-Atlantic sailing and was only used on Atlantic convoy duty out of need. Though the Admiralty would have preferred Loch-class frigates, the inability of many small shipyards to construct the larger ships required them to come up with a smaller vessel. The increased length of the Castle class over their predecessors and their improved hull form gave the Castles better speed and performance on patrol in the North Atlantic and an acceptable replacement for the Flowers. This, coupled with improved anti-submarine armament in the form of the Squid mortar led to a much more capable anti-submarine warfare (ASW) vessel. However, the design did have criticisms, mainly in the way it handled at low speeds and that the class's maximum speed was already slower than the speeds of the new U-boats they would be facing.

A Castle-class corvette was 252 feet (77 m) long with a beam of 36 feet 8 inches (11.18 m) and a draught of 13 feet 6 inches (4.11 m) at deep load. (Note: Brown states the beam at 36.5 feet (11.1 m) and the draught at 13.5 feet (4.1 m)) The ships displaced 1,060 long tons (1,077 t) standard and 1,580 long tons (1,605 t) deep load. (Note: Chesneau states the displacement at deep load as 1,590–1,630 long tons (1,616–1,656 t)) The ships had a complement of 120. (Note: Brown states the complement as 99 and Johnston states the complement of Canadian ships at 112 (7 officers and 105 ratings).)

The ships were powered by two Admiralty three-drum boilers which created 2,750 indicated horsepower (2,050 kW). This powered one vertical triple expansion engine that drove one shaft, giving the ships a maximum speed of 16.5 knots (30.6 km/h; 19.0 mph). The ships carried 480 tons of oil giving them a range of 6,200 nautical miles (11,500 km; 7,100 mi) at 15 knots (28 km/h; 17 mph).

The corvettes were armed with one QF 4-inch Mk XIX gun mounted forward. (Note: Mk XIX = Mark 19. Britain used Roman numerals to denote Marks (models) of ordnance until after World War II. This was the nineteenth model of British QF 4-inch gun) Anti-air armament varied from 4 to 10 Oerlikon 20 mm cannons. For ASW purposes, the ships were equipped with one three-barreled Squid anti-submarine mortar with 81 projectiles. The ships also had two depth charge throwers and one depth charge rail on the stern that came with 15 depth charges.

The ships were equipped with Type 145 and Type 147B ASDIC. The Type 147B was tied to the Squid anti-submarine mortar and would automatically set the depth on the fuses of the projectiles until the moment of firing. A single Squid-launched attack had a success rate of 25%. The class was also provided with HF/DF and Type 277 radar.

== Construction and career ==
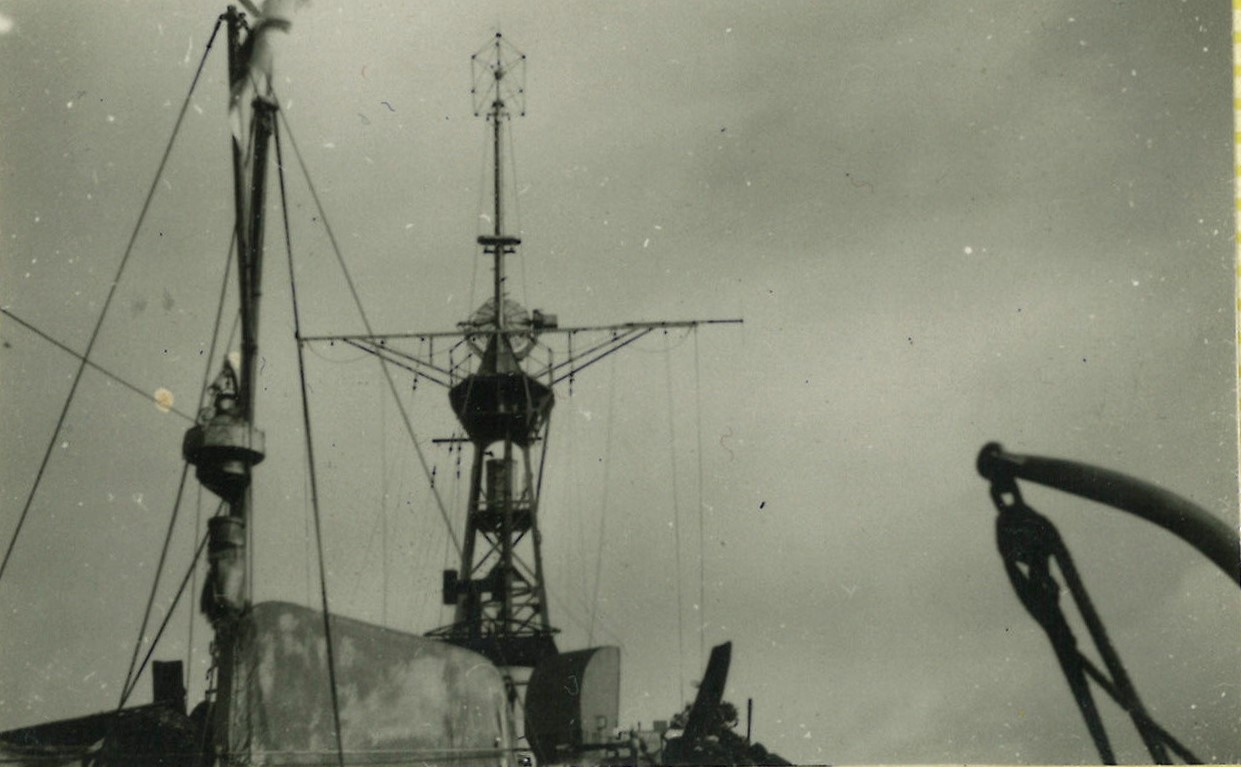
The wire-mesh Outfit AUJ antenna of the Type 277 radar was fit to the top of the main mast for testing in September 1944. It is seen here facing away from the camera.

Hever Castle was ordered on 23 January 1943. The ship, named for Hever Castle in Hever, Kent, was laid down on 29 June 1943 and launched on 24 February 1944. At some point in 1943, the ship was transferred to the Royal Canadian Navy. The corvette, renamed Copper Cliff after a suburb of Sudbury, Ontario, was commissioned into the Royal Canadian Navy on 25 February 1944 with the pennant number K495.

After working up at Tobermory, Copper Cliff was assigned to the Mid-Ocean Escort Force as part of the escort group C-6 as a convoy escort in August 1944. During a boiler cleaning in September, she was used to test the Type 277 radar. In October, Copper Cliff switched to group C-7 and remained on escort duty for the remainder of the war. In June 1945, Copper Cliff returned to Canada, stopping in Halifax, before continuing on to her final destination of Esquimalt, British Columbia. It was there on 21 November 1945 that Copper Cliff was paid off and placed in reserve.

In 1946, Copper Cliff was sold for mercantile use under a Chinese flag and renamed Ta Lung. Converted to a cargo ship, the vessel had a gross register tonnage of 1,305 tons. The ship was renamed Wan Lee in 1947 and was taken over by the Communist Chinese government in 1949. (Note: Colledge has the ship renamed Kuang Chou when taken over by Communist China, however, they also have HMCS Bowmanville renamed Kuang Chou when that ship was taken over and most other sources agree with that.) The ship remained listed until 1968, however, following that the ship's existence remained doubtful even though it was reported on until 1977–78. Miramar claims the ship was wrecked on 12 April 1948 at 37°25′N 122°41′E.
