= HMS Rising Castle =

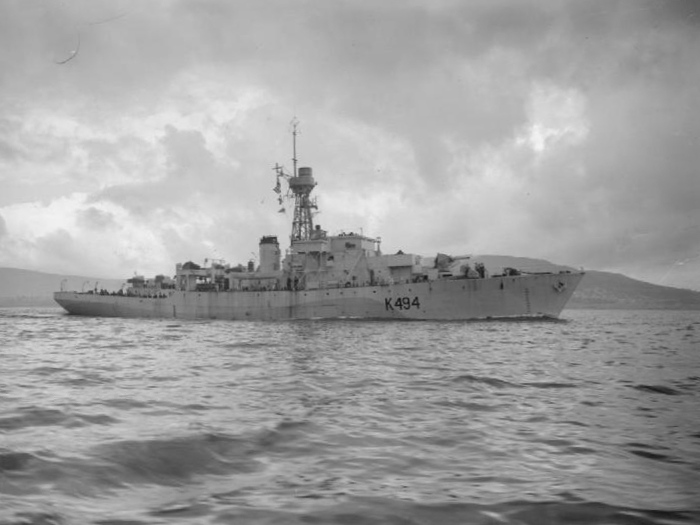
- As HMCS Arnprior

History

United Kingdom
- Name: Rising Castle
- Namesake: Castle Rising
- Ordered: 23 January 1943
- Builder: Harland & Wolff, Belfast
- Yard number: 1240
- Laid down: 21 June 1943
- Launched: 8 February 1944
- Completed: 26 June 1944
- Identification: Pennant number: K398
- Fate: Transferred to the Royal Canadian Navy

Canada
- Name: Arnprior
- Namesake: Arnprior, Ontario
- Commissioned: 8 June 1944
- Decommissioned: 14 March 1946
- Identification: Pennant number: K494
- Honours and awards: Atlantic 1944–45
- Fate: Sold to Uruguay in 1946 and renamed Montevideo

Uruguay
- Name: Montevideo
- Operator: National Navy of Uruguay
- Acquired: 1946
- Decommissioned: 1975
- Fate: Sold in 1975

General characteristics
- Type: Castle-class corvette
- Displacement: 1,060 long tons (1,077 t)
- Length: 252 ft (77 m)
- Beam: 36 ft 8 in (11.18 m)
- Draught: 13 ft 6 in (4.11 m)
- Installed power: 2,750 ihp (2,050 kW)
- Propulsion: 2 × water-tube boilers; 1 × 4-cylinder triple-expansion steam engine; Single screw
- Speed: 16.5 knots (30.6 km/h; 19.0 mph)
- Range: 9,500 nmi (17,600 km) at 10 kn (19 km/h; 12 mph)
- Complement: 112
- Sensors & processing systems: Type 272 radar; Type 144Q sonar; Type 147B sonar
- Armament: 1 × 4-inch (102-mm) Quick Firing Mk.XIX High Angle/Low Angle combined air/surface gun; 1 × Squid anti-submarine mortar; 1 × depth charge rail, 15 depth charges; 2 × 20 mm twin anti-aircraft cannon; 2 × 20 mm single anti-aircraft cannon

HMS Rising Castle was a Castle-class corvette built for the Royal Navy in World War II. She was named for Castle Rising in Norfolk, England. Before she was commissioned she was transferred to the Royal Canadian Navy and renamed Arnprior and given a new pennant number. After the war she was sold to Uruguay and renamed Montevideo.

== Design ==
The Castle-class corvettes were an improvement over the previous Flower class for use as a convoy escort, due to their improved seagoing performance. The corvettes displaced 1,060 long tons (1,077 t) with a length of 252 feet (77 m), a beam of 36 feet 8 inches (11.18 m) and a draught of 10 feet (3.0 m).

The ships were powered by two Admiralty 3-drum type water-tube boilers creating 2,750 indicated horsepower (2,050 kW). This powered one 4-cylinder triple-expansion engine, driving one shaft, giving the Castle-class corvettes a maximum speed of 16.5 knots (30.6 km/h; 19.0 mph). The corvettes could carry 480 tons of oil giving them a range of 9,500 nautical miles (17,600 km) at 10 knots (19 km/h; 12 mph).

The class was armed with one 4-inch (102-mm) Quick Firing Mk.XIX High Angle/Low Angle combined air/surface gun, two twin 20 mm anti-aircraft cannons and up to six single 20 mm anti-aircraft cannons for air/surface combat. For anti-submarine warfare, the ships were equipped with one Squid anti-submarine mortar and one depth charge rail with 15 depth charges.

== Construction and career ==
Rising Castle was ordered on 23 January 1943. She was built by Harland & Wolff, Belfast and laid down on 21 June 1943. She was launched on 8 February 1944, but was then transferred to the Royal Canadian Navy and commissioned as HMCS Arnprior (with a new pennant number) on 8 June 1944. She was then completed on 26 June 1944. The Canadian Castle-class corvettes were acquired from the Royal Navy in exchange for Algerine-class minesweepers.

=== War service ===
She worked up at Tobermory, after which she was assigned to the Mid-Ocean Escort Force as part of the convoy escort group C-1, based at Derry. She sailed with convoy ONM-249 on 19 August 1944. She spent the rest of the war serving in the Battle of the Atlantic as a convoy escort. After the end of the war in June 1945, Arnprior was refitted at St. John's, Newfoundland and Labrador. The refit lasted for two months and she was then based at Halifax.

=== Postwar service ===
She was decommissioned on 14 March 1946 and was sold to Uruguay. The ship was renamed Montevideo and operated as a training ship until 1975. The ship was broken up in 1975.
