= HMS Knaresborough Castle =

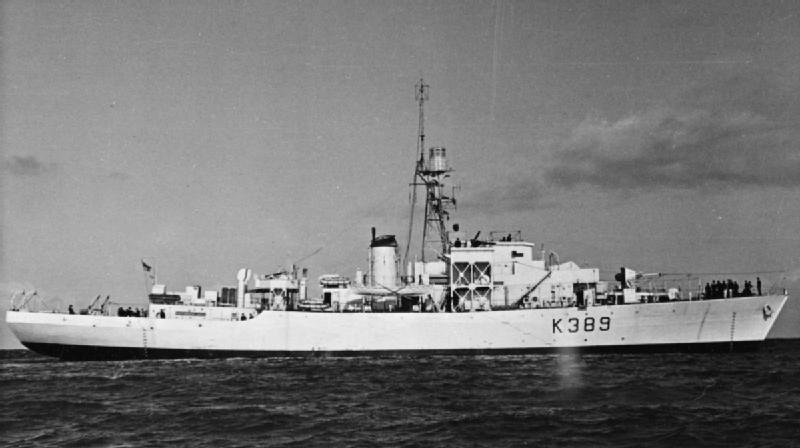
- Knaresborough Castle

History

United Kingdom
- Name: Knaresborough Castle
- Namesake: Knaresborough Castle
- Ordered: 19 January 1943
- Launched: 29 September 1943
- Identification: Pennant number: K389
- Fate: Scrapped, 16 March 1956

General characteristics (as built)
- Class & type: Castle-class corvette
- Displacement: 1,010 long tons (1,030 t) (standard)
- Length: 252 ft (76.8 m)
- Beam: 33 ft (10.1 m)
- Draught: 13 ft 9 in (4.2 m) (deep load)
- Installed power: 2 Admiralty 3-drum boilers; 2,880 ihp (2,150 kW)
- Propulsion: 1 shaft, 1 triple-expansion engine
- Speed: 16.5 knots (30.6 km/h; 19.0 mph)
- Range: 6,500 nmi (12,000 km; 7,500 mi) at 15 knots (28 km/h; 17 mph)
- Complement: 99
- Sensors & processing systems: Type 145 and Type 147 ASDIC; Type 272 search radar; HF/DF radio direction finder
- Armament: 1 × QF 4 in (102 mm) DP gun; 2 × twin, 2 × single 20 mm (0.8 in) AA guns; 1 × 3-barrel Squid anti-submarine mortar; 1 × depth charge rail and 2 throwers; 15 depth charges

HMS Knaresborough Castle (K389) was a Castle-class corvette built for the Royal Navy during the Second World War. Completed in 1944, the ship escorted 16 convoys between the UK and Gibraltar before the surrender of Germany in May 1945. She was then assigned air-sea rescue duties at Gibraltar and Freetown until her return to British waters in early 1946. Knaresborough Castle was reduced to reserve upon her arrival. The ship was reactivated and became a training ship in 1952. She returned to reserve two years later and was sold for scrap in 1956.

== Design and description ==
The Castle-class corvette was a stretched version of the preceding Flower class, enlarged to improve seakeeping and to accommodate modern weapons. The ships displaced 1,010 long tons (1,030 t) at standard load and 1,510 long tons (1,530 t) at deep load. The ships had an overall length of 252 feet (76.8 m), a beam of 36 feet 9 inches (11.2 m) and a deep draught of 13 feet 9 inches (4.2 m). They were powered by a four-cylinder triple-expansion steam engine driving one propeller shaft using steam provided by two Admiralty three-drum boilers. The engine developed a total of 2,880 indicated horsepower (2,150 kW) and gave a speed of 16.5 knots (30.6 km/h; 19.0 mph). The Castles carried enough fuel oil to give them a range of 6,500 nautical miles (12,000 km; 7,500 mi) at 15 knots (28 km/h; 17 mph). The ships' complement was 99 officers and ratings.

The Castle-class ships were equipped with a single QF 4-inch (102 mm) Mk XVI dual-purpose gun forward, but their primary weapon was their single three-barrel Squid anti-submarine mortar. This was backed up by one depth charge rail and two throwers for 15 depth charges. The ships were fitted with two twin and a pair of single mounts for 20-millimetre (0.8 in) Oerlikon AA guns. Provision was made for a further four single mounts if needed. They were equipped with Type 145Q and Type 147B ASDIC sets to detect submarines by reflections from sound waves beamed into the water. A Type 272 search radar and a HF/DF radio direction finder rounded out the Castles' sensor suite.

== Construction and career ==
Knaresborough Castle was ordered on 19 January 1943, laid down at Blyth Dry Dock in Blyth, Northumberland, on 22 April, launched on 28 September 1943 and completed on 5 April 1944. After several weeks of training at Western Approaches Command's Anti-Submarine Training School at Tobermory, Mull, the ship joined Escort Group B3 on the UK-Gibraltar run. On 18–19 October, Knaresborough Castle and her sister ship, Allington Castle rescued some of the crew of LCT 488 before it capsized. The ship was refitted at Ardrossan two months later. Upon its completion, she received refresher training at Tobermory for several weeks and was then assigned to the Liverpool Escort Pool. Knaresborough Castle finished the last of her 16 convoys on 27 May 1945. She returned to Gibraltar at the end of June to begin her air-sea rescue assignment. The ship arrived at Freetown on 12 November with the same assignment. The corvette returned to Harwich on 27 January 1946 and was reduced to reserve upon her arrival. Knaresborough Castle completed a refit at Grimsby on 27 August 1949 and returned to reserve. The ship was activated in September 1952 and briefly refitted for service with Plymouth Command as an air training target ship. She took part in the Fleet Review to celebrate the Coronation of Queen Elizabeth II. Knaresborough Castle completed a refit on 15 February 1954 and returned to reserve in July. The ship was sold for scrap in 1956 and arrived at Port Glasgow on 16 March to begin demolition.

== Bibliography ==
- Campbell, N. J. M. (1980). "Great Britain (including Empire Forces)". In Chesneau, Roger (ed.). Conway's All the World's Fighting Ships 1922–1946. Conway Maritime Press. pp. 2–85. ISBN 0-85177-146-7.
- Colledge, J. J.; Warlow, Ben & Bush, Steve (2020). Ships of the Royal Navy: The Complete Record of all Fighting Ships of the Royal Navy from the 15th Century to the Present (5th revised and updated ed.). Seaforth Publishing. ISBN 978-1-5267-9327-0.
- Goodwin, Norman; compiled by (2007). Castle Class Corvettes: An Account of the Service of the Ships and of Their Ships' Companies. Maritime Books. ISBN 978-1-904459-27-9.
- Lenton, H. T. (1998). British & Empire Warships of the Second World War. Naval Institute Press. ISBN 1-55750-048-7.
