= HMS Shrewsbury Castle =

Coordinates: 70°43′42″N 30°7′48″E

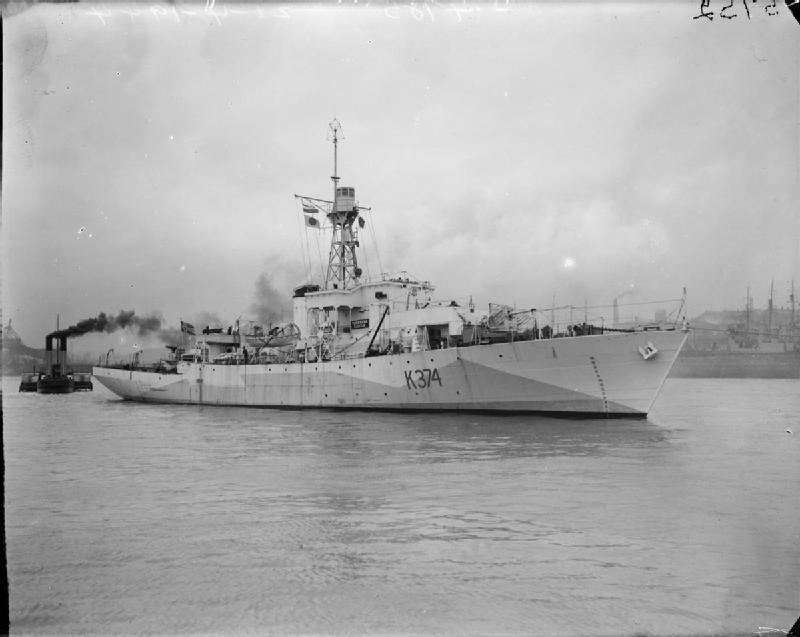
- HMS Shrewsbury Castle in 1943.

History

United Kingdom
- Name: Shrewsbury Castle
- Namesake: Shrewsbury Castle
- Ordered: 6 February 1943
- Builder: Swan Hunter, Wallsend
- Laid down: 5 May 1943
- Launched: 16 August 1944
- Identification: Pennant number: K374
- Fate: Loaned to Royal Norwegian Navy, 1944

History

Norway
- Name: Tunsberg Castle
- Namesake: Tunsberg Castle
- Builder: Swan Hunter, Wallsend
- Commissioned: 17 April 1944
- Fate: Sunk by mine, 12 December 1944

General characteristics
- Class & type: Castle-class corvette
- Displacement: 1,010 long tons (1,030 t) (standard); 1,510 long tons (1,530 t) (deep load)
- Length: 252 ft (76.8 m)
- Beam: 33 ft (10.1 m)
- Draught: 14 ft (4.3 m)
- Installed power: 2 Admiralty 3-drum boilers; 2,880 ihp (2,150 kW)
- Propulsion: 2 shafts, 2 geared steam turbines
- Speed: 16.5 knots (30.6 km/h; 19.0 mph)
- Range: 6,500 nmi (12,000 km; 7,500 mi) at 15 knots (28 km/h; 17 mph)
- Complement: 99
- Sensors & processing systems: Type 145 and Type 147 ASDIC; Type 277 search radar; HF/DF radio direction finder
- Armament: 1 × single 4 in (102 mm) gun; 2 × twin, 2 × single 20 mm (0.8 in) AA guns; 1 × 3-barrel Squid anti-submarine mortar; 15 × depth charges, 1 rack and 2 throwers

HMS Shrewsbury Castle was one of 44 Castle-class corvette built for the Royal Navy during the Second World War. She was named after Shrewsbury Castle in Shrewsbury. Completed in 1944, she was loaned to the Royal Norwegian Navy as a convoy escort during the war, renamed HNoMS Tunsberg Castle and was sunk by a mine in December 1944.

== Design and description ==
The Castle-class corvette was a stretched version of the preceding Flower class, enlarged to improve seakeeping and to accommodate modern weapons. The ships displaced 1,010 long tons (1,030 t) at standard load and 1,510 long tons (1,530 t) at deep load. They had an overall length of 252 feet (76.8 m), a beam of 36 feet 9 inches (11.2 m) and a deep draught of 14 feet (4.3 m). They were powered by a pair of triple-expansion steam engines, each driving one propeller shaft using steam provided by two Admiralty three-drum boilers. The engines developed a total of 2,880 indicated horsepower (2,150 kW) and gave a maximum speed of 16.5 knots (30.6 km/h; 19.0 mph). The Castles carried enough fuel oil to give them a range of 6,500 nautical miles (12,000 km; 7,500 mi) at 15 knots (28 km/h; 17 mph). The ships' complement was 99 officers and ratings.

The Castle-class ships were equipped with a single QF 4-inch (102 mm) Mk XVI gun forward, but their primary weapon was their single three-barrel Squid anti-submarine mortar. This was backed up by one depth charge rail and two throwers for 15 depth charges. The ships were fitted with two twin and a pair of single mounts for 20-millimetre (0.8 in) Oerlikon light AA guns. Provision was made for a further four single mounts if needed. They were equipped with Type 145Q and Type 147B ASDIC sets to detect submarines by reflections from sound waves beamed into the water. A Type 277 search radar and a HF/DF radio direction finder rounded out the Castles' sensor suite.

== Construction and career ==
Shrewsbury Castle was laid down by Swan Hunter at their shipyard at Wallsend, on 5 May 1943 and launched on 16 August 1944. She was completed in April and served as a convoy escort.

Shrewsbury Castle was loaned to the Royal Norwegian Navy and renamed HNoMS Tunsberg Castle, her namesake was from Tunsberg Castle on 17 April 1944. On 12 December 1944, she hit a mine and sank with 5 crew members on board.
