= HMS Amberley Castle =

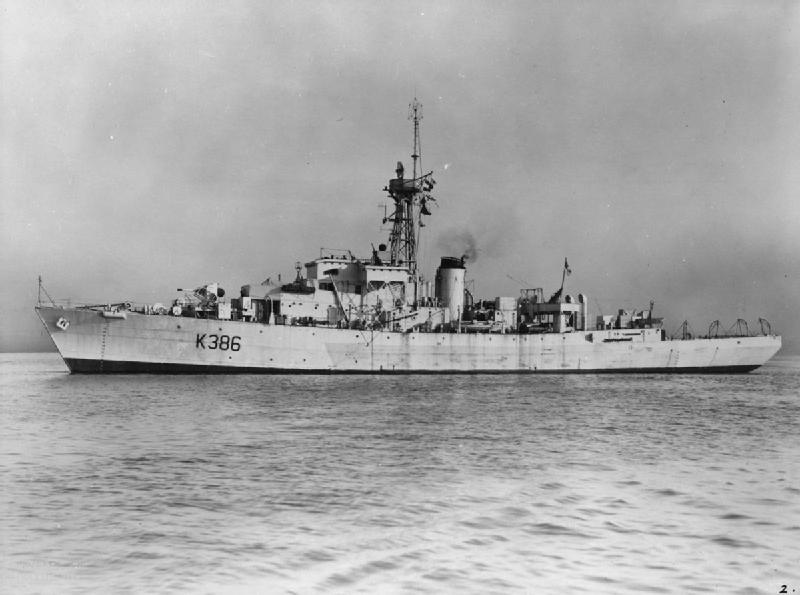
- Amberley Castle in January 1945

History

United Kingdom
- Name: Amberley Castle
- Namesake: Amberley Castle
- Laid down: 31 May 1943
- Launched: 27 November 1943
- Commissioned: 24 November 1944
- Renamed: Weather Advisor, 22 September 1960; Admiral Fitzroy, 1977
- Reclassified: As weather ship, 1959
- Identification: Pennant number: K386
- Fate: Sold for scrapped, 1982

General characteristics (as built)
- Class & type: Castle-class corvette
- Displacement: 1,010 long tons (1,030 t) (standard)
- Length: 252 ft (76.8 m)
- Beam: 33 ft (10.1 m)
- Draught: 13 ft 9 in (4.2 m) (deep load)
- Installed power: 2 Admiralty 3-drum boilers; 2,880 ihp (2,150 kW)
- Propulsion: 1 shaft, 1 triple-expansion engine
- Speed: 16.5 knots (30.6 km/h; 19.0 mph)
- Range: 6,500 nmi (12,000 km; 7,500 mi) at 15 knots (28 km/h; 17 mph)
- Complement: 99
- Sensors & processing systems: Type 145 and Type 147 ASDIC; Type 272 search radar; HF/DF radio direction finder
- Armament: 1 × QF 4 in (102 mm) DP gun; 2 × twin, 2 × single 20 mm (0.8 in) AA guns; 1 × 3-barrel Squid anti-submarine mortar; 1 × depth charge rail and 2 throwers; 15 depth charges

HMS Amberley Castle (K386) was a Castle-class corvette built for the United Kingdom's Royal Navy during the Second World War. Completed in late 1944, the ship spent the rest of the war escorting 11 convoys between the UK and Gibraltar. After the surrender of German in May 1945, she was assigned air-sea rescue duties until early 1946 when Amberley Castle was reduced to reserve. She was converted into a weather ship in 1959 and subsequently renamed Weather Advisor. The ship was renamed Admiral Fitzroy in 1977 before she was sold for scrap in 1982.

== Design and description ==
The Castle-class corvette was a stretched version of the preceding Flower class, enlarged to improve seakeeping and to accommodate modern weapons. The ships displaced 1,010 long tons (1,030 t) at standard load and 1,510 long tons (1,530 t) at deep load. The ships had an overall length of 252 feet (76.8 m), a beam of 36 feet 9 inches (11.2 m) and a deep draught of 13 feet 9 inches (4.2 m). They were powered by a four-cylinder triple-expansion steam engine driving one propeller shaft using steam provided by two Admiralty three-drum boilers. The engine developed a total of 2,880 indicated horsepower (2,150 kW) and gave a speed of 16.5 knots (30.6 km/h; 19.0 mph). The Castles carried enough fuel oil to give them a range of 6,500 nautical miles (12,000 km; 7,500 mi) at 15 knots (28 km/h; 17 mph). The ships' complement was 99 officers and ratings.

The Castle-class ships were equipped with a single QF 4-inch (102 mm) Mk XVI dual-purpose gun forward, but their primary weapon was their single three-barrel Squid anti-submarine mortar. This was backed up by one depth charge rail and two throwers for 15 depth charges. The ships were fitted with two twin and a pair of single mounts for 20-millimetre (0.8 in) Oerlikon AA guns. Provision was made for a further four single mounts if needed. They were equipped with Type 145Q and Type 147B ASDIC sets to detect submarines by reflections from sound waves beamed into the water. A Type 272 search radar and a HF/DF radio direction finder rounded out the Castles' sensor suite.

== Construction and career ==
Amberley Castle was ordered on 23 January 1943 and was laid down by S.P. Austin & Son at their shipyard in Sunderland on 31 May. The ship was launched on 27 November, and completed on 24 November 1944. After several weeks of training in Western Approaches Command's Anti-Submarine Training School at Tobermory, Mull, she joined the Liverpool Escort Pool on 22 December. By the time that Germany surrendered in May 1945, Amberley Castle had escorted 11 convoys between the UK and Gibraltar. She was assigned air-sea rescue duties from late May until February 1946. The ship was put into reserve at Portsmouth until 1952 and was transferred to Penarth in 1953.

=== Weather ship ===
Oxford Castle was converted to a weather ship at Blyth, Northumberland in 1959–1960 and renamed to Weather Advisor in a ceremony on 22 September 1960 at the James Watt Dock, Greenock by Lady Sutton, wife of Sir Graham Sutton, the then director-general of the Met Office. She replaced the ship known as Weather Observer, which had carried out the role since 1947. The ship was scrapped at Troon in 1982.

== Bibliography ==
- Campbell, N. J. M. (1980). "Great Britain (including Empire Forces)". In Chesneau, Roger (ed.). Conway's All the World's Fighting Ships 1922–1946. Conway Maritime Press. pp. 2–85. ISBN 0-85177-146-7.
- Colledge, J. J.; Warlow, Ben & Bush, Steve (2020). Ships of the Royal Navy: The Complete Record of all Fighting Ships of the Royal Navy from the 15th Century to the Present (5th revised and updated ed.). Seaforth Publishing. ISBN 978-1-5267-9327-0.
- Goodwin, Norman; compiled by (2007). Castle Class Corvettes: An Account of the Service of the Ships and of Their Ships' Companies. Maritime Books. ISBN 978-1-904459-27-9.
- Lenton, H. T. (1998). British & Empire Warships of the Second World War. Naval Institute Press. ISBN 1-55750-048-7.
