= HMS Woolvesey Castle =

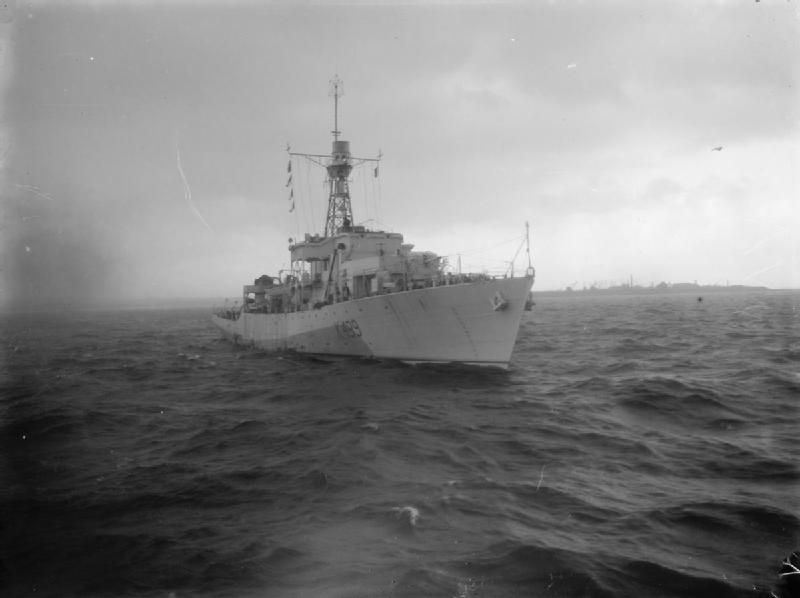
- As HMCS Huntsville

History

United Kingdom
- Name: Woolvesey Castle
- Namesake: Wolvesey Castle
- Ordered: 23 January 1943
- Builder: Ailsa Shipbuilding Co. Ltd., Troon
- Laid down: 1 June 1943
- Launched: 24 February 1944
- Identification: Pennant number: K461
- Fate: Transferred to the Royal Canadian Navy

Canada
- Name: Huntsville
- Namesake: Huntsville, Ontario
- Acquired: 1943
- Commissioned: 6 June 1944
- Decommissioned: 15 February 1945
- Identification: Pennant number: K497
- Honours and awards: Atlantic 1944–45
- Fate: Sold for mercantile service 1946
- Name: SS Wellington Kent (1947); Belle Isle II (1951)
- In service: 1947
- Out of service: 19 August 1960
- Fate: Sunk in collision, 19 August 1960

General characteristics (as built)
- Type: Castle-class corvette
- Displacement: 1,060 long tons (1,077 t)
- Length: 252 ft (77 m)
- Beam: 36 ft 8 in (11.18 m)
- Draught: 13 ft 6 in (4.11 m)
- Installed power: 2 × water-tube boilers; 2,750 ihp (2,050 kW)
- Propulsion: 1 × 4-cylinder triple-expansion steam engine; Single screw
- Speed: 16.5 knots (30.6 km/h; 19.0 mph)
- Range: 6,200 nmi (11,500 km) at 15 kn (28 km/h; 17 mph)
- Complement: 120
- Sensors & processing systems: Type 272 radar; Type 145 sonar; Type 147B sonar
- Armament: 1 × QF 4-inch Mk XIX gun; 1 × Squid anti-submarine mortar; 1 × Depth charge rail, 15 depth charges; 4–10 × 20 mm anti-aircraft cannon

HMS Woolvesey Castle, also spelled as Wolvesey Castle, was a Castle-class corvette constructed for the British Royal Navy during the Second World War. Before completion, the ship was transferred to the Royal Canadian Navy and was renamed HMCS Huntsville. Huntsville spent the rest of the war as a convoy escort. Following the war, the ship was converted for mercantile use and entered service as SS Wellington Kent in 1947. In 1951, the ship was renamed Belle Isle II. In 1960, Belle Isle II was sunk in a collision.

== Design and description ==
The Castle class were an improved corvette design over their predecessor Flower class. The Flower class was not considered acceptable for mid-Atlantic sailing and was only used on Atlantic convoy duty out of need. Though the Admiralty would have preferred Loch-class frigates, the inability of many small shipyards to construct the larger ships required them to come up with a smaller vessel. The increased length of the Castle class over their predecessors and their improved hull form gave the Castles better speed and performance on patrol in the North Atlantic and an acceptable replacement for the Flowers. This, coupled with improved anti-submarine armament in the form of the Squid mortar led to a much more capable anti-submarine warfare (ASW) vessel. However, the design did have criticisms, mainly in the way it handled at low speeds and that the class's maximum speed was already slower than the speeds of the new U-boats they would be facing.

A Castle-class corvette was 252 feet (77 m) long with a beam of 36 feet 8 inches (11.18 m) and a draught of 13 feet 6 inches (4.11 m) at deep load. (Note: Brown states the beam at 36.5 feet (11.1 m) and the draught at 13.5 feet (4.1 m)) The ships displaced 1,060 long tons (1,077 t) standard and 1,580 long tons (1,605 t) deep load. (Note: Chesneau states the displacement at deep load as 1,590–1,630 long tons (1,616–1,656 t)) The ships had a complement of 120. (Note: Brown states the complement as 99 and Johnston states the complement of Canadian ships at 112 (7 officers and 105 ratings).)

The ships were powered by two Admiralty three-drum boilers which created 2,750 indicated horsepower (2,050 kW). This powered one vertical triple expansion engine that drove one shaft, giving the ships a maximum speed of 16.5 knots (30.6 km/h; 19.0 mph). The ships carried 480 tons of oil giving them a range of 6,200 nautical miles (11,500 km; 7,100 mi) at 15 knots (28 km/h; 17 mph).

The corvettes were armed with one QF 4-inch Mk XIX gun mounted forward. (Note: Mk XIX = Mark 19. Britain used Roman numerals to denote Marks (models) of ordnance until after World War II. This was the nineteenth model of British QF 4-inch gun) Anti-air armament varied from 4 to 10 Oerlikon 20 mm cannons. For ASW purposes, the ships were equipped with one three-barreled Squid anti-submarine mortar with 81 projectiles. The ships also had two depth charge throwers and one depth charge rail on the stern that came with 15 depth charges.

The ships were equipped with Type 145 and Type 147B ASDIC. The Type 147B was tied to the Squid anti-submarine mortar and would automatically set the depth on the fuses of the projectiles until the moment of firing. A single Squid-launched attack had a success rate of 25%. The class was also provided with HF/DF and Type 277 radar.

== Construction and career ==
Woolvesey Castle, named after a castle in Winchester, was ordered on 23 January 1943. The ship was laid down on 1 June 1943 by Ailsa Shipbuilding Co. Ltd. at Troon and was launched on 24 February 1944. At some point during 1943 the ship was transferred to the Royal Canadian Navy. Renamed Huntsville after a community in northern Ontario, the corvette was commissioned on 6 June 1944 with the pennant number K499.

Following her commissioning, Huntsville was sent to Stornoway to work up and joined the Mid-Ocean Escort Force escort group C-5 as a convoy escort. In November, Huntsville was in Halifax, Nova Scotia under repair when her group sailed without her. She was then ordered to act as a local escort, protecting a convoy travelling from St. John's to New York City. The corvette then returned to ocean-crossing convoys in December and continued in this fashion until May 1945.

In May 1945, Huntsville underwent a refit at Halifax which was completed in August and was placed in reserve the following month. The ship was paid off on 15 February 1946 and sold later that year for mercantile use. Converted to a cargo ship with a gross register tonnage of 1,529 tons, the ship was initially owned by the Kent Line and had a port of registry in St. John's. In 1947 the ship entered service as SS Wellington Kent. In 1951, the ship was sold to Chebucto Steamships Ltd and renamed Belle Isle II. Her port of registry also changed to Halifax. On 19 August 1960, Belle Isle II was sunk in a collision off Trois-Rivières, Quebec.

Belle Isle II was hit by the merchant vessel Holmside on Lake Saint Pierre while at anchor. The ship caught fire after the collision which gutted the ship. No casualties were involved, however the ship was a constructive total loss and was later salvaged by towing the hulk to Portsmouth, Ontario on 2 November. The ship was broken up at Whitby, Ontario in 1965–66. (Note: Miramar claims the ship was broken up at Sorel, Quebec in May 1964.)
