= HMS Hurst Castle =

British castle-class corvettes

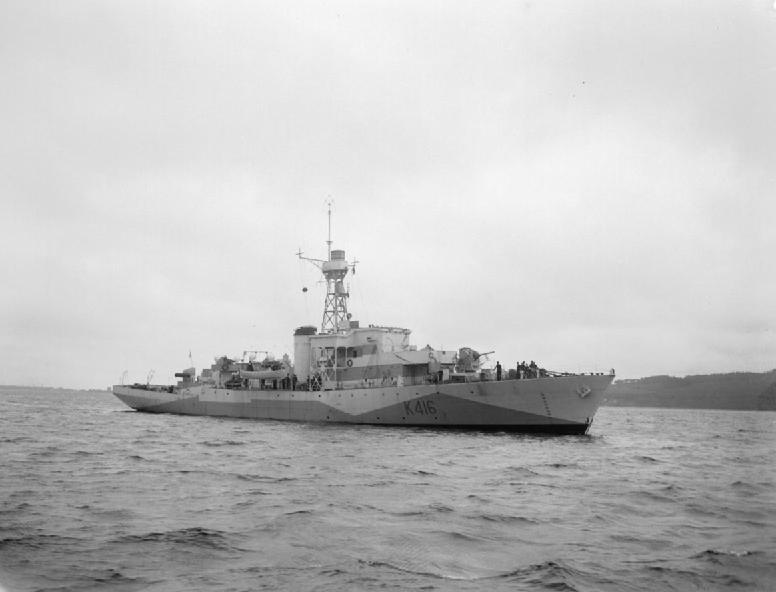
- Hurst Castle underway in the Firth of Tay on completion

History

United Kingdom
- Name: Hurst Castle
- Namesake: Hurst Castle
- Ordered: 2 February 1943
- Builder: Caledon Shipbuilding & Engineering Company, Dundee
- Laid down: 6 August 1943
- Launched: 23 February 1944
- Completed: 9 June 1944
- Fate: Sunk, 1 September 1944

General characteristics
- Class & type: Castle-class corvette
- Displacement: 1,010 long tons (1,030 t) (standard); 1,510 long tons (1,530 t) (deep load)
- Length: 252 ft (76.8 m)
- Beam: 36 ft 9 in (11.2 m)
- Draught: 14 ft (4.3 m)
- Installed power: 2 Admiralty 3-drum boilers; 2,880 ihp (2,150 kW)
- Propulsion: 2 shafts, 2 geared steam turbines
- Speed: 16.5 knots (30.6 km/h; 19.0 mph)
- Range: 6,500 nmi (12,000 km; 7,500 mi) at 15 knots (28 km/h; 17 mph)
- Complement: 99
- Sensors & processing systems: Type 145 and Type 147 ASDIC; Type 277 search radar; HF/DF radio direction finder
- Armament: 1 × single 4 in (102 mm) gun; 2 × twin, 2 × single 20 mm (0.8 in) AA guns; 1 × 3-barrel Squid anti-submarine mortar; 1 rail and 2 throwers for 15 depth charges

HMS Hurst Castle (K416) was one of 44 Castle-class corvettes built for the Royal Navy during World War II. Completed in June 1944, she began escorting convoys in August and was sunk by a German U-boat the following month.

== Design and description ==
The Castle-class corvette was a stretched version of the preceding Flower class, enlarged to improve seakeeping and to accommodate modern weapons. The ships displaced 1,010 long tons (1,030 t) at standard load and 1,510 long tons (1,530 t) at deep load. They had an overall length of 252 feet (76.8 m), a beam of 36 feet 9 inches (11.2 m) and a deep draught of 14 feet (4.3 m). They were powered by a pair of triple-expansion steam engines, each driving one propeller shaft using steam provided by two Admiralty three-drum boilers. The engines developed a total of 2,880 indicated horsepower (2,150 kW) and gave a maximum speed of 16.5 knots (30.6 km/h; 19.0 mph). The Castles carried enough fuel oil to give them a range of 6,500 nautical miles (12,000 km; 7,500 mi) at 15 knots (28 km/h; 17 mph). The ships' complement was 99 officers and ratings.

The Castle-class ships were equipped with a single QF 4-inch (102 mm) Mk XVI gun forward, but their primary weapon was their single three-barrel Squid anti-submarine mortar. This was backed up by one depth charge rail and two throwers for 15 depth charges. The ships were fitted with two twin and a pair of single mounts for 20-millimetre (0.8 in) Oerlikon light AA guns. Provision was made for a further four single mounts if needed. They were equipped with Type 145Q and Type 147B ASDIC sets to detect submarines by reflections from sound waves beamed into the water. A Type 277 search radar and a HF/DF radio direction finder rounded out the Castles' sensor suite.

== Construction and career ==
Hurst Castle, the only ship of her name to serve in the Royal Navy, was ordered on 2 February 1943 from Caledon Shipbuilding & Engineering Company and was laid down at their shipyard in Dundee on 6 August. She was launched on 23 February 1944 and was completed on 9 June. The ship sailed to the anti-submarine training base in Tobermory, Mull, HMS Western Isles, for working up. Hurst Castle was assigned to Escort Group B3 on 3 July and escorted Convoy OS 85/KMS 59 from Britain to Gibraltar on 2 August. The group escorted Convoy SL 167/MKS 58 from Gibraltar to the UK later that month.

On 30 August Hurst Castle and her sister ship Oxford Castle departed Derry, Northern Ireland, to rendezvous with Force 33 the following day. After meeting up with the other ships, they were tasked to search for the German submarine U-482 which had been spotted by a Royal Air Force Consolidated B-24 Liberator patrol aircraft on the morning of 1 September. At 08:25, Hurst Castle was struck port side aft by a torpedo fired by the submarine; the ship sank in six minutes at 55°35′N 8°11′W with the loss of 17 ratings. The escort destroyer Ambuscade rescued all 102 survivors.

== Bibliography ==
- Chesneau, Roger, ed. (1980). Conway's All the World's Fighting Ships 1922–1946. Greenwich, UK: Conway Maritime Press. ISBN 0-85177-146-7.
- Colledge, J. J.; Warlow, Ben (2006) [1969]. Ships of the Royal Navy: The Complete Record of All Fighting Ships of the Royal Navy from the 15th Century to the Present (3rd Rev ed.). London: Chatham Publishing. ISBN 978-1-86176-281-8. OCLC 67375475.
- Goodwin, Norman (2007). Castle Class Corvettes: An Account of the Service of the Ships and of Their Ships' Companies. Liskeard, UK: Maritime Books. ISBN 978-1-904459-27-9.
- Lenton, H. T. (1998). British & Empire Warships of the Second World War. Annapolis, Maryland: Naval Institute Press. ISBN 1-55750-048-7.
- Rohwer, Jürgen (2005). Chronology of the War at Sea 1939–1945: The Naval History of World War Two (Third Revised ed.). Annapolis, Maryland: Naval Institute Press. ISBN 1-59114-119-2.
