= HMS Leeds Castle (K384) =

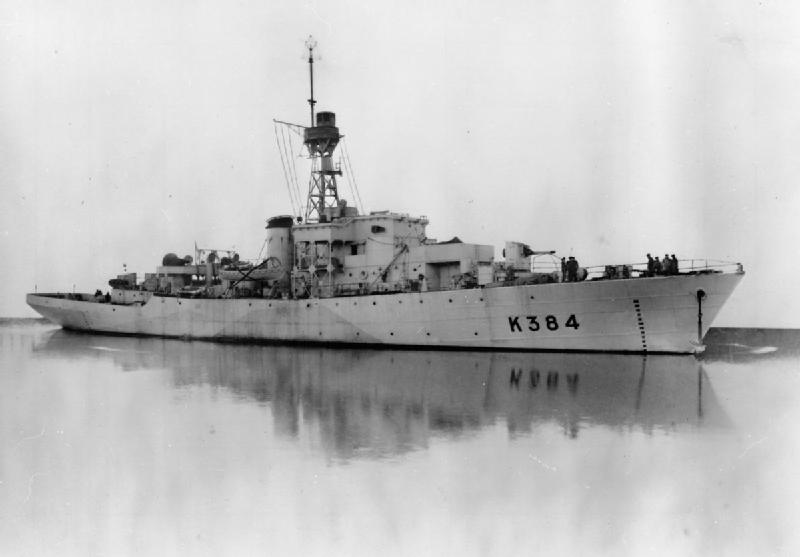
- Leeds Castle in April 1944

History

United Kingdom
- Name: HMS Leeds Castle
- Builder: William Pickersgill & Sons
- Launched: 12 October 1943
- Commissioned: February 1944
- Decommissioned: November 1956
- Identification: Pennant number: K384 & F384
- Fate: Scrapped, 1958

General characteristics (as built)
- Class & type: Castle-class corvette
- Displacement: 1,010 long tons (1,030 t) (standard)
- Length: 252 ft (76.8 m)
- Beam: 33 ft (10.1 m)
- Draught: 13 ft 9 in (4.2 m) (deep load)
- Installed power: 2 Admiralty 3-drum boilers; 2,880 ihp (2,150 kW)
- Propulsion: 1 shaft, 1 triple-expansion engine
- Speed: 16.5 knots (30.6 km/h; 19.0 mph)
- Range: 6,500 nmi (12,000 km; 7,500 mi) at 15 knots (28 km/h; 17 mph)
- Complement: 99
- Sensors & processing systems: Type 145 and Type 147 ASDIC; Type 272 search radar; HF/DF radio direction finder
- Armament: 1 × QF 4 in (102 mm) DP gun; 2 × twin, 2 × single 20 mm (0.8 in) AA guns; 1 × 3-barrel Squid anti-submarine mortar; 1 × depth charge rail and 2 throwers; 15 depth charges

HMS Leeds Castle was a Castle-class corvette of the Royal Navy built for the Royal Navy during the Second World War. Completed in 1944, she escorted 16 convoys to and from the UK and Gibraltar for the rest of the war. The ship was then assigned air-sea rescue duties in British waters until January 1946. Later that year Leeds Castle became a training ship and served in that role until 1956 when she was reduced to reserve. The ship was sold for scrap in 1958 and was subsequently broken up.

== Design and description ==
The Castle-class corvette was a stretched version of the preceding Flower class, enlarged to improve seakeeping and to accommodate modern weapons. The ships displaced 1,010 long tons (1,030 t) at standard load and 1,510 long tons (1,530 t) at deep load. The ships had an overall length of 252 feet (76.8 m), a beam of 36 feet 9 inches (11.2 m) and a deep draught of 13 feet 9 inches (4.2 m). They were powered by a four-cylinder triple-expansion steam engine driving one propeller shaft using steam provided by two Admiralty three-drum boilers. The engine developed a total of 2,880 indicated horsepower (2,150 kW) and gave a speed of 16.5 knots (30.6 km/h; 19.0 mph). The Castles carried enough fuel oil to give them a range of 6,500 nautical miles (12,000 km; 7,500 mi) at 15 knots (28 km/h; 17 mph). The ships' complement was 99 officers and ratings.

The Castle-class ships were equipped with a single QF 4-inch (102 mm) Mk XVI dual-purpose gun forward, but their primary weapon was their single three-barrel Squid anti-submarine mortar. This was backed up by one depth charge rail and two throwers for 15 depth charges. The ships were fitted with two twin and a pair of single mounts for 20-millimetre (0.8 in) Oerlikon AA guns. Provision was made for a further four single mounts if needed. They were equipped with Type 145Q and Type 147B ASDIC sets to detect submarines by reflections from sound waves beamed into the water. A Type 272 search radar and a HF/DF radio direction finder rounded out the Castles' sensor suite.

== Construction and career ==
Leeds Castle was ordered on 23 January 1943 and was laid down at William Pickersgill & Sons at their shipyard in Sunderland on 22 April. The ship was launched on 12 October and completed on 15 February 1944. After several weeks of training in Western Approaches Command's Anti-Submarine Training School at Tobermory, Mull, she was assigned to Escort Group B3 on the Gibraltar-UK run. Leeds Castle was transferred to the B23 Escort Group in September and then the Liverpool Escort Pool, but remained on the same route for the rest of the war. The ship was refitted at Cardiff between 18 January and 7 April 1945 and made one more round trip in May after Germany surrendered on 8 May. She was then tasked with the air-sea rescue mission in British waters in mid-June. Leeds Castle ran aground on Pladda Island on 10 October and had to be beached to prevent her from sinking. She was refloated and towed to Ardrossan where her repairs lasted until 27 December.

The ship was then assigned to the Anti-Submarine Training Squadron at Portland Harbour, and continued in this role until she was paid off at HM Dockyard, Chatham, in November 1956, after serving a total of 12 1/2 years. Leeds Castle was refitted in December 1949–January 1950 at Chatham and ran aground on a mud bank in a fog on 13 January after the refit had been completed. The ship was refloated after ammunition and supplies were unloaded. In 1953 she took part in the Fleet Review to celebrate the Coronation of Queen Elizabeth II. The ship was sold for scrap to Thos. W. Ward in 1958 and arrived at Grays on 5 May 1958 to begin demolition.

== Bibliography ==
- Campbell, N. J. M. (1980). "Great Britain (including Empire Forces)". In Chesneau, Roger (ed.). Conway's All the World's Fighting Ships 1922–1946. Conway Maritime Press. pp. 2–85. ISBN 0-85177-146-7.
- Colledge, J. J.; Warlow, Ben & Bush, Steve (2020). Ships of the Royal Navy: The Complete Record of all Fighting Ships of the Royal Navy from the 15th Century to the Present (5th revised and updated ed.). Seaforth Publishing. ISBN 978-1-5267-9327-0.
- Goodwin, Norman; compiled by (2007). Castle Class Corvettes: An Account of the Service of the Ships and of Their Ships' Companies. Maritime Books. ISBN 978-1-904459-27-9.
- Lenton, H. T. (1998). British & Empire Warships of the Second World War. Naval Institute Press. ISBN 1-55750-048-7.
