= Castle-class corvette =

Corvettes of the Royal Navy

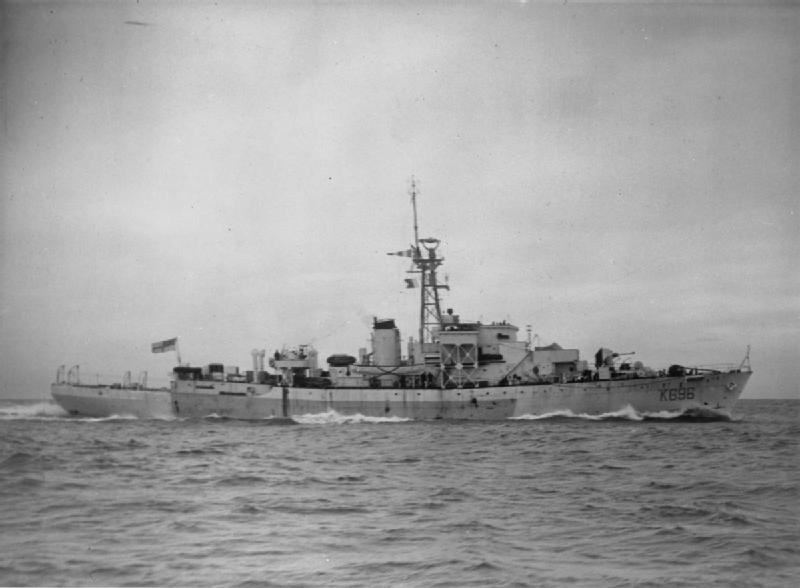
- Denbigh Castle

Class overview
- Name: Castle class
- Builders: Smiths Dock (5); Fleming and Ferguson (4); Harland and Wolff (4); William Pickersgill & Sons (3); Blyth Dry Dock (3); Caledon Shipbuilding & Eng. (3); Robbs (3); John Lewis and Sons (3); Swan Hunter (3); A and J Inglis (2); Ailsa Shipbuilding (2); George Brown & Co. (2); John Crown & Sons (2); Ferguson Shipbuilders (2); Barclay Curle (1); Ferguson Brothers (1); SP Austin & Son (1)
- Operators: Royal Navy; Royal Canadian Navy; Royal Norwegian Navy; Republic of China Navy; People's Liberation Army Navy
- Preceded by: Flower class
- Succeeded by: None
- Planned: 95
- Completed: 44
- Cancelled: 51
- Lost: 3
- Retired: 41

General characteristics
- Type: Corvette
- Displacement: 1,060 long tons (1,077 t)
- Length: 252 ft (76.8 m)
- Beam: 37 ft (11.3 m)
- Draught: 10 ft (3.0 m)
- Installed power: 2 × water-tube boilers; 2,750 ihp (2,050 kW)
- Propulsion: 1 screw; 1 triple-expansion steam engine
- Speed: 16.5 knots (30.6 km/h; 19.0 mph)
- Range: 9,500 nmi (17,600 km; 10,900 mi) at 10 knots (19 km/h; 12 mph)
- Complement: 112
- Sensors & processing systems: Type 272 radar; Type 144Q sonar; Type 147B sonar
- Armament: 1 × single 4 in (102 mm) DP gun; 1 × Squid anti-submarine mortar; 1 × depth charge rail, 15 depth charges; 2 × twin 20 mm (0.8 in) AA guns; Up to 6 × single 20 mm AA guns

The Castle-class corvette was an ocean going convoy escort developed by the United Kingdom during the Second World War. It was the follow-on to the Flower-class corvette, and designed to be built in shipyards that were producing the Flowers. The Castle-class was a general improvement over the smaller Flowers which were designed for coastal rather than open ocean use.

The Castle-class corvettes started appearing in service during late 1943.

== Background ==
In mid-1939, the Admiralty ordered 175 Flower-class corvettes for protecting shipping on the west coast of Britain as well as the Western Approaches. They were designed to be built in large numbers in small shipyards without propulsion and other components (mainly gearboxes, but also guns) then in short supply so not to compete with other warships for construction. By the time the Flowers began entering service in late-1940, due to their long range they were required to undertake missions beyond coastal waters. The Flowers were unsuited for open-ocean escort in the North Atlantic, especially in poor weather; they lacked speed, endurance, and habitability but became the mainstay of the Mid-Ocean Escort Force protecting convoys crossing the Atlantic.

The Royal Navy recognized the limitations of the Flower and began designing an open-ocean escort in November 1940, which became the River-class frigate. The larger Rivers were too expensive to produce at the required rate and needed larger slipways. The Loch-class frigate was developed in late-1942, which was derived from the River and designed for prefabricated construction. The Castle was developed from a proposal by Smith's Dock Company – who had designed the Flower-class – for a stretched Flower. The result was a smaller version of the Loch for shipyards that only built corvettes using mainly traditional methods.

The design was approved in May 1943 and 96 Castles were ordered from yards in the UK and Canada. Fifteen British and all 37 Canadian ships were later cancelled; Canada receiving twelve British-built ships instead. The UK completed a further five as convoy rescue ships for its Merchant Navy. Four became weather ships after the war.

== Design ==
The Castle resembled later Flowers with an extended forecastle and mast behind the bridge, but was 135 tons heavier and 47 feet longer. The Admiralty Experiment Works at Haslar developed an improved hull form which, in combination with the increased length, made the Castle at least half a knot faster than the Flower despite using the same engine. The Castle also had a single-screw. A lattice mainmast was used instead of the pole version fitted to the Flowers.

Construction used mainly traditional methods with as much welding as possible. Scantling was based on the Flower, but lightened in some areas. The wireless office (the same as on the Loch), the radar office, and the lattice mast were installed as prefabricated units.

The Castle was armed with a Squid anti-submarine mortar, directed by Type 145 and 147B ASDIC. The Flower used the older Hedgehog mortar and could not be fitted with Squid. The first operational Type 147 and Squid were installed aboard HMS Hadleigh Castle in September 1943.

In place of the BL 4-inch Mk IX main gun, the Castles had the new QF 4-inch Mk XIX gun on a High-Angle/Low-Angle mounting which could be used against aircraft as well as surface targets such as submarines.

== In service ==
The Castle was criticized for being barely fast enough to fight German Type VII submarines and difficult to handle at low speed.

== Ships ==
=== Royal Canadian Navy ===
The following vessels were all originally built for the Royal Navy, but were transferred to the RCN on completion (for details of builders and construction dates see under Royal Navy below). All their pennant numbers (except Hedingham Castle, which was never completed), as well as their names, were changed when transferred.

- HMCS Arnprior (K494) (ex-HMS Rising Castle)
- HMCS Bowmanville (K493) (ex-HMS Nunney Castle), sold to Republic of China as cargo ship, but taken over by the Communist People's Liberation Army Navy after the end of the Chinese Civil War and rearmed with Soviet guns, entering PLAN service as Guangzhou.
- HMCS Copper Cliff (K495) (ex-HMS Hever Castle)
- HMCS Hespeler (K489) (ex-HMS Guildford Castle) (later SS Chilcotin)
- HMCS Humberstone (K497) (ex-HMS Norham Castle)
- HMCS Huntsville (K499) (ex-HMS Woolvesey Castle)
- HMCS Kincardine (K490) (ex-HMS Tamworth Castle)
- HMCS Leaside (K492) (ex-HMS Walmer Castle, later SS Coquitlam II)
- HMCS Orangeville (K491) (ex-HMS Hedingham Castle), sold to Republic of China as cargo ship, but taken over by the ROC Navy on 29 June 1950 and rearmed with US guns, entering ROCN service as De An (德安)
- HMCS Petrolia (K498) (ex-HMS Sherborne Castle)
- HMCS St. Thomas (K488) (ex-HMS Sandgate Castle, later SS Camosun III)
- HMCS Tillsonburg (K496) (ex-HMS Pembroke Castle), sold to Republic of China as cargo ship, but taken over by ROCN on 29 June 1950 and rearmed with US guns, entering ROCN service as Kao An (高安)

=== Royal Navy ===
The first of the Castle-class were the prototypes Hadleigh Castle and Kenilworth Castle, ordered on 9 December 1942; another 12 vessels were also ordered on 9 December, also under the 1942 War Programme. The remaining eighty-one ships were all ordered for the RN under the 1943 War Programme, of which thirty were completed. Fifty-one of these ships (15 from UK shipyards and 36 from Canadian shipyards) were cancelled late in 1943.

Castle-class corvettes of the Royal Navy
Name	Pennant	Hull builder	Ordered	Laid down	Launched	Commissioned	Paid off	Fate
Hadleigh Castle	K355	Smiths Dock Company	9 Dec 1942	4 Apr 1943	21 Jun 1943	18 Sep 1943	Aug 1946	Scrapped, Jan 1959
Kenilworth Castle	K420	Smiths Dock Company	9 Dec 1942	7 May 1943	17 Aug 1943	22 Nov 1943	1948	Scrapped, 20 Jun 1959
Allington Castle	K689	Fleming & Ferguson	9 Dec 1942^{(a)}	22 Jul 1943	29 Feb 1944	19 June 1944	1947	Scrapped 1958
Bamborough Castle	K412	John Lewis & Co. Ltd	9 Dec 1942	1 Jul 1943	11 Jan 1944	30 May 1944	1950	Scrapped 22 May 1959
Caistor Castle	K690	John Lewis & Co. Ltd	9 Dec 1942	26 Aug 1943	22 May 1944	29 September 1944	1947	Scrapped Mar 1956
Denbigh Castle	K696	John Lewis & Co. Ltd	9 Dec 1942	30 Sep 1943	5 Aug 1944	30 December 1944		Declared constructive total loss, 13 Feb 1945
Farnham Castle	K413	John Crown & Sons Ltd	9 Dec 1942	25 Jun 1943	25 Apr 1944	31 Jan 1945	1947	Scrapped, 31 Oct 1960
Hedingham Castle	K529	John Crown & Sons Ltd	9 Dec 1942	2 Nov 1943	30 Oct 1944	12 May 1945	Aug 1945	Scrapped, Apr 1958
Lancaster Castle	K691	Fleming & Ferguson	9 Dec 1942	10 Sep 1943	14 Apr 1944	15 Sep 1944	1947	Scrapped, 20 Jun 1959
Maiden Castle	K443	Fleming & Ferguson	9 Dec 1942	1943	8 Jun 1944	November 1944		Became convoy rescue ship Empire Lifeguard before completion; Scrapped, 22 Jul 1955
Norham Castle (ex-Totnes Castle)	K447	A. & J. Inglis	9 Dec 1942	30 Sep 1943	12 Apr 1944	6 Sep 1944		Transferred to Canada as HMCS Humberstone 1944; Sold for mercantile service 1947
Oakham Castle	K530	A. & J. Inglis	9 Dec 1942	30 Sep 1943	20 Jul 1944	10 Dec 1944	1950	Became the weather ship Weather Reporter 1957
Pembroke Castle	K450	Ferguson Shipbuilders	9 Dec 1942	3 Jun 1943	12 Feb 1944	29 June 1944		Transferred to Canada as HMCS Tillsonburg in 1944; Sold for mercantile service 1947; Sold to Republic of China as Kao An 1952
Rayleigh Castle	K695	Ferguson Shipbuilders	9 Dec 1942	1943	12 Jun 1944	Oct 1944		Completed as convoy rescue ship Empire Rest
Alnwick Castle	K405	George Brown & Co.	19 Jan 1943	1943	3 Oct 1944		1957	Broken up Dec 1958
Barnard Castle	K594	George Brown & Co.		1943	3 Oct 1944			completed 1945 as convoy rescue ship Empire Shelter
Flint Castle	K383	Henry Robb, at Leith		20 Apr 1943	1 Sep 1943	31 Dec 1943	Mar 1956	Broken up 10 Jul 1958
Guildford Castle	K378	Henry Robb, at Leith		25 May 1943	13 Nov 1943	11 Mar 1944		to Canada as HMCS Hespeler, 1944; Sold for mercantile service 1946 (later SS Chilcotin)
Hedingham Castle	K491	Henry Robb, at Leith		23 Jul 1943	26 Jan 1944	10 May 1944		to Canada as HMCS Orangeville, 1944; Sold for mercantile service 1947; to Republic of China Navy 1951 as Te An
Knaresborough Castle	K389	Blyth Dry Dock		22 Apr 1943	1 Sep 1943	5 April 1944	1947	Broken up 16 Mar 1956
Launceston Castle	K397	Blyth Dry Dock		27 May 1943	27 Nov 1943	20 June 1944	1947	Broken up 3 Aug 1959
Sandgate Castle	K473	Smiths Dock, at Middlesbrough		23 Jun 1943	28 Dec 1943	18 May 1944	22 Nov 1945	to Canada as HMCS St. Thomas, 1944; sold for mercantile service 1946 (later SS Camosun III)
Tamworth Castle	K393	Smiths Dock, at Middlesbrough		25 Aug 1943	26 Jan 1944	3 Jul 1944	17 Feb 1946	to Canada as HMCS Kincardine; sold for mercantile service 1946
Walmer Castle	K405	Smiths Dock, at Middlesbrough		23 Sep 1943	10 Mar 1944	5 Sep 1944	16 Nov 1945	to Canada as HMCS Leaside; sold for mercantile service 1946 (later SS Coquitlam II)
York Castle		Ferguson Brothers, Port Glasgow		1944	20 Sep 1944			completed Feb 1945 as convoy rescue ship SS Empire Comfort
Hever Castle		Blyth Dry Dock		29 June 1943	24 Feb 1944	15 Aug 1944		to Canada as HMCS Copper Cliff, 1944; Sold for mercantile service 1947, then became Chinese (People's Liberation Army) 1949
Leeds Castle	K384	William Pickersgill & Sons	23 Jan 1943	22 Apr 1943	12 Oct 1943	15 Feb 1944	Nov 1956	broken up 5 Jun 1958
Morpeth Castle	K693	William Pickersgill & Sons	23 Jan 1943	23 Jun 1943	26 Nov 1943	13 Jul 1944	1946	broken up 9 Aug 1960
Nunney Castle	K446	William Pickersgill & Sons	23 Jan 1943	12 Aug 1943	26 Jan 1944	8 Oct 1944		to Canada as HMCS Bowmanville, 1944; Sold for mercantile service 1946, then became Chinese (People's Liberation Army) Kuang Chou 1949
Oxford Castle	K692	Harland and Wolff	23 Jan 1943	21 Jun 1943	11 Dec 1943	10 Mar 1944	1946	broken up 6 Sep 1960
Pevensey Castle	K449	Harland and Wolff	23 Jan 1943	21 Jun 1943	11 Jan 1944	10 Jun 1944	Feb 1946	Became weather ship Weather Monitor in 1959
Rising Castle	K398	Harland and Wolff	23 Jan 1943	21 Jun 1943	8 Feb 1944	26 Jun 1944	14 Mar 1946	to Canada as HMCS Arnprior, 1944; transferred to Uruguay as Montevideo
Scarborough Castle	K536	Fleming & Ferguson	23 Jan 1943	1944	8 Sep 1944	Jan 1945		Completed as convoy rescue ship (Empire Peacemaker)
Sherborne Castle	K453	Harland and Wolff	23 Jan 1943	21 June 1943	24 Feb 1944	14 Jul 1944	8 Mar 1946	to Canada as HMCS Petrolia, 1944; Sold for mercantile service 1946
Tintagel Castle	K399	Ailsa Shipbuilding Company	23 Jan 1943	29 April 1943	13 Dec 1943	7 Apr 1944	Aug 1956	Broken up Jun 1958
Wolvesey Castle	K461	Ailsa Shipbuilding Company	23 Jan 1943	1 Jun 1943	24 Feb 1944	15 Jun 1944	15 Feb 1946	to Canada as HMCS Huntsville, 1944; Sold for mercantile service 1947
Amberley Castle	K386	S P Austin & Son Ltd	2 Feb 1943	31 May 1943	25 Nov 1943	24 Nov 1944	1947	Became the weather ship Weather Adviser in 1960
Berkeley Castle	K387	Barclay Curle	2 Feb 1943	23 Apr 1943	19 Aug 1943	18 Nov 1944	1946	Scrapped 24 February 1956
Carisbrooke Castle	K379	Caledon Shipbuilding & Engineering Company	2 Feb 1943	12 Mar 1943	31 Jul 1943	17 Nov 1943	1947	Scrapped 14 June 1958
Dumbarton Castle	K388	Caledon Shipbuilding & Engineering Company	2 Feb 1943	6 May 1943	28 Sep 1943	25 Feb 1944	1947	Scrapped March 1961
Hurst Castle	K416	Caledon Shipbuilding & Engineering Company	2 Feb 1943	6 August 1943	23 Feb 1944	9 Jun 1944		Sunk by U-482 on 1 Sep 1944
Portchester Castle	K362	Swan Hunter	6 Feb 1943	17 March 1943	21 Jun 1943	8 Nov 1943	1947	Scrapped 14 May 1958
Rushen Castle	K372	Swan Hunter	6 Feb 1943	8 April 1943	16 Jul 1943	24 Feb 1944	1946	Became the weather ship Weather Surveyor in 1960
Shrewsbury Castle	K374	Swan Hunter	6 Feb 1943	5 May 1943	16 Aug 1943	24 Apr 1944		Transferred to Norway on completion and renamed HNoMS Tunsberg Castle; Sunk by mine 12 Dec 1944

Notes: (a) from the previous order placed for a Modified Flower-class corvette named Amaryllis.

Two of those ordered 3 March 1943, three ordered 4 May 1943 and two ordered 10 July 1943 were all cancelled, as were all thirty-six ordered from Canadian shipyards on 15 March 1943.

=== Royal Norwegian Navy ===
- HNoMS Tunsberg Castle – HMS Shrewsbury Castle was loaned to the Royal Norwegian navy on 17 April 1944. On 12 December 1944, she hit a mine and sank.

== Cancelled ==
Fifteen ships ordered for the Royal Navy from UK shipyards as part of the 1943 Programme were all cancelled on 31 October 1943:

- Caldecot Castle – ordered 19 January 1943 from John Brown & Company, Clydebank.
- Dover Castle – ordered 19 January 1943 from A. & J. Inglis, Glasgow.
- Dudley Castle – ordered 19 January 1943 from A. & J. Inglis, Glasgow.
- Bere Castle – ordered 23 January 1943 from John Brown & Company, Clydebank.
- Calshot Castle – ordered 23 January 1943 from John Brown & Company, Clydebank.
- Monmouth Castle (originally to have been Peel Castle) – ordered 23 January 1943 from John Lewis & Sons, Aberdeen.
- Rhuddlan Castle – ordered 23 January 1943 from John Crown & Sons, Sunderland.
- Thornbury Castle – ordered 23 January 1943 from Ferguson Brothers, Port Glasgow.
- Appleby Castle – ordered 3 March 1943 from Austin, at Sunderland.
- Tonbridge Castle – ordered 3 March 1943 from Austin, at Sunderland.
- Norwich Castle – ordered 4 May 1943 from John Brown & Company, Clydebank.
- Oswestry Castle – ordered 4 May 1943 from John Crown & Sons, Sunderland.
- Pendennis Castle – ordered 4 May 1943 from John Crown & Sons, Sunderland.
- Alton Castle – ordered 10 July 1943 from Fleming & Ferguson, Paisley.
- Warkworth Castle – ordered 10 July 1943 from Fleming & Ferguson, Paisley.

The following ships were ordered on 15 March 1943 for the Royal Navy from Canadian shipyards for completion between May 1944 and June 1945, but were all cancelled in December 1943:

- Aydon Castle
- Barnwell Castle
- Beeston Castle
- Bodiam Castle
- Bolton Castle
- Bowes Castle
- Bramber Castle
- Bridgnorth Castle
- Brough Castle
- Canterbury Castle
- Carew Castle
- Chepstow Castle
- Chester Castle
- Christchurch Castle
- Clare Castle
- Clavering Castle
- Clitheroe Castle
- Clun Castle
- Colchester Castle
- Corfe Castle
- Cornet Castle
- Cowes Castle
- Cowling Castle
- Criccieth Castle
- Cromer Castle
- Devizes Castle
- Dhyfe Castle
- Dunster Castle
- Egremont Castle
- Fotheringay Castle
- Helmsley Castle
- Malling Castle
- Malmesbury Castle
- Raby Castle
- Trematon Castle
- Tutbury Castle
- Wigmore Castle

== Castles sunk or destroyed in action ==
- Hurst Castle was sunk by U-482 northwest of Ireland on 1 September 1944.
- HNoMS Tunsberg Castle was sunk by a mine near Båtsfjord, Norway on 12 December 1944.
- Denbigh Castle was hit by a torpedo from U-992 in the Barents Sea on 13 February 1945. She was towed by Bluebell to the Kola Inlet but later capsized.

== U-boats sunk by Castles ==
- U-744 was sunk by Icarus, St. Catharines, Fennel, Chilliwack, Chaudiere, Gatineau and Kenilworth Castle on 6 March 1944
- U-484 was sunk in the north-west of Ireland by Portchester Castle and Helmsdale on 9 September 1944
- U-1200 was sunk south of Ireland by Pevensey Castle, Lancaster Castle, Portchester Castle and Kenilworth Castle on 11 November 1944
- U-387 was sunk in the Barents Sea by Bamborough Castle on 9 December 1944
- U-877 was sunk north-west of the Azores by St. Thomas on 27 December 1944
- U-425 was sunk in the Barents Sea by Lark and Alnwick Castle on 17 February 1945
- U-878 was sunk in the Bay of Biscay by Vanquisher and Tintagel Castle on 10 April 1945

== Film appearance ==
The final third of the film The Cruel Sea is set on the Castle-class corvette Saltash Castle (portrayed by Portchester Castle).

== Post-war conversions ==
Three were converted to passenger/cargo ships for the Union Steamship Company of British Columbia and were known as the White Boats. They were operated from 1946 to 1958 but were heavy on fuel and had limited cargo capacity, for example they could not carry cars in the hold.

- SS Camosun III – ex-HMCS St. Thomas, HMS Sandgate Castle
- SS Chilcotin – ex-HMCS Hespeler, HMS Guildford Castle
- SS Coquitlam II – ex-HMCS Leaside, HMS Walmer Castle
