= HMS Morpeth Castle =

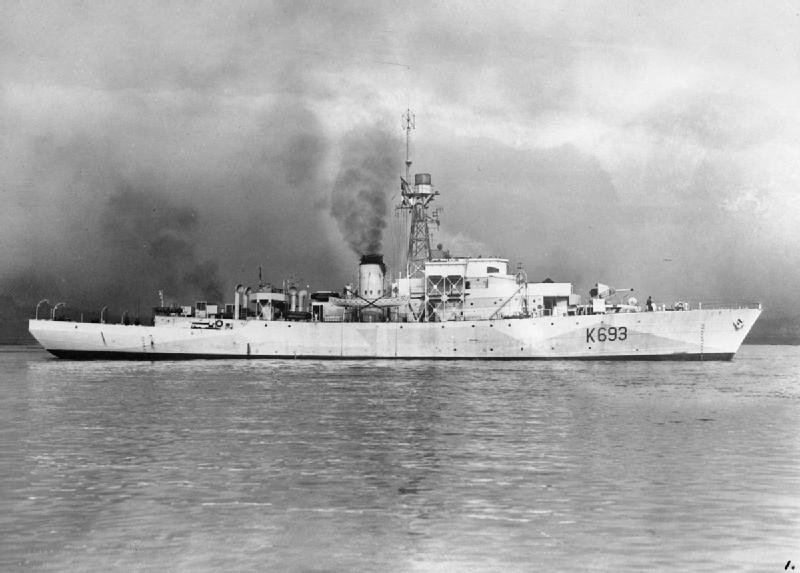
- HMS Morpeth Castle on 17 July 1944.

History

United Kingdom
- Name: Morpeth Castle
- Namesake: Morpeth Castle
- Ordered: 23 January 1943
- Builder: William Pickersgill & Sons Ltd., Sunderland
- Laid down: 23 June 1943
- Launched: 26 November 1943
- Commissioned: 13 July 1944
- Identification: Pennant number: K693
- Fate: Scrapped, August 1960

General characteristics
- Class & type: Castle-class corvette
- Displacement: 1,010 long tons (1,030 t) (standard); 1,510 long tons (1,530 t) (deep load)
- Length: 252 ft (76.8 m)
- Beam: 33 ft (10.1 m)
- Draught: 14 ft (4.3 m)
- Installed power: 2 Admiralty 3-drum boilers; 2,880 ihp (2,150 kW)
- Propulsion: 2 shafts, 2 geared steam turbines
- Speed: 16.5 knots (30.6 km/h; 19.0 mph)
- Range: 6,500 nmi (12,000 km; 7,500 mi) at 15 knots (28 km/h; 17 mph)
- Complement: 99
- Sensors & processing systems: Type 145 and Type 147 ASDIC; Type 277 search radar; HF/DF radio direction finder
- Armament: 1 × single 4 in (102 mm) gun; 2 × twin, 2 × single 20 mm (0.8 in) AA guns; 1 × 3-barrel Squid anti-submarine mortar; 15 × depth charges, 1 rack and 2 throwers

HMS Morpeth Castle (K693) was one of 44 Castle-class corvette built for the Royal Navy during the Second World War. She was named after Morpeth Castle in Morpeth. Completed in 1943, she was used as a convoy escort during the war and was scrapped in August 1960.

== Design and description ==
The Castle-class corvette was a stretched version of the preceding Flower class, enlarged to improve seakeeping and to accommodate modern weapons. The ships displaced 1,010 long tons (1,030 t) at standard load and 1,510 long tons (1,530 t) at deep load. They had an overall length of 252 feet (76.8 m), a beam of 36 feet 9 inches (11.2 m) and a deep draught of 14 feet (4.3 m). They were powered by a pair of triple-expansion steam engines, each driving one propeller shaft using steam provided by two Admiralty three-drum boilers. The engines developed a total of 2,880 indicated horsepower (2,150 kW) and gave a maximum speed of 16.5 knots (30.6 km/h; 19.0 mph). The Castles carried enough fuel oil to give them a range of 6,500 nautical miles (12,000 km; 7,500 mi) at 15 knots (28 km/h; 17 mph). The ships' complement was 99 officers and ratings.

The Castle-class ships were equipped with a single QF 4-inch (102 mm) Mk XVI gun forward, but their primary weapon was their single three-barrel Squid anti-submarine mortar. This was backed up by one depth charge rail and two throwers for 15 depth charges. The ships were fitted with two twin and a pair of single mounts for 20-millimetre (0.8 in) Oerlikon light AA guns. Provision was made for a further four single mounts if needed. They were equipped with Type 145Q and Type 147B ASDIC sets to detect submarines by reflections from sound waves beamed into the water. A Type 277 search radar and a HF/DF radio direction finder rounded out the Castles' sensor suite.

== Construction and career ==
Morpeth Castle was laid down by William Pickersgill & Sons at their shipyard at Sunderland, on 23 June 1943 and launched on 26 November 1943. She was completed in July 1944 and served as a convoy escort. She was decommissioned and scrapped on 9 August 1960, at Llanelly.
