= HMS Sherborne Castle =

Royal Navy ship

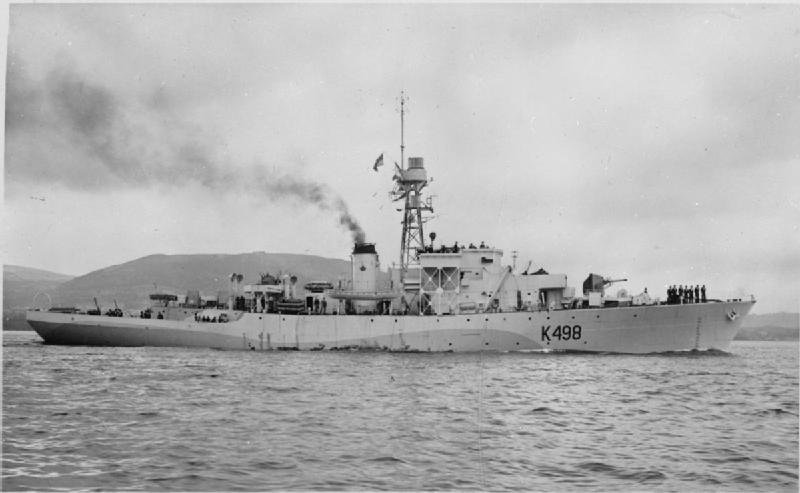
- HMCS Petrolia underway

History

United Kingdom
- Name: Sherborne Castle
- Namesake: Sherborne Castle
- Builder: Harland & Wolff, Belfast
- Laid down: 21 June 1943
- Launched: 24 February 1944
- Identification: Pennant number: K453
- Fate: Transferred to the Royal Canadian Navy

Canada
- Name: Petrolia
- Namesake: Petrolia, Ontario
- Acquired: 1943
- Commissioned: 29 June 1944
- Decommissioned: 8 March 1946
- Identification: Pennant number: K498
- Honours and awards: Atlantic 1944–45
- Fate: Sold for mercantile service 8 March 1946
- Name: Maid of Athens (1946); Bharat Laxmi (1947–65)
- Fate: Broken up at Bombay, 1965

General characteristics (as built)
- Type: Castle-class corvette
- Displacement: 1,060 long tons (1,077 t)
- Length: 252 ft (77 m)
- Beam: 36 ft 8 in (11.18 m)
- Draught: 13 ft 6 in (4.11 m)
- Installed power: 2 × water-tube boilers; 2,750 ihp (2,050 kW)
- Propulsion: 1 × 4-cylinder triple-expansion steam engine; Single screw
- Speed: 16.5 knots (30.6 km/h; 19.0 mph)
- Range: 6,200 nmi (11,500 km) at 15 kn (28 km/h; 17 mph)
- Complement: 120
- Sensors & processing systems: Type 272 radar; Type 145 sonar; Type 147B sonar
- Armament: 1 × QF 4-inch Mk XIX gun; 1 × Squid anti-submarine mortar; 1 × Depth charge rail, 15 depth charges; 4–10 × 20 mm anti-aircraft cannon

HMS Sherborne Castle was a Castle-class corvette constructed for the Royal Navy during the Second World War. Before completion, the ship was transferred to the Royal Canadian Navy and renamed HMCS Petrolia. During the war Petrolia saw service as a convoy escort. Following the war, the corvette was sold for mercantile use and renamed Maid of Athens in 1946 and in 1947, renamed Bharat Laxmi. The ship remained in service until 1965 when Bharat Laxmi was sold for breaking up.

== Design and description ==
The Castle class were an improved corvette design over their predecessor Flower class. The Flower class was not considered acceptable for mid-Atlantic sailing and was only used on Atlantic convoy duty out of need. Though the Admiralty would have preferred Loch-class frigates, the inability of many small shipyards to construct the larger ships required them to come up with a smaller vessel. The increased length of the Castle class over their predecessors and their improved hull form gave the Castles better speed and performance on patrol in the North Atlantic and an acceptable replacement for the Flowers. This, coupled with improved anti-submarine armament in the form of the Squid mortar led to a much more capable anti-submarine warfare (ASW) vessel. However, the design did have criticisms, mainly in the way it handled at low speeds and that the class's maximum speed was already slower than the speeds of the new U-boats they would be facing.

A Castle-class corvette was 252 feet (77 m) long with a beam of 36 feet 8 inches (11.18 m) and a draught of 13 feet 6 inches (4.11 m) at deep load. (Note: Brown states the beam at 36.5 feet (11.1 m) and the draught at 13.5 feet (4.1 m)) The ships displaced 1,060 long tons (1,080 t) standard and 1,580 long tons (1,610 t) deep load. (Note: Chesneau states the displacement at deep load as 1,590–1,630 long tons (1,620–1,660 t)) The ships had a complement of 120. (Note: Brown states the complement as 99 and Johnston states the complement of Canadian ships at 112 (7 officers and 105 ratings).)

The ships were powered by two Admiralty three-drum boilers which created 2,750 indicated horsepower (2,050 kW). This powered one vertical triple expansion engine that drove one shaft, giving the ships a maximum speed of 16.5 knots (30.6 km/h; 19.0 mph). The ships carried 480 tons of oil giving them a range of 6,200 nautical miles (11,500 km; 7,100 mi) at 15 knots (28 km/h; 17 mph).

The corvettes were armed with one QF 4-inch Mk XIX gun mounted forward. (Note: Mk XIX = Mark 19. Britain used Roman numerals to denote Marks (models) of ordnance until after World War II. This was the nineteenth model of British QF 4-inch gun) Anti-air armament varied from 4 to 10 Oerlikon 20 mm cannons. For ASW purposes, the ships were equipped with one three-barreled Squid anti-submarine mortar with 81 projectiles. The ships also had two depth charge throwers and one depth charge rail on the stern that came with 15 depth charges.

The ships were equipped with Type 145 and Type 147B ASDIC. The Type 147B was tied to the Squid anti-submarine mortar and would automatically set the depth on the fuses of the projectiles until the moment of firing. A single Squid-launched attack had a success rate of 25%. The class was also provided with HF/DF and Type 277 radar.

== Construction and career ==
Sherborne Castle, named after the castle in Dorset, was laid down on 21 June 1943 by Harland & Wolff at Belfast. At some point in 1943, the ship was transferred to the Royal Canadian Navy was launched on 24 February 1944. The corvette, now renamed Petrolia for the town in southern Ontario, was commissioned on 29 June 1944 with the pennant number K499.

Following commissioning, Petrolia was sent to Tobermory for workups before being assigned to the Mid-Ocean Escort Force as a member of the convoy escort group C-3 in July 1944. AS member of the group, the corvette remained a convoy escort for the rest of the war, returning to Canada in June 1945. In August 1945, the ship underwent a refit at Charlottetown, Prince Edward Island before being placed in reserve at Halifax, Nova Scotia in October.

Petrolia was sold for mercantile use on 8 March 1946 to Castle Sg Co SA and renamed Maid of Athens with a Panamanian registry. The ship was converted to a cargo ship with a gross register tonnage of 1,541 tons. In 1947, the ship's registry was transferred to Bombay, India and the vessel was sold to Bharat Line Ltd. and renamed Bharat Laxmi. (Note: Sometimes spelled Bharatlaxmi) Bharat Laxmi remained in service until May 1965, when the ship was broken up at Bombay.
