= HMS Pembroke Castle =

British WWII Castle-class corvette

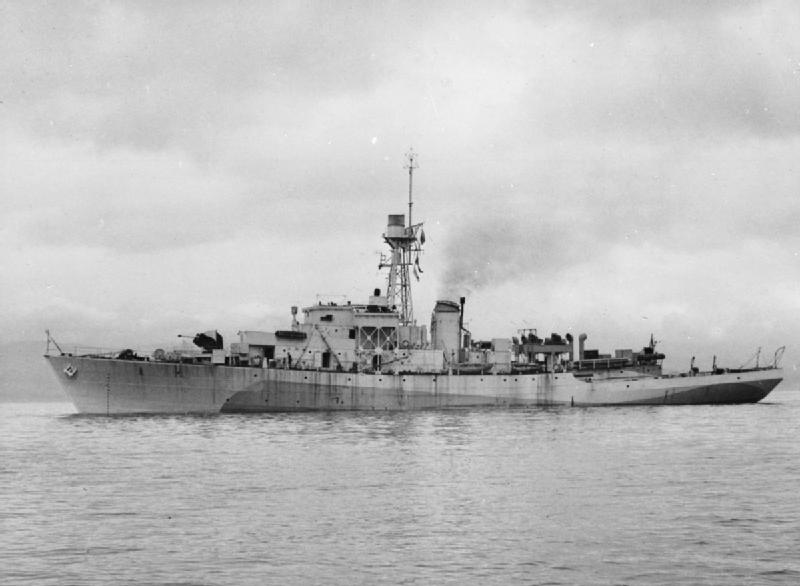
- HMCS Tillsonburg underway

History

United Kingdom
- Name: Pembroke Castle
- Namesake: Pembroke Castle
- Builder: Ferguson Brothers Ltd., Port Glasgow
- Laid down: 3 June 1943
- Launched: 12 February 1944
- Identification: Pennant number: K450
- Fate: Transferred to the Royal Canadian Navy

Canada
- Name: Tillsonburg
- Namesake: Tillsonburg, Ontario
- Acquired: 1943
- Commissioned: 29 June 1944
- Decommissioned: 8 March 1946
- Identification: Pennant number: K496
- Honours and awards: Atlantic 1944–45
- Fate: Sold for mercantile service 5 September 1946

Republic of China
- Name: Ta Ching (1946); Chiu Chin (秋瑾, 1947–50)
- Owner: China Merchants Steam Navigation Company
- In service: 1946
- Out of service: June 1, 1950
- Fate: Taken over by Nationalist Chinese government 1 June 1950

Republic of China
- Name: Kao An (高安, 1950-1955); Shuai Zhen(率真, 1955-1963)
- Owner: Republic of China Navy
- Acquired: June 1, 1950
- Decommissioned: 1963
- Fate: Discarded 1963

General characteristics (as built)
- Type: Castle-class corvette
- Displacement: 1,060 long tons (1,077 t)
- Length: 252 ft (77 m)
- Beam: 36 ft 8 in (11.18 m)
- Draught: 13 ft 6 in (4.11 m)
- Installed power: 2 × water-tube boilers; 2,750 ihp (2,050 kW)
- Propulsion: 1 × 4-cylinder triple-expansion steam engine; Single screw
- Speed: 16.5 knots (30.6 km/h; 19.0 mph)
- Range: 6,200 nmi (11,500 km) at 15 kn (28 km/h; 17 mph)
- Complement: 120
- Sensors & processing systems: Type 272 radar; Type 145 sonar; Type 147B sonar
- Armament: 1 × QF 4-inch Mk XIX gun; 1 × Squid anti-submarine mortar; 1 × Depth charge rail, 15 depth charges; 4–10 × 20 mm anti-aircraft cannon

HMS Pembroke Castle was a Castle-class corvette built for the British Royal Navy during the Second World War. Before completion, the ship was transferred to the Royal Canadian Navy and renamed HMCS Tillsonburg. Tillsonburg saw service as a convoy escort during the Second World War in the Battle of the Atlantic. Following the war, the corvette was converted for merchant use and sold to Chinese interests. The ship was renamed Ta Ting in 1946, Chiu Chin in 1947 before being taken over the Nationalist Chinese government in 1951, rearmed and renamed Kao An. The ship remained in service with the Republic of China Navy until being discarded in 1963.

== Design and description ==
The Castle class were an improved corvette design over their predecessor Flower class. The Flower class was not considered acceptable for mid-Atlantic sailing and was only used on Atlantic convoy duty out of need. Though the Admiralty would have preferred Loch-class frigates, the inability of many small shipyards to construct the larger ships required them to come up with a smaller vessel. The increased length of the Castle class over their predecessors and their improved hull form gave the Castles better speed and performance on patrol in the North Atlantic and an acceptable replacement for the Flowers. This, coupled with improved anti-submarine armament in the form of the Squid mortar led to a much more capable anti-submarine warfare (ASW) vessel. However, the design did have criticisms, mainly in the way it handled at low speeds and that the class's maximum speed was already slower than the speeds of the new U-boats they would be facing.

A Castle-class corvette was 252 feet (77 m) long with a beam of 36 feet 8 inches (11.18 m) and a draught of 13 feet 6 inches (4.11 m) at deep load. (Note: Brown states the beam at 36.5 feet (11.1 m) and the draught at 13.5 feet (4.1 m)) The ships displaced 1,060 long tons (1,080 t) standard and 1,580 long tons (1,610 t) deep load. (Note: Chesneau states the displacement at deep load as 1,590–1,630 long tons (1,620–1,660 t)) The ships had a complement of 120. (Note: Brown states the complement as 99 and Johnston states the complement of Canadian ships at 112 (7 officers and 105 ratings).)

The ships were powered by two Admiralty three-drum boilers which created 2,750 indicated horsepower (2,050 kW). This powered one vertical triple expansion engine that drove one shaft, giving the ships a maximum speed of 16.5 knots (30.6 km/h; 19.0 mph). The ships carried 480 tons of oil giving them a range of 6,200 nautical miles (11,500 km; 7,100 mi) at 15 knots (28 km/h; 17 mph).

The corvettes were armed with one QF 4-inch Mk XIX gun mounted forward. (Note: Mk XIX = Mark 19. Britain used Roman numerals to denote Marks (models) of ordnance until after World War II. This was the nineteenth model of British QF 4-inch gun) Anti-air armament varied from 4 to 10 Oerlikon 20 mm cannons. For ASW purposes, the ships were equipped with one three-barreled Squid anti-submarine mortar with 81 projectiles. The ships also had two depth charge throwers and one depth charge rail on the stern that came with 15 depth charges.

The ships were equipped with Type 145 and Type 147B ASDIC. The Type 147B was tied to the Squid anti-submarine mortar and would automatically set the depth on the fuses of the projectiles until the moment of firing. A single Squid-launched attack had a success rate of 25%. The class was also provided with HF/DF and Type 277 radar.

== Service history ==
Pembroke Castle, named after the castle in Wales, was laid down on 3 June 1943 by Ferguson Brothers Ltd., at Port Glasgow. At some point in 1943, the ship was transferred to the Royal Canadian Navy was launched on 12 February 1944. The corvette, now renamed Tillsonburg for the town in southern Ontario, was commissioned on 29 June 1944 with the pennant number K496.

Following workups at Stornoway, Tillsonburg joined the Mid-Ocean Escort Force as a convoy escort assigned to group C-3. The corvette remained in this role for the remainder of the war, making her final crossing of the war in mid-June 1945. Upon her return to Canada, Tillsonburg was based at St. John's, Sydney and Halifax, Nova Scotia for brief periods before being paid off at Halifax on 15 February 1946.

On 5 September 1946, the ship was sold to Chinese interests and renamed Ta Ching. The ship was converted to a merchant vessel with a gross register tonnage of 1,387 tons. In 1947, the ship was renamed Chiu Chin before being taken over the Nationalist Chinese government on 1 June 1951 and renamed Kao An. (Note: The sources disagree as to which party in the Chinese Civil War assumed control of the ship. Macpherson and Barrie, Chesneau and Jane's Fighting Ships claim it was Nationalist China, while Colledge claims it was Communist China.) The ship was rearmed with one 120 mm (5 in) gun, one 76 mm (3 in) gun and two twin mounted 40 mm cannons. Kao An was discarded in 1963.
