= HMS Norham Castle =

1944 Castle-class corvette

History

United Kingdom
- Name: Totnes Castle; Norham Castle
- Namesake: Norham Castle
- Ordered: 19 December 1942
- Builder: A. & J. Inglis Ltd, Glasgow
- Laid down: 30 August 1943
- Launched: 12 April 1944
- Identification: Pennant number: K447
- Fate: Transferred to the Royal Canadian Navy

Canada
- Name: Humberstone
- Namesake: Humberstone, Ontario
- Acquired: 1943
- Commissioned: 6 September 1944
- Decommissioned: 17 November 1945
- Identification: Pennant number: K497
- Honours and awards: Atlantic 1944–45
- Fate: Sold for mercantile service 1946

History
- Name: Taiwei (1946); South Ocean (1954)
- Port of registry: Republic of China (1946); South Korea (1954)
- In service: 1946
- Out of service: 1959
- Fate: Scrapped, 1959

General characteristics (as built)
- Type: Castle-class corvette
- Displacement: 1,060 long tons (1,077 t)
- Length: 252 ft (77 m)
- Beam: 36 ft 8 in (11.18 m)
- Draught: 13 ft 6 in (4.11 m)
- Installed power: 2 × water-tube boilers; 2,750 ihp (2,050 kW)
- Propulsion: 1 × 4-cylinder triple-expansion steam engine; Single screw
- Speed: 16.5 knots (30.6 km/h; 19.0 mph)
- Range: 6,200 nmi (11,500 km) at 15 kn (28 km/h; 17 mph)
- Complement: 120
- Sensors & processing systems: Type 272 radar; Type 145 sonar; Type 147B sonar
- Armament: 1 × QF 4-inch Mk XIX gun; 1 × Squid anti-submarine mortar; 1 × Depth charge rail, 15 depth charges; 4–10 × 20 mm anti-aircraft cannon

HMS Norham Castle, initially named Totnes Castle, was a Castle-class corvette constructed for the British Royal Navy during the Second World War. Before completion, the ship was transferred to the Royal Canadian Navy, renamed HMCS Humberstone, and served the rest of the war as a convoy escort. Following the war, the corvette was sold for mercantile service, beginning as Taiwei in 1946 and ending as South Ocean in 1954. The ship was broken up in 1959.

== Design and description ==
The Castle class were an improved corvette design over their predecessor Flower class. The Flower class was not considered acceptable for mid-Atlantic sailing and was only used on Atlantic convoy duty out of need. Though the Admiralty would have preferred Loch-class frigates, the inability of many small shipyards to construct the larger ships required them to come up with a smaller vessel. The increased length of the Castle class over their predecessors and their improved hull form gave the Castles better speed and performance on patrol in the North Atlantic and an acceptable replacement for the Flowers. This, coupled with improved anti-submarine armament in the form of the Squid mortar led to a much more capable anti-submarine warfare (ASW) vessel. However, the design did have criticisms, mainly in the way it handled at low speeds and that the class's maximum speed was already slower than the speeds of the new U-boats they would be facing.

A Castle-class corvette was 252 feet (77 m) long with a beam of 36 feet 8 inches (11.18 m) and a draught of 13 feet 6 inches (4.11 m) at deep load. (Note: Brown states the beam at 36.5 feet (11.1 m) and the draught at 13.5 feet (4.1 m)) The ships displaced 1,060 long tons (1,077 t) standard and 1,580 long tons (1,605 t) deep load. (Note: Chesneau states the displacement at deep load as 1,590–1,630 long tons (1,616–1,656 t)) The ships had a complement of 120. (Note: Brown states the complement as 99 and Johnston states the complement of Canadian ships at 112 (7 officers and 105 ratings).)

The ships were powered by two Admiralty three-drum boilers which created 2,750 indicated horsepower (2,050 kW). This powered one vertical triple expansion engine that drove one shaft, giving the ships a maximum speed of 16.5 knots (30.6 km/h; 19.0 mph). The ships carried 480 tons of oil giving them a range of 6,200 nautical miles (11,500 km; 7,100 mi) at 15 knots (28 km/h; 17 mph).

The corvettes were armed with one QF 4-inch Mk XIX gun mounted forward. (Note: Mk XIX = Mark 19. Britain used Roman numerals to denote Marks (models) of ordnance until after World War II. This was the nineteenth model of British QF 4-inch gun) Anti-air armament varied from 4 to 10 Oerlikon 20 mm cannons. For ASW purposes, the ships were equipped with one three-barreled Squid anti-submarine mortar with 81 projectiles. The ships also had two depth charge throwers and one depth charge rail on the stern that came with 15 depth charges.

The ships were equipped with Type 145 and Type 147B ASDIC. The Type 147B was tied to the Squid anti-submarine mortar and would automatically set the depth on the fuses of the projectiles until the moment of firing. A single Squid-launched attack had a success rate of 25%. The class was also provided with HF/DF and Type 277 radar.

== Construction and career ==
Norham Castle, named after the castle in Northumberland, was ordered on 19 December 1942. The ship was laid down on 30 August 1943 by A. & J. Inglish Ltd. at Glasgow and launched on 12 April 1944. At some point in 1943, the vessel was transferred to the Royal Canadian Navy. Renamed Humberstone after a community in southern Ontario, the corvette was commissioned on 6 September 1944 with the pennant number K497.

After commissioning Humberstone was sent to Tobermory to work up. Following that, the ship joined the Mid-Ocean Escort Force as a member of the escort group C-8 for convoy escort duty in the Atlantic Ocean. Humberstone remained as a convoy escort for the remainder of the war. In May 1945, the ship returned to Canada, travelling to Esquimalt, British Columbia in June. The ship was paid off on 17 November 1945.

In 1946, the ship was sold for mercantile service and was converted to a cargo ship with a gross register tonnage of 1,304 tons. Renamed Taiwei and operating under Chinese ownership while registered at Shanghai in 1946, the ship was sold in 1947 to Foo Ming SS Co Ltd and renamed Chang Chen. In 1949, the cargo ship was renamed twice, first Tai Shan, then King Kang. In 1950 King Kang was sold to Wallem & Co Ltd and registered in Panama. The ship was renamed Flying Dragon in 1950 and San Blas in 1951. She became South Ocean in 1954, owned by Korea Deep Sea Fishery Co Ltd and operating under a Korean flag. The ship was broken up at Hong Kong in September 1959 by Hong Kong Chiap Hua Manufactory Co Ltd.
