= HMS Nunney Castle =

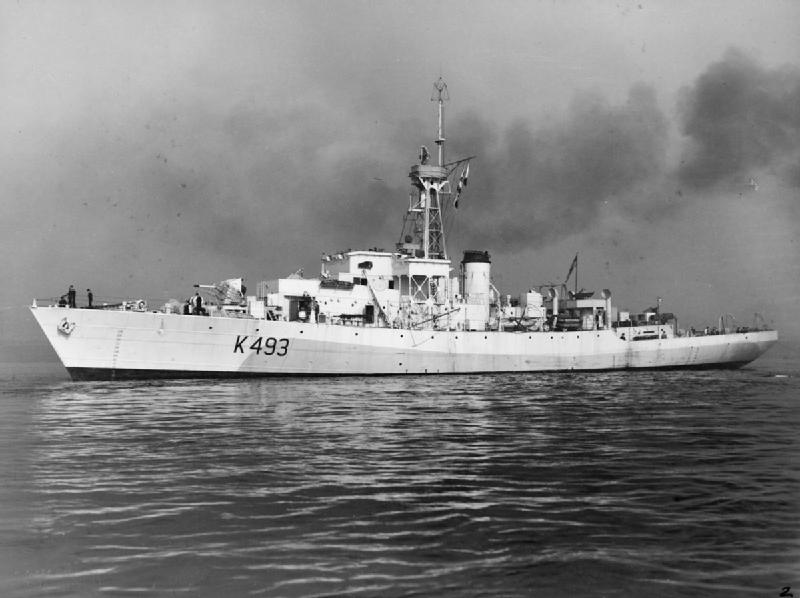
- As HMCS Bowmanville during the Second World War

History

United Kingdom
- Name: Nunney Castle
- Namesake: Nunney Castle
- Ordered: 23 January 1943
- Builder: William Pickersgill & Sons Ltd, Sunderland
- Laid down: 12 August 1943
- Launched: 26 January 1944
- Identification: Pennant number: K446
- Fate: Transferred to the Royal Canadian Navy

Canada
- Name: Bowmanville
- Namesake: Bowmanville, Ontario
- Acquired: 1943
- Commissioned: 28 September 1944
- Decommissioned: 15 February 1946
- Identification: Pennant number: K493
- Honours and awards: Atlantic 1944–45
- Fate: Sold for mercantile service 5 September 1946

China
- Name: Ta Shun(Chinese: 大純)
- Acquired: 1947
- Commissioned: 1949
- Decommissioned: 1976
- Renamed: Yuan Pei(Chinese: 元培); Kuang Chou (Chinese: 廣州, 1949)
- Stricken: 1986
- Identification: 602

General characteristics
- Type: Castle-class corvette
- Displacement: 1,060 long tons (1,077 t)
- Length: 252 ft (77 m)
- Beam: 36 ft 8 in (11.18 m)
- Draught: 13 ft 6 in (4.11 m)
- Installed power: 2 × water-tube boilers; 2,750 ihp (2,050 kW)
- Propulsion: 1 × 4-cylinder triple-expansion steam engine; Single screw
- Speed: 16.5 knots (30.6 km/h; 19.0 mph)
- Range: 6,200 nmi (11,500 km) at 15 kn (28 km/h; 17 mph)
- Complement: 120
- Sensors & processing systems: Type 272 radar; Type 145 sonar; Type 147B sonar
- Armament: 1 × QF 4-inch Mk XIX gun; 1 × Squid anti-submarine mortar; 1 × Depth charge rail, 15 depth charges; 4–10 × 20 mm anti-aircraft cannon

HMS Nunney Castle was a Castle-class corvette ordered by the British Royal Navy during the Second World War. The ship was transferred to the Royal Canadian Navy before completion and renamed HMCS Bowmanville. Bowmanville served with the Royal Canadian Navy in the final years of the war and was sold for mercantile use in 1946. Renamed Ta Shun, the ship sailed under a Chinese flag, later being renamed Yuan Pei. In 1949, the former corvette was taken over by the Communist-controlled government of China and rearmed and renamed Kuang Chou. Kuang Chou was listed until 1976 and was stricken in 1986.

== Design and description ==
The Castle class were an improved corvette design over their predecessor Flower class. The Flower class was not considered acceptable for mid-Atlantic sailing and was only used on Atlantic convoy duty out of need. Though the Admiralty would have preferred Loch-class frigates, the inability of many small shipyards to construct the larger ships required them to come up with a smaller vessel. The increased length of the Castle class over their predecessors and their improved hull form gave the Castles better speed and performance on patrol in the North Atlantic and an acceptable replacement for the Flowers. This, coupled with improved anti-submarine armament in the form of the Squid mortar led to a much more capable anti-submarine warfare (ASW) vessel. However, the design did have criticisms, mainly in the way it handled at low speeds and that the class's maximum speed was already slower than the speeds of the new U-boats they would be facing.

A Castle-class corvette was 252 feet (77 m) long with a beam of 36 feet 8 inches (11.18 m) and a draught of 13 feet 6 inches (4.11 m) at deep load. (Note: Brown states the beam at 36.5 feet (11.1 m) and the draught at 13.5 feet (4.1 m)) The ships displaced 1,060 long tons (1,077 t) standard and 1,580 long tons (1,605 t) deep load. (Note: Chesneau states the displacement at deep load as 1,590–1,630 long tons (1,616–1,656 t)) The ships had a complement of 120. (Note: Brown states the complement as 99 and Johnston states the complement of Canadian ships at 112 (7 officers and 105 ratings).)

The ships were powered by two Admiralty three-drum boilers which created 2,750 indicated horsepower (2,050 kW). This powered one vertical triple expansion engine that drove one shaft, giving the ships a maximum speed of 16.5 knots (30.6 km/h; 19.0 mph). The ships carried 480 tons of oil giving them a range of 6,200 nautical miles (11,500 km; 7,100 mi) at 15 knots (28 km/h; 17 mph).

The corvettes were armed with one QF 4-inch Mk XIX gun mounted forward. (Note: Mk XIX = Mark 19. Britain used Roman numerals to denote Marks (models) of ordnance until after World War II. This was the nineteenth model of British QF 4-inch gun) Anti-air armament varied from 4 to 10 Oerlikon 20 mm cannons. For ASW purposes, the ships were equipped with one three-barreled Squid anti-submarine mortar with 81 projectiles. The ships also had two depth charge throwers and one depth charge rail on the stern that came with 15 depth charges.

The ships were equipped with Type 145 and Type 147B ASDIC. The Type 147B was tied to the Squid anti-submarine mortar and would automatically set the depth on the fuses of the projectiles until the moment of firing. A single Squid-launched attack had a success rate of 25%. The class was also provided with HF/DF and Type 277 radar.

== Construction and career ==
Nunney Castle was ordered on 23 January 1943 from William Pickersgill & Sons Ltd of Sunderland. Like all ships of the class, the vessel was named after a castle in the United Kingdom, Nunney Castle in Somerset and awarded the pennant number K446. The ship was laid down on 12 August 1943 and launched on 26 January 1944. At some point in 1943, the ship was formally transferred to the Royal Canadian Navy. The corvette was commissioned into the Royal Canadian Navy on 28 September 1944 with the pennant number K493. The ship was named after Bowmanville, a town in southern Ontario.

After commissioning, Bowmanville worked up at Tobermory before joining the Mid-Ocean Escort Force escort group C-4 for convoy escort duty. The corvette served as convoy escort for the rest of the war. In June 1945, Bowmanville returned to Canada and was based out of Halifax until being paid off on 15 January 1946.

Bowmanville was sold for mercantile use on 5 September 1946 and served under a Nationalist Chinese flag initially as Ta Shun, then later as Yuan Pei. In 1949, Yuan Pei was taken over by the Communist Chinese government after the Nationalists abandoned mainland China. The vessel was rearmed with two single 130 mm (5 in) guns, one 45 mm (1.8 in) gun and five single 37 mm (1.5 in) guns. The ship was renamed Kuang Chou and was listed as being in service until 1976, and stricken in 1986.

== Notes ==
=== References ===
- Brown, David K. (2007). Atlantic Escorts Ships: Ships, Weapons & Tactics in World War II. Barnsley, UK: Seaforth Publishing. ISBN 978-1-84415-702-0.
- Brown, David K. (2012). Nelson to Vanguard: Warship Design and Development 1923–1945. Barnsley, UK: Seaforth Publishing. ISBN 978-1-84832-149-6.
- Chesneau, Roger, ed. (1980). Conway's All the World's Fighting Ships 1922–1946. Greenwich, UK: Conway Maritime Press. ISBN 0-85177-146-7.
- Colledge, J. J.; Warlow, Ben (2006) [1969]. Ships of the Royal Navy: The Complete Record of All Fighting Ships of the Royal Navy from the 15th Century to the Present (3rd Rev ed.). London: Chatham Publishing. ISBN 978-1-86176-281-8. OCLC 67375475.
- Gardiner, Robert; Chumbley, Stephen; Budzbon, Przemysław, eds. (1995). Conway's All the World's Fighting Ships 1947–1995. Annapolis, Maryland: Naval Institute Press. ISBN 1-55750-132-7.
- Macpherson, Ken; Barrie, Ron (2002). The Ships of Canada's Naval Forces 1910–2002 (Third ed.). St. Catharines, Ontario: Vanwell Publishing. ISBN 1-55125-072-1.
