= HMS Berkeley Castle (K387) =

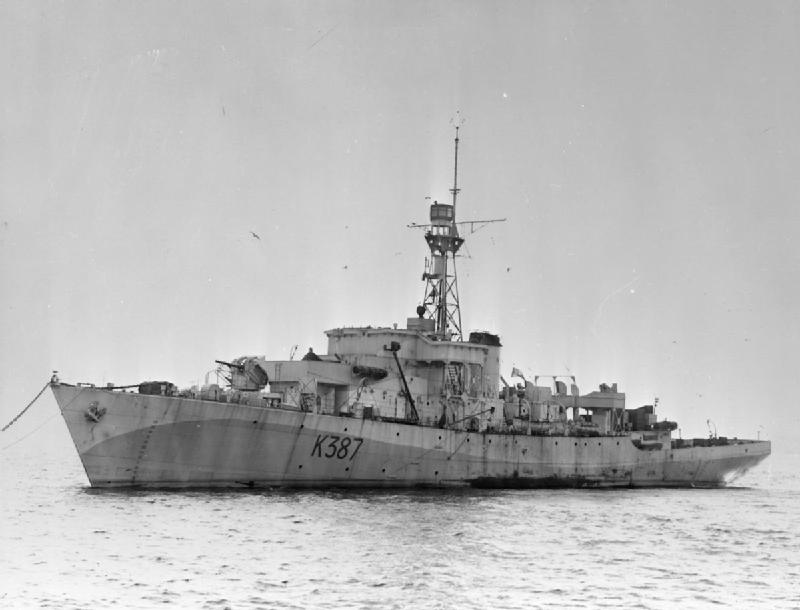
- Berkeley Castle on the River Clyde, December 1943

History

United Kingdom
- Name: HMS Berkeley Castle
- Namesake: Berkeley Castle
- Builder: Barclay, Curle & Co. Ltd
- Laid down: 23 March 1943
- Launched: 19 August 1943
- Commissioned: 18 November 1943
- Identification: Pennant number: K387
- Fate: Scrapped 29 February 1956

General characteristics
- Class & type: Castle-class corvette

HMS Berkeley Castle was a Castle-class corvette of the United Kingdom's Royal Navy. Built and commissioned in 1943, she escorted convoys from 1944 to 1945. She later served as an air-sea rescue ship until being placed in reserve. Damaged beyond repair in the North Sea flood of 1953 while at a dry dock in Sheerness, she was scrapped a few years later. She was named after Berkeley Castle in Gloucestershire.

== Design ==
The Castle-class corvettes were an improved and enlarged derivative of the earlier Flower-class corvettes, which was intended to be built by shipyards that could not build the larger and more capable frigates. The greater length of the Castles gave made them better seaboats than the Flowers, which were not originally designed for ocean escort work. Large numbers (96 in total) were ordered in late 1942 and early 1943 from shipyards in the United Kingdom and Canada, but Allied successes in the Battle of the Atlantic meant that the requirement for escorts was reduced, and many ships (including all the Canadian ones) were cancelled.

The Castles were 252 feet 0 inches (76.81 m) long overall, 234 feet 0 inches (71.32 m) at the waterline and 225 feet 0 inches (68.58 m) between perpendiculars. Beam was 36 feet 6 inches (11.13 m) and draught was 13 feet 5 inches (4.09 m) aft at full load. Displacement was about 1,060 long tons (1,080 t) standard and 1,590–1,630 long tons (1,620–1,660 t) full load. Two Admiralty Three-drum water tube boilers fed steam to a vertical triple expansion engine rated at 2,750 indicated horsepower (2,050 kW) which drove a single propeller shaft. This gave a speed of 16.5 knots (30.6 km/h; 19.0 mph). 480 tons of oil were carried, giving a range of 6,200 nautical miles (11,500 km; 7,100 mi) at 15 knots (28 km/h; 17 mph).

The ships had a main gun armament of a single QF 4-inch Mk XIX dual-purpose gun, backed up by two twin and two single Oerlikon 20 mm cannon. Anti-submarine armament consisted of a single triple-barrelled Squid anti-submarine mortar with 81 depth charges backed up by two depth charge throwers and a single depth charge rail, with 15 depth charges carried. Type 272 or Type 277 surface search radar was fitted, as was high-frequency direction finding (HF/DF) gear. The ships' sonar outfit was Type 145 and Type 147B.

== Service ==
Berkeley Castle was one of five Castle-class corvettes ordered on 2 February 1943. She was laid down at the Barclay Curle shipyard in Glasgow on 23 April 1943, launched on 19 August and commissioned on 18 November 1943. Berkeley Castle was the second ship of that name to serve with the Royal Navy.

After working up, Berkeley Castle joined the 15th Escort Group, escorting her first convoy in late January 1944. On 1 March 1944, she joined the 40th Escort Group, operating on the Gibraltar convoy route, and on 23 May transferred to the B5 Escort Group, with the same duties. On 10 September 1944, the B5 Escort Group was renamed the 31st Escort Group, with Berkeley Castle as Senior Officer's ship, and returned to UK coastal waters, continuing to the end of the war in Europe.

Berkeley Castle was then employed as an air-sea rescue ship until mid 1946, when she was placed in reserve at Harwich. She was refitted at London in 1949, before returning to reserve. On the night of 31 January/1 February 1953, Berkeley Castle was in dry dock at the naval dockyard at Sheerness, Kent when Sheerness was struck by the North Sea flood of 1953. The tidal surge overtopped the dock gates, flooding the dry dock and causing Berkeley Castle to float off her blocks and capsize. She was refloated, but damage was such that she was beyond economic repair and was not repaired. (Note: The submarine Sirdar, in the adjacent dry dock to Berkeley Castle, also sank when her dock flooded during the night, but unlike the corvette, was repaired and returned to service.) She was placed on the disposal list in 1955. She arrived at Thos. W. Ward's breaking yard in Grays, Essex, on 29 February 1956 for scrapping. Prior to demolition she was used for filming the comedy Up The Creek as the fictitious HMS Berkeley.

== Bibliography ==
- Brown, David K. (2007). Atlantic Escorts: Ships, Weapons & Tactics in World War II. Barnsley, UK: Seaforth Publishing. ISBN 978-1-84415-702-0.
- Brown, David K. (2012). Nelson to Vanguard: Warship Design and Development 1923–1945. Barnsley, UK: Seaforth Publishing. ISBN 978-1-84832-149-6..
- Colledge, J. J.; Warlow, Ben (2006) [1969]. Ships of the Royal Navy: The Complete Record of All Fighting Ships of the Royal Navy from the 15th Century to the Present (3rd Rev ed.). London: Chatham Publishing. ISBN 978-1-86176-281-8. OCLC 67375475.
- Critchley, Mike (1992). British Warships Since 1945: Part 5: Frigates. Liskeard, UK: Maritime Press. ISBN 0-907771-13-0.
- Elliott, Peter (1977). Allied Escort Ships of World War II: A Complete Survey. London: Macdonald and Jane's. ISBN 0-356-08401-9.
- Friedman, Norman (2008). British Destroyers & Frigates: The Second World War and After. Barnsley, UK: Seaforth Publishing. ISBN 978-1-84832-015-4.
- Gardiner, Robert; Chesneau, Roger, eds. (1980). Conway's All The World's Fighting Ships 1922–1946. London: Conway Maritime Press. ISBN 0-85177-146-7.
- Goodwin, Norman (2007). Castle Class Corvettes: An Account of the Service of the Ships and of their Ships' Companies. Liskeard, UK: Maritime Books. ISBN 978-1-904459-279.
