= HMS Hadleigh Castle =

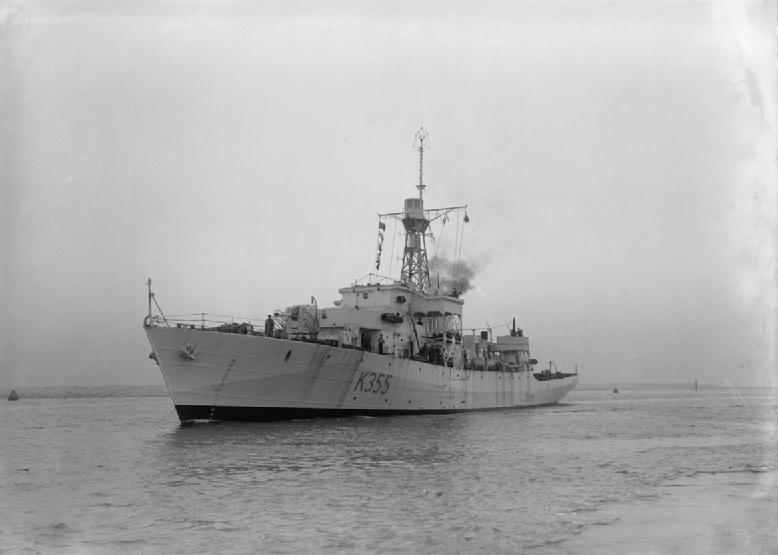
- Hadleigh Castle in September 1943

History

United Kingdom
- Name: Hadleigh Castle
- Namesake: Hadleigh Castle
- Builder: Smiths Dock Company
- Laid down: 4 April 1943
- Launched: 21 June 1943
- Commissioned: 18 September 1943
- Decommissioned: 1946
- Identification: Pennant number: K355
- Fate: Scrapped, January 1959

General characteristics (as built)
- Class & type: Castle-class corvette
- Displacement: 1,010 long tons (1,030 t) (standard)
- Length: 252 ft (76.8 m)
- Beam: 33 ft (10.1 m)
- Draught: 13 ft 9 in (4.2 m) (deep load)
- Installed power: 2 Admiralty 3-drum boilers; 2,880 ihp (2,150 kW)
- Propulsion: 1 shaft, 1 triple-expansion engine
- Speed: 16.5 knots (30.6 km/h; 19.0 mph)
- Range: 6,500 nmi (12,000 km; 7,500 mi) at 15 knots (28 km/h; 17 mph)
- Complement: 99
- Sensors & processing systems: Type 145 and Type 147 ASDIC; Type 272 search radar; HF/DF radio direction finder
- Armament: 1 × QF 4 in (102 mm) DP gun; 2 × twin, 2 × single 20 mm (0.8 in) AA guns; 1 × 3-barrel Squid anti-submarine mortar; 1 × depth charge rail and 2 throwers; 15 depth charges

HMS Hadleigh Castle (K355) was the lead ship for her class of corvettes built for Britain's Royal Navy during the Second World War. Completed in 1943, she helped to escort several convoys to Canada later that year and into early 1944. The ship was switched to the UK-Gibraltar run in April 1944 and remained on that assignment until after the surrender of Germany in May 1945. Hadleigh Castle was stationed in Gibraltar for most of the rest of the year and into 1946. She was reduced to reserve in 1946 and mostly remained in that status until she was sold for scrap in 1958.

== Design and description ==
The Castle-class corvette was a stretched version of the preceding Flower class, enlarged to improve seakeeping and to accommodate modern weapons. The ships displaced 1,010 long tons (1,030 t) at standard load and 1,510 long tons (1,530 t) at deep load. The ships had an overall length of 252 feet (76.8 m), a beam of 36 feet 9 inches (11.2 m) and a deep draught of 13 feet 9 inches (4.2 m). They were powered by a four-cylinder triple-expansion steam engine driving one propeller shaft using steam provided by two Admiralty three-drum boilers. The engine developed a total of 2,880 indicated horsepower (2,150 kW) and gave a speed of 16.5 knots (30.6 km/h; 19.0 mph). The Castles carried enough fuel oil to give them a range of 6,500 nautical miles (12,000 km; 7,500 mi) at 15 knots (28 km/h; 17 mph). The ships' complement was 99 officers and ratings.

The Castle-class ships were equipped with a single QF 4-inch (102 mm) Mk XVI dual-purpose gun forward, but their primary weapon was their single three-barrel Squid anti-submarine mortar. This was backed up by one depth charge rail and two throwers for 15 depth charges. The ships were fitted with two twin and a pair of single mounts for 20-millimetre (0.8 in) Oerlikon AA guns. Provision was made for a further four single mounts if needed. They were equipped with Type 145Q and Type 147B ASDIC sets to detect submarines by reflections from sound waves beamed into the water. A Type 272 search radar and a HF/DF radio direction finder rounded out the Castles' sensor suite.

== Construction and career ==
Hadleigh Castle was ordered on 19 December 1942 and was laid down at Smiths Dock at their shipyard in Middlesbrough on 4 April 1922. The ship was launched on 21 June 1943, and completed on 18 September. After several weeks of training in Western Approaches Command's Anti-Submarine Training School at Tobermory, Mull, she joined Escort Group C4. She was part of the escort of Convoy ON 215 from the Clyde to Canada from December 1943 to January 1944. Hadleigh Castle demonstrated the Squid to the US Navy later that month. On the return voyage escorting Convoy HX 277 she joined Escort Group B5 in February. The group made one more round trip to Canada, escorting Convoys ON 225 and HX 282 in February–March, with Hadleigh Castle's captain (nautical)| commanding the group. After those convoys, a new officer took over the group and it was retasked with the UK-Gibraltar run. This lasted until September when the group was reorganized and redesignated as the 31st Escort Group. Its mission was to patrol the Western Approaches and support other escort groups as needed. Hadleigh Castle was refitted in Bristol from 22 January – 24 February 1945 and resumed her duties until the end of May 1945.

The ship was deployed to Gibraltar from 28 June to mid-1946 when she returned to the UK and was placed in reserve. Hadleigh Castle was refitted in 1949–1950 at Birkenhead and was placed in reserve again at Harwich upon its completion. The ship was sold for scrap in 1958 and arrived at Gateshead in January 1959 to begin demolition.

== Bibliography ==
- Campbell, N. J. M. (1980). "Great Britain (including Empire Forces)". In Chesneau, Roger (ed.). Conway's All the World's Fighting Ships 1922–1946. Conway Maritime Press. pp. 2–85. ISBN 0-85177-146-7.
- Colledge, J. J.; Warlow, Ben & Bush, Steve (2020). Ships of the Royal Navy: The Complete Record of all Fighting Ships of the Royal Navy from the 15th Century to the Present (5th revised and updated ed.). Seaforth Publishing. ISBN 978-1-5267-9327-0.
- Goodwin, Norman; compiled by (2007). Castle Class Corvettes: An Account of the Service of the Ships and of Their Ships' Companies. Maritime Books. ISBN 978-1-904459-27-9.
- Lenton, H. T. (1998). British & Empire Warships of the Second World War. Naval Institute Press. ISBN 1-55750-048-7.
