= Chelosin =

Steam-powered passenger-freighter vessel

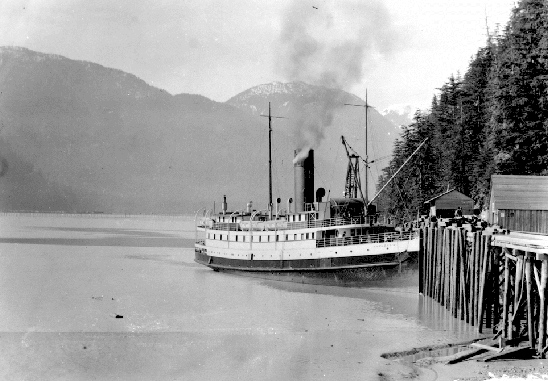
- Chelosin at Stewart, BC in 1912.

History
- Name: Chilosun
- Owner: Union Steamship Company of British Columbia
- Route: coastal British Columbia
- Builder: Dublin Dockyard Co.; MacColl & Co. Ltd.
- Cost: £28,850 ($140,500).
- Maiden voyage: February 24, 1912
- In service: 1912
- Out of service: 1949
- Identification: Canada registry #130805
- Fate: Wrecked, then salvaged and scrapped.

General characteristics
- Type: Steel-hulled coastal steamship
- Tonnage: 1,134 gross tons; 597 registered tons.
- Length: 175.5 ft (53.5 m)
- Beam: 35.1 ft (10.7 m)
- Depth: 14.0 ft (4.3 m) depth of hold
- Installed power: twin triple-expansion steam engines generating 1,420 IHP
- Propulsion: twin propeller
- Speed: 14 knots max.; 12.5 knots avg.
- Capacity: Licensed for 191 passengers; 150 tons cargo.
- Crew: 38
- Notes: The popular name for this vessel was the Charlie Olson.

Chelosin was a steel-hulled, steam-powered passenger-freighter vessel that served in coastal British Columbia from 1911 to 1949, under the ownership of the Union Steamship Company of British Columbia.

== Nomenclature ==
Chelosin was said to have been a word of the First Nations meaning "open to the mouth", that is, having a navigable entrance.

== Design and construction ==
In late 1910, Union Steamship Co., then under direction of Gordon T. Legg (1852–1940), ordered construction of Chelosin from Dublin Dockyard Co. The ship was to be built for a cost of £28,850, then about $140,500. The money was raised by the sale at par of 30,000 shares stock in the corporation.

Chelosin had a gross tonnage of 1,133 and net tonnage of 597. The ship was 175.5 feet long, with a beam of 35.1 feet and depth of hold of 14.0 feet. The ship could accommodate 66 passengers in first class berths, two berths per stateroom, and carry 95 more in deck bunks.

Overall the ship had a license to transport 191 passengers total in coastal trips. The ship was designed to be operated with a crew of 38. Cargo capacity was 150 tons, in a single forward hold that was served by two 34-foot derricks that could lift four tons of cargo. There were four decks on the ship.

The staterooms, which were mostly on two decks, called the "awning" and the "shade" decks, had sliding windows, and were paneled in oak. Each stateroom had running water, in some cases both hot and cold which was considered relatively luxurious at the time. Some staterooms had an extra folding bed, called a "cabinet bed" which doubled for use as a day-time settee. There was an observation room with large windows on the forward end of the top deck, and on the aft end of the same deck there was a ladies saloon. There was also a separate smoking room on the upper deck, and a dining saloon on the main deck.

== Completion and delivery ==
Once the hull was completed in Dublin, it was towed to Belfast, where twin triple-expansion steam engines manufactured by MacColl & Co., Ltd were installed to drive the ship's twin propellers.

On September 25, 1911, the ship was taken out for its first trial run on Belfast Lough, and a speed of 14 knots was recorded over the measured mile with no vibration. Final outfitting took another three weeks, and on October 17, 1911, under the command of Capt. J.W. Starkey, the ship left Belfast for the voyage around Cape Horn to British Columbia. In preparation for the voyage, the cabin windows fore and aft had been boarded up.

The ship encountered no major problems and ran well on the delivery voyage, stopping at Montevideo and at San Francisco, where additional ballast was taken on. Chelosin arrived at Vancouver, BC on December 28, 1911.

The official Canadian registry number was 130805.

== Entry into passenger operations ==
On February 24, 1912, Chelosin was taken out on a ceremonial first cruise in Vancouver Harbor. Top company officials and many civic leaders were on board. Later that same day, under Capt. John Cowper (b.1852) the ship began its first service run, bound for the Skeena River, Prince Rupert, Port Simpson, Nass River and Goose Bay (later known as Anyox).

Originally coal-powered, in 1912 Chelosin was converted to burn oil, with the company calculating that the high cost of conversion would be outweighed by the ease and cleanliness of refueling, as well as the time that could be saved by not having to load coal from a bunker. Shortly after entering service, Chelosin grounded on the Skeena River, which required the ship to be withdrawn from service for significant repairs. This grounding caused the company to protest to the Canadian government about the lack of navigational markers in the Skeena River.

In the spring of 1913, Chelosin, together with two other company vessels, was engaged in service to logging camps along Johnstone Strait and north to Kingcome Inlet. Chelosin continued in this type of service, becoming an essential transportation link for the coastal logging industry.

The popular name for this vessel was the Charlie Olson. One captain of Chelosin was Jack Edwards, who would cut down trees for exercise when the ship was docked at Powell River.

In 1938, Chelosin was withdrawn from service for a substantial reworking. A large part of the hull was replated and the passenger accommodations were extensively modernized.

== War time operations ==
War was declared in September 1939. All the ships of the Union company operated under limited running lights at night, and all portholes were blacked out. Radio silence was maintained, and later anti-mine equipment and anti-aircraft guns would be added to the ships. In 1942, Chelosin was assigned to run biweekly from Vancouver to Port Hardy, which was the main port for Quatsino Sound, Port Alice, and a nearby Royal Canadian Air Force base.

== Post-war service ==
Changes in the company's fleet just after the end of World War II resulted in just three of the company's ships being able to run on the northern routes and service the logging areas, these were Chelosin and the company's newer and larger vessels Cardena and Catala.

== Final wreck ==
On November 6, 1949, while inbound from Cortez Island and Westview and proceeding in a thick fog under Capt. Alfred Aspinall, Chelosin swerved off course to avoid other marine traffic, and struck a rock about 100 yards west of Siwash Rock, in Stanley Park near the entrance to Vancouver Harbor. This was near to where the pioneer steamship Beaver had been finally wrecked. The ship struck ground at about 8:00 pm. By 9:20 pm, all passengers were safely evacuated to the nearby shore, along with some pets and luggage. Some were taken by bus into Vancouver, but others flagged down private cars or taxis for rides.

Efforts were made to bring the ship off the rock, but these were halted on November 12, 1949, and, two days later, the underwriters declared that the value of the vessel would not justify further expense to refloat the ship. The hulk was sold to Victor David, who ran a food processing firm, reportedly for $1,600. Two days later, David was able to have the holes in the hull patched, pull the vessel free, and have it beached in North Vancouver, where he planned to convert it to a food processing plant. This was considered a salvage feat by the local marine community. The city apparently needed to approve this conversion. It did not, and so David sold the hulk for scrap in 1951. The hulk was purchased by a San Francisco firm for $25,000, and towed south to that city where it was finally dismantled.
