= Camosun (steamship) =

Steamship built in 1904

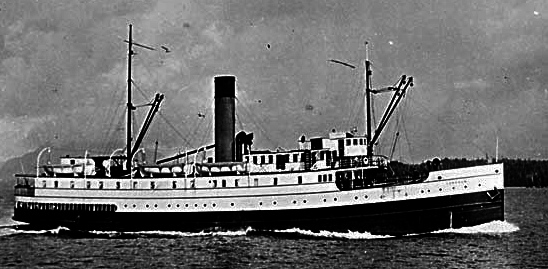
- Camosun I circa 1930

History
- Name: Camosun
- Route: coastal British Columbia
- Builder: Bow McLachlan & Co., Paisley, Scotland
- In service: 1905
- Identification: Canada registry #121204
- Fate: Sold for scrap 1935

General characteristics
- Type: coastal steamship
- Tonnage: 1,369 gross tons; 793 registered tons.
- Length: 192.7 ft (58.7 m)
- Beam: 35.2 ft (10.7 m)
- Depth: 17.9 ft (5.5 m) depth of hold
- Decks: three
- Installed power: twin triple-expansion steam engines, 224 NHP, two boilers, fire box originally coal-fired, later converted to burn oil.
- Propulsion: single propeller
- Speed: 14 knots maximum; 12 knots average.
- Capacity: Licensed for 199 passengers (68 in staterooms; 120 on deck); approx. 300 tons cargo capacity
- Crew: 38

Camosun was a steamship built in 1904 in Paisley, Scotland, which served in British Columbia.

== Design and construction ==
Camosun was the first passenger-freighter ship ordered by the Union Steamship Company of British Columbia. The vessel was intended to compete against the ships of two rival concerns, Princess Victoria of the Canadian Pacific, and Vadso and Venture of the Boscowitz Company.

Construction on the vessel began in the spring of 1904 at the Bow McLachlan & Co. shipyard in Paisley, Scotland. Later it was said that construction on Camosun had begun with the objective of completing a tugboat for service on the Hooghly River in India, but when that contract fell through, the ship was completed to the order of the Union Steamship Company. The official Canadian registry number was 121204.

Camosun had a gross tonnage of 1,369 and net tonnage of 793. The ship was 192.7 feet (58.7 m) long, with a beam of 35.2 feet (10.7 m) and depth of hold of 17.9 feet (5.5 m). The hull was strongly built of steel, with a double bottom in the bow and the stern. The power plant consisted of twin triple-expansion steam engines, rated at 224 nominal horsepower. Steam was generated by two boilers. These were originally coal-fired, and later converted to oil. The ship had a speed maximum speed of 14 knots (26 km/h) but generally cruised at 12 knots (22 km/h).

The ship had 54 first class berths and 120 deck bunks. The main first class cabins were located on the upper deck together with lounges fore and aft. There was a smoking room as well as additional cabins on the aft top deck, on which the pilot house and officers' quarters were located on fore part of the top deck. The ship had a dining saloon on the main deck. The ship had a cargo capacity of about 300 tons.

== Delivery ==
Camosun left Troon, Scotland on February 19, 1905, under the command of Captain B.L. Johnson for delivery to British Columbia. The ship initially proceeded to Kingston, Jamaica, where command was changed over to Capt. C.B. Smith. The ship then proceeded around Cape Horn to the west coast of North America, where the vessel halted at San Francisco, California, for one month to caulk the decks. Camosun finally arrived in Vancouver, British Columbia on June 20, 1905. Repairs necessary to Camosun following the delivery voyage brought Union Steamship into litigation with the ship's builders.

== Operations ==
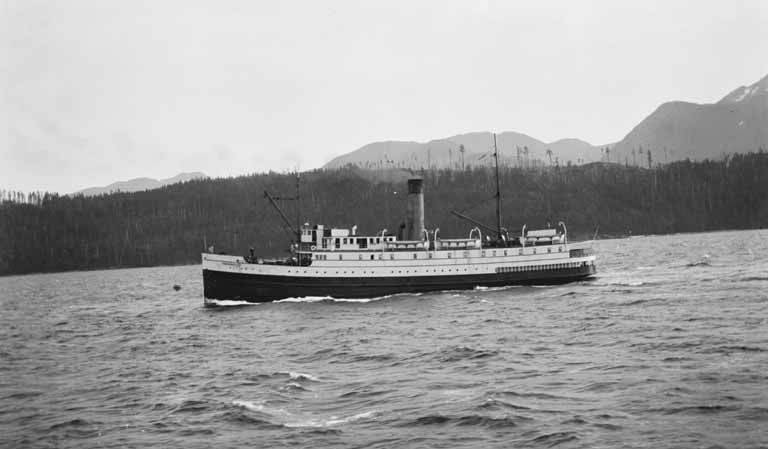
Camosun in the Inside Passage near Vancouver, British Columbia, ca. 1912

Camosun became the flagship of the Union Steamship fleet, and was placed into service by the Union Steamship Company on July 4, 1905. The vessel had a license to carry 199 passengers on coastal voyages, and had a crew of 38. The initial route on which the vessel was placed ran from Vancouver to Stewart, British Columbia via Alert Bay, Bella Coola, Bella Bella, Port Essington, the Skeena River, Port Simpson and the Nass River. Prince Rupert did not then exist, and the ship anchored at a landing float at Stewart, as no wharf had yet been built there.

When Prince Rupert was founded, in 1906, Camosun was the first passenger ship to call at the new port. The harbor at Prince Rupert had not been fully surveyed, and in July 1906, Camosun struck a rock in the harbor. The vessel would have sunk, but was saved by the double-bottom design. As a result, service was disrupted by the need transfer Camosun to Victoria, British Columbia, where the vessel underwent repairs at Joseph Spratt's shipyard.

Within 18 months of entering service, Camosun was equipped with a Marconi wireless transmitter, becoming the first vessel on the Canadian Pacific coast to be so equipped.

The first master of Camosun in operations was Frank Saunders. Echo location using the ships horn was used to navigate by night or in foggy weather, and for his skill in this, Frank Saunders was known as the "fog wizard". Robert Batchelor, an experienced ocean-going seaman, took over as master when Captain Saunders left to command the ships of Canada National.

The fish packing industry was increasing in importance when Camosun came into service. Every spring Camosun transported several hundred Chinese, Japanese, and Indiana workers to the twenty-five packing plants that were on Smith's Inlet, Rivers Inlet and the Skeena and Nass rivers. The ship also transported out packed and frozen fish during the peak of the canning season, which ran from July to October. Once in October 1907, Camosun returned to Vancouver with 6,000 cases of canned salmon, the largest such shipment ever landed at Vancouver up to that time.

Camosun was considered a fast and reliable vessel of the time, being able to make the run from Prince Rupert to Vancouver in 45 hours under Captain Saunders.

In the fall of 1906, Camosun transported the crew of the wrecked sternwheeler Pheasant from the Skeena River to Vancouver. Pheasant had been lost when the provincial government chartered the steamboat to clear the channel in the Skeena. On November 21, 1906, the sternwheeler's engines had broken down, and the powerless vessel drifted upon some rocks in mid-stream. Having reached shore, the Pheasant's crew was picked up by Camosun.

In 1907, there were gold strikes in the Portland Canal area. Servicing these strikes became a profitable business for the Camosun. In 1909, the Union Steamship company acquired a mail contract. Other cargo carried at this time included fifty head of cattle carried on the foredeck.

In 1912, Camosun was converted from coal-fired to oil-fired boilers, the high cost of which was offset by the ease and cleanliness of refueling compared to the use of coal bunkers.

In early January 1913, Camosun proceeded to Van Anda, on Texada Island to transport 71 survivors from the capsize of Cheslakee, another Union steamship.

== Grounding ==
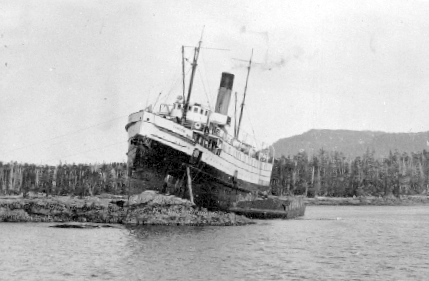
Camosun ashore on Digby Island, March, 1916.

On March 7, 1916, at 2:00 am, while en route to Masset, Camosun under the command of Capt. A.E. Dickson, was moving at one-quarter speed through a heavy snow storm. The ship went aground near Prince Rupert harbor, at Digby Island. At low tide the vessel was completely clear of the water. The seventeen passengers on board were removed by rescue vessels which had come from Prince Rupert. To lighten the ship to allow it to float free at high tide, cargo bound for the Queen Charlotte Islands, including 100 tons of coal, was off-loaded into smaller transshipment vessels. Camosun's strongly built hull allowed the ship to remain on the rock without damage until March 17, when the ship was finally got off under its own power. The damage from the grounding turned out to be minor.

== Later service and fate ==
Camosun continued in service. On January 23, 1923, Camosun sustained minor damage in a collision with the Canadian Pacific's coastal liner Princess Beatrice. The collision occurred off Kingcome Point in the Grenville Channel as Camosun was proceeding southbound from Prince Rupert. Damage to Camosun was minor, and both ships continued their voyages afterwards.

In another incident in the same winter, Camosun went aground briefly in a fog near Brockton Point in Vancouver's Stanley Park. The Vancouver Fire Department responded to the scene, and removed passengers by use of their fire ladders. Camosun was a heavy vessel with a lot of momentum, and had to be slowed down well before landings. Shortly after World War I, when Camosun was under the command of a captain who was unfamiliar with the vessel, the captain failed to give the order to reduce speed in time, and so Camosun crashed through a dock at the Rivers Inlet cannery, going right up into the cannery building itself.

In 1935 Camosun was sold for scrap.
