= Union Steamship Company of British Columbia =

Pioneer firm on coastal British Columbia

Union Steamship Company of British Columbia, Ltd.
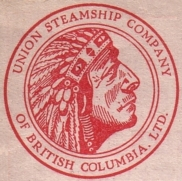

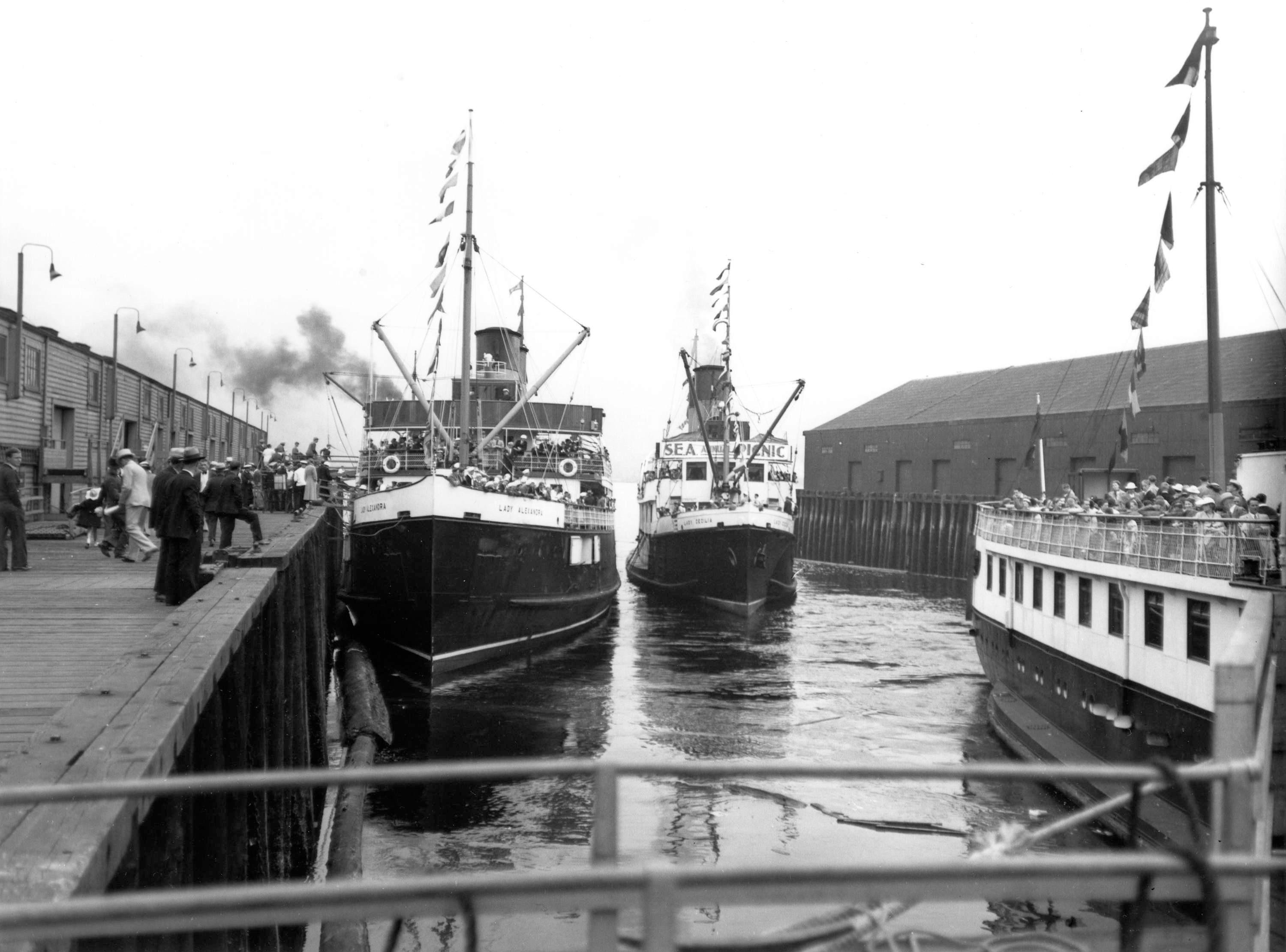
- Picnic excursion for Spencer's Employee Association - Lady Alexandra, Lady Cecilia, and Lady Cynthia.
- Company type: Corporation
- Industry: Shipping
- Founded: 1889 in Vancouver, BC
- Defunct: 1948
- Successor: Canadian Pacific Steamships Co.
- Area served: Coastal British Columbia

The Union Steamship Company of British Columbia was a pioneer firm on coastal British Columbia. It was founded in November 1889 by John Darling, a director of the Union Steamship Company of New Zealand, and nine local businessmen. The company began by offering local service on Burrard Inlet near Vancouver and later expanded to servicing the entire British Columbia coast.

The Union Steamship Company was bought out by the Canadian Pacific Steamship Company in 1948. The SS Noronic fire in Toronto forced the Federal Maritime Department to change marine regulations regarding wooden passenger vessels, while the nature of the BC coastal fleet changed more to freight and a tug and barge operation. The Union Steamships ran until 1958 when a strike finished the fleet.

== Company organized ==
Union Steamship had its origins in the Burrard’s Inlet Towing Company, whose original principals were Alfred N.C. King, Hugh Stalker, John Morton, and Capt. Donald McPhaiden. The fleet upon formation consisted of three smaller wooden-hulled steamers: Leonora, Senator, and, the largest of the three, the steam tug Skidegate.

== 1890 to 1896 ==
Cutch, 324 GT, 180 ft (54.86 m), was the first steamer the company acquired after its initial incorporation. Cutch had been built at Hull, England in 1884. Capt. William Webster, one of the founders of Union Steamship, located Cutch in India, where it had been in service as a maharaja’s yacht. Webster purchased the steamer with funds raised in England by John Darling. Webster brought Cutch from India to British Columbia, arriving in Vancouver in June 1890. Cutch was placed on the run from Vancouver to Nanaimo, British Columbia.

Capilano 1 and Coquitlam were built in Glasgow, Scotland and shipped to British Columbia in a knocked-down condition, then reassembled on the beach near present-day Stanley Park. Capilano 1 was launched in December 1891, and Coquitlam followed in April 1892.

== 1897 to 1906 ==
=== Gold rush transportation ===
In 1897 the Klondike Gold Rush created a demand for transportation. To meet the demand, both Capilano 1 and Coquitlam were outfitted with crude berths for passengers, and then run north to the mouth of the Yukon River. Capilano 1 left in late July and Coquitlam in early August. They were the first British vessels to proceed directly to the mouth of the Yukon from Vancouver.

In 1898 Union Steamship placed Capilano 1, Coquitlam, and Cutch in service to Skagway and Dyea, in southeast Alaska. Skagway and Dyea were the principal disembarkation point for traffic bound for the Klondike gold fields. These three steamers remained in the Skagway/Dyea service in 1899.

=== Skidegate scrapped and Cutch wrecked ===
The company’s old steam tug Skidegate was scrapped in Vancouver in 1900. Also in 1900, the company’s first steamer purchase, Cutch, was wrecked, on August 24, and sold for salvage.

=== Coutli and Camosun added to fleet ===
In 1904 the company built the steam tug Coutli, 99 GT, 71.4 ft (21.76 m) LOA, for use in log towing service for British Columbia Mills Co.

In 1905 the company placed Camosun into service. Camosun, 1,369 GT, 192 ft (58.52 m) LOA, was a steel-hulled modern vessel built at Paisley, Scotland by the Bow, McLachlan concern. Camosun could carry 54 persons overnight, with room for 120 deck passengers. Camosun arrived from Scotland in Vancouver on June 30, 1905 and was placed in service on a weekly route to Prince Rupert, BC under Capt. F. Saunders.

== 1907 to 1911 ==
=== Cowichen, Cheslakee, and Inlander added to fleet ===
In 1908 Union Steamship added Cowichan, 962 GT, 157 ft (47.85 m) LOA, to its fleet. Cowichan, an all-steel vessel with twin propellers, was built in Troon, Scotland by Ailsa Shipbuilding Co. Cowichan was licensed to carry 165 passengers and 125 tons of freight. It was used in the company’s service to logging camps.

Cheslakee, 526 GT, 132 ft (40.23 m) LOA, was completed for the company in 1910 by an Irish concern, Dublin Dockyard Co. Built to the highest standards, the twin-propeller all-steel Cheslakee was intended to run out of Vancouver in passenger service on northern routes. Cheslakee could carry only a limited amount of freight, which was restricted to perishable items such as butter, fruit and fish. Passenger accommodations were large for a vessel of this size.

Also in 1910 the company invested in the river sternwheeler Inlander. Inlander ran for three seasons, 1910 to 1912, on the Skeena River.

=== Welsford & Company buys control of the company ===
In 1911 Welsford & Company, a Liverpool shipping line, purchased a controlling interest in Union Steamship Co. Also in 1911, on September 23, the Welsford company purchased the Boscowitz Steamship Co., Ltd., of Victoria, BC, for $160,000, half in cash and half in Union Steamship stock.

== 1912 to 1918 ==
The start of World War I caused economic disruption and a fall off in the British Columbia salmon fishery, impacting the company’s operations so much that one-half of its fleet was taken out of service. This soon changed, when wartime production demands generated an unprecedented surge in business.

=== Loss of ships in 1913 and 1914 ===
On June 7, 1913, disaster struck when Cheslakee capsized at its dock in Van Anda, on Texada Island, drowning several people.

The company lost two ships in 1914. On February 3, 1914 the company’s freighter Vadso, running a few hours out of Port Simpson, struck an uncharted rock, caught fire, and sank. There were no casualties among the crew, but they had to row twelve miles to the Arrandale Cannery, from whence they were able to return to Vancouver on board another company freighter, Venture. Later in 1914 Capilano 1 stranded in Malaspina Strait and became a total loss, but also with no casualties to anyone on board.

=== Purchase of the All-Red Line ===
The All-Red Line had been running local service from Vancouver to Powell River with the steamers Selma and Santa Maria. The All-Red Line also owned property at Selma Park, on the Sunshine Coast of British Columbia, near the town of Sechelt. In 1917 Union Steamship purchased the All-Red Line, including all of its floating equipment and the property at Selma Park. Union Steamship renamed Selma as Chasina, and Santa Maria as Chilco. Union Steamship later developed Selma Park as an excursion destination resort.

== 1919 to 1924 ==
=== Post-war expansion program ===
After World War I, the company, under manager Ernest H Beasley (or Beasley) (d.1920), began an expansion program. The automobile had not yet been able reach most of the points served by the company’s steamers. The company carried freight and passengers to new pulp mills at Powell River, Ocean Falls, and Swanson Bay. The company also provided service to the Granby Copper Mine at Anyox, the gold mine at Surf Inlet (now Port Belmont), and the many coastal logging camps.

=== Death of company manager Beazley ===
There were periodic labor disputes in the Canadian shipping business after World War 1. In May 1920 company manager Ernest H. Beazley was killed in an airplane crash at Minoru Park. Beazley had just settled a labor strike, and was taking a brief vacation. John Barnsley (d.1924), who had joined the company when the Boscowitz shipping concern was acquired, then became general manager, and R.A.H. Welsford came to British Columbia from Liverpool to act as managing director.

=== Two freighters purchased ===
In 1919 Union Steamship bought the freighter British Columbia from Griffiths, renamed it Chilliwack, and used it to replace the 1891 steamer Comox. Comox was first resold for scrap, but soon sold again to a Central American concern and renamed Alejandro.

The company also had the steel freighter Chilkoot 1 built in 1920 by Wallace Shipbuilding Co. Chilkoot 1 remained in service for a long time, being operated in 1966 by Northland Navigation Co. under the name Alaska Prince.

=== Day excursion business developed ===
Union Steamship continued to develop the day excursion business which had begun in 1917 with the acquisition of the All-Red line. In 1920, the company had the wooden steamer Capilano 2 built at B.C. Marine Ways, using engines from the Puget Sound steamer Washington. Capilano 2 was intended to serve the resort at Selma Park, formerly owned by the All-Red Line.

Lady Alexandra, completed at Montrose, Scotland was the most important addition to shipping in the Pacific Northwest in 1924. Alexandra was a two-stack steamer of 1,396 GT and 230 feet, capable of carrying 1200 passengers on day excursions. During the approximately 30 years Alexandra was in service, the steamer seldom left Howe Sound, and was mostly used during the summer months, including especially cruises to Bowen Island.

=== Terminal Steam Navigation purchased ===
In December 1920, Union Steamships bought the Terminal Steam Navigation Company from the veteran shipping man Capt. John Andrew “Jack” Cates for a price of about $250,000. The sale included the Bowen Island property of Terminal Steam, the wooden steamer Bowena, and the route up East Howe Sound to Squamish.

The deal was to have included the steamer Ballena, but before the sale was finalized, Ballena was destroyed by fire while alongside the Union dock in Vancouver, killing a coal stoker. Bowena also sustained $15,000 damage from the same fire. Following repair, Bowena was renamed Cheam, and placed in service on the Bowen Island route in May, 1921.

=== Cardena added to fleet ===
In 1923 Cardena 1559 GT 223 ft, was completed at Glasgow, Scotland for Union Steamship, which placed the new vessel on a route running from Vancouver to Prince Rupert, and then to Stewart, British Columbia.

== 1925 to 1929 ==
=== Celicia, Cynthia, and Catala added to fleet ===
In 1925 Union Steamships added three new steamers to its fleet, Lady Cecilia, Lady Cynthia, and Catala. All were built by the same firm, Coaster Construction Co, at Montrose, Scotland. Catala was an entirely new vessel, intended for northern service.

Cecilia and Cynthia had been rebuilt from Royal Navy minesweepers. They each had to be sponsoned out to improve their stability, but this reduced their speed from 19 to 15 knots. Cecilia and Cynthia, each about 950 GT, were fitted to carry 800 passengers and 75 tons of freight on Howe Sound routes and to Powell River. In later years Cynthia received substantial alterations for logging camp service.

=== Collision between Lady Cynthia and Cowichan ===
On December 27, 1925, Lady Cynthia collided with and sank another Union company ship, Cowichan. Lady Cecilia had brought a Christmas excursion from Powell River to Vancouver. More people wanted to come south than Cecilia could carry, so Harold Brown, the company's general manager, ordered Cynthia to embark an additional 200 passengers, after which Cynthia departed southbound for Vancouver.

Meanwhile, northbound Cowichan encountered fog off Roberts Creek. Knowing Cecilia would be coming, Cowichan’s Captain Robert Wilson, proceeded slowly, listened carefully for Cecilia's whistle. Cecilia passed safely by, but then Wilson was taken by surprise 15 minutes later when Cynthia, under Capt. John Boden appeared out of the fog, colliding with its bow into Cowichan’s amidships.

Boden kept Cynthia’s bow in place to keep Cowichan from sinking. Wilson, the last to leave his ship, first helped all 45 people on Cowichan to board Cynthia When Cecila backed away, Cowichan sank almost immediately.

== 1938 to 1945 ==
=== Waterhouse concern acquired ===
In 1939 Union Steamship bought the ships and freighting interests of the Frank L. Waterhouse Co., which had been in the cannery service business for many years. Vessels acquired were three freighters directly owned by Waterhouse, Northholm, Southholm, and Eastholm, and three more under charter, Gray, Bervin, and Salvor which was same vessel as the company’s old 1891 Coquitlam.

The Waterhouse acquisitions were operated as a separate division of Union Steamships, under the management of R.L. Solloway. Acquisition of the Waterhouse freighters brought the Union Steamship fleet to a total of 16 vessels. At this time, all shipping on the Canadian west coast was operating under war time conditions, meaning blacked-out portholes, minimum lights, radio silence and in many cases, carrying guns manned by naval personnel.

=== Northholm lost in a storm ===
On January 16, 1943, the freighter Northholm was sunk in a storm off the west coast of Vancouver Island. Northholm was struck by heavy seas, and sunk so quickly that nine men went down with the ship. Eight men managed to escape the vessel, but of these, six later drowned, leaving the first officer and a seaman as the only survivors.

== 1946 to 1950 ==
=== Surplus warships acquired and converted ===
After World War II Union Steamships resumed regular weekly service to Ketchikan, Alaska after a lapse of many years, including stops en route at Prince Rupert and Ocean Falls. To serve the route, the company had acquired three British-built corvettes, HMCS Leaside, HMS St. Thomas, and HMS Hespeler, and converted them into civilian passenger vessels Coquitlam 2, Camosun 3, and Chilcotin, respectively. Originally the company intended to run on the route year-round, but winter traffic proved to be insufficient, so in December 1947 the Ketchikan run became seasonal only.

=== Chelosin stranded and sold to salvors ===
On November 4, 1949 Chelosin stranded off Siwash Rock near the entrance to Vancouver Harbor. The company could not pull the ship off, and it was sold to salvors for $1,500. All passengers and crew were safely evacuated from the vessel. Victor David, who had bought Chelosin, surprised everyone when he and a five-man salvage crew were able to quickly refloat the ship and take it into a dock.

== List of vessels ==
Ships of the Union Steamship Company of British Columbia
Name	Reg #	Hull	Type	YB	Where built	Length		GT	Start Yr	End yr	Dsp
Name	Reg #	Hull	Type	YB	Where built	ft	m	GT	Start Yr	End yr	Dsp
Argus (Note: Ex Argo. Built for U.S. Navy. Diesel engines)		steel	frtr	1944	Stockton, CA	153	46.6	517	1950	1953	
Camosun 1 (1904)	121204	steel	psgr	1904	Paisley, SCT	192.7	58.7	1369	1905	1936	L
Camosun 2 (1907) (Note: Purchased from Canadian National Steamship Co. Ex St. Margaret, ex Chieftain, ex Prince Charles.)		steel	psgr	1907	Ayr, SCT	241	73.5	1344	1940	1945	
Camosun 3 (1943) (Note: Built as the corvette HMCS St. Thomas, purchased after World War II and converted to a passenger vessel by Burrard Shipbuilders, in North Vancouver, BC.)		steel	psgr	1943	Middlesbrough, ENG	235.7	71.8	1835	1946	1958	
Capilano 1 (1892) (Note: Struck rock off Texada Island then sank off Savary Island, 1919.)	100203	wood	frtr	1892	Vancouver, BC	120	36.6	231	1892	1915	F
Capilano 2 (1920)	141709	wood	psgr	1920	Victoria, BC	135	41.1	374	1920	1949	L
Capilano 3 (1946)		steel	frtr	1946	Port Arthur, ON	145	44.2	231	1951	1959	
Cardena	150977	steel	psgr	1923	Old Kilpatrick, SCT	227	69.2	1559	1923	1959	L
Cassiar 1 (1901) (Note: Ex J.R. McDonald (hull), built in Ballard, WA, in 1890. Rebuilt in 1901 at Wallace Shipyard, False Creek, Vancouver, BC. Dimensions are for the 1901 rebuild.)	103472	wood	psgr	1901	Ballard, WA	121	36.9	598	1901	1925	T
Cassiar 1 (1910) (Note: Purchased from CN Steamships. Ex Amethyst, ex Prince John.)		steel	psgr	1890	Bowling, SCT	185.3	56.5	905	1940	1949	
Cassiar 2 (1946) (Note: Ex Ottawa Page, ex Blue Peter II.)	176563	steel	frtr	1946	North Vancouver, BC	214.1	65.3	1377	1951	1959	
Catala	152822	steel	psgr	1925	Montrose, SCT	218	66.4	1476	1925	1958	T
Chasina (Note: Converted from steam yacht St. Cecilia, previous to Union Steamship acquisition was operated as Selma by All-Red line. Disappeared at sea in 1931.)	85075	iron	psgr	1881	Glasgow, SCT	141.8	43.2	258	1917	1925	T
Cheakamus (Note: Rebuilt from salvaged Cheslakee.)	130309	steel	psgr	1913	North Vancouver, BC	145.3	44.3	689	1913	1942	T-US
Cheam (Note: Ex City of Nanaimo, ex Bowena. Badly damaged by a fire on Apr 20, 1923, converted to a floating dormitory, and then dismantled in 1926.)	96995	wood	psgr	1891	Vancouver, BC	137	41.8	393	1920	1923	C-S
Chehalis (Note: Sunk in a collision in Vancouver First Narrows on Jul 21, 1906 with Princess Victoria. Eight persons lives lost.)	103065	wood	tow	1897	Vancouver, BC	59	18.0	54	1897	1906	S
Chelan. (Note: Ex Veta C. Built as a warship for the U.S. Navy.)			frtr	1944	Bellingham, WA	148	45.1	541	1952	1954	
Chelohsin (Note: Wrecked on Apr 11, 1949 at Vancouver, BC. Total loss and abandoned to underwriters.)	130805	steel	psgr	1890	Dublin, IR	175.5	53.5	1134	1911	1949	W
Chenega (Note: Ex lighthouse tender Rose, ex Northern Express. Built as a steamer, converted to diesel in 1954.)			frtr	1916	Seattle, WA	129.3	39.4	381	1954	1959	
Cheslakee (Note: Capsized at the dock at Van And a, BC, on January 13, 1913, killing seven people. Raised, rebuilt, and renamed Cheakamus.)	130309	steel	genl	1910	Dublin, IR	132	40.2	526	1910	1913	F
Chilco (Note: Built as steam yacht Santa Maria. Rebuilt in 1917. Renamed Lady Pam in 1935, ended up being used as a breakwater.)	87034	steel	psgr	1944	Glasgow, SCT	151	46.0	305	1917	1935	RN
Chilcotin (Note: Ex HMCS Hespeler, a Castle-class corvette.)		steel	psgr	1943	Leith, SCT	235.7	71.8	1837	1947	1958	
Chilkoot 1 (1920 (Note: In operation as late as 1966, as the motor vessel Alaska Prince.)	141710	steel	frtr	1919	North Vancouver, BC	173	52.7	756	1920	1934	T
Chilkoot 2 (1946)		steel	frtr	1946	Victoria, BC	214.1	65.3	1336	1946	1957	
Chilliwack 1 (1919) (Note: Ex Onyx, ex British Columbia. Acquired from Coastwise Steamship and Barge Co. in 1919.)	119063	steel	frtr	1903	Bowling, SCT	170.7	52.0	557	1919	1926	T
Chilliwack 2 (1927) (Note: Ex Ardgarvel. Transferred to the Marianas Islands in 1954.)	137049		genl		Port Glasgow, SCT	200.3	61.1	834	1927	1954	T
Chilliwack 3 (1954) (Note: Ex Island King. Converted to diesel power and renamed in 1954.)			frtr	1920	Brevik, Norway	165.1	50.3	591	1954	1959	
Comox 1 (1891) (Note: Built in Glasgow, Scotland, then disassembled and shipped to British Columbia, and reassembled at Coal Harbor, Vancouver, BC. Comox 1 was the first steel vessel assembled in British Columbia. McCurdy, at 306. Later rebuilt as motor vessel and renamed Alejandro after 1919 sale to Central America owners.)	100202	steel	psgr	1891	Glasgow, SCT	101	30.8	101	1891	1919	T
Comox 2 (1924) (Note: Diesel powered.)			psgr	1924	North Vancouver, BC	54	16.5	54	1924	1943	
Coquitlam 1 (1892) (Note: Built in Glasgow, Scotland, then disassembled and shipped to British Columbia, and reassembled at Coal Harbor, Vancouver, BC. Sold to Bervin Steamship Co. in August 1923, then returned to Union Steamship Co. control as Bervin, with purchase of Waterhouse concern in 1939. Sold again to Canadian Fishing Co. in 1950 and beached in 1959 at Malcolm Island to be used as a breakwater.)	100203	steel	psgr	1891	Glasgow, SCT	120	36.6	256	1892	1923	T
Coquitlam 2 (1946) (Note: Ex HMCS Leaside, a Castle-class corvette.)		steel	psgr	1944	Middlesbrough, ENG	235.6	71.8	1835	1946	1958	
Coutli	116775	wood	tow	1904	Vancouver, BC	71.4	21.8	99	1904	1910	T
Cowichan (Note: Launched as Cariboo. Sunk in collision with Lady Cynthia on December 27, 1925.)	126210	steel	psgr	1908	Troon, SCT	156.1	47.6	961	1908	1925	S
Cutch (Note: Wrecked south of Juneau on August 24, 1900, and released to underwriters as total loss.Transferred to United States in 1901, renamed Jessie Banning, then sold to Colombia, converted to a warship, and renamed Bogata.)	88178	iron	psgr	1884	Hull, England	180	54.9	324	1890	1900	W
Eastholm (Note: From the Waterhouse fleet.)		wood	frtr	1913	Vancouver, BC	93	28.3	174	1939	1957	O
Island King (Note: Ex Granit, ex Columba. Converted to diesel power and renamed Chilliwack in 1954.)			frtr	1920	Brevik, Norway	165.1	50.3	591	1944	1959	
Lady Alexandra		steel	psgr	1924	Montrose, SCT	225.4	68.7	1396	1924	1953	
Lady Cecilia (Note: Ex HMS Swindon.)		steel	psgr	1919	Androssan, SCT	219.5	66.9	944	1925	1951	
Lady Cynthia (Note: Ex HMS Barnstaple.)		steel	psgr	1919	Androssan, SCT	219.3	66.8	950	1925	1951	
Lady Evelyn (Note: Ex Deerhound.)	109680	steel	psgr	1906	Birkenhead, ENG	189	57.6	588	1923	1936	O
Lady Pam (Note: Ex Chilco.)	202951	prop	gel	1906	Astoria, OR	38	11.6	10	1935	1946	O
Lady Rose	202951	prop	gel	1906	Astoria, OR	38	11.6	10	1937	1951	O
Leonora (Note: Hull built at Moodyville, BC, completed at Victoria, BC. Wrecked at Cracroft Island, 1919.)	80903	wood	tow	1876	Victoria BC	57	17.4	33	1889	1904	
Melmore (Note: Only operated in 1914, laid up until 1916, then sold to Peru and renamed Santa Elena.)	99833	steel	psgr	1892		156	47.5	424	1914	1916	T
Northholm (Note: Ex Robert H. Merrick)		steel	frtr	1924	Bristol, ENG	150.2	45.8	424	1939	1943	
Senator (Note: Deliberately sunk in 1925 in Manson’s Deep, off Bowen Island.)	80902	wood	tow	1881	Moodyville, BC	51.5	15.7	31	1889	1904	T
Skidegate (Note: Dismantled 1897, engines to Chehalis.)	72648	wood	tow	1879	Victoria, BC	76	23.2	37	1889	1897	D
Southholm	141544	steel	frtr	1919	Fort William, ON	200	61.0	1069	1939	1950	
Vadso	124077	steel	frtr	1881	Motala, Sweden	191.2	58.3	908	1911	1914	W
Venture	129475	steel	frtr	1910	Old Kilpatrick, SCT	180.4	55.0	1011	1911	1946	T
Washington (Note: Operated for a few trial excursions only, to Sechelt, in 1918.)		steel	psgr	1906	Dockton, WA	125.5	38.3	306	1918	1918	D
