= Cheakamus (steamship) =

Steamship built in 1913

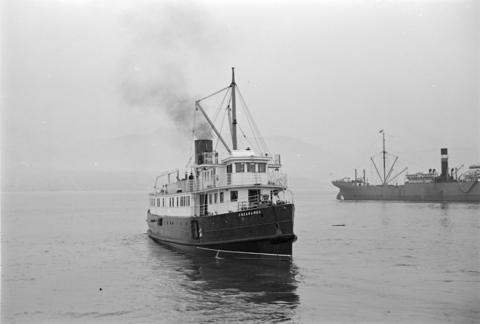
- Cheakamus in Vancouver harbor, 1925

History
- Name: Cheakamus
- Route: coastal British Columbia
- Builder: Wallace Shipyard, North Vancouver
- In service: 1913
- Out of service: 1949
- Identification: Canada registry #130309
- Fate: Scrapped 1949.
- Notes: Rebuilt and lengthened from Cheslakee following capsize. Converted to towboat in 1942

General characteristics
- Type: Coastal steamship
- Tonnage: 689 gross; 403 registered tons.
- Length: 145.3 ft (44.3 m)
- Beam: 28.1 ft (8.6 m)
- Depth: 17.0 ft (5.2 m) depth of hold
- Installed power: triple-expansion steam engine
- Propulsion: single propeller
- Speed: 12 knots maximum; 10.5 knots average.
- Capacity: Licensed for 148 passengers; cargo capacity 120 tons.

Cheakamus was a steamship built in 1913 in North Vancouver, British Columbia. This ship was originally built as the Cheslakee in Scotland. After Cheslakee capsized in 1913, the hulk was raised, lengthened, and placed back into service as Cheakamus.

== Nomenclature ==
Cheakamus was named after the Cheakamus River and Cheakamus Canyon which are north of Howe Sound in British Columbia. The original Skwxwu7mesh (Squamish) name is Chiyakmesh or "Chehagamus", meaning "fish trap."

== Construction ==
In January 1913 the Union Steamship Company's Cheslakee capsized at the dock at Van Anda, British Columbia on Texada Island, drowning at least seven people. The hulk was raised and brought to North Vancouver, BC, where it was cut in half and a new section inserted, thus extending the vessel's length by slightly less than 20 feet. The ship was renamed Cheakamus and returned to service in June 1913.

Cheakamus had a gross tonnage of 689 and net tonnage of 403. The ship was 145.3 feet long, with a beam of 28.1 feet and depth of hold of 17.1 feet. The power plant consisted of a MacColl and Company triple-expansion steam engine. The ship had a speed maximum speed of 12 knots but generally cruised at 10.5 knots. Unlike the Cheslakee, the Cheakamus was stable in heavy seas.

The ship was licensed to carry 148 passengers. The ship had a cargo capacity of about 120 tons. The official Canadian registry number was 130309.

== Operations ==
Originally Cheakamus was used on freight and passenger routes with the Cassiar until 1925 when the newly built Cardena and Catala took over these duties. After that Cheakamus was primarily used to provide service to coastal logging camps. In August 1917, Cheakamus was assigned to the route from Vancouver to Alert Bay when the normal vessel on the route, Cassiar struck a rock at Kingcome Inlet and sank.

In the late 1930s, the company modernized the passenger accommodations on Cheakamus with the objective of using the vessel on more routes.

== Transfer to U.S. Army ==
When the United States entered the Second World War in December 1941, there arose a big demand for barge service to Alaska. In 1942, Cheakamus was converted to a towboat. The ship was then purchased by the U.S. Army and used in war transport until the end of the war. The ship was then sold as war surplus to Arthur Foss of the Foss Tug concern.

== End of service ==
In 1949, Foss donated the Cheakamus to the Puget Sound Maritime Historical Society for use as a floating headquarters and museum. However the society decided that the maintenance costs for the vessel would be too great and turned it over for scrapping.
