= Cowichan (steamship) =

Steamship in British Columbia

Coordinates: 49.399°N 123.712°W

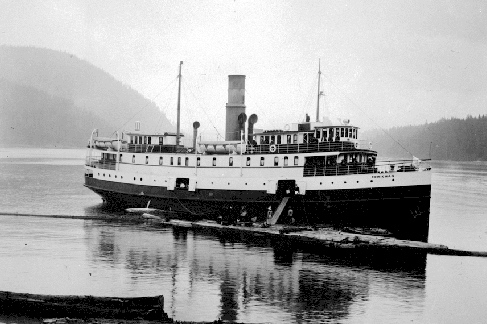
- Cowichan circa 1918, at a logging float landing.

History
- Name: Cowichan
- Owner: Union Steamship Co.
- Route: coastal British Columbia
- Launched: 23 December 1907
- Completed: 1908
- Out of service: 27 December 1925
- Identification: Canada registry #126210
- Fate: Sank after collision

General characteristics
- Class & type: Coastal steamship
- Tonnage: 962 gross 520 registered tons
- Length: 157 ft (48 m)
- Beam: 32 ft (9.8 m)
- Depth: 14 ft (4.3 m) depth of hold
- Installed power: steam engine
- Speed: 11 knots (20 km/h)
- Capacity: 225 passengers, 125 tons cargo.
- Crew: 34

Cowichan was a steamship which was operated in British Columbia under the ownership of the Union Steamship Company. Cowichan sank in 1925 following a collision with another ship.

== Nomenclature ==
Cowichan was originally launched under the name Cariboo. "Cowichan" comes from the Halkomelem word Q(a)w-(a)can, which means "warm mountains". This is believed to refer to hills at the head of the Cowichan River. The tribe of the First Nations called "Cowichan" lived on southeast Vancouver Island.

The popular name for the ship was The Cow.

== Design and construction ==
Cowichan was designed specifically to serve the remote logging camps of coastal British Columbia. A larger vessel could not maneuver in the narrow inlets such as Minstrel Island, Wells Pass, and Kingcome Inlet. Two new design aspects of the ship were a larger wheelhouse and relocating the bridge further forward so that both the quartermaster and the navigator could see over the bow.

Cowichan was built in Troon, Scotland, in 1908 by the Ailsa Shipbuilding Company. The Ailsa firm was chosen over Bow, McLachlen & Co. because Union Steamship Co. was then in litigation with Bow, McLachlen over repairs to another one of the company's ships. Dimensions of the ship were 157 feet (48 m) in length, beam 32 feet (9.8 m) and depth of hold 14 feet (4.3 m), 962 gross and 520 registered tons. Cargo capacity was 125 tons. Cowichin's ship's twin triple-expansion steam engines, built by MacColl & Co. and twin propellers drove the ship's speed was 11 knots (20 km/h). There were two boilers, manufactured by D. Rowan & Co., which were originally coal-fired.

First class accommodations consisted of 53 stateroom berths. There were 34 crewmembers. In 1914, the ship was licensed to carry 225 passengers. The ship's Canadian registry number was 126210.

The ship had separate cabins for members of the First Nations and for Japanese and Chinese persons. Loggers were also accommodated separately.

== Delivery ==
Cowichan, proceeding under the name Cariboo, was delivered to British Columbia by way of Cape Horn, there being no Panama Canal at the time. The ship was commanded by Capt. Charles Polkinghorne on the 90-day voyage, and the vessel was found to be seaworthy during the moderate storms encountered on the trip. Cariboo arrived at the Union dock in Vancouver on July 21, 1908. It was then discovered that there was already a Canadian vessel named Cariboo on the Great Lakes and so the name was changed to Cowichan.

== Operations ==
Following a trial trip to Van Anda, on Texada Island, Cowichan replaced the Cassiar on the Kingcome Inlet route, and then, on August 20, 1908, temporarily took the place of the Camosun on the company's most important route, to Prince Rupert. Cowichan eventually was assigned to its own route. Every Monday and Thursday, the ship departed Vancouver bound for Campbell River and the Rock Bay region. On the Monday trip the ship went further north, to Loughborough Inlet. The ship was also placed on a Saturday Vancouver Island run for a while, making calls at Nanaimo, Denman Island, Union Bay, and Comox before returning to Vancouver at midnight on Sunday.

The first captain of Cowichan was Charles Moody. All the Union steamers at that time, including Cowichan had only three deck officers, the captain and two mates.

In 1908, coaling was usually done at the company wharf in Vancouver unless a stop was scheduled for Nanaimo, where there were substantial mines and coaling facilities.

In 1912 Cowichan was converted to oil fuel.

== Loss ==
On December 27, 1925, Cowichan sank following a collision with Lady Cynthia, which was also owned by Union Steamship Co.

The accident occurred when the Lady Cecilia had brought a Christmas excursion of mostly lumber mill workers south from Powell River to Vancouver. Other passengers had come from the north over the holiday, and the numbers returning to Powell River exceeded Cecilia's capacity. Harold Brown, the company's general manager, had ordered that Lady Cynthia be held on standby with steam up in such an event, and the additional 200 passengers beyond the 400 on Cecilia were embarked on Cynthia.

Meanwhile, Cowichan was coming south under Captain Robert Wilson and encountered fog off Roberts Creek. Captain Wilson was proceeding slowly, listening carefully for the sound of Cecilia's whistle. Cecilia passed safely by, but then Wilson was taken by surprise 15 minutes later when Cynthia, under Captain John Boden appeared out of the fog, striking Cowichan bow-on amidships. Captain Boden shouted down from Cynthia's bridge that he would hold the bow into Cowichan to hinder the ship from sinking. There were only 45 people on board Cowichan, including 31 crew. Captain Wilson helped all board onto Cecilia's foredeck.

Captain Wilson was the last to leave Cowichan. When he stepped onto Cecilia, he called out to Captain Boden:"Pull her out now, Cap, or she'll take us down with her." When Cecila backed away, Cowichan sank almost immediately. It was reported that once Cowichan had sunk, Captain Wilson turned to Captain Boden and said: "Well, that's it. Let's go below and have coffee."

== Discovery of wreck ==
In May 1997, after a year of searching, a team of wreck hunters on the Royal Canadian Mounted Police patrol vessel Lindsay in connection with a training exercise, located what they claimed was the wreck of the Cowichan 2 miles (3.2 km) south of the White Islets off Roberts Creek, British Columbia. The water over the wreck site was 128 meters deep. Subsequent research has shown, however, that the discovered wreck was not, in fact, the Cowichan despite all the breathless newspaper reports to the contrary. Her final resting place is still not known with certainty.
