= German submarine U-877 =

German World War II submarine

History

Nazi Germany
- Name: U-877
- Ordered: 2 April 1942
- Builder: AG Weser, Bremen
- Yard number: 1085
- Laid down: 22 May 1943
- Launched: 10 December 1943
- Commissioned: 24 March 1944
- Fate: Sunk on 27 December 1944

General characteristics
- Class & type: Type IXC/40 submarine
- Displacement: 1,144 t (1,126 long tons) surfaced; 1,257 t (1,237 long tons) submerged
- Length: 76.76 m (251 ft 10 in) o/a; 58.75 m (192 ft 9 in) pressure hull
- Beam: 6.86 m (22 ft 6 in) o/a; 4.44 m (14 ft 7 in) pressure hull
- Height: 9.60 m (31 ft 6 in)
- Draught: 4.67 m (15 ft 4 in)
- Installed power: 4,400 PS (3,200 kW; 4,300 bhp) (diesels); 1,000 PS (740 kW; 990 shp) (electric)
- Propulsion: 2 shafts; 2 × diesel engines; 2 × electric motors
- Speed: 18.3 knots (33.9 km/h; 21.1 mph) surfaced; 7.3 knots (13.5 km/h; 8.4 mph) submerged
- Range: 13,850 nmi (25,650 km; 15,940 mi) at 10 knots (19 km/h; 12 mph) surfaced; 63 nmi (117 km; 72 mi) at 4 knots (7.4 km/h; 4.6 mph) submerged
- Test depth: 230 m (750 ft)
- Complement: 4 officers, 44 enlisted
- Armament: 6 × torpedo tubes (4 bow, 2 stern); 22 × 53.3 cm (21 in) torpedoes; 1 × 3.7 cm (1.5 in) Flak M42 AA gun; 2 x twin 2 cm (0.79 in) C/30 AA guns

Service record
- Part of: 4th U-boat Flotilla; 24 March – 30 November 1944; 33rd U-boat Flotilla; 1 – 27 December 1944
- Identification codes: M 50 294
- Commanders: Kptlt. Eberhard Findeisen; 24 March – 27 December 1944
- Operations: 1 patrol: 25 November – 27 December 1944
- Victories: None

German submarine U-877 was a Type IXC/40 U-boat of Nazi Germany's Kriegsmarine during the Second World War. The ship was ordered on 2 April 1942, laid down on 22 May 1943, and launched on 10 December 1943. She was commissioned into the Kriegsmarine under the command of Kapitänleutnant Eberhard Findeisen on 24 March 1944. Initially assigned to the 4th U-boat Flotilla, she was transferred to the 33rd U-boat Flotilla on 1 December 1944.

== Design ==
German Type IXC/40 submarines were slightly larger than the original Type IXCs. U-877 had a displacement of 1,144 tonnes (1,126 long tons) when at the surface and 1,257 tonnes (1,237 long tons) while submerged. The U-boat had a total length of 76.76 m (251 ft 10 in), a pressure hull length of 58.75 m (192 ft 9 in), a beam of 6.86 m (22 ft 6 in), a height of 9.60 m (31 ft 6 in), and a draught of 4.67 m (15 ft 4 in). The submarine was powered by two MAN M 9 V 40/46 supercharged four-stroke, nine-cylinder diesel engines producing a total of 4,400 metric horsepower (3,240 kW; 4,340 shp) for use while surfaced, two Siemens-Schuckert 2 GU 345/34 double-acting electric motors producing a total of 1,000 shaft horsepower (1,010 PS; 750 kW) for use while submerged. She had two shafts and two 1.92 m (6 ft) propellers. The boat was capable of operating at depths of up to 230 metres (750 ft).

The submarine had a maximum surface speed of 18.3 knots (33.9 km/h; 21.1 mph) and a maximum submerged speed of 7.3 knots (13.5 km/h; 8.4 mph). When submerged, the boat could operate for 63 nautical miles (117 km; 72 mi) at 4 knots (7.4 km/h; 4.6 mph); when surfaced, she could travel 13,850 nautical miles (25,650 km; 15,940 mi) at 10 knots (19 km/h; 12 mph). U-877 was fitted with six 53.3 cm (21 in) torpedo tubes (four fitted at the bow and two at the stern), 22 torpedoes, and a 3.7 cm (1.5 in) Flak M42 as well as two twin 2 cm (0.79 in) C/30 anti-aircraft guns. The boat had a complement of forty-eight.

== Service history ==
She carried out a single war patrol, departing Horten Naval Base on 25 November 1944. Two days later she was attacked by Bristol Beaufighters of No. 489 Squadron, which launched two depth charges at her. She crash dived, escaping the attackers, but losing her radar antenna.

U-877 was attacked on 27 December 1944 in the North Atlantic, north-west of the Azores, by the Royal Canadian Navy's Castle-class corvette HMCS St. Thomas. She was badly damaged by St. Thomas's squid mortar and sank at position 46°25′N 36°38′W, after her crew had abandoned ship. All 56 were picked up by St. Thomas.

The end of the submarine and the friendship that develops between both captains is described in the book "Ne Tirez Pas" (Don't shoot) written by Jean-Louis Morgan and Linda Sinclair published by Edition l'Archipel ISBN 9782809800135.

== Bibliography ==
- Busch, Rainer; Röll, Hans-Joachim (1999). German U-boat commanders of World War II : a biographical dictionary. Translated by Brooks, Geoffrey. London, Annapolis, Md: Greenhill Books, Naval Institute Press. ISBN 1-55750-186-6.
- Busch, Rainer; Röll, Hans-Joachim (1999). Der U-Boot-Krieg, 1939-1945: Deutsche U-Boot-Verluste von September 1939 bis Mai 1945 [German U-boat losses from September 1939 to May 1945] (in German). Vol. IV. Hamburg, Berlin, Bonn: Mittler. ISBN 3-8132-0514-2.
- Gröner, Eric; Jung, Dieter; Maass, Martin (1991). German Warships 1815-1945: U-boats and Mine Warfare Vessels. Vol. 2. Translated by Thomas, Keith; Magowan, Rachel. London: Conway Maritime Press. ISBN 0-85177-593-4.
