= HMCS St. Thomas =

1943 Castle-class corvette

History

United Kingdom
- Name: Sandgate Castle
- Namesake: Sandgate Castle, Kent
- Ordered: 19 January 1943
- Builder: Smiths Dock Company, Southbank-on-Tees
- Laid down: 23 June 1943
- Launched: 28 December 1943
- Fate: Transferred to the Royal Canadian Navy

Canada
- Name: St. Thomas
- Namesake: St. Thomas, Ontario
- Commissioned: 4 May 1944
- Decommissioned: 22 November 1945
- Identification: pennant number: K 488
- Honours and awards: Atlantic 1944–45
- Fate: Sold into mercantile service in 1946
- Name: Camosun III (1946); Chilcotin (1958); Yukon Star (1958)
- In service: 1946
- Out of service: 1970
- Fate: Broken up 1974 at Tacoma, Washington

General characteristics (as built)
- Type: Castle-class corvette
- Displacement: 1,060 long tons (1,077 t)
- Length: 252 ft (77 m)
- Beam: 36 ft 8 in (11.18 m)
- Draught: 13 ft 6 in (4.11 m)
- Installed power: 2 × water-tube boilers; 2,750 ihp (2,050 kW)
- Propulsion: 1 × 4-cylinder triple-expansion steam engine; Single screw
- Speed: 16.5 knots (30.6 km/h; 19.0 mph)
- Range: 6,200 nmi (11,500 km) at 15 kn (28 km/h; 17 mph)
- Complement: 120
- Sensors & processing systems: Type 272 radar; Type 145 sonar; Type 147B sonar
- Armament: 1 × QF 4-inch Mk XIX gun; 1 × Squid anti-submarine mortar; 1 × Depth charge rail, 15 depth charges; 4–10 × 20 mm anti-aircraft cannon

HMCS St. Thomas was a Castle-class corvette of the Royal Canadian Navy. She served during the Second World War in the Battle of the Atlantic, taking part in the sinking of the German U-boat U-877 in 1944. Initially ordered by the British Royal Navy as Sandgate Castle, the ship was transferred to Canada before completion. Following the war, the corvette was converted for mercantile use and renamed Camosun III, then Chilcotin and Yukon Star in 1958 before being broken up in Washington in 1974.

== Design and description ==
The Castle class were an improved corvette design over their predecessor Flower class. The Flower class was not considered acceptable for mid-Atlantic sailing and was only used on Atlantic convoy duty out of need. Though the Admiralty would have preferred Loch-class frigates, the inability of many small shipyards to construct the larger ships required them to come up with a smaller vessel. The increased length of the Castle class over their predecessors and their improved hull form gave the Castles better speed and performance on patrol in the North Atlantic and an acceptable replacement for the Flowers. This, coupled with improved anti-submarine armament in the form of the Squid mortar led to a much more capable anti-submarine warfare (ASW) vessel. However, the design did have criticisms, mainly in the way it handled at low speeds and that the class's maximum speed was already slower than the speeds of the new U-boats they would be facing.

A Castle-class corvette was 252 feet (77 m) long with a beam of 36 feet 8 inches (11.18 m) and a draught of 13 feet 6 inches (4.11 m) at deep load. (Note: Brown states the beam at 36.5 feet (11.1 m) and the draught at 13.5 feet (4.1 m)) The ships displaced 1,060 tonnes (1,040 long tons) standard and 1,580 tonnes (1,560 long tons) deep load. (Note: Chesneau states the displacement at deep load as 1,590–1,630 t (1,560–1,600 long tons)) The ships had a complement of 120. (Note: Brown states the complement as 99 and Johnston states the complement of Canadian ships at 112 (7 officers and 105 ratings).)

The ships were powered by two Admiralty three-drum boilers which created 2,750 indicated horsepower (2,050 kW). This powered one vertical triple expansion engine that drove one shaft, giving the ships a maximum speed of 16.5 knots (30.6 km/h; 19.0 mph). The ships carried 480 tons of oil giving them a range of 6,200 nautical miles (11,500 km; 7,100 mi) at 15 knots (28 km/h; 17 mph).

The corvettes were armed with one QF 4-inch Mk XIX gun mounted forward. (Note: Mk XIX = Mark 19. Britain used Roman numerals to denote Marks (models) of ordnance until after World War II. This was the nineteenth model of British QF 4-inch gun) Anti-air armament varied from 4 to 10 Oerlikon 20 mm cannons. For ASW purposes, the ships were equipped with one three-barreled Squid anti-submarine mortar with 81 projectiles. The ships also had two depth charge throwers and one depth charge rail on the stern that came with 15 depth charges.

The ships were equipped with Type 145 and Type 147B ASDIC. The Type 147B was tied to the Squid anti-submarine mortar and would automatically set the depth on the fuses of the projectiles until the moment of firing. A single Squid-launched attack had a success rate of 25%. The class was also provided with HF/DF and Type 277 radar.

== Construction and career ==
The British Admiralty ordered as Sandgate Castle, after the castle in Kent, on 19 January 1943 and allocated her the pennant number K373. She was built at Smiths Dock Company and launched on 28 December 1943, but was never commissioned into the Royal Navy. Instead, she was transferred to the Royal Canadian Navy.

St. Thomas was named for the city of St. Thomas, Ontario in Canada and was commissioned on 4 May 1944 with the pennant number K488. Her first captain was Lieutenant Commander Leslie Perman Denny, RCNR. Of the ship's complement, at least five were from St. Thomas, and about a dozen from Elgin County.

Her primary mission was to escort convoys across the North Atlantic to Britain. After working up at Tobermory she joined the Mid-Ocean Escort Force escort group C-3 as a trans-Atlantic convoy escort. St. Thomas escorted 13 convoys across the North Atlantic in 1944–1945.

=== Sinking of U-877 ===
St. Thomas is credited with the sinking of U-877, a German submarine on 27 December 1944. The battle took place north-west of the Azores in position 46º25'N, 36º38'W, 1,000 kilometres (620 mi) off the coast of Newfoundland. St. Thomas twice detected and carried out attacks on the U-boat using her Squid forward-throwing anti-submarine mortar. St. Thomas had begun to withdraw, when the damaged U-boat was discovered to have surfaced 4 kilometres (2.5 mi) away. Rather than attacking a third time, the Canadian First Lieutenant (second-in-command), Stanislas Déry, ordered the crew, "Ne tirez pas" (Don't shoot). Instead, St. Thomas and HMCS Sea Cliff rescued all 56 members of the German crew. Shortly afterwards U-877 sank. The German second-in-command was credited with calling Déry every year to thank him for saving his life. The sinking of U-877 was another of the many submarines successfully hunted and sunk by the RCN during the Battle of the Atlantic, confirming the Canadians as leading U-boat hunters. .

Her second, and last captain was Lieutenant Commander Berkeley Hynes, RCNVR, who commanded St. Thomas from 27 January 1945 until shortly before her decommissioning late that same year. She returned to Canada in April 1945 and underwent a refit at Halifax, Nova Scotia beginning on 30 April. After the refit was completed she sailed to Esquimalt, British Columbia in July and remained there until being paid off on 22 November 1945.

=== Postwar service ===
Following the war St. Thomas was sold into mercantile service and converted to a coastal passenger/cargo ship with a gross register tonnage of 1,835 tons. Initially renamed Camosun III in 1946 and owned by Union Steamships Ltd., the ship was renamed Chilcotin in 1958 before being sold to Alaska Cruise Lines Ltd and renamed again to Yukon Star in 1958. In 1970, Yukon Star was sold to West Line Ltd and hulked for use as a floating hotel in Tacoma, Washington. The ship was sold to J. Gadison Machinery Ltd. in 1974 before being sold again that year to General Metals of Tacoma Inc. and broken up at Tacoma. The original ship's bell from St. Thomas was donated to the city of St. Thomas in the late 1940s.
