= Cheslakee =

Steamship that operated from 1910 to 1913

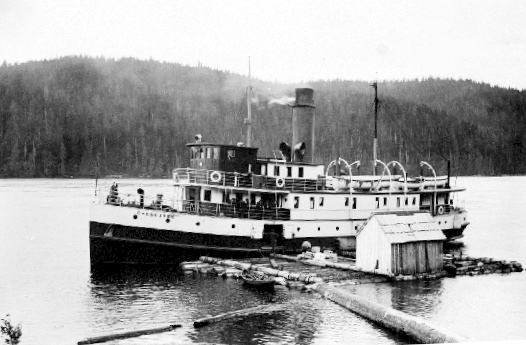
- Cheslakee at Powell River, British Columbia, 1912

History
- Name: Cheslakee
- Route: coastal British Columbia
- In service: 1910
- Fate: Scrapped 1946

General characteristics
- Type: Coastal steamship
- Tonnage: as built : 526 Gross register tons.
- Length: 132 ft (40.2 m)
- Beam: 28 ft (8.5 m)
- Depth: 18 ft (5.5 m) depth of hold
- Installed power: steam engine
- Speed: 11 to 12 knots maximum

Cheslakee was a steamship that operated from 1910 to 1913 under the ownership of the Union Steamship Company of British Columbia. In 1913, the ship sank, killing seven people. This was the only accident involving a passenger fatality in the 70-year history (1889–1959) of the Union Steamship Company. Following the sinking Cheslakee was raised, reconstructed, and launched again under a different name.

== Nomenclature ==
"Cheslakee" was the name of a settlement of the 'Namgis group of Kwakwaka'wakw at the mouth of the Nimpkish River also known as Whulk. The name Cheslakees is said to have been that of the chief of the village at the time of Vancouver's visit in 1792. This town had been visited by Captain George Vancouver and the name was recorded in his journal.

== Design and construction ==
Cheslakee was built in Ireland in 1910. The ship was designed by A.T.C. Robertson, a Vancouver naval architect who had previously been employed with Bow, McLachlan & Co. The hull, the maindeck and the crew's quarters were completed in Dublin by Dublin Dockyard Co. The ship was then towed to Belfast, where a triple-expansion, compound steam engine was installed, generating 650 horsepower. The engine was manufactured by MacColl & Co., and drove the vessel at a maximum speed of 11 to 12 knots. No cabins or upperworks were installed in Belfast.

The dimensions of the vessel were 132 feet long, 28-foot beam, 18-foot depth of hold, and 526 Gross register tons. The engine was built by MacColl & Co., of Belfast, Ireland.

Cheslakee would be the smallest modern vessel owned by the company. Chesalakee although small, was like the company's other steamers, built on a steel hull, and was considered, at least in 1910, to have been of the highest standard of construction.

== Delivery and completion ==
Cheslakee departed Belfast on June 29, 1910, under the command of Capt. J.W. Starkey, who was a specialist in delivering new ships to their owners. With the Panama Canal not yet complete, the voyage required travel around Cape Horn. The ship first went to the island of St. Vincent, took on coal and water, then proceeded south to Montevideo. Chesalakee then rounded South America, calling at Coronel, Chile and then at San Francisco, California. The ship left San Francisco on September 20 and arrived in Vancouver, British Columbia on September 26, 1910. With no upperworks, the ship looked like a tugboat on arrival.

The Union company sent Cheslakee to Wallace Shipyard in North Vancouver to have upper works constructed and generally prepare the vessel for operations. Twenty-three first class cabins containing 56 berths were constructed, as well as a small lounge. Afterwards the ship was licensed to carry 148 passengers in British Columbia coastal service. Thirty persons could be seated in the dining salon, and the ship could carry 120 tons of cargo. This was deemed sufficient for the route it was intended for, which was serving logging camps on the coast of British Columbia north as far as Kingcome Inlet. While Cheslakee had handled well during the ocean journey, after the upperworks were added the ship took on a permanent list. En route through Surge Narrows the ship heeled over so far the crew thought it might capsize.

== Capsize ==
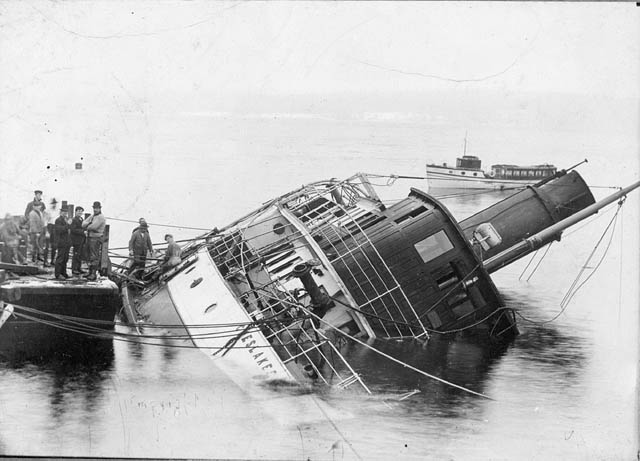
Cheslakee capsized at Van Anda, undergoing salvage operations.

On Monday, January 6, 1913, Cheslakee departed Union dock in Vancouver at 8:45 pm bound for Van Anda, on Texada Island. The ship, under the command of Capt. John Cockle, (d. 1917) had embarked 97 passengers and loaded 45 tons of cargo. Cheslakee arrived at Van Anda at 3:25 am the next morning, January 7. Eight passengers disembarked, and some cargo was offloaded. Twenty minutes later, in stormy weather the ship departed Van Anda bound for Powell River. About ten minutes later, with the ship about 1.5 miles from Van Anda, a heavy squall struck the vessel, with a wind speed estimated at 65 miles per hour. This caused the vessel to heel over on the left side at an angle of about 25 degrees. Two heavy seas struck the vessel at about the same time, causing some cargo to break loose, which made the vessel more unstable. The pilot, First Officer Robert Wilson, turned the ship around to head back to Van Anda, with the wind striking on the left side of the vessel. This helped bring the ship somewhat more upright. When Captain Cockle reached the wheelhouse, he concurred in the decision to return to Van Anda, and he ordered Chief Steward G.J. Booth to have all passengers prepared to disembark immediately upon arrival.

When the ship reached the dock, Captain Cockle tried to bring the left hand side of the ship alongside the wharf, so that if the vessel rolled, it would strike the wharf rather than go into the water. However, the ship lost power before this could be done, and it was the right side of the ship that was laid against the pier, even though the ship was leaning over sharply to the left. A gangway was run out on the right hand side onto the dock, and passengers disembarked. Eventually the lean became so sharp that the gangway could not reach the dock, and it had to be supplemented by a long plank. The ship started flooding and began to sink. According to a report, all the officers remained calm. Captain Cockle personally rescued three loggers who were trapped on board. However, not everyone was able to get off, and seven people drowned. This was the only loss of life on a passenger vessel in the 70-year history of the Union Steamship company.

== Inquiry and salvage ==
On January 20, 1913, a marine court of inquiry was conducted to determine the cause of the disaster. The court criticized the construction work on the cabins and other work that had been done to the vessel since for making the ship top heavy. The court also found that it had been the practice to leave freight doors open for ventilation, and it was possible these were open or not properly secured at the time of the accident.

Union Steamship Company contracted with the B.C. Salvage company to raise the Cheslakee. The salvage firm sent its ship Salvor to Van Anda, and in a few weeks was able to raise Cheslakee and tow the ship back to Vancouver.

== Later history ==
Once in Vancouver the ship was cut in half and an additional 20 feet of hull was inserted, thus lengthening the vessel to 145 feet and increasing the size to 689 Gross register tons, This was the first time this type of reconstruction had been done in British Columbia. The rebuilt vessel was given new name, Cheakamus. In 1941 the rebuilt ship was transferred to the U.S. Government. In 1946 the rebuilt ship was scrapped.

== See also ==
Media related to Cheslakee (ship, 1910) at Wikimedia Commons
