= Capilano (steamboat) =

Steamship built in 1920, British Columbia, Canada

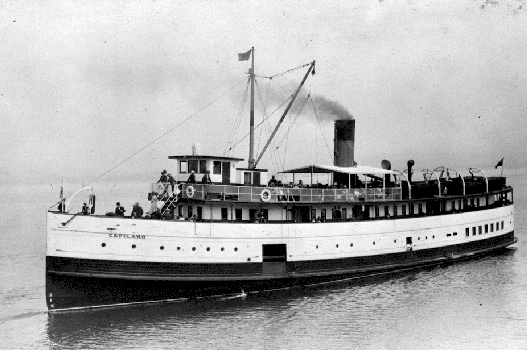
- Capilano in Vancouver Harbor, 1925, backing away from a landing.

History
- Name: Capilano
- Owner: Union Steamship Co of BC
- Route: coastal British Columbia
- Builder: BC Marine Ways
- In service: 1920
- Out of service: 1949
- Identification: Canada registry #141709
- Fate: Dismantled

General characteristics
- Type: coastal steamship
- Tonnage: 374 gross register tons
- Length: 135 ft (41 m)
- Beam: 20 ft (6 m)
- Depth: 8 ft (2 m) depth of hold
- Installed power: triple expansion steam engine, 750 hp (560 kW)
- Speed: 14.5 knots (27 km/h)

Capilano was a steamship built in 1920 in British Columbia, which served until 1949.

== Design and construction ==
Capilano was built in 1920 at the BC Marine Ways for the Union Steamship Company. The triple expansion steam engine for the Capilano came from the Puget Sound steamer Washington, and was rated at 750 horsepower (560 kW). Union Steamship had acquired the assets of the All Day Line, which included a steamboat route from Vancouver to Selma Park, British Columbia. (Selma Park is now a neighborhood of Sechelt, BC.) Capilano was built for this route.

Capilano was built of wood, and was 135 feet (41 m) long with a beam of 20 feet (6.1 m) and 8-foot (2.4 m) depth of hold. The ship had a speed of 14.5 knots (27 km/h).

== Operations ==
Capilano operated on a route running along the Sunshine Coast of mainland British Columbia.

== Disposition ==
Capilano was withdrawn from service in 1949.
