= Cutch (steamship) =

Steamship built in 1884

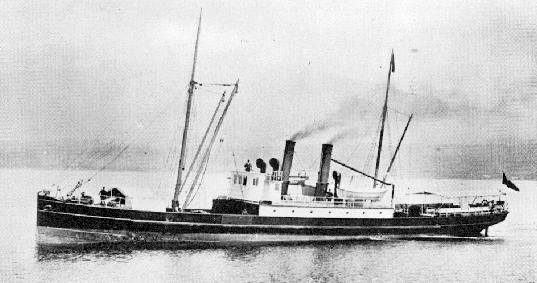
- Cutch in Canadian service before 1898.

History
- Name: Cutch
- Route: coastal British Columbia
- In service: 1884
- Identification: Canada registry #100202; US registry 77526; flag signal K.R.Q.S.
- Fate: Transferred to Colombia, renamed Bogota

General characteristics
- Type: Coastal steamship
- Tonnage: as built: 324 gross tons; rebuilt: 676 gross tons
- Length: 180 ft (54.9 m)
- Beam: 23 ft (7.0 m)
- Depth: 12 ft (3.7 m) depth of hold
- Installed power: double expansion steam engine, coal-fired boiler.
- Sail plan: auxiliary schooner
- Speed: 12 miles per hour nominal
- Capacity: 1890: 150 pass.; 1898: 210 pass.

Cutch was a steamship built in 1884 in Hull, England. The ship served as a pilgrimage vessel and a yacht in India from 1884 to 1890, then as a steamship in British Columbia from 1890 to 1900 under the ownership of the Union Steamship Company. The ship was wrecked in August 1900, then salvaged and registered in the United States as Jessie Banning. In 1902 the ship was transferred to the navy of Colombia where it was armed with cannon and served in the Colombian navy as the gunboat Bogota. Bogota shelled the city of Panama on November 3, 1903, during the secession of Panama from Colombia.

== Design and construction ==
Cutch was built in 1884 in Hull, England by the firm of James Brunner & Co. Cutch was built to the order of Jumabhoy Lolljee, of Bombay to be used to carry people on religious pilgrimages. This required a high speed. On July 1, 1884, the ship was taken on the trial run on July 1 this vessel went for her trial trip at Withernsea, at the Humber Estuary. Trial speeds of over 12 knots were obtained over a measured mile. As built, Cutch was 180 feet long, with a beam of 23 feet and 12-foot depth of hold. Overall size of the ship as built was 324 gross tons. The hull was iron.

The original power plant was a double-expansion steam engine, with high-pressure cylinder 25 inches in diameter, low-pressure of 48-inch diameter, and a stroke of 30 inches, and drove the ship, at least nominally, at 12 miles per hour. Coal consumption was 12 tons in 24 hours. Boiler pressure was 100 pounds of steam and the engine turned 92 revolutions per minute at top speed.

Cutch had an auxiliary sailing rig as a schooner.

== Transfer to Canada ==
In 1890, the Union Steamship Company bought the ship from the estate of the Maharajah of Cutch (India), who had been using it as a yacht. The ship was brought from India to British Columbia under the command of Capt. William Webster, manager of the company. Cutch arrived in British Columbia in June 1890. Cutch was originally licensed in Canada to carry 150 passengers.

== Operation ==
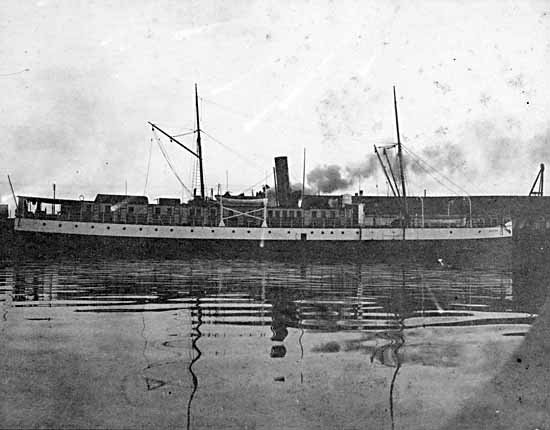
Cutch in 1898 following reconstruction

From 1892 to 1896, Cutch was used on the route from Vancouver to Nanaimo, British Columbia, stopping en route at Steveston. Cutch carried passengers for the Canadian Pacific Railway, which had rail terminals at both Vancouver and Nanaimo, but which had not then entered into the steamship business.

Cutch was rebuilt in 1898, with new machinery and cabins for 60 additional passengers. The overall size of the vessel was more than doubled, from 324 to 676 gross tons. In 1898 and 1899, Union Steamship Company placed Cutch and two other steamships on the run north on the Inside Passage to Skagway and Dyea, Alaska.

Cutch was wrecked on August 24, 1900, in Stephens Passage, Alaska. The vessel was sold for salvage and then towed to Portland, Oregon. In 1901 the ship was registered in the United States under the name Jessie Banning and given US registry number 77526. Dimensions of the vessel according to the US registry were 175.3 feet in length, beam of 23.6 feet, and 11.7-foot depth of hold. Overall size of the ship as listed on the US registry was 639 gross tons and 267 registered tons. As Jessie Banning the ship operated out of Seattle, Washington as a homeport.

== Transfer to Colombia ==
In 1902, the vessel was transferred to Colombia under the name Bogota. The ship was placed in service with the navy of Colombia and was their most powerful vessel on the Pacific Coast. The ship was armed with one 14-pounder gun, eight rapid fire 6-pounder cannon, and two Vickers-Maxim machine guns. In theory the ship was still capable of moving at 12 miles per hour, although the state the machinery generally did not allow a speed of greater than 9 miles per hour.

On November 3, 1903, in the course of the secession of Panama from Colombia (an event linked to the construction of the Panama Canal, Bogota fired several shells into the city of Panama, killing one resident of the city (Wong Kong Yee of Hong Sang, China).
