= HMS Walmer Castle =

History

United Kingdom
- Name: Walmer Castle
- Namesake: Walmer Castle
- Ordered: 19 January 1943
- Builder: Smiths Dock Company, South Bank
- Laid down: 23 September 1943
- Launched: 10 March 1944
- Identification: Pennant number: K405
- Fate: Transferred to the Royal Canadian Navy

Canada
- Name: Leaside
- Namesake: Leaside, Ontario
- Acquired: 1943
- Commissioned: 21 August 1944
- Decommissioned: 16 November 1945
- Identification: Pennant number: K492
- Honours and awards: Atlantic 1944–45
- Fate: Sold for mercantile service 1946

History
- Name: Coquitlam (1946–1957); Glacier Queen (1958–1979)
- Operator: Union Steamship Company (1946–1958); Alaska Cruise Lines Ltd. (1958–1973); M. J. Stanley (1973)
- Port of registry: (Canada) (1946–1950); (Liberia) (1950–1973); (United States) (1973–1979)
- Acquired: 1946
- In service: 1946
- Out of service: 1978
- Fate: Sank 8 November 1978; Refloated; Scuttled 19 January 1979

General characteristics (as built)
- Type: Castle-class corvette
- Displacement: 1,060 long tons (1,077 t)
- Length: 252 ft (77 m)
- Beam: 36 ft 8 in (11.18 m)
- Draught: 13 ft 6 in (4.11 m)
- Installed power: 2 × water-tube boilers; 2,750 ihp (2,050 kW)
- Propulsion: 1 × 4-cylinder triple-expansion steam engine; Single screw
- Speed: 16.5 knots (30.6 km/h; 19.0 mph)
- Range: 6,200 nmi (11,500 km) at 15 kn (28 km/h; 17 mph)
- Complement: 120
- Sensors & processing systems: Type 272 radar; Type 145 sonar; Type 147B sonar
- Armament: 1 × QF 4-inch Mk XIX gun; 1 × Squid anti-submarine mortar; 1 × Depth charge rail, 15 depth charges; 4–10 × 20 mm anti-aircraft cannon

HMS Walmer Castle was a Castle-class corvette constructed for the British Royal Navy during the Second World War. Before completion, the ship was transferred to the Royal Canadian Navy and renamed HMCS Leaside. The corvette was used as an ocean convoy escort during the war and was sold for mercantile use following it. The ship was purchased for use as a passenger ship and renamed Coquitlam, then in 1958, Glacier Queen. In 1970 Glacier Queen was acquired for use as a floating hotel in Alaska. The ship sank in 1978 and was raised and scuttled in Alaskan waters in 1979.

== Design and description ==
The Castle class were an improved corvette design over their predecessor Flower class. The Flower class was not considered acceptable for mid-Atlantic sailing and was only used on Atlantic convoy duty out of need. Though the Admiralty would have preferred Loch-class frigates, the inability of many small shipyards to construct the larger ships required them to come up with a smaller vessel. The increased length of the Castle class over their predecessors and their improved hull form gave the Castles better speed and performance on patrol in the North Atlantic and an acceptable replacement for the Flowers. This, coupled with improved anti-submarine armament in the form of the Squid mortar led to a much more capable anti-submarine warfare (ASW) vessel. However, the design did have criticisms, mainly in the way it handled at low speeds and that the class's maximum speed was already slower than the speeds of the new U-boats they would be facing.

A Castle-class corvette was 252 feet (77 m) long with a beam of 36 feet 8 inches (11.18 m) and a draught of 13 feet 6 inches (4.11 m) at deep load. (Note: Brown states the beam at 36.5 feet (11.1 m) and the draught at 13.5 feet (4.1 m)) The ships displaced 1,060 long tons (1,080 t) standard and 1,580 long tons (1,610 t) deep load. (Note: Chesneau states the displacement at deep load as 1,590–1,630 long tons (1,620–1,660 t)) The ships had a complement of 120. (Note: Brown states the complement as 99 and Johnston states the complement of Canadian ships at 112 (7 officers and 105 ratings).)

The ships were powered by two Admiralty three-drum boilers which created 2,750 indicated horsepower (2,050 kW). This powered one vertical triple expansion engine that drove one shaft, giving the ships a maximum speed of 16.5 knots (30.6 km/h; 19.0 mph). The ships carried 480 tons of oil giving them a range of 6,200 nautical miles (11,500 km; 7,100 mi) at 15 knots (28 km/h; 17 mph).

The corvettes were armed with one QF 4-inch Mk XIX gun mounted forward. (Note: Mk XIX = Mark 19. Britain used Roman numerals to denote Marks (models) of ordnance until after World War II. This was the nineteenth model of British QF 4-inch gun) Anti-air armament varied from 4 to 10 Oerlikon 20 mm cannons. For ASW purposes, the ships were equipped with one three-barreled Squid anti-submarine mortar with 81 projectiles. The ships also had two depth charge throwers and one depth charge rail on the stern that came with 15 depth charges.

The ships were equipped with Type 145 and Type 147B ASDIC. The Type 147B was tied to the Squid anti-submarine mortar and would automatically set the depth on the fuses of the projectiles until the moment of firing. A single Squid-launched attack had a success rate of 25%. The class was also provided with HF/DF and Type 277 radar.

== Construction and career ==
Walmer Castle, named for the castle in Kent, was ordered on 19 January 1943. The ship was laid down by Smiths Dock Company at South Bank-on-Tees on 23 September 1943. At some point in 1943, the ship was transferred to the Royal Canadian Navy and launched on 10 March 1944. The ship was commissioned into the Royal Canadian Navy as Leaside, named for a small town in Ontario on 21 August 1944, with the pennant number K492.

The corvette worked up at Tobermory in September before joining the Mid-Ocean Escort Force in October as part of escort group C-8. Leaside was deployed as an escort for trans-Atlantic convoys for the rest of the war. In May 1945, she returned to Canada, and departed for the West coast in June. Leaside was paid off on 16 November 1945 at Esquimalt, British Columbia.

The ship was sold for mercantile use to the Union Steamship Company and was converted to cargo/passenger ship with a gross register tonnage of 1,833 tons. The ship entered service as a coastal passenger ship Coquitlam in 1946, sailing along the British Columbia coast. In 1950, the ship was renamed Glacier Queen and registered under a Liberian flag. (Note: Miramar claims that ownership was transferred in 1958 to Alaska Cruise Lines Ltd. and her port of registry remained at Vancouver.)

In 1973, Glacier Queen was purchased by M.J. Stanley and prepared for use a floating hotel. The ship arrived at Valdez, Alaska, in 1974, for use by the tourist industry after the town's growing population took over all the pre-existing hotels during the construction of the Trans-Alaska Pipeline System. On 8 November 1978, the ship sank at anchor in Seldovia Bay (59.4274°N 151.7249°W) in Cook Inlet on the south-central coast of Alaska. The ship was later refloated, towed out to sea by the salvage tug Salvage Chief, and scuttled in the Gulf of Alaska 100 nautical miles (190 km; 120 mi) west of Cape Saint Elias on 19 January 1979.

== Commemoration ==
The ship's bell is located at Leaside High School in Toronto.
