= Chasina =

Steam-powered ship

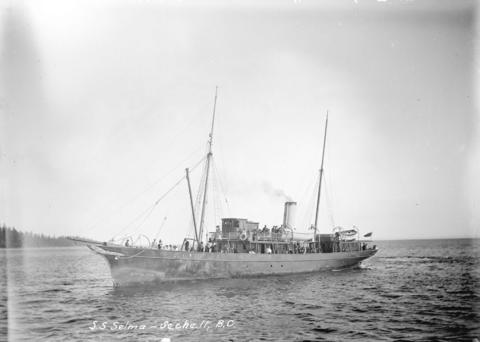
- Chasina as Selma, circa 1913.

History
- Name: Chasina (1917-1923); Selma (1910-1917); Santa Cecilia (1881-1910)
- Owner: Union Steamship Company of British Columbia (1917-1923); All Red Line (1910-1927); others
- Route: coastal British Columbia
- Builder: John Elder & Co., Govan, Scotland
- Yard number: 259
- Identification: Canada registry #85075
- Fate: Disappeared at sea 1931

General characteristics
- Type: Steel-hulled steam yacht and coastal steamship
- Tonnage: 258 gross tons; 139 registered tons.
- Length: 141.8 ft (43.2 m)
- Beam: 22.1 ft (6.7 m)
- Depth: 11.6 ft (3.5 m) depth of hold
- Installed power: Steam engine
- Propulsion: Propeller
- Speed: 13.5 knots max.; 11.5 knots avg.
- Capacity: Licensed for 200 passengers in summer; 153 winter; 40 tons cargo.

Chasina was an iron-hulled, steam-powered ship, originally built as a steam yacht, but later converted to a passenger-freighter vessel that served in coastal British Columbia and other areas during the early decades of the 1900s under the ownership several different companies. The ship disappeared in 1931 after leaving Hong Kong.

== Nomenclature ==
Chasina was named after Chasina Island, which is in the Okisollo Channel west of Maurelle Island on the coast of British Columbia. The actual meaning of "chasina", a word from the First Nations is unknown.

== Design and construction ==
Chasina was built in 1881 by John Elder & Co. The steel -hulled clipper-bowed ship originally was launched on November 3, 1881 as the steam yacht Santa Cecilia for a wealthy member of Parliament from a prominent family, Alfred Paget. (1816–1888). The vessel was built at Govan, Scotland, at the Fairfield yard of John Elder & Co.

The ship was 141.8 feet long, with a beam of 22.1 feet and depth of hold of 11.6 feet. As a yacht, the ship's tonnage was calculated at 300 tons, using a special yacht tonnage measurement. As a commercial ship, the vessel was rated at 258 gross tons and 159 registered tons. For operations on coastal British Columbia, Chasina was licensed to carry 200 passengers in summer and 153 in the winter.

The vessel had a maximum speed of 13.5 knots, but generally proceeded as an average speed of 11.5 knots.

As built, the yacht was equipped with compound steam engines. The high-pressure cylinder had a bore diameter of 18 inches, with the low-pressure cylinder having a 36-inch bore. The stroke length on both cylinders was 21 inches. A single boiler was installed by the builders, which supplied steam to the engines at 100 pounds pressure.

== Yacht career ==
During the ship's career as the yacht Santa Cecilia, a number of notable guests were hosted on board, including King Edward VII and Lillie Langtry.

== Transfer to Vancouver ==
In 1910 the ship was brought to the coast of British Columbia under Capt. Charles Polkinghome from the South Pacific. The ship was then purchased by the All Red shipping line, and renamed Selma. The official Canadian registry number was 85075.

Polkinghome continued in command of the vessel under the All Red line, which used the ship to serve a route out of Vancouver to Powell River in conjunction with another former steam yacht, the Santa Maria, renamed Chilco in Union service. One ship would start at Vancouver at 9:30 am and the other would start at Powell River, usually passing at Sechelt, where both ships called. Along the way, they stopped at a number of small landings, such as Roberts Creek, Pender Harbour, Stillwater, and Myrtle Point.

== Union Steamship career ==
In 1917, the All Red line and all of its ships and assets were purchased by the Union Steamship Company of British Columbia. Selma was then renamed Chasina.

== Later service ==
In 1923, Union Steamship decided to sell Chasina to make room for newer vessels which were then being brought into service. Chasina was then reputed to have been used as a rum runner. On September 6, 1931, the ship departed Hong Kong and was never seen again.
