= Lady Cynthia =

Steel-hulled passenger ship converted from a minesweeper

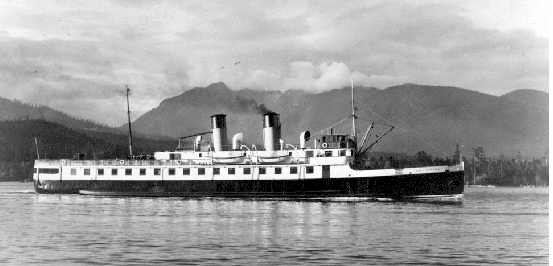
- Lady Cynthia circa 1938.

History
- Name: Lady Cynthia
- Owner: Union Steamship Company of British Columbia
- Route: coastal British Columbia
- Builder: Original: (1919) Ardrossan Dry Dock & Shipbuilding Co., Ardrossan; rebuilt 1924-1925 by Coaster Construction Co. in Montrose, Scotland
- Launched: 20 March 1919
- In service: 1925
- Out of service: 1957
- Identification: Canada registry #152899
- Fate: Scrapped 1957
- Notes: Originally constructed as HMS Barnstaple, a minesweeper for the Royal Navy.

General characteristics
- Type: steel-hulled coastal steamship
- Tonnage: 950 gross tons; 390 registered tons.
- Length: 219.3 ft (66.8 m)
- Beam: 28.6 ft (8.7 m)
- Depth: 16.3 ft (5.0 m) depth of hold
- Installed power: twin triple-expansion steam engines, two Yarrow water tube boilers.
- Propulsion: twin propellers
- Speed: 15.5 knots maximum; 13.5 knots average.
- Capacity: Licensed for 800 day passengers, 900 during excursions, 500 during winter; 75 tons cargo capacity.

Lady Cynthia was a steel-hulled passenger ship converted from a minesweeper, (formerly HMS Barnstaple), which served in the coastal waters of British Columbia from 1925 to 1957. Lady Cynthia was a sistership to Lady Cecilia, also a converted minesweeper. The ship was generally referred to as the Cynthia while in service.

== Nomenclature ==
The Union Steamship Company of British Columbia, owners of Lady Cynthia, had a number of vessels which operated in all areas of the coast of British Columbia. The company, however, ran a number of routes close to Vancouver where overnight accommodations on board ship would be unnecessary, with the objective being to carry large numbers of day passengers. To distinguish vessels intended for this service from the company's other ships, these day vessels were given names that began with "Lady", and included Lady Cynthia, Lady Cecilia, Lady Alexandra, Lady Pam, Lady Evelyn, and Lady Rose.

== Design and construction ==
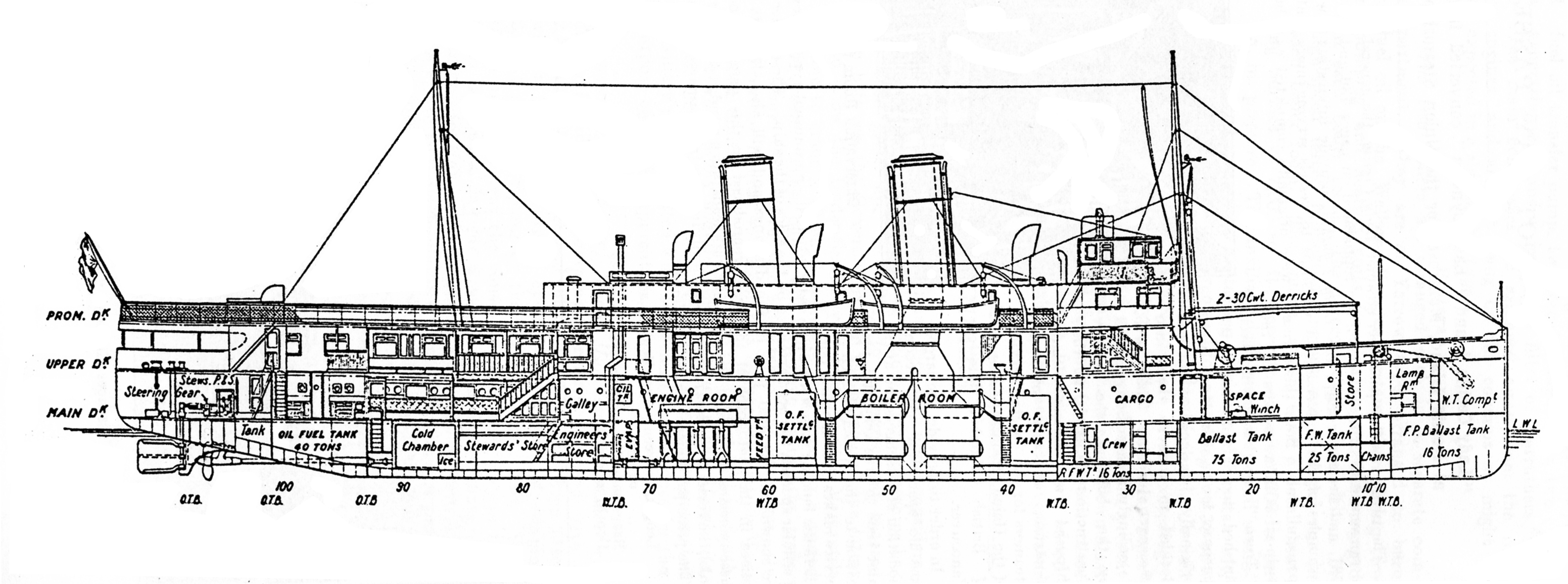
Profile plan of the Lady Cynthia steamship of the Union Steamship Company of British Columbia

Lady Cynthia was originally built in 1919 as a Town class minesweeper and served with the Royal Navy as HMS Barnstaple. The navy sold the minesweeper in 1924, and it was purchased by the Union Steamship Company of British Columbia. The vessel was reconstructed at the shipyard of Coaster Construction Co., under the management of W.D. McLaren, in Montrose, Scotland.

An upper deck was added, and to maintain the ship's stability, sponsons were added on each side of the hull. The sponsons reduced the maximum speed of the ship from 19 to 15 knots. The rebuilt ship had two funnels but the rear funnel was a dummy, added for appearance, but did provide engine room ventilation.

Accommodation included a forward observation lounge, a main saloon framed in mahogany with maple panels, a dining saloon framed and paneled in mahogany, a café with oak dance floor, and considerable promenade deck seating. Although a day-steamer, three staterooms were available on the promenade deck.

Lady Cynthia had a gross tonnage of 950 and net tonnage of 390. The ship was 230 feet in length overall, and 220 feet in length between perpendiculars, with a beam of 34.5 feet including the sponsons. The depth of the cargo hold was 16.3 feet.

The power plant consisted of twin Ross and Duncan triple-expansion steam engines, two propellers, and two Yarrow water tube boilers. The maximum speed was about 15.5 knots but this required firing of both boilers and was reserved for special occasions. Normal speed was 13 knots, and one boiler was sufficient for this.

The ship was licensed for a maximum of 900 passengers on summer excursions, 800 passengers in other summer travel, and 500 passengers during the winter. Cargo capacity was approximately 75 tons. The official Canadian registry number was 152899.

== Entry into passenger operations ==
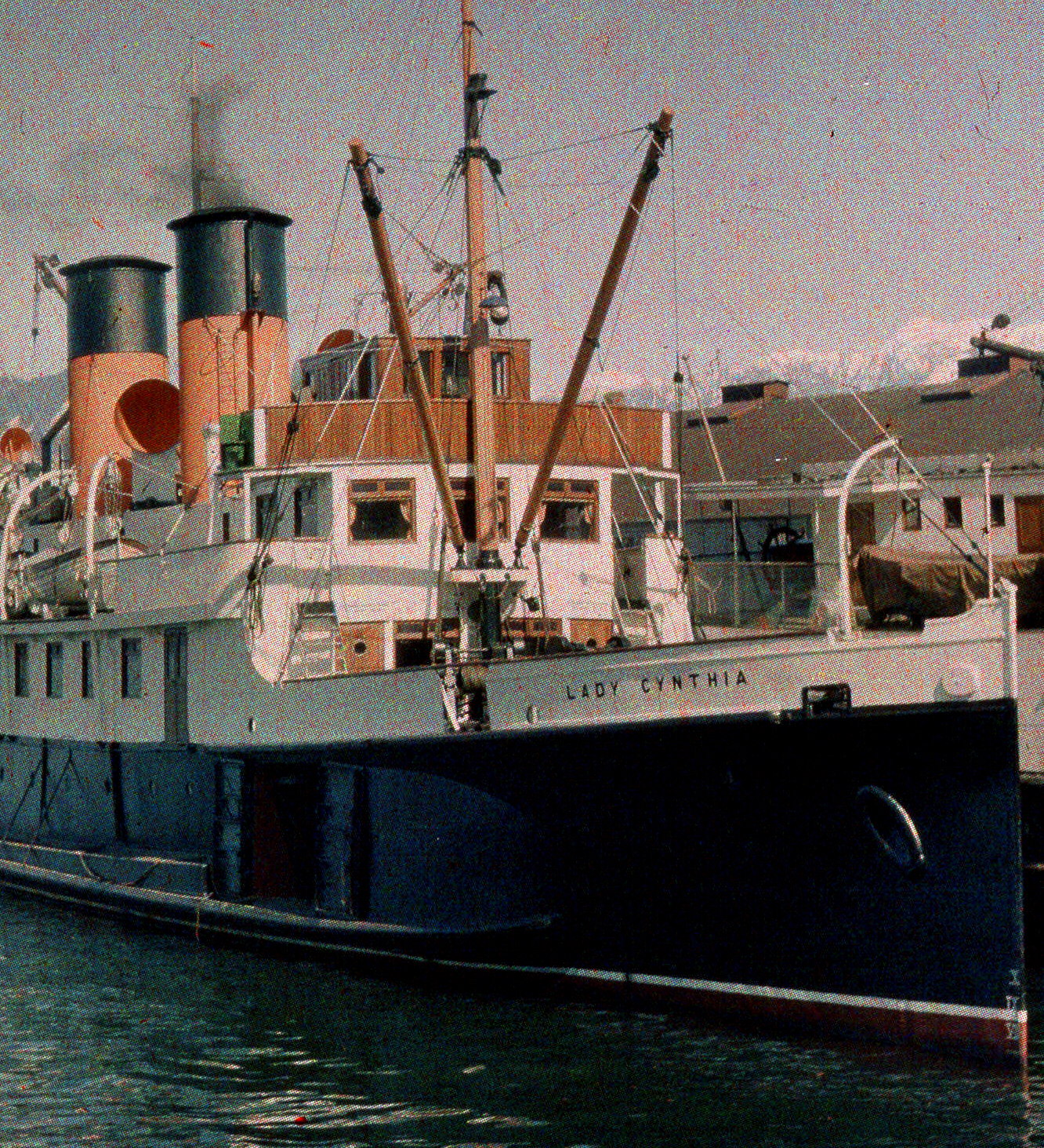

Following reconstruction, Lady Cynthia reached Vancouver BC on August 22, 1925. The company placed the ship on the route from Vancouver to Powell River under Capt. Alfred E. Dickson, the company's most senior master for the first trip. Afterwards, Capt. John Boden was placed in command. Starting in the 1920s, Lady Cynthia was employed on excursions to Bowen Island, where the Union Steamship company owned and operated a popular resort. Other Howe Sound ports of call included Porteau, Anvil Island, Britannia, Woodfibre, Squamish, Keats Island, Grantham's Landing, and Gibson's Landing. “Sunshine Coast” ports of call included Gower Point, Wilson Creek, Robert's Creek, Selma Park, Halfmoon Bay, Buccaneer Bay, Pender Harbour, Savary Island, Powell River, and Cortez Island, and Stuart Island.

== Collision with Cowichan ==
On December 27, 1925, Lady Cynthia collided with another Union company steamship, the Cowichan, which resulted in the sinking of the Cowichan. The collision occurred when a third Union ship, the Lady Cecilia had brought a Christmas excursion of mostly lumber mill workers from Powell River to Vancouver. Other passengers had come from the north over the holiday, and the numbers returning to Vancouver exceeded Cecilia's capacity. Harold Brown, the company's general manager, had ordered that Lady Cynthia be held on standby with steam up in such an event, and the additional 200 passengers beyond the 400 on Cecilia were embarked on Cynthia.

Meanwhile, Cowichan was coming south under Captain Robert Wilson and encountered fog off Roberts Creek. Captain Wilson was proceeding slowly, listening carefully for the sound of Cecilia's whistle. Cecilia passed safely by, but then Wilson was taken by surprise 15 minutes later when Cynthia, under Captain John Boden appeared out of the fog, striking Cowichan bow-on amidships. Captain Boden shouted down from Cynthia's bridge that he would hold the bow into Cowichan to keep Cowichan from sinking. There were only 45 people on board Cowichan, including 31 crew. Captain Wilson of the Cowichan helped all of them board onto Cynthia's foredeck.

Captain Wilson was the last to leave Cowichan. When he stepped onto Cynthia, he called out to Captain Boden: "Pull her out now, Cap, or she'll take us down with her." When Cynthia backed away, Cowichan sank almost immediately.

== Later service ==
On November 4, 1930, the Lady Cynthia ran aground in thick fog near Mission Point. Passengers were removed by tug and the Cynthia was later refloated. During the depression era, some ports of call were deleted from the schedule. For example, west Howe Sound was served by a connecting small motorboat (M.V. ‘’Comox’’) to which passengers transferred from the steamer at Bowen Island.

On January 22, 1936, Lady Cynthia collided with a Pacific Great Eastern Railway Barge, resulting in holing of the number 1 sponson tank on the starboard side, which was quickly repaired in drydock, allowing the Cynthia to resume service.

In January 1937, a log jammed the port propeller in east Howe Sound and the ship returned to port using the starboard engine.

In late May 1939, King George VI and Queen Elizabeth visited Vancouver. They departed on May 29, 1939 on board the Canadian Pacific steamer Princess Marguerite. Lady Cynthia and five other Union steamships embarked 2,500 passengers between them to accompany the Princess Marguerite, with the royal party on board, as far as Point Atkinson.

== War time operations ==
War was declared in September, 1939. All the ships of the Union company operated under limited running lights at night, and all portholes were blacked out. Radio silence was maintained, and later anti-mine equipment and anti-aircraft guns would be added to the ships. During the war, the Union company's ships, including Lady Cynthia, engaged in "Win the War Cruises" carrying purchasers of wa bonds, with the crew donating their time. Gasoline shortages also encouraged people who would otherwise have used their automobiles to take short boat trips on Lady Cynthia to Howe Sound for recreation.

On September 20, 1939, the Lady Cynthia collided in fog with a 6-foot fish packer, Princeton No. 1. The crew transferred to the Lady Cynthia, and the packer was later beached. In September, 1941, the ship struck a rock near Camp Island, damaging the starboard propeller beyond repair.

In 1943, the aft funnel was removed and the bridge and observation lounge were expanded. Venting from the aft funnel was redirected through the forward funnel.

A costly grounding occurred at Stillwater on December 14, 1944, resulting in damage to the propellers, shafting, and steering engine. Replacement propellers cost $1045 each and the company received a scrap value of $150 for the old propellers. Total cost of the repair was $12,702.30.

In the summer of 1948, the dining saloon was modernized, and the main lounge was enlarged.

== Post-war service ==
In September 1948, another Union steamship, the cruise vessel Chilcotin, while returning to Vancouver, near Texada Island became disabled by machinery failure. Lady Cynthia was dispatched, picked up the 102 passengers, members of an American Shrine group, and transported them to Vancouver, where they could make their connections with trains and airplanes for return to their homes.

In November 1949, the Capilano River bridge washed out, blocking road traffic between Vancouver and West Vancouver. A repair washed out on December 1, and the ‘’Lady Cynthia’’ was dispatched to carry 400 people, stranded in Vancouver, to Dundarave Pier in West Vancouver. The ‘’Cynthia’’ proved too large to approach the Dundarave Pier, so passengers were shuttled via the smaller motor vessels ‘’Lady Rose’’ and ‘’Bonabelle’’. Some six ships conveyed several thousand people on this route prior to bridge restoration.

In August 1950, Lady Cynthia collided with the Canadian Forestry Service motor launch A.L. Bryant off Bowen Island. The forestry launch was cut in two. Of the seven men on board the launch, three were lost and four were rescued.

The Union Steamship company began encountering serious competition from the automobile and from auto-carrying ferries in the late 1940s and early 1950s,. After 1951, although the company kept ships on some of the more distant routes, only the Lady Cynthia remained in year-round service in the Gulf of Georgia, running from Vancouver to Squamish, BC, in Howe Sound, where there was a connection to the Pacific Great Eastern Railway.

Another grounding occurred in July 1952, at Pender Harbour, when an engineer put an engine the wrong way.

On October 28, 1953, Lady Cynthia rammed and sank the tug Dola. Although the tug sank in five minutes, the nine-man crew of the Dola was taken on board the Cynthia and no one was lost. At the time, Dola had been towing a railway barge with rail cars for the Squamish rail connection.

On July 3, 1955, the Union Steamship Company was hit with a labor strike, which tied up its vessels for most of the summer season, which the company depended upon for much of its revenue. In September 1955, once the strike was settled, the company did not return Lady Cynthia to the Squamish route.

== Withdrawal from service ==
In 1956, the Pacific Great Eastern Railway completed a rail link from Squamish to North Vancouver, and there was no further need for the marine connection with the railway which had once been served by Lady Cynthia.

Lady Cynthia was withdrawn from service and partially dismantled in Vancouver. The hull was sold to Glazer and Sternoff Metals, a Seattle scrap metal concern. On October 3, 1957, the hull was towed out of Vancouver harbor bound for Seattle to be scrapped.
