= Lady Alexandra =

Steamship built in 1924

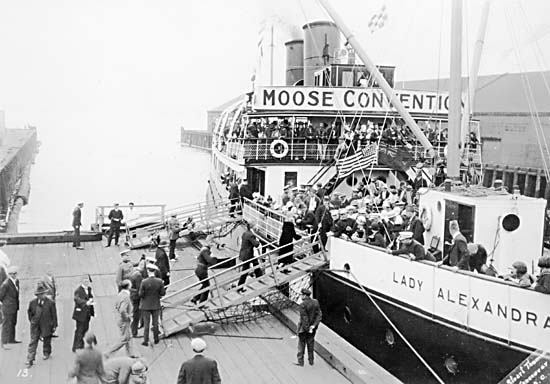
- Lady Alexandra embarking Loyal Order of Moose convention, June 3–5, 1926.

History
- Name: Lady Alexandra
- Route: coastal British Columbia
- In service: 1924
- Out of service: 1954
- Identification: Canada registry #151207
- Fate: Wrecked 1980

General characteristics
- Type: Coastal steamship
- Tonnage: as built : 1,396 gross tons.
- Length: 225 ft (68.6 m)
- Beam: 40 ft (12.2 m)
- Depth: 18 ft (5.5 m) depth of hold
- Decks: three
- Installed power: steam engine
- Speed: 14 knots
- Capacity: Licensed for 1,400 passengers, often carried close to 2,000.

Lady Alexandra was a steamship built in 1924 in Montrose, Scotland which served in British Columbia from 1924 to 1952, mostly on Howe Sound.

== Design and construction ==
Lady Alexandra was designed for the routes from Vancouver, British Columbia to Bowen Island and Howe Sound. Alexandra had a gross tonnage of 1,396 and net tonnage of 678. The ship was 225.4 feet long, with a beam of 40.7 feet and depth of hold of 9.7 feet.

The power plant consisted of twin triple-expansion steam engines, developing 270 net and 2,200 indicated horsepower driving twin propellers. The ship had a speed of 14 knots.

The ship was primarily a day steamer, having only 10 berths in six staterooms. The ship was licensed to carry 1,400 persons on daylight trips in Howe Sound and 900 persons across the Strait of Georgia to Victoria, British Columbia. In operation the ship often carried close to 2,000 passengers. The ship had three decks, a dining room that could seat 86 people as well as a large hardwood dance floor. The ship had a cargo capacity of 300 tons, but in operation the vessel rarely carried more than 100 tons. The official Canadian registry number was 151207.

Alexandra was built by Coaster Construction Co., of Montrose, Scotland. Construction began in October 1923, and the ship was launched on February 21, 1924. After undergoing trials on the North Sea, the ship left Scotland on May 7 and arrived in Vancouver on June 21, 1924.

== Operation ==
Alexandra's primary use was a day vessel carrying organized excursions on Howe Sound, including in particular to the resort area owned by the Union Steamship Company on Bowen Island. Alexandra's first trip was on June 25, 1924, four days after arriving in Vancouver, was an excursion to view the battlecruiser HMS Hood, then on a visit to Vancouver.

Although Alexandra had been designed primarily as a summer-time day excursion steamer, the company had intended to use the ship, which had a 300-ton cargo capacity, as a freighter in the off-season to transport canning supplies to, and pick up packed salmon from, the many canneries along the coast of British Columbia north of Vancouver Island. This was done just once, following the close of the 1924 summer season. Alexandra was sent north to the Skeena River with a load of cans. On the way south, laden with salmon, in open waters of Queen Charlotte Sound, the ship rolled continuously and dangerously as much as 35 degrees. While it would probably have been possible to mitigate the rolling by adjustments to the ship's trim, the company had other vessels which could serve the route, and thereafter the Alexandra was kept on the southern routes.

The ship was popularly known as the Alex. Passenger travel to the Bowen Island resort tripled after the Alexandra was brought into service. In the 1920s and 1930s it was a common practice in Vancouver for companies and associations to organize large annual excursions to Bowen Island for their employees or members. The largest of these was the Longshoreman's Union annual picnic, when 3,000 people would be embarked for Bowen Island on the Alexandra and two other steamers. The Port of Vancouver willingly shut operations every year on the day of the picnic. Popular Vancouver orchestras were recruited to play on the company's "Moonlight Dance Cruises" which left every Wednesday and Saturday evening. Alexandra was also occasionally used on employed on excursions running from White Rock to Victoria, British Columbia. Excursion work was seasonal in nature but highly profitable for the company.

Alexandra's crew began work at 7:00 am to get the ship ready, and often worked until 1:00 am, making a 16- or 17-hour day. In addition to the ordinary work of the ship, the tasks of embarking, disembarking, and keeping order among up to 2,000 passengers on a daily usually fell to the deckhands. For this work deckhands were paid $69 per month in the 1930s.

For much of the 1920s and 1930s, the master of the Alexandra was William "Cappy" Yates (1890–1966), who although not known as an outstanding seaman, was knowledgeable about the methods of showmanship that made him and the company popular, such as delaying a departure at Bowen Island to retrieve a child's hat which had blown overboard.

== Withdrawal from service ==
Business fell off for the Union Steamship Company in the early 1950s. In 1952, Alexandra's season and routes were curtailed, and following the 1953 season, the ship was withdrawn from service altogether. In 1960 the ship was converted into a floating restaurant. The ship was moored at Coal Harbour in Vancouver. Later the vessel was towed to California and moored at King Harbor in Redondo Beach. There it served as a floating restaurant, Princess Louise II (named for the Princess Louise moored a few miles away), until it was wrecked in a storm in March 1980.
