= SS Cardena =

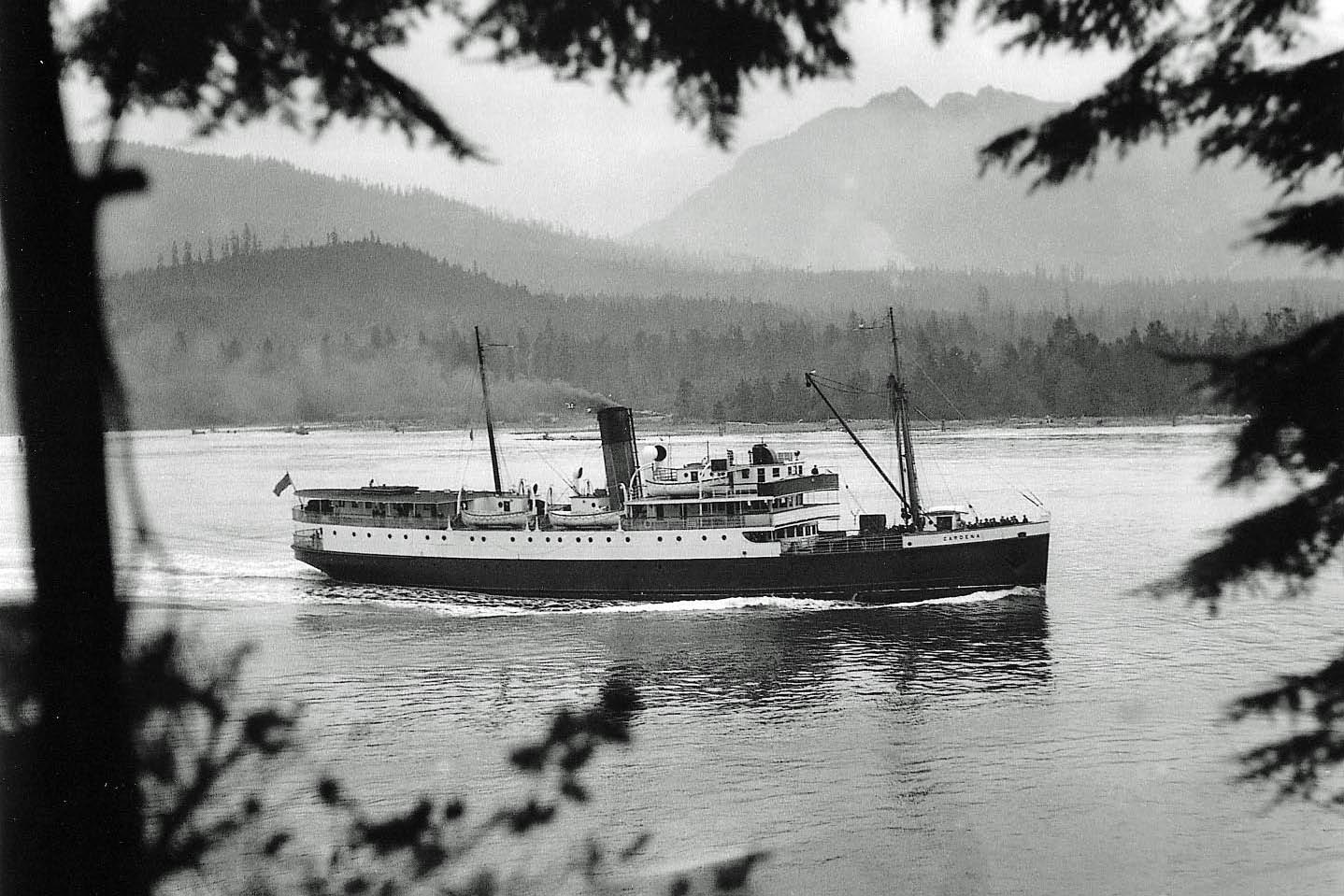
- Off Prospect Point, c. 1925

History
- Name: SS Cardena
- Owner: Union Steamship Company of British Columbia
- Port of registry: Vancouver, British Columbia, Canada
- Route: Coastal British Columbia
- Ordered: October 1922
- Builder: Napier & Miller, Old Kilpatrick
- Launched: March 22, 1923
- Completed: May 3, 1923
- Acquired: June 11, 1923
- Maiden voyage: June 20, 1923
- In service: 1923–1958
- Out of service: 1958–1961
- Identification: Official number:150977
- Fate: Sold for scrap February, 1961

General characteristics
- Type: Passenger/freight steamship
- Tonnage: 1,559 GRT
- Length: 226 ft (69 m)
- Beam: 37 ft (11 m)
- Draught: 18 ft (5.5 m)
- Installed power: 2,000 ihp (1,500 kW)
- Propulsion: Twin direct-acting, triple-expansion steam engines
- Speed: 14 knots (26 km/h; 16 mph)
- Capacity: 250 passengers; 350 tons cargo

For more than 35 years, from 1923 to 1958, the Union steamship Cardena sailed the British Columbia Coast, carrying passengers, groceries, dry goods, industrial cargo, mail and sundry other supplies to the 200 or so mining, logging and fishing communities that once dotted the province's coastline during the early years of the 20th century. On her return voyage, at the peak of the summer fishing season, Cardena routinely carried thousands of cases of canned salmon to the railheads at Prince Rupert and Vancouver for shipment across Canada and around the world. And so it went for the better part of half a century; a regular and reliable marine service (with only infrequent interruptions) that made Cardena a coastal institution, remembered with affection and regard by the countless men, women and children who inhabited those tiny outports in a bygone era.

== History ==
Cardena was modeled on SS Venture, an older Union ship that had proven her worth over many seasons on the same northern run. To the Venture's design was added 50 ft (15 m) in length, 5 ft (1.5 m) in beam, a refrigeration compartment, 42 inside cabins, four outside cabins on the boat deck, plus a dining saloon that seated 68. The ship took its name from Cardena Bay on the south shore of Kennedy Island, at the mouth of the Skeena River, which in turn was named after García López de Cárdenas, an early Spanish explorer of the New World.

Following her launch on March 22, 1923, and after completed sea trials, Cardena departed for Vancouver on May 3 under the command of Captain Alfred E. Dickson. The ship arrived in Vancouver on June 11, and headed out on her maiden voyage north a mere nine days later. The Company’s anxious directors were soon relieved to hear from captain and crew alike that their newest addition to the Union fleet, the first of its kind in 12 years, was a complete success in every way. The ship's ease of handling in rough seas was particularly suited to the often perilous crossings of Queen Charlotte Sound, while the maneuverability afforded by her twin screws made Cardena ideal for the delicate piloting required to navigate the treacherous shoals and shifting sandbars guarding the approaches to the Skeena River canneries.

== Description ==
SS Cardena was an all-steel, twin-screw, double bottom passenger and cargo steamship, fitted with direct-acting, triple-expansion engines with an indicated rating of 2,000 indicated horsepower (1,500 kW). The ship's length was 226 ft (69 m) with a 37-foot (11 m) beam. She drew 18 ft (5.5 m) of water and had a gross tonnage of 1,559 tons. Cardena cruised at 13 knots (24 km/h), just below her maximum speed. She was licensed to carry 250 passengers in 132 cabin berths and on 60 deck settees. Cargo capacity was 350 tons. When fully loaded, the ship was capable of transporting 11,000 cases of canned salmon, in addition to 30 tons of boxed fish in refrigerated storage.

The net effect of these combined attributes was one of the most graceful liners ever to sail the BC coast, and a fine sea-boat as well. With her black hull, white superstructure and twin, out-rigged freight booms, Cardena provided reliable, weekly service to the north coast salmon canneries along the Nass and Skeena Rivers. To the grateful inhabitants of these far-flung settlements, the familiar blasts from the ship's red and black funnel (one long, two short, one long) inevitably heralded Cardena's approach as she steamed her way up the long green channels of the Inside Passage towards her next port-of-call. This scheduled arrival, often late at night, in thick fog or foul weather, was cause for the camp or cannery workers to assemble along the company dock to greet the ship and await the mail, or perhaps to buy chocolate or a magazine from the purser’s on-board news stand. Over the 70-year period that the Union Steamship Co. of BC operated its fleet of 53 vessels (1889–1959), it was no exaggeration to claim that the Union service was the life-line of the coast.

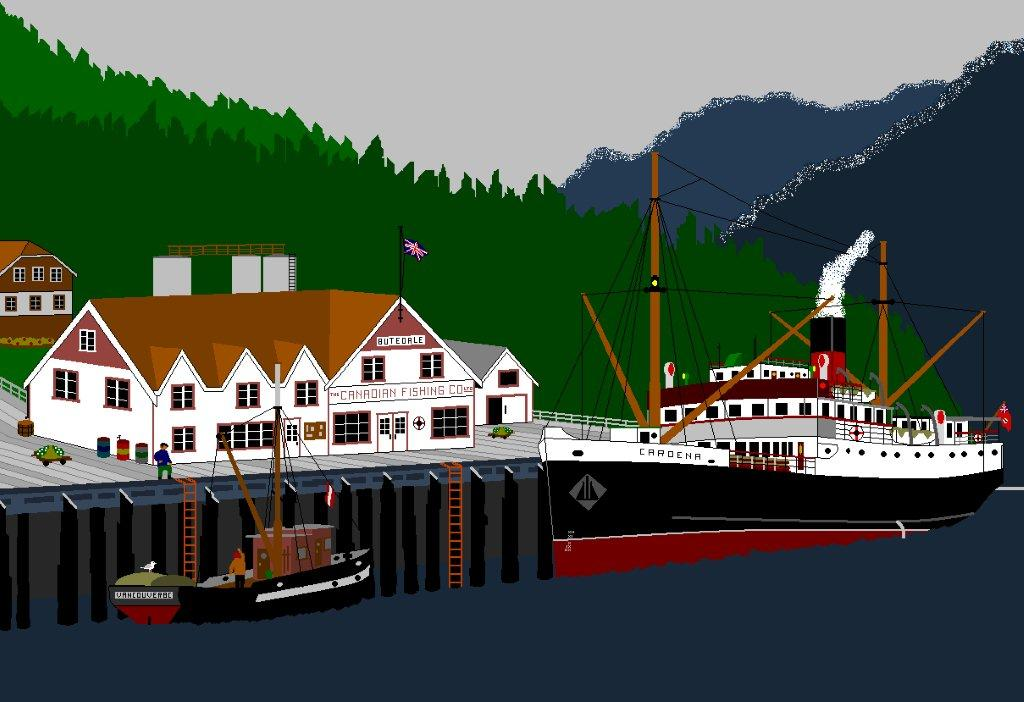
Butedale Cannery, 1947

== Ripple Rock ==
As if in anticipation of the indignities of her later groundings and collisions, Cardena's well-earned moment of glory came in the summer of 1927, when she freed the CNR liner SS Prince Rupert from the clutches of Ripple Rock in Seymour Narrows, a treacherous, three-mile tidal surge lying in Discovery Passage between Vancouver Island and Quadra Island. Ripple Rock, an undersea double pinnacle that sank more than 100 vessels (and cost as many lives) over the years, was obliterated by a man-made explosion on April 5, 1958.

But when, in the early morning mist of that August day in 1927, Cardena came upon Prince Rupert stuck fast, Ripple Rock was a scant two fathoms below the surface. Cardena's skipper, Andy Johnstone, immediately ordered his ship in close to the stricken vessel, where it became apparent that Prince Rupert was in imminent danger of foundering, or of being forced by the tide against the steep cliffs that overhung the Narrows. Captain Johnstone next ordered that a steel tow line be cast to Prince Rupert's stern. With this in place, Cardena swung alongside the other ship and made fast.

Then, slowly and with great seamanship and care, the smaller Union vessel nudged Prince Rupert off Ripple Rock and began to tow her towards Deep Cove, a mile distant. There, Cardena took on board as many of Prince Rupert's passengers as she could carry before continuing on her way to Vancouver. The remainder were later transferred to the CPR vessel SS Princess Beatrice, which was also in the vicinity at the time. The Union Company eschewed any and all salvage claims for the rescue, preferring to bask in the good will that this gesture garnered from its competitors and the public alike.

== Marine mishaps ==
The early history of steam navigation on the BC coast is one of impressive feats of seamanship accomplished by seasoned captains who expertly guided their small, sturdy ships through narrow, reef-strewn channels in all manner of wind, tide and weather. In the days before the advent of radar and other electronic aids to navigation, coastal captains relied upon detailed notations in the ship’s log to guide their way. These precisely recorded observations of wind, time, tide, bearing and position enabled the captain to follow the correct course on all subsequent passages, so long as the ship’s speed remained the same. To supplement this procedure in conditions of limited visibility, the ship’s whistle was utilized as a rudimentary form of sonar. By recording the time it took for the whistle blast to echo back to the ship from the surrounding terrain, an accurate estimate of the distance from shore could be arrived at.

However, notwithstanding the undisputed skill of Union skippers over long service to the Company, the maritime history of the fog-bound BC coastline is also replete with tales of frequent collisions, groundings, scrapings and founderings, and Cardena was no exception to this unfortunate record.

In Grenville Channel, 1949

The ship's first two mishaps at sea occurred in the fall and winter of 1929, when she twice ran aground near the mouth of the Skeena River. Two years later, the ship sliced a fish packer in half at Namu dock when her telegraph cable broke. Then, in early 1942, during wartime blackout conditions, Cardena was rammed by the tugboat La Pointe. Two unoccupied staterooms were destroyed in the collision but no serious injuries or loss of life occurred as a result.

Six years later, in the summer of 1948, Cardena ran aground again, this time on a reef near False Bay on Lasqueti Island. All passengers were evacuated but the crew remained on board. Salvage tugs were eventually able to free the ship from the reef and, even though her hull was holed in two places, Cardena was escorted to Vancouver under her own steam. The ship's next two mishaps actually occurred on the same day in the Fall 1950. First, when she grounded in the sand off Savary Island dock, and shortly afterwards, when she drifted onto the shore while attempting a landing at Surge Narrows in a running tide.

In March 1952, Cardena grounded on mud flats under Lions Gate Bridge and, in early 1953, struck a rock in Patrick Channel, near Sullivan Bay in the Broughton Archipelago. Then, in Fall 1953, again under Lions Gate Bridge, the Union ship collided head-on in heavy fog with the CPR liner Princess Elizabeth, leaving a 20-foot (6.1 m) gash in Cardena's bow. Following the collision, the two conjoined vessels managed to maneuver into the sheltered waters of English Bay, away from the busy shipping lanes beneath the bridge. All of the passengers had donned life jackets, but they remained aboard for the four hours it took to separate the ships by cutting torch.

Cardena's last recorded incident occurred on November 30, 1956, when she struck a rock shortly after leaving Port Hardy for the trip north to Bella Coola. The few passengers on board were evacuated to waiting boats and the ship was freed, undamaged, by tugs the next morning.

To place the foregoing record in perspective, in the latter 45 years of the Union Company's coastal service, not one passenger life was lost to a marine mishap. This admirable safety record included the years when it was not unusual for the company's fleet to travel upwards of 25,000 miles (40,000 km) in a single month.

== Endings ==
The end came for Cardena in 1958, just as the end was looming for the Union Steamship Co. itself. Although the company was ultimately a casualty of the many post-war changes in the province's transportation industry, there were several factors that may have hastened its eventual demise: The expensive conversion of three surplus navy corvettes into highly unsuitable passenger/freight vessels; the loss of SS Chelohsin after grounding off Siwash Rock in the fall of 1949; The supplanting of the company's profitable Howe Sound and Sunshine Coast day excursions by the automobile and car-ferries; The loss of north coast passenger business to improved airline schedules; The questionable business decisions that flowed from a reorganization of the company in 1954, and again in 1956; A bitter eight-week strike by the Seafarers International Union in the summer of 1955, which cost the company the loss of the season, and the settlement of which imposed radical changes to many of its former operating procedures and conditions.

Lastly, the Union Company's failure to obtain a crucial increase in the federal coastal shipping subsidy meant that its annual operating losses were now unsupportable. This dire predicament led to the company's subsequent decision to suspend all subsidized passenger service at the end of 1957, and to its eventual sale to the Northland Navigation Company 13 months later.

As a result of the suspension of passenger service, Cardena, along with SS Catala, was laid up in early 1958 and her dining saloon was converted to a cafeteria. Catala was returned to service in April, but Cardena languished alone and dormant for the next three years, before being sold for scrap to Capital Iron and Metals of Victoria, BC in February 1961. There she was stripped to her hull, which was then towed to Powell River on the Sunshine Coast to form part of a harbour breakwater. The hulk was later towed to Kelsey Bay, on the north-east coast of Vancouver Island, where it can be seen today, still providing a maritime service as one of the remains of five vessels that comprise the local breakwater.

Kelsey Bay, 2007

Coda: A recent approach to several provincial museums to reclaim, restore and exhibit Cardena's intact bow-piece met with no takers.

== See also ==
Union Steamship Company of British Columbia
