= Van Anda, British Columbia =

Van Anda
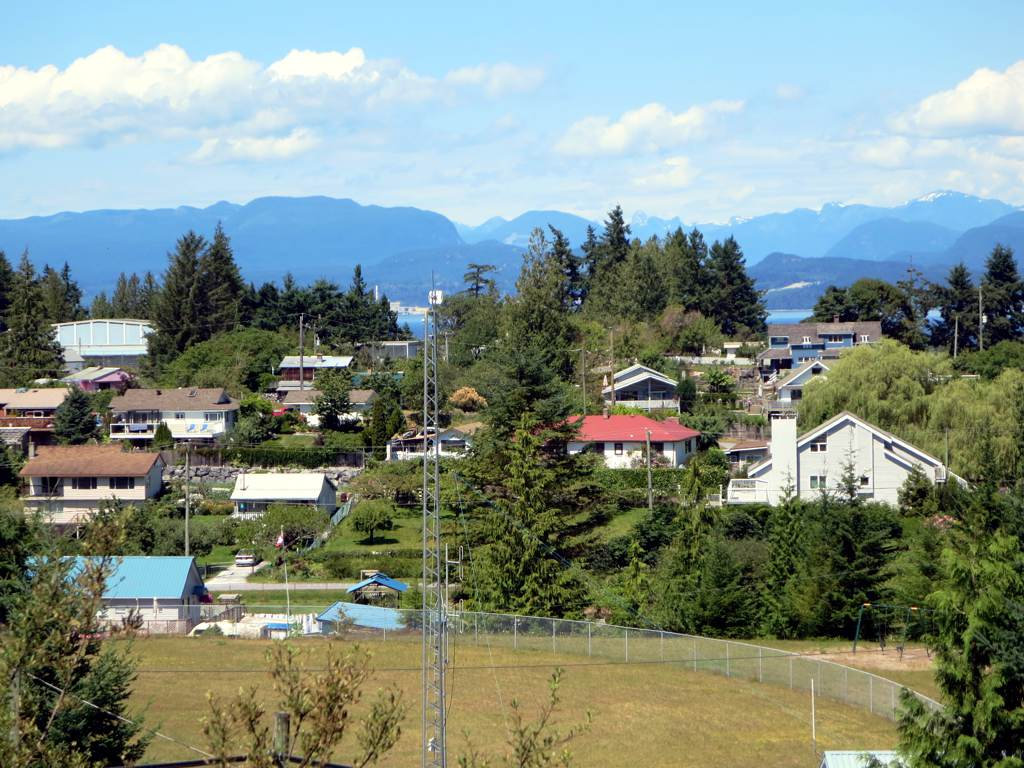

- Location of Van Anda in British Columbia
- Coordinates: 49°45′30″N 124°33′00″W
- Country: Canada
- Province: British Columbia
- Time zone: UTC−07:00 (PT)
- Area codes: 250, 778

Van Anda, formerly spelled Vananda, is an unincorporated settlement on Texada Island in the northern Gulf of Georgia in British Columbia, Canada. As of 2023, it has a population of approximately 362 people. The surrounding region incorporates Blubber Bay and Gillies Bay.

== Name origin ==
Named after the Van Anda Copper & Gold Mining Company which owned 840 acres (3.4 km^{2}) on the northeast side of the island, including the "Copper Queen" claim. President Edward Blewett, a prominent American capitalist and miner, named both his son and this mining company after his wife, Carrie Van Anda (maiden name).
