= Convoy HX 300 =

Convoy during naval battles of the Second World War

Convoy HX.300
- Part of World War II
Date	17 July – 3 August 1944
Location	North Sea
Result	Allied Victory

Belligerents
Germany	United Kingdom; Canada; United States; Norway

Commanders and leaders
Admiral Karl Dönitz	Rear-Admiral Sir A T Tillard KBE DSO

Strength
unknown	159 merchant ships 32 escorts

Casualties and losses
unknown	none

Convoy HX 300 was the 300th of the numbered series of World War II HX convoys of merchant ships from Halifax to Liverpool. It started its journey on 17 July 1944 and was the largest convoy of the war, comprising 166 ships.

== Background ==
These HX convoys had been established shortly after declaration of war; and the first sailed on 16 September 1939. Ships in convoy were less vulnerable to submarine attack than ships sailing independently, but the Allies had difficulty providing an adequate number of escorting warships to establish a protective perimeter for detecting and defeating approaching submarines. British Admiralty operations research scientists evaluating convoy battles of 1941 and 1942 determined losses of ships in convoy were independent of convoy size, but varied with the number of attacking submarines and, when patrol aircraft were unavailable, with the number of escorting warships. They suggested convoy losses could be reduced by 64 percent by decreasing the frequency of convoys to increase the average number of merchant ships in each convoy from 32 to 54 and the number of escorting warships from 6 to 9. Additional reduction of losses was theoretically possible with even larger convoys, but difficulties maneuvering large formations of ships and providing port services for simultaneous arrival of so many ships discouraged very large convoys until trade convoy escort warships were required to support the Invasion of Normandy. More than one hundred ships sailed in each of 7 ON convoys and 9 HX convoys during the summer of 1944. HX 300 was the largest of these with 166 merchant ships arranged in 19 parallel columns to produce a formation approximately 9 miles (14 km) wide and 4 miles (6.4 km) long. Ships sailing from New York City on 17 July 1944 were joined by 30 merchant ships sailing from Halifax Harbour on 19 July, 24 sailing from Sydney, Nova Scotia on 20 July, and 3 from St. John's, Newfoundland and Labrador to form the largest trade convoy of the war.

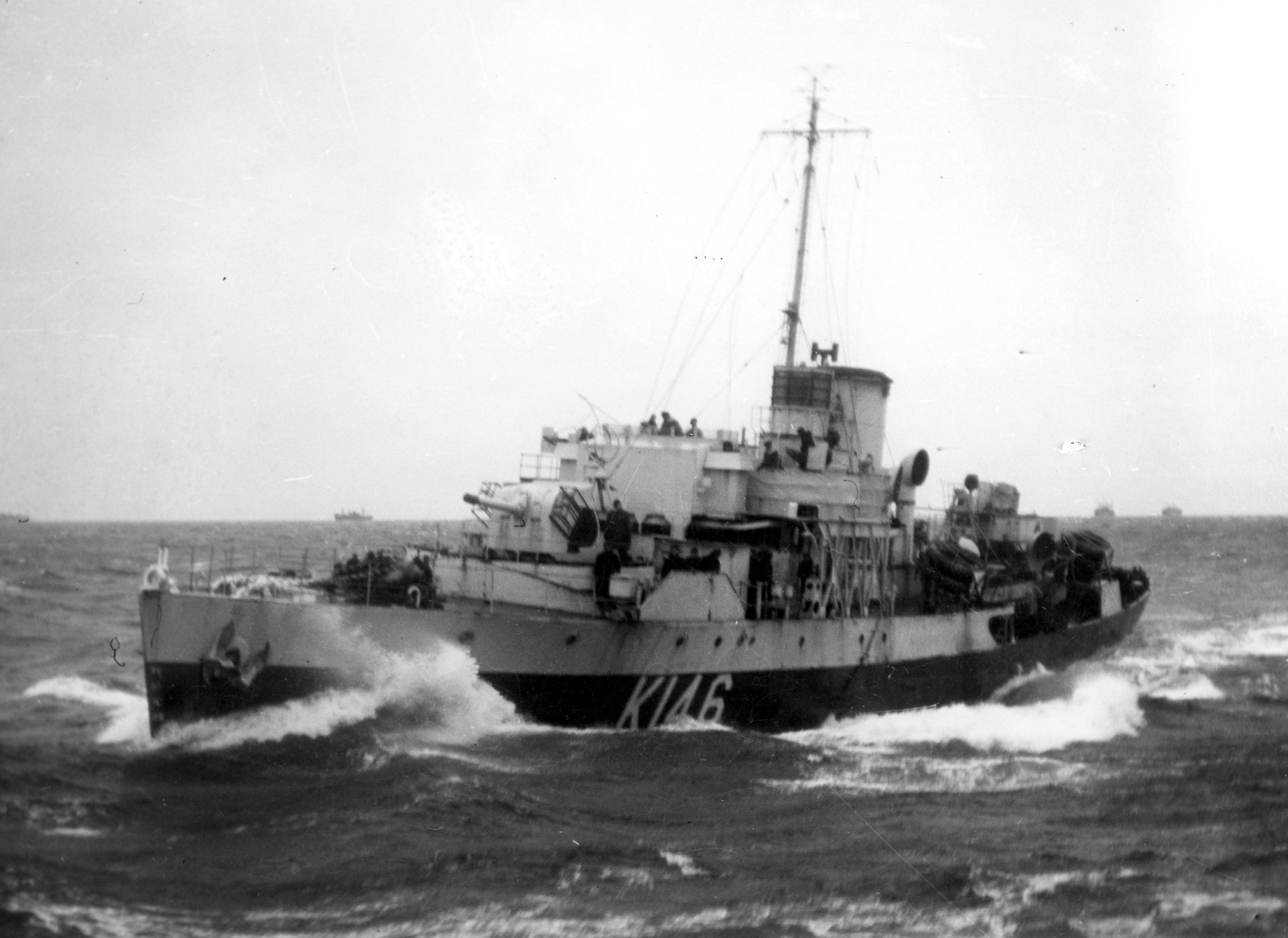
Canadian corvette Pictou had survived three North Atlantic winters of U-boat wolf packs before being entrusted with the safety of the largest trade convoy of the Second World War.

== Escorting warships ==
Ships sailing from New York were escorted by United States Navy submarine chasers SC 1338 and SC 1340, and by Western Local Escort Force (WLEF) Algerine-class minesweeper Portage and Flower-class corvettes Chicoutimi, Kamsack and The Pas. Ships sailing from Halifax were escorted by WLEF minesweeper Winnipeg and corvettes Arvida, Pictou, Lethbridge and Rosthern. Rosthern and the escorts from New York were detached when the remaining ships from Halifax assumed responsibility for the convoy on 20 July. Ships sailing from Sydney were escorted by WLEF Isles-class trawlers Baffin and Miscou, and Norwegian King Haakon VII. The escorting warships from Sydney detached from the convoy after the escorting warships from Halifax assumed responsibility for the ships from Sydney on 22 July. The four warships from Halifax were detached when Mid-Ocean Escort Force group C5 River-class frigate Dunver and corvettes Dauphin, Wetaskiwin, New Westminster, Hespeler, Algoma, and Long Branch assumed responsibility for the convoy on 24 July. The latter two corvettes had escorted the merchant ships sailing from St. Johns. Naval trawlers HMS Cape Mariato and HMS Southern Spray assumed responsibility for the convoy in the Western Approaches on 2 August. The convoy was not attacked by submarines and arrived in United Kingdom ports by 3 August 1944.

== Results ==
After the seven Canadian warships of escort group C5 brought the largest convoy of the Battle of the Atlantic safely across the mid-ocean, many of the convoy's ships began offloading food, fuel, and materials to support the civilian population of the British Isles. One ship from the convoy waited in Loch Ewe to carry supplies to the United States garrison in Iceland; nine ships waited in the Firth of Clyde until convoy JW 59 formed to carry war materials to the Soviet Union; and 46 waited at Oban until channel ports were ready for them to offload food, fuel, and ammunition for Allied armies moving east from France, and trucks, jeeps, half-tracks, and locomotives to move those supplies to the front. HX 300 was one of six hundred World War II trade convoys from North America to the British Isles. The following list describes the British, American, Norwegian, Greek, Dutch, Panamanian, Polish, Yugoslavian, French, and Swedish ships of this convoy and the cargoes they were transporting.

== Merchant Ships ==
Name	Flag	Destination	Tonnage (GRT)	Cargo	Notes
Agia Marina (1912)	Greece	Avonmouth	4,151	Grain & armoured fighting vehicles	Joined from Sydney
Albert S. Burleson (1943)	United States	Europe	7,244	General cargo	Liberty ship fitted with Anti-torpedo Net Device
Aleksandar I (1927)	Yugoslavia	Liverpool	5,948	Sugar	
Alexander Ramsey (1942)	United States	Immingham	7,181	General cargo including explosives	Liberty ship joined from Halifax
Amelia Earhart (1942)	United States	Europe	7,176	General cargo including motor vehicles	Liberty ship
American Press (1920)	United States	Port of Hull	5,131	General cargo including explosives	Joined from Halifax
Ancylus (1935)	United Kingdom	Clyde	8,017	USN fuels	Merchant aircraft carrier tanker ferrying a deck-load of non-operational aircraft joined from St.John's, Newfoundland
Andrew Turnbull (1944)	United States	Europe	7,240	General cargo including motor vehicles	Liberty ship
Anna N Goulandris (1921)	Greece	Thames	4,358	Grain	Joined from Sydney
Anson P. K. Safford (1943)	United States	Europe	7,176	Explosives	Liberty ship
Anthony Wayne (1942)	United States	Liverpool	7,181	Landing craft and locomotives	Liberty ship
Athelduke (1929)	United Kingdom	Bromborough	8,966	Molasses	
Athelprince (1926)	United Kingdom	Salt End	8,782	Molasses	Joined from Sydney
Athelregent (1930)	United Kingdom	Greenock	8,881	Molasses	Carried 59 spare depth charges for escorting warships
Augustus P. Loring (1944)	United States	Thames	7,176	General cargo	Liberty ship
B. F. Shaw (1943)	United States	Europe	7,176	General cargo	Liberty ship
Baxtergate (1925)	United Kingdom	Thames	5,531	Wheat	Joined from Sydney
Ben A. Ruffin (1944)	United States	Europe	7,182	General cargo including motor vehicles	Liberty ship
Bente Maersk (1928)	United Kingdom	Firth of Clyde	5,722	Gas oil	Serving as escort oiler
Bernhard (1924)	Norway	Liverpool	3,563	Sugar	
Billy Mitchell (1943)	United States	Europe	7,176	General cargo	Liberty ship
Bonita (1918)	Panama	Thames	4,929	Lumber	Joined from Sydney
British Colonel (1921)	United Kingdom	Leith	6,999	Gas oil	Serving as escort oiler carrying 70 spare depth charges for escorting warships
British Promise (1942)	United Kingdom	Soviet Union	8,443	Alcohol	Cargo loaded at Philadelphia
Cairnvalona (1918)	United Kingdom	Tyne	4,929	Refrigerated general cargo	Joined from Sydney fitted with HF/DF
Calobre (1919)	Panama	Belfast	6,891	Motor vehicles	
Cataraqui Park (1944)	United States	Bristol	2,877	Lumber	Joined from Sydney
Charles Brantley Aycock (1942)	United States	Newport	7,176	Explosives and poison gas	Liberty ship
Charles D. McIver (1943)	United States	Europe	7,176	General cargo including motor vehicles	Liberty ship fitted with Anti-torpedo Net Device
Charles Dauray (1944)	United States	Soviet Union	7,176	General cargo including locomotives	Liberty ship
Charles J. Folger (1943)	United States	Immingham	7,194	General cargo including explosives	Liberty ship joined from Halifax
Chesapeake (1928)	United Kingdom	Firth of Clyde	8,955	Diesel oil and aircraft	Serving as escort oiler carrying 58 spare depth charges for escorting warships
Christine Marie (1919)	United Kingdom	Rochester	3,895	Woodpulp	Joined from St.John's, Newfoundland
Christopher Gadsden (1942)	United States	Europe	7,177	General cargo	Liberty ship joined from Halifax
City of Lancaster (1924)	United Kingdom	Thames	3,041	Asphalt, sugar & rum	
City of Leicester (1926)	United Kingdom	Manchester	3,351	Flour & general cargo	Joined from Sydney
Clan MacInnes (1920)	United Kingdom	Avonmouth	4,672	Flour & general cargo	Joined from Halifax
Clark Howell (1944)	United States	Soviet Union	7,198	General cargo including locomotives	Liberty ship
Clyde L. Seavey (1943)	United States	Europe	7,176	General cargo	Liberty ship
Clydefield (1928)	United Kingdom	Scapa Flow	7,365	Fuel oil	
Cyrus T. Brady (1943)	United States	Europe	7,176	General cargo including motor vehicles	Liberty ship
Dalhanna (1930)	United Kingdom	Liverpool	5,571	Lard & general cargo	
Daniel Drake (1943)	United States	Europe	7,176	General cargo including motor vehicles	Liberty ship
David Bushnell (1942)	United States	Liverpool	7,181	Explosives	Liberty ship
Daylight (1931)	United States	Heysham	9,180	Petrol, oil & barges	
Dimitrios Chandris (1910)	Greece	Thames	4,643	General cargo	Joined form Sydney
Dolly Madison (1943)	United States	Europe	7,176	General cargo including explosives	Liberty ship
Dramatist (1920)	United Kingdom	Liverpool	5,443	General cargo	
Eastern Guide (1918)	United States	Loch Ewe	3,704	General cargo including lumber and 300 depth charges bound for Iceland	
Edward J. Filene (1944)	United States	Europe	7,240	General cargo including motor vehicles	Liberty ship
Edward Bellamy (1943)	United States	Europe	7,176	General cargo	Liberty ship
Edward L. Grant (1943)	United States	Soviet Union	7,176	General cargo including locomotives	Liberty ship
Elg (1930)	Norway	Greenock	4,014	Sugar & rum	
Elijah Kellogg (1944)	United States	Soviet Union	7,176	Locomotives & machinery	Liberty ship
Elijah White (1942)	United States	Europe	7,176	General cargo including motor vehicles	Liberty ship
Eliphalet Nott (1943)	United States	Europe	7,176	General cargo	Liberty ship joined from Halifax
Elisabeth Dal (1910)	United Kingdom	Manchester	4,258	Wheat	Joined from Sydney; constructive total loss following collision
Elizabeth Blackwell (1943)	United States	Europe	7,176	General cargo including pontoons	Liberty ship
Empire MacCallum (1943)	United Kingdom	Liverpool	8,252	Grain	Merchant aircraft carrier joined from Halifax
Empire Mallory (1941)	United Kingdom	Avonmouth	6,327	Ore concentrates	
Empire Mouflon (1921)	United Kingdom	Hartlepool	3,234	General cargo including explosives	Joined from Sydney
Empire Pibroch (1942)	United Kingdom	Liverpool	7,046	Refrigerated general cargo	Carried convoy commodore RADM Sir A T Tillard KBE DSO
Empire Treasure (1943)	United Kingdom	Liverpool	7,022	Meat, flour & general cargo	Joined from Halifax fitted with Anti-torpedo Net Device
Evanger (1920)	Norway	Tyne	3,869	General cargo including barges	
Exilona (1919)	United States	Europe	4,971	General cargo including motor vehicles	
Ferncourt (1938)	Norway	Manchester	9,918	Diesel oil & armoured fighting vehicles	Serving as escort oiler
Fluor Spar (1919)	United States	Cardiff	5,055	General cargo including explosives	Joined from Halifax
Fort Nipagon (1942)	United Kingdom	Thames	7,132	General cargo	
Francis D. Culkin (1944)	United States	Europe	7,210	General cargo including motor vehicles	Liberty ship
Francis N. Smith (1943)	United States	Europe	7,176	Explosives	Liberty ship fitted with Anti-torpedo Net Device
Frank Wiggins (1943)	United States	Immingham	7,176	General cargo including explosives	Liberty ship
Franka (1918)	Yugoslavia	Liverpool	5,273	Sugar	
Frontenac (1928)	Norway	Portsmouth	7,350	USN fuel	Serving as escort oiler carrying 10 spare depth charges for escorting warships
Gabriel Duval (1942)	United States	Europe	7,176	General cargo including motor vehicles	Liberty ship
Gatineau Park (1942)	United Kingdom	Hull	7,128	General cargo including ammunition	Joined from Sydney fitted with Anti-torpedo Net Device
George P. Garrison (1943)	United States	Europe	7,244	General cargo	Liberty ship joined from Halifax fitted with Anti-torpedo Net Device
Georgian (1920)	United States	Europe	5,825	General cargo including motor vehicles	
Gerard Dou (1941)	Netherlands	Thames	7,242	Sugar & general cargo	Carried convoy vice-commodore Vice-Admiral Sir R H O Lane-Poole KBE CB
Gerassimos Vergottis (1920)	Greece	Liverpool	6,343	Woodpulp	Joined from Halifax
Glarona (1928)	Norway	Manchester	9,912	Crude oil & aircraft	
Gylfe (1930)	Norway	Grangemouth	6,129	Diesel fuel	
Hall J. Kelley (1943)	United States	Europe	7,180	Military stores including motor vehicles	Liberty ship
Hartlepool (1932)	United Kingdom	Tyne	5,500	Lumber	Joined from Sydney
Helder (1920)	Netherlands	Liverpool	3,629	Sugar & rum	Joined from Halifax
Henrik Ibsen (1906)	Norway	Ipswich	4,671	Grain	Joined from Sydney
Hoegh Hood (1936)	Norway	Liverpool	9,351	USN fuel & aircraft	
Horace H. Harvey (1943)	United States	Scapa Flow	7,218	USN fuel	Liberty ship
Horace Williams (1943)	United States	Europe	7,176	General cargo including explosives & motor vehicles	Liberty ship
Howard T. Ricketts (1943)	United States	Port of Hull	7,176	General cargo including explosives	Liberty ship joined from Halifax
James B. Duke (1944)	United States	Immingham	7,200	Explosives & machinery	Liberty ship
James Bowdoin (1943)	United States	Europe	7,176	General cargo	Liberty ship joined from Halifax fitted with Anti-torpedo Net Device
James Ives (1943)	United States	Europe	7,176	General cargo including motor vehicles	Liberty ship
Jan Van Goyen (1919)	Netherlands	Thames	5,704	Sugar & powdered milk	
Jean Baptiste Le Moyne (1943)	United States	Firth of Clyde	7,218	USN fuel	Liberty ship
John B. Hamilton (1944)	United States	Glasgow	7,247	General cargo including tractors & sulfur	Liberty ship
John Catron (1943)	United States	Europe	7,176	General cargo including trailers	Liberty ship fitted with Anti-torpedo Net Device
John La Farge (1943)	United States	Firth of Clyde	7,176	Locomotives & building materials	Liberty ship
John McLoughlin (1942)	United States	Europe	7,176	General cargo	Liberty ship
John Mitchell (1942)	United States	Europe	7,191	General cargo including motor vehicles	Liberty ship
John W. Garrett (1943)	United States	Europe	7,176	General cargo	Liberty ship
Junior Van Noy (1919)	United States	Europe	2,372	Military stores & explosives	Army repair ship
Kohistan (1933)	United Kingdom	Glasgow	5,884	General cargo	
Kronprinsessen Margareta (1914)	Sweden	Swansea	3,746	General cargo	
Lansdowne Park (1943)	United Kingdom	Manchester	2,861	Woodpulp	Joined from Halifax
Leo J. Duster (1943)	United States	Soviet Union	7,176	General cargo including explosives and locomotives	Liberty ship
Lista (1920)	Norway	Manchester	3,671	General cargo including motor vehicles	
Lucerna (1930)	United Kingdom	Thames	6,556	Gas oil	Serving as escort oiler carrying 50 spare depth charges for escorting warships
Macoma (1936)	Netherlands	Firth of Clyde	8,069	USN fuel	Merchant aircraft carrier joined from Halifax
Maliakos (1912)	Greece	Thames	3,903	Woodpulp	Joined from Sydney
Margarita Chandris (1920)	Greece	Thames	5,401	Grain	Joined from Sydney
Maud (1930)	Norway	Liverpool	3,189	Sugar	
Merchant Royal (1928)	United Kingdom	Manchester	5,008	Newsprint	Joined from Sydney
Michael J. Stone (1942)	United States	Europe	7,176	General cargo including motor vehicles	Liberty ship
Mimosa (1905)	Greece	Thames	3,071	Lumber	Joined from Sydney
Minerva (1930)	Norway	Liverpool	5,883	General cargo including landing craft	
Mobile City (1920)	United States	Europe	6,157	General cargo	Joined from Halifax
Morska Wola (1924)	Poland	Garston, Merseyside	3,208	General cargo including explosives	
Mount Othrys (1919)	Greece	Leith	6,527	Grain	Joined from Sydney
Nacella (1943)	United Kingdom	Soviet Union	8,196	Aviation gasoline	Fitted with Anti-torpedo Net Device
Nanceen (1929)	France	Thames	2,895	Woodpulp & motor vehicles	Joined from Halifax
Nathan Clifford (1943)	United States	Europe	7,200	General cargo including motor vehicles	Liberty ship
Nathaniel Matthews (1944)	United Kingdom	Hartlepool	2,437	General cargo	
Noah Brown (1944)	United States	Avonmouth	7,240	General cargo	Liberty ship
Norma (1930)	Norway	Liverpool	4,487	Sugar & general cargo	
Norsk Tank (1928)	Norway	Manchester	9,720	Fuel oil	
Ocean Fame (1942)	United Kingdom	Thames	7,173	Sugar	Fitted with Anti-torpedo Net Device
Odysseus (1913)	Greece	Thames	4,577	Ammunition & general cargo	
Oscar Chappell (1943)	United States	Europe	7,244	General cargo	Liberty ship joined from Halifax
Ovula (1938)	Netherlands	Southampton	6,256	Diesel fuel and aircraft	Serving as escort oiler
Peik (1930)	Norway	Derry	6,099	Furnace fuel oil	Joined from Halifax
Pencarrow (1921)	United Kingdom	Cardiff	4,841	Grain	Joined from Sydney
Peter V. Daniel (1942)	United States	Europe	7,176	Explosives	Liberty ship
Pierre Gibault (1943)	United States	Europe	7,176	General cargo including motor vehicles and explosives	Liberty ship
Pomona (1920)	United States	Europe	7,583	General cargo	Joined from Halifax
Prometheus (1925)	United Kingdom	Liverpool	6,095	General cargo including motor vehicles	Joined from Halifax
Rapana (1935)	United Kingdom	Firth of Clyde	8,017	USN fuel	Merchant aircraft carrier joined from Halifax
Riley (1936)	United Kingdom	Manchester	4,993	Grain	Joined from Sydney
Robert M. La Follette (1943)	United States	Europe	7,191	General cargo including motor vehicles	Liberty ship
Rudby (1924)	United Kingdom	River Tyne	4,846	Grain	Joined from Halifax
Saintonge (1936)	United Kingdom	Thames	9,386	USN fuel	Serving as escort oiler carrying 60 spare depth charges for escorting warships
Salando (1920)	Netherlands	Thames	5,272	General cargo including motor vehicles	
Samfield (1943)	United Kingdom	Manchester	7,219	Steel & lumber	Fitted with Anti-torpedo Net Device
Samsperrin (1944)	United Kingdom	Liverpool	7,219	Grain	
Samuel Ashe (1942)	United States	Europe	7,177	General cargo including motor vehicles	Liberty ship
Samuel Johnson (1942)	United States	Europe	7,191	General cargo	Liberty ship
Samuel Nelson (1942)	United States	Europe	7,176	Motor vehicles	Liberty ship
Samuel Parker (1942)	United States	Europe	7,176	General cargo	Liberty ship joined from Halifax
San Valerio (1913)	United Kingdom	Isle of Grain	6,493	Furnace fuel oil	Serving as escort oiler
Senga (1913)	Yugoslavia	Glasgow	5,140	Steel & woodpulp	Joined from Sydney
Silas Weir Mitchell (1943)	United States	Firth of Clyde	7,176	Locomotives and explosives	Liberty ship fitted with Anti-torpedo Net Device
Skeldergate (1930)	United Kingdom	Manchester	4,251	Woodpulp	Joined from Sydney
Solstad (1927)	Norway	Birkenhead	5,952	Lubricating oil	
Stalowa Wola (1924)	Poland	Sunderland	3,133	General cargo including explosives	
Suerte (1910)	Panama		3,649		
Thomas Donaldson (1944)	United States	Soviet Union	7,210	General cargo including explosives	Liberty ship
Thorshov (1935)	Norway	London	9,955	Diesel fuel and aircraft	Serving as escort oiler carrying 60 spare depth charges for escorting warships
Tilapa (1928)	United Kingdom	Thames	5,392	Meat and general cargo	Joined from Halifax
Torr Head (1937)	United Kingdom	Glasgow	5,021	Metal & general cargo	Veteran of convoy ON 67; joined from Halifax
Trocas (1927)	United Kingdom	Thames	7,406	Furnace fuel oil	
Tynebank (1922)	United Kingdom	Liverpool	4,651	Sugar	
Voco (1925)	United Kingdom	Birkenhead	5,090	Lubricating oil	Carried 60 spare depth charges for escorting warships
Warren Delano (1944)	United States	Soviet Union	7,210	General cargo including locomotives	Liberty ship
William R. Davie (1942)	United States	Liverpool	7,177	General cargo including explosives	Liberty ship
Wind Rush (1918)	United States	Cardiff	5,586	Motor vehicles and explosives	Veteran of convoy JW 51A and convoy ON 166
Winona (1919)	United States	Liverpool	6,197	General cargo including ammunition and motor vehicles	Veteran of convoy SC 7
Wisla (1928)	Poland	Bristol	3,106	General cargo	Veteran of convoy ON 154; joined from Halifax
Zamalek (1921)	United Kingdom		1,567		convoy rescue ship; veteran of convoy PQ 17 and convoy SC 130
Zane Grey (1943)	United States	Europe	7,176	General cargo including motor vehicles	Liberty ship
