= HMS Portchester Castle =

British corvette

History

United Kingdom
- Name: Portchester Castle
- Ordered: 6 February 1943
- Builder: Swan Hunter, Wallsend
- Laid down: 17 March 1943
- Launched: 21 June 1943
- Identification: Pennant number: K362
- Fate: paid off 1947 and broken up 14 May 1958

General characteristics
- Class & type: Castle-class corvette
- Displacement: 1,010 long tons (1,030 t) (standard)
- Length: 252 ft (76.8 m)
- Beam: 33 ft (10.1 m)
- Draught: 13 ft 9 in (4.2 m) (deep load)
- Installed power: 2 Admiralty 3-drum boilers; 2,880 ihp (2,150 kW)
- Propulsion: 1 shaft, 1 triple-expansion engine
- Speed: 16.5 knots (30.6 km/h; 19.0 mph)
- Range: 6,500 nmi (12,000 km; 7,500 mi) at 15 knots (28 km/h; 17 mph)
- Complement: 99
- Sensors & processing systems: Type 145 and Type 147 ASDIC; Type 272 search radar; HF/DF radio direction finder
- Armament: 1 × QF 4 in (102 mm) DP gun; 2 × twin, 2 × single 20 mm (0.8 in) AA guns; 1 × 3-barrel Squid anti-submarine mortar; 1 × depth charge rail and 2 throwers; 15 depth charges

HMS Portchester Castle (K362) was a Castle-class corvette built in 1943 and scrapped in 1958. She was the only ship of the Royal Navy to be named after Portchester Castle in Hampshire. She was involved in the sinking of two German U-boats during her wartime career. Post-war she was used in two feature films and a comedy.

== Construction and career ==
She was launched on 21 June 1943 at Swan Hunter shipyard in Newcastle upon Tyne.

=== Sinking of U-484 ===
On 9 September 1944 Portchester Castle and Helmsdale sank the German submarine U-484 in the North Atlantic north-west of Ireland, in position 55°45′N 11°41′W.

=== Sinking of U-1200 ===
As one of four ships in 30th Escort Group under the command of Denys Rayner, Portchester Castle shared in the sinking of the German submarine U-1200 south of Ireland (in position 50°24′N 09°10′W) on 11 November 1944, along with her sister ships Launceston Castle, Pevensey Castle and Kenilworth Castle.

=== Decommissioning ===
She was paid off in 1947 and scrapped at Troon, Scotland on 14 May 1958.

== Film appearances ==
In 1951 Portchester Castle was employed to represent the fictitious HMS Saltash Castle in the film The Cruel Sea (1953). The ship was also seen in the film The Man Who Never Was (1955) and The Navy Lark (1959). In both Sea and Lark she is shown wearing the pennant number F362 rather than her own K362.

== Bibliography ==
- Campbell, N. J. M. (1980). "Great Britain (including Empire Forces)". In Chesneau, Roger (ed.). Conway's All the World's Fighting Ships 1922–1946. Greenwich, UK: Conway Maritime Press. pp. 2–85. ISBN 0-85177-146-7.
- Colledge, J. J.; Warlow, Ben (2006) [1969]. Ships of the Royal Navy: The Complete Record of All Fighting Ships of the Royal Navy from the 15th Century to the Present (3rd Rev ed.). London: Chatham Publishing. ISBN 978-1-86176-281-8. OCLC 67375475.
- Goodwin, Norman; compiled by (2007). Castle Class Corvettes: An Account of the Service of the Ships and of Their Ships' Companies. Liskeard, UK: Maritime Books. ISBN 978-1-904459-27-9.
- Lenton, H. T. (1998). British & Empire Warships of the Second World War. Annapolis, Maryland: Naval Institute Press. ISBN 1-55750-048-7.
- Rayner, D.A., Escort: The Battle of the Atlantic, London: William Kimber, pp. 224–229
