= HMS Pevensey Castle =

History

United Kingdom
- Name: Pevensey Castle
- Namesake: Pevensey Castle
- Builder: Harland & Wolff
- Yard number: 1239
- Laid down: 21 June 1943
- Launched: 11 January 1944
- Completed: 10 June 1944
- Commissioned: 10 June 1944
- Decommissioned: February 1946
- Identification: Pennant number: K449
- Fate: Converted to a weather ship in 1959

United Kingdom
- Name: Weather Monitor (1962); Admiral Beaufort (1976)
- Acquired: 1959
- Fate: Scrapped, 1982

General characteristics (as built)
- Class & type: Castle-class corvette
- Displacement: 1,010 long tons (1,030 t) (standard); 1,510 long tons (1,530 t) (deep load)
- Length: 252 ft (76.8 m)
- Beam: 33 ft (10.1 m)
- Draught: 14 ft (4.3 m)
- Installed power: 2 Admiralty 3-drum boilers; 2,880 ihp (2,150 kW)
- Propulsion: 1 shaft, 1 triple-expansion engine
- Speed: 16.5 knots (30.6 km/h; 19.0 mph)
- Range: 6,500 nmi (12,000 km; 7,500 mi) at 15 knots (28 km/h; 17 mph)
- Complement: 99
- Sensors & processing systems: Type 145 and Type 147 ASDIC; Type 272 search radar; HF/DF radio direction finder
- Armament: 1 × QF 4 in (102 mm) DP gun; 2 × twin, 2 × single 20 mm (0.8 in) AA guns; 1 × 3-barrel Squid anti-submarine mortar; 1 × depth charge rail and 2 throwers; 15 depth charges

HMS Pevensey Castle was a Castle-class corvette built for the United Kingdom's Royal Navy during World War II and saw service during the war as a convoy escort. Following the war, the ship was converted into a weather ship and remained as such until being withdrawn from service in 1981 and scrapped in 1982.

== Construction and career ==
Pevensey Castle, named for the castle in Pevensey, was built by Harland & Wolff in Belfast, and launched on 11 January 1944. The ship was commissioned in June 1944.

=== World War II ===
In World War II, as part of 30th Escort Group under the command of Denys Rayner, Pevensey Castle shared in the sinking of the German submarine U-1200 south of Ireland on 11 November 1944, along with sister ships Launceston Castle, Portchester Castle and Kenilworth Castle.

=== Weather ship ===
In 1960/61 she was converted at Blyth to the weather ship Weather Monitor. She was upgraded at the Manchester Dry Docks Company in 1976 and renamed Admiral Beaufort

=== Fate ===
She was withdrawn from service in 1981 and scrapped at Troon in 1982.

== Bibliography ==
- Campbell, N. J. M. (1980). "Great Britain (including Empire Forces)". In Chesneau, Roger (ed.). Conway's All the World's Fighting Ships 1922–1946. Greenwich, UK: Conway Maritime Press. pp. 2–85. ISBN 0-85177-146-7.
- Colledge, J. J.; Warlow, Ben (2006) [1969]. Ships of the Royal Navy: The Complete Record of All Fighting Ships of the Royal Navy from the 15th Century to the Present (3rd Rev ed.). London: Chatham Publishing. ISBN 978-1-86176-281-8. OCLC 67375475.
- Goodwin, Norman; compiled by (2007). Castle Class Corvettes: An Account of the Service of the Ships and of Their Ships' Companies. Liskeard, UK: Maritime Books. ISBN 978-1-904459-27-9.
- Lenton, H. T. (1998). British & Empire Warships of the Second World War. Annapolis, Maryland: Naval Institute Press. ISBN 1-55750-048-7.
