= Nomad 22 =

1960s recreational keelboat

Development
- Designer: Denys Rayner
- Location: United Kingdom
- Year: 1967
- No. built: 267
- Builder: Westerly Marine Construction
- Name: Nomad 22

Boat
- Displacement: 3,150 lb (1,429 kg)
- Draft: 2.25 ft (0.69 m)

Hull
- Type: monohull
- Construction: FRP
- LOA: 22.25 ft (6.78 m)
- LWL: 18.33 ft (5.59 m)
- Beam: 7.42 ft (2.26 m)
- Engine: outboard motor

Hull appendages
- Keel: twin keels
- Ballast: 1,050 lb (476 kg)
- Rudder: internally-mounted spade-type rudder

Rig
- Rig type: Bermuda rig
- I foretriangle height: 23.00 ft (7.01 m)
- J foretriangle base: 7.00 ft (2.13 m)
- P mainsail luff: 21.75 ft (6.63 m)
- E mainsail foot: 9.75 ft (2.97 m)

Sails
- Sailplan: masthead sloop
- Mainsail area: 106.03 sq ft (9.851 m^{2})
- Jib/genoa area: 80.50 sq ft (7.479 m^{2})
- Total sail area: 186.53 sq ft (17.329 m^{2})

Racing
- PHRF: 300

The Nomad 22 is a recreational keelboat that is a development of the Westerly 22. It was built by Westerly Marine Construction in the United Kingdom, between 1967 and 1969, with 267 completed.

== Design ==
The Nomad 22 is built predominantly of glassfibre, with wood trim. It has a masthead sloop rig, a spooned raked stem, an angled transom, an internally mounted spade-type rudder controlled by a tiller and twin fixed keels, plus a centre skeg. It displaces 3,150 lb (1,429 kg) and carries 1,050 lb (476 kg) of ballast.

The boat has a draft of 2.25 ft (0.69 m) with the standard twin keels.

The boat is normally fitted with a small 6 to 8 hp (4 to 6 kW) outboard motor for docking and manoeuvring. A small Volvo Penta diesel or petrol Vire inboard engine was optional.

The design has sleeping accommodation for four people, with a double "V"-berth in the bow cabin, an L-shaped settee and two straight settee berths in the main cabin. The galley is located on both sides amidships. The galley is equipped with a stove to port and a sink on the starboard side. The head is located just aft of the bow cabin on the starboard side. Cabin headroom is 55 in (140 cm).

For sailing the design may be equipped with one a series of jibs or genoas.

The design has a PHRF racing average handicap of 300 and a hull speed of 5.7 kn (10.6 km/h).

== Reception ==
In a 2010 review Steve Henkel wrote, "best features: She will sit on a half-tide mooring, thanks to her twin keels. A flatbed trailer will serve as a road conveyance. If a dodger is added, headroom becomes almost six feet. Worst features: Due to exceptionally large wetted surface, shallow twin keels and smallish sail area, it will take a good while to get anywhere, especially if 'anywhere' happens to be upwind. And if you plan to short-circuit your trip by motoring, get a tow car that can handle 5,500 pounds."
