= The Enemy Below =

1957 film by Dick Powell

- Movie Poster
- Directed by: Dick Powell
- Screenplay by: Wendell Mayes
- Based on: The Enemy Below by Denys Rayner
- Produced by: Dick Powell
- Starring: Robert Mitchum; Curd Jürgens
- Cinematography: Harold Rosson
- Edited by: Stuart Gilmore
- Music by: Leigh Harline
- Distributed by: 20th Century Fox
- Release date: December 25, 1957 (New York City)
- Running time: 98 minutes
- Country: United States
- Language: English
- Budget: $1,910,000

The Enemy Below is a 1957 American DeLuxe Color war film in CinemaScope about a battle between an American destroyer escort and a German U-boat during World War II. It stars Robert Mitchum and Curt Jürgens as the American and German commanding officers, respectively. Produced and directed by Dick Powell, the film was based on the 1956 novel of the same name by Denys Rayner, a British naval officer involved in antisubmarine warfare throughout the Battle of the Atlantic.

== Plot ==
During World War II the American Buckley-class destroyer escort USS Haynes is on patrol in the South Atlantic. Lieutenant Commander Murrell, a former Third Mate in the Merchant Marine and now an active-duty officer in the Naval Reserve, has recently taken command of the ship. He is still recovering from injuries sustained when his previous ship was sunk by a German U-boat, and he was left adrift for 21 days. The crew questions the new captain's fitness and ability. A nearby German U-boat is commanded by Kapitän zur See von Stolberg, a wily former World War I Unterseeboot skipper who resents fighting for a Nazi regime he detests.

The two vessels engage in a game of cat-and-mouse, and each captain must guess what his counterpart's next move will be. Murrell subjects von Stolberg's crew to hourly depth-charge attacks, trying to force him to surface where his ship is more vulnerable. Von Stolberg analyzes Murrell's predictable pattern of attacks and succeeds in torpedoing the Haynes. Murrell orders his fires set on the deck to make the damage look worse than it actually is, then abandon ship. He retains a skeleton crew to man the bridge, engine room, and one of the three-inch (76 mm) guns. Von Stolberg falls for the gambit and surfaces to fire another torpedo to finish Haynes off, but Murrell rams the U-boat with the bow of the Haynes before it can fire, riding up over its foredeck and becoming stuck. With his own vessel foundering, von Stolberg orders his crew to set scuttling charges and abandon ship, putting the Haynes in further peril.

Murrell, the last man aboard, is about to join his crew in the lifeboats when he spots von Stolberg standing on the conning tower of the U-boat. He refuses to abandon his mortally-wounded executive officer Oberleutnant zur See Heinie Schwaffer, who has been with him since "academy days". Murrell tosses a line to the submarine and rescues the pair. Lieutenant Ware returns in the captain's gig with a mixed party of American and German sailors, who race up the cargo nets to save the last survivors before the tangled vessels blow up.

After rescue by another U.S. Navy vessel, German seamen give Schwaffer a burial at sea with the Haynes crew respectfully attending. On the stern, Murrell offers von Stolberg a cigarette as an olive branch. Von Stolberg, bitter about losing his ship, over losing his good friend, and about what has become of his country, says "I should have died a dozen times over, Captain. This time, it was your fault." Murrell says "Fine, next time I won't throw you the rope." Von Stolberg chides back amicably, "Oh, I think you will."

== Cast ==
- Robert Mitchum as Captain Murrell
- Curd Jürgens as Kapitän zur See von Stolberg
- Theodore Bikel as Oberleutnant zur See "Heinie" Schwaffer, von Stolberg's second in command
- David Hedison as Lieutenant Ware, the executive officer of Haynes (as Al Hedison)
- Russell Collins as Doctor
- Kurt Kreuger as Von Holem
- Frank Albertson as Lieutenant (junior grade) Crain
- Biff Elliot as Quartermaster
- Ralph Manza as Lieutenant Bonelli (uncredited)
- Doug McClure as Ensign Merry (uncredited)
- Darryl F. Zanuck as Chief petty officer (uncredited)

== Production ==
=== Writing ===
The screenplay, which was adapted by Wendell Mayes, differs substantially from the original book. In the novel, the ship is British, but in the film, it is American. The screenplay's final scenes of mutual respect between the protagonists are not taken from the book. In the book, the destroyer captain takes a swing at the U-boat captain while they are in the lifeboat because the U-boat captain claims that the destroyer crewmen are his prisoners. The film also alludes to evil in man (as personified by a concept such as the "devil") being the real "enemy" ("You cut off one head and it grows another..."), the force within that drives one man against another, or even against himself.

The screenplay has historical precedence. On 6 May 1944, USS Buckley, which was the lead ship of the same destroyer escort class portrayed in The Enemy Below, actually rammed and sank a U-boat in combat before capturing many of the German crew.

Mayes preferred the original ending where the two captains died, after the American tried to rescue the German. "The point was Dick and I both felt that these two characters were men who had no reason to live," said Mayes. "There's much more feeling if they should die, one finally trying to help the other after killing him. But the studio said, "No, you like both of them. You can't kill them. It'll disappoint the audience."...One of those things one must do."

=== Casting ===
The anti-Nazi U-boat captain was portrayed by actor Curd Jürgens, who had been an actual critic of Nazism in his native Germany. In 1944, after filming Wiener Mädeln, he got into an argument with Robert Kaltenbrunner (brother of high-ranking Austrian SS official Ernst Kaltenbrunner), SS-Obersturmbannführer Otto Skorzeny, and a member of Baldur von Schirach's staff in a Viennese bar without knowing who they were. Jürgens was arrested and sent to a labor camp for the "politically unreliable" in Hungary. After a few weeks, he managed to escape and went into hiding. Jürgens became an Austrian citizen after the war.

The destroyer escort USS Haynes (DE-181) was represented in the film by the USS Whitehurst (DE-634), provided by the US Navy in Pearl Harbor. Many of the actual ship's crew appear in the film, such as the phone talkers, the gun and depth charge crews, and all of the men seen abandoning ship. The Whitehurst's commanding officer, Lieutenant Commander Walter Smith, played the engineering officer. He is the man seen reading comics (Little Orphan Annie) during the lull before the action while an enlisted man is reading The Decline and Fall of the Roman Empire. The Whitehurst was sunk as a target in 1971. The real DE-181 was USS Straub (DE-181), a Cannon-class destroyer escort (scrapped 1974).

=== Filming ===
Despite being set in the South Atlantic, filming of the open ocean scenes took place in the Pacific Ocean near Oahu, Hawaii. A ship collision set and filming of the abandon ship scenes took place off of Los Angeles.

== Music ==
The tune sung by the U-boat crew on the ocean floor between depth-charge attacks is from an 18th-century march called "Der Dessauer Marsch," known by the first line of lyrics as "So leben wir" ("That's how we live"). The burial hymn in the final scene is "Ich hatt' einen Kameraden".

== Reception ==
Stanley Kauffmann of The New Republic described The Enemy Below as a 'compact, competently written, ably acted little drama'. On the review aggregator website Rotten Tomatoes, 86% of 7 critics' reviews are positive.

According to Mayes the film "was not a financial success for some reason, although on television it has become one of the big pictures—but it got good critical notices."

=== Awards and nominations ===
For the audio effects, Walter Rossi received the 1958 Academy Award for Best Special Effects. The film was also awarded as the best sound-edited feature of 1957 by the Motion Picture Sound Editors.

== In popular culture ==
- The 1966 Star Trek episode "Balance of Terror" is closely based on the film, with the USS Enterprise cast as the destroyer and the Romulan vessel, using a cloaking device, as the U-boat.
- Nicholas Meyer has cited the film as an inspiration for Star Trek II: The Wrath of Khan.
- The Voyage to the Bottom of the Sea episode "Killers of the Deep" reused substantial amounts of footage from the film. David Hedison (then Al Hedison), who played Lieutenant Ware, the executive officer of the Haynes, also played Commander Lee Crane on Voyage to the Bottom of the Sea.
- In the 1995 film Crimson Tide, two USS Alabama officers debate about the cast of The Enemy Below.

== See also ==
- List of American films of 1957
- USS Borie (DD-215)—The real U-boat/destroyer story
