= SS Amelia Earhart =

World War II Liberty ship of the United States

History

United States
- Name: Amelia Earhart
- Namesake: Amelia Earhart
- Builder: Todd Houston Shipbuilding Corporation, Houston, Texas
- Laid down: 19 October 1942
- Launched: 18 December 1942
- Fate: Wrecked, 1948

General characteristics
- Type: Liberty ship
- Tonnage: 7,000 long tons deadweight (DWT)
- Length: 441 ft 6 in (134.57 m)
- Beam: 56 ft 10.75 in (17.3419 m)
- Draft: 27 ft 9.25 in (8.4646 m)
- Propulsion: 2 × oil-fired boilers; Triple expansion steam engine, 2,500 hp (1,864 kW); single screw
- Speed: 11.5 knots (21.3 km/h; 13.2 mph)
- Capacity: 9,140 tons cargo
- Complement: 41
- Armament: 1 × 4 in (100 mm) deck gun; Variety of anti-aircraft guns

SS Amelia Earhart (Hull Number 117) was a Liberty ship built in the United States during World War II. She was named after Amelia Earhart, an American female aviator who disappeared over the Pacific Ocean in 1937.

The ship was laid down on 19 October 1942, and was launched just 60 days later on 18 December 1942. She was operated by the Merchants & Miners Transportation Company. The ship took part in convoy HX 300, the largest convoy of the World War II and survived the war. In 1948, it was wrecked and declared a total loss.

== See also ==
- List of Liberty ships: A-F
