= HMCS Dunver =

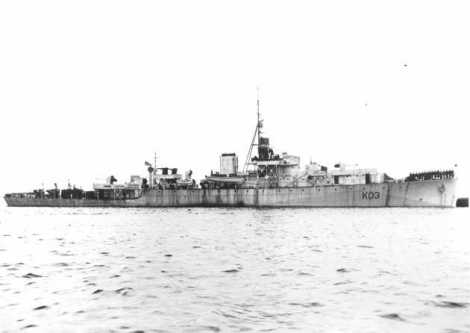
- HMCS Dunver

History

Canada
- Name: Dunver
- Namesake: Verdun, Quebec
- Operator: Royal Canadian Navy
- Ordered: October 1941
- Builder: Morton Engineering & Dry Dock Co., Quebec City
- Laid down: 5 May 1942
- Launched: 10 November 1942
- Commissioned: 11 September 1943
- Decommissioned: 23 January 1946
- Identification: pennant number: K 03
- Honours and awards: Atlantic 1943-45
- Fate: Sunk as breakwater 1948

General characteristics
- Class & type: River-class frigate
- Displacement: 1,445 long tons (1,468 t; 1,618 short tons); 2,110 long tons (2,140 t; 2,360 short tons) (deep load)
- Length: 283 ft (86.26 m) p/p; 301.25 ft (91.82 m)o/a
- Beam: 36.5 ft (11.13 m)
- Draught: 9 ft (2.74 m); 13 ft (3.96 m) (deep load)
- Propulsion: 2 x Admiralty 3-drum boilers, 2 shafts, reciprocating vertical triple expansion, 5,500 ihp (4,100 kW)
- Speed: 20 knots (37.0 km/h); 20.5 knots (38.0 km/h) (turbine ships)
- Range: 646 long tons (656 t; 724 short tons) oil fuel; 7,500 nautical miles (13,890 km) at 15 knots (27.8 km/h)
- Complement: 157
- Armament: 2 × QF 4 in (102 mm) /45 Mk. XVI on twin mount HA/LA Mk.XIX; 1 × QF 12 pdr (3 in (76 mm)) 12 cwt /40 Mk. V on mounting HA/LA Mk.IX (not all ships); 8 × 20 mm QF Oerlikon A/A on twin mounts Mk.V; 1 × Hedgehog 24 spigot A/S projector; up to 150 depth charges

HMCS Dunver was a River-class frigate that served with the Royal Canadian Navy during the Second World War. She served primarily as a convoy escort in the Battle of the Atlantic. She was named for Verdun, Quebec. Her name was altered to prevent confusion with other Allied warships named Verdun.

Dunver was ordered as Verdun (Note: Referred to as Verdun of Canada in some sources.) in October 1941 as part of the 1942–1943 River-class building program. She was laid down on 5 May 1942 by Morton Engineering & Dry Dock Co. at Quebec City and launched 10 November later that year. At some point during 1942, her name was changed to Dunver. She was commissioned into the Royal Canadian Navy on 11 December 1943 at Quebec City.

== Background ==
The River-class frigate was designed by William Reed of Smith's Dock Company of South Bank-on-Tees. Originally called a "twin-screw corvette", its purpose was to improve on the convoy escort classes in service with the Royal Navy at the time, including the Flower-class corvette. The first orders were placed by the Royal Navy in 1940 and the vessels were named for rivers in the United Kingdom, giving name to the class. In Canada they were named for towns and cities though they kept the same designation. The name "frigate" was suggested by Vice-Admiral Percy Nelles of the Royal Canadian Navy and was adopted later that year.

Improvements over the corvette design included improved accommodation which was markedly better. The twin engines gave only three more knots of speed but extended the range of the ship to nearly double that of a corvette at 7,200 nautical miles (13,300 km) at 12 knots. Among other lessons applied to the design was an armament package better designed to combat U-boats including a twin 4-inch mount forward and 12-pounder aft. 15 Canadian frigates were initially fitted with a single 4-inch gun forward but with the exception of HMCS Valleyfield, they were all eventually upgraded to the double mount. For underwater targets, the River-class frigate was equipped with a Hedgehog anti-submarine mortar and depth charge rails aft and four side-mounted throwers.

River-class frigates were the first Royal Canadian Navy warships to carry the 147B Sword horizontal fan echo sonar transmitter in addition to the irregular ASDIC. This allowed the ship to maintain contact with targets even while firing unless a target was struck. Improved radar and direction-finding equipment improved the RCN's ability to find and track enemy submarines over the previous classes.

Canada originally ordered the construction of 33 frigates in October 1941. The design was too big for the shipyards on the Great Lakes so all the frigates built in Canada were built in dockyards along the west coast or along the St. Lawrence River. In all Canada ordered the construction of 60 frigates including ten for the Royal Navy that transferred two to the United States Navy.

== War service ==
After commissioning, Dunver escorted a Sydney - Halifax convoy while making her way to Halifax. The vessel performed her workups at Pictou. Following that she was assigned to the Mid-Ocean Escort Force escort group C-5. In July 1944, she was the Senior Officer's Ship while escorting the largest convoy of the war, HX 300. She remained as a trans-Atlantic convoy escort until October 1944.

Following the war, HMCS Hespeler and Dunver were credited with sinking U-484. That has since been credited to other ships by some sources while other sources continue to give these ships credit.

In October 1944, Dunver returned to Canada to undergo a refit at Pictou. This was completed on 27 December 1944. After working up she joined escort group EG 27 based out of Halifax. She remained with this group until the end of hostilities in Europe. In June 1945 she was sent to the west coast to undergo a tropicalization refit for possible service in the southern Pacific Ocean. This meant adding refrigeration and water-cooling capabilities and changing the camouflage. However the refit was not completed, being cancelled in August due to the surrender of Japan.

Dunver was laid up at Esquimalt, British Columbia until being paid off 23 January 1946. She remained there until 1948 when she was sold to Wagner Stein & Greene to be stripped. The remaining hulk was then sent to Royston, British Columbia to be used as part of the breakwater.
