= HMS Launceston Castle =

Corvette in UK Royal Navy

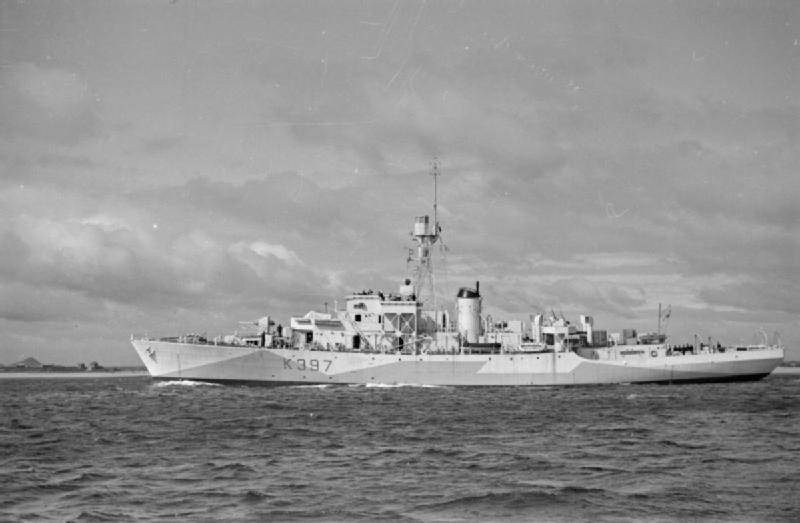

History

United Kingdom
- Name: HMS Launceston Castle
- Namesake: Launceston Castle
- Builder: Blyth Shipbuilding and Drydock Company
- Laid down: 27 May 1943
- Launched: 27 November 1943
- Commissioned: 20 June 1944
- Decommissioned: 1947
- Identification: pennant number K397
- Fate: Scrapped 3 August 1959

General characteristics
- Class & type: Castle-class corvette

HMS Launceston Castle (K397) was a Castle-class corvette of the United Kingdom's Royal Navy, named after Launceston Castle in Cornwall. The ship was constructed during the Second World War and saw service primarily as a convoy escort.

== Design ==
The Castle-class corvettes were an improved and enlarged derivative of the earlier Flower-class corvettes, which was intended to be built by shipyards that could not build the larger and more capable frigates. The greater length of the Castles gave made them better seaboats than the Flowers, which were not originally designed for ocean escort work. Large numbers (96 in total) were ordered in late 1942 and early 1943 from shipyards in the United Kingdom and Canada, but Allied successes in the Battle of the Atlantic meant that the requirement for escorts was reduced, and many ships (including all the Canadian ones) were cancelled.

The Castles were 252 feet 0 inches (76.81 m) long overall, 234 feet 0 inches (71.32 m) at the waterline and 225 feet 0 inches (68.58 m) between perpendiculars. Beam was 36 feet 6 inches (11.13 m) and draught was 13 feet 5 inches (4.09 m) aft at full load. Displacement was about 1,060 long tons (1,080 t) standard and 1,590–1,630 long tons (1,620–1,660 t) full load. Two Admiralty Three-drum water tube boilers fed steam to a vertical triple expansion engine rated at 2,750 indicated horsepower (2,050 kW) which drove a single propeller shaft. This gave a speed of 16.5 knots (30.6 km/h; 19.0 mph). 480 tons of oil were carried, giving a range of 6,200 nautical miles (11,500 km; 7,100 mi) at 15 knots (28 km/h; 17 mph).

The ships had a main gun armament of a single QF 4-inch Mk XIX dual-purpose gun, backed up by two twin and two single Oerlikon 20 mm cannon. Anti-submarine armament consisted of a single triple-barrelled Squid anti-submarine mortar with 81 depth charges backed up by two depth charge throwers and a single depth charge rail, with 15 depth charges carried. Type 272 or Type 277 surface search radar was fitted, as was high-frequency direction finding (HF/DF) gear. The ships' sonar outfit was Type 145 and Type 147B.

The small size and slow speed of the Castles meant that they were considered obsolete post-war, and they underwent limited modifications, with armament changes limited to replacing the twin 20mm mounts with single 40 mm Bofors mounts. Launceston Castle had been modified to this standard by 1953.

== Service history ==
Launceston Castle was ordered on 19 January 1943, one of 14 Castle-class corvettes ordered that day (of which three were cancelled and two completed as rescue ships). The ship was laid down at Blyth Shipbuilding's Blyth, Northumberland shipyard as Yard number 295 on 27 May 1943, with the ship's machinery being built by White's Marine Engineering Company at Hebburn. Launceston Castle was launched on 27 November 1943 and completed on 20 June 1944, and was allocated the Pennant number K397. She was the first Royal Navy ship to be called Launceston Castle.

In the Second World War she carried out convoy escort duties and anti-submarine patrols in the Western Approaches, the English Channel and the North Sea. After commissioning, Launceston Castle joined Escort Group B4. In August 1944, Escort Group B4 was redesignated as the 30th Escort Group commanded by Denys Rayner, who carried his flag on board HMS Pevensey Castle. On 11 November 1944, Launceston Castle, along with sister ships of the 30th Escort Group, Pevensey Castle, Kenilworth Castle and Portchester Castle, carried out a series of attacks against a sonar target with Squid and depth charges off the south of Ireland, bringing up oil and a large air bubble, and were credited with sinking the submarine, which was later identified as the German submarine U-1200. In 1999, however, the wreck of U-1200 was found south-east of Start Point, Devon, with the cause of the submarine's loss uncertain. The 30th Escort Group is now believed to have attacked a non-submarine target. On 15 November and 26–29 December, 30 Escort Group, including Launceston Castle made more attacks against suspected submarine targets.

Launceston Castle continued to serve with the 30th Escort Group for the rest of the war in Europe, but in July–October 1945, was employed on air-sea rescue duties operating out of Freetown, patrolling on the expected routes of flights repatriating American troops. In 1947, the ship went into reserve at Devonport. In 1948, the Castle-class were redesignated from 'Corvettes' to 'Frigates (2nd Rate)', and so Launceston Castle's pennant number changed from K397 to F397. The frigate was refitted at Bristol in 1949.

In October 1951, after a refit at Falmouth, Cornwall, Launceston Castle joined the 2nd Training Squadron, serving as an Air Training Target Ship, working with helicopters carrying out air-sea rescue training, cooperating with anti submarine aircraft and acting as a target for submarines. In 1953 she took part in the Fleet Review to celebrate the Coronation of Queen Elizabeth II. After two Avro Shackleton maritime patrol aircraft of the RAF went missing on 11 January off Fastnet Rock in the Atlantic Ocean, Launceston Castle took part in search operations for the missing aircraft, while on 24 January that year she took part in search operations after a Fleet Air Arm Fairey Firefly ditched off Lands End. In November 1956, Launceston Castle returned to reserve at Devonport. On the night on 5/6 February 1957, Launceston Castle went to the assistance of the merchant ship Holdernore, which was adrift between Skerryvore and Tiree in the Inner Hebrides off the west coast of Scotland in gale force winds, escorting Holdernore to safety in Tobermory Bay.

In 1959, Launceston Castle was sold for scrap, arriving at J. A. White's yard at St Davids on Forth for breaking up on 3 August 1959.

== Bibliography ==
- Blackman, Raymond V. B., ed. (1953). Jane's Fighting Ships 1953–54. New York: McGraw-Hill. OCLC 913556389.
- Brown, David K. (2007). Atlantic Escorts: Ships, Weapons & Tactics in World War II. Barnsley: Seaforth Publishing. ISBN 978-1-84415-702-0.
- Brown, David K. (2012). Nelson to Vanguard: Warship Design and Development 1923–1945. Barnsley: Seaforth. ISBN 978-1-84832-149-6..
- Colledge, J. J.; Warlow, Ben (2006) [1969]. Ships of the Royal Navy: The Complete Record of All Fighting Ships of the Royal Navy from the 15th Century to the Present (3rd Rev ed.). London: Chatham Publishing. ISBN 978-1-86176-281-8. OCLC 67375475.
- Critchley, Mike (1992). British Warships Since 1945: Part 5: Frigates. Liskeard: Maritime Press. ISBN 0-907771-13-0.
- Elliott, Peter (1977). Allied Escort Ships of World War II: A Complete Survey. London: Macdonald and Jane's. ISBN 0-356-08401-9.
- Friedman, Norman (2008). British Destroyers & Frigates: The Second World War and After. Barnsley: Seaforth Publishing. ISBN 978-1-84832-015-4.
- Gardiner, Robert; Chesneau, Roger, eds. (1980). Conway's All The World's Fighting Ships 1922–1946. London: Conway Maritime Press. ISBN 0-85177-146-7.
- Goodwin, Norman (2007). Castle Class Corvettes: An Account of the Service of the Ships and of their Ships' Companies. Liskeard, UK: Maritime Books. ISBN 978-1-904459-279.
- Marriott, Leo (1983). Royal Navy Frigates 1945–1983. London: Ian Allan. ISBN 0-7110-1322-5.
- Niestlé, Axel (2014). German U-Boat Losses During World War II: Details of Destruction. Barnsley: Frontline Books. ISBN 978-1-84832-210-3.
- Rayner, D. A. (1955). Escort: The Battle of the Atlantic (2nd ed.). London: William Kimber. OCLC 7935221.
- Rohwer, Jürgen; Hümmelchen, Gerhard (1992). Chronology of the War at Sea 1939–1945. London: Greenhill Books. ISBN 1-85367-117-7.
