= HMCS Hespeler =

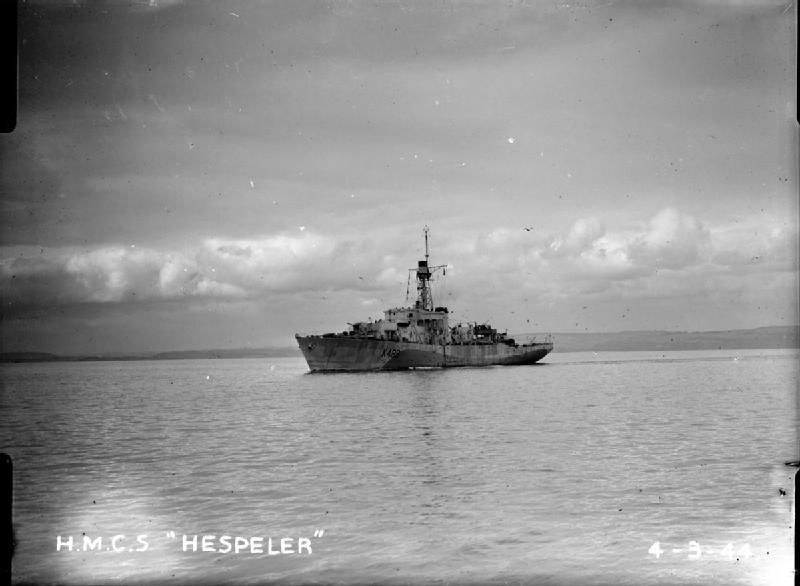
- As HMCS Hespeler during the Second World War

History

United Kingdom
- Name: Guildford Castle
- Namesake: Guildford Castle
- Ordered: 19 January 1943
- Builder: Henry Robb Ltd, Leith
- Laid down: 25 May 1943
- Launched: 13 November 1943
- Identification: Pennant number: K378
- Fate: Transferred to the Royal Canadian Navy

Canada
- Name: Hespeler
- Namesake: Hespeler, Ontario
- Acquired: 1943
- Commissioned: 28 February 1944
- Decommissioned: 15 November 1945
- Identification: Pennant number: K489
- Honours and awards: Atlantic 1944–45
- Fate: Sold for mercantile service 1946
- Name: Chilcotin (1946); Capri (1958); Stella Maris (1960); Westar (1965)
- Port of registry: Canada (1946–58); Liberia (1958–60); Panama (1960–65); Liberia (1965–66)
- In service: 1946
- Out of service: 28 January 1966
- Fate: Destroyed by fire 1966

General characteristics (as built)
- Type: Castle-class corvette
- Displacement: 1,060 long tons (1,077 t)
- Length: 252 ft (77 m)
- Beam: 36 ft 8 in (11.18 m)
- Draught: 13 ft 6 in (4.11 m)
- Installed power: 2 × water-tube boilers; 2,750 ihp (2,050 kW)
- Propulsion: 1 × 4-cylinder triple-expansion steam engine; Single screw
- Speed: 16.5 knots (30.6 km/h; 19.0 mph)
- Range: 6,200 nmi (11,500 km) at 15 kn (28 km/h; 17 mph)
- Complement: 120
- Sensors & processing systems: Type 272 radar; Type 145 sonar; Type 147B sonar
- Armament: 1 × QF 4-inch Mk XIX gun; 1 × Squid anti-submarine mortar; 1 × Depth charge rail, 15 depth charges; 4–10 × 20 mm anti-aircraft cannon

HMCS Hespeler was a Castle-class corvette of the Royal Canadian Navy which served during the Second World War as a convoy escort that was originally ordered as HMS Guildford Castle for the British Royal Navy but before completion was transferred and renamed. Following the war, the ship was sold for mercantile use, renamed Chilcotin in 1946, Capri in 1958, Stella Maris in 1960, and Westar in 1965. The ship was destroyed by fire in 1966 while at Sarroch, Sardinia. The hulk was taken to La Spezia, Italy where Westar was broken up.

== Design and description ==
The Castle class were an improved corvette design over their predecessor Flower class. The Flower class was not considered acceptable for mid-Atlantic sailing and was only used on Atlantic convoy duty out of need. Though the Admiralty would have preferred Loch-class frigates, the inability of many small shipyards to construct the larger ships required them to come up with a smaller vessel. The increased length of the Castle class over their predecessors and their improved hull form gave the Castles better speed and performance on patrol in the North Atlantic and an acceptable replacement for the Flowers. This, coupled with improved anti-submarine armament in the form of the Squid mortar led to a much more capable anti-submarine warfare (ASW) vessel. However, the design did have criticisms, mainly in the way it handled at low speeds and that the class's maximum speed was already slower than the speeds of the new U-boats they would be facing.

A Castle-class corvette was 252 feet (77 m) long with a beam of 36 feet 8 inches (11.18 m) and a draught of 13 feet 6 inches (4.11 m) at deep load. (Note: Brown states the beam at 36.5 feet (11.1 m) and the draught at 13.5 feet (4.1 m)) The ships displaced 1,060 long tons (1,077 t) standard and 1,580 long tons (1,605 t) deep load. (Note: Chesneau states the displacement at deep load as 1,590–1,630 long tons (1,616–1,656 t)) The ships had a complement of 120. (Note: Brown states the complement as 99 and Johnston states the complement of Canadian ships at 112 (7 officers and 105 ratings).)

The ships were powered by two Admiralty three-drum boilers which created 2,750 indicated horsepower (2,050 kW). This powered one vertical triple expansion engine that drove one shaft, giving the ships a maximum speed of 16.5 knots (30.6 km/h; 19.0 mph). The ships carried 480 tons of oil giving them a range of 6,200 nautical miles (11,500 km; 7,100 mi) at 15 knots (28 km/h; 17 mph).

The corvettes were armed with one QF 4-inch Mk XIX gun mounted forward. (Note: Mk XIX = Mark 19. Britain used Roman numerals to denote Marks (models) of ordnance until after World War II. This was the nineteenth model of British QF 4-inch gun) Anti-air armament varied from 4 to 10 Oerlikon 20 mm cannons. For ASW purposes, the ships were equipped with one three-barreled Squid anti-submarine mortar with 81 projectiles. The ships also had two depth charge throwers and one depth charge rail on the stern that came with 15 depth charges.

The ships were equipped with Type 145 and Type 147B ASDIC. The Type 147B was tied to the Squid anti-submarine mortar and would automatically set the depth on the fuses of the projectiles until the moment of firing. A single Squid-launched attack had a success rate of 25%. The class was also provided with HF/DF and Type 277 radar.

== Construction and career ==
Guildford Castle, named for Guildford Castle in Surrey, was ordered on 19 January 1943. The ship was laid down on 25 May 1943 at Henry Robb Ltd in Leith and launched on 13 November 1943. At some point during 1943, the ship was transferred to the Royal Canadian Navy. The corvette was commissioned into the Royal Canadian Navy on 28 February 1944 as Hespeler with the pennant number K489. The ship was named for Hespeler, Ontario, a community in southern Ontario.

Following her commissioning, Hespeler worked up at Tobermory. The ship was then assigned to the Mid-Ocean Escort Force as a member of the convoy escort group C-5. From April 1944 until the end of the war, Hespeler performed convoy escort duties, taking part in the largest convoy of the war, HX 300.

On 9 September 1944, while on patrol south of the Hebrides, Hespeler, in conjunction with the River-class frigate Dunver attacked and sank the German submarine U-484. Spotted by a Short Sunderland from 423 Squadron of the Royal Canadian Air Force which attacked the submarine using depth charges, the aircraft then directed three ships to U-484. Hespeler attacked the submarine using her Squid anti-submarine mortar, and after the explosions spotted large air bubbles coming to the surface. The credit for the kill has been disputed by other sources, claiming that the attack was directed at non-submarine targets.

In March 1945, Hespeler returned to Canada and began a refit upon arrival at Halifax. The refit was completed in July at Liverpool, Nova Scotia and following it, the corvette sailed for Esquimalt, British Columbia. Following her arrival, Hespeler was paid off into the reserve on 15 November.

=== Mercantile service ===
In 1946, Hespeler was sold for mercantile use to Union Steamships Ltd. of Vancouver. Converted into the passenger ship Chilcotin, Union Steamships paid $25,000 to purchase the vessel, and another $400,000 to convert ex-Hespeler into the passenger ship. The converted ship had a gross register tonnage of 1,837 tons. Chilcotin sailed between Alaska and Vancouver until 1957 when Chilcotin was sold to Sunline Inc. She underwent a refit in 1957 and began service as Capri in 1958 operating under a Liberian flag. In 1960, her flag was transferred to Panama and the ship was renamed Stella Maris. (Note: Miramar claims that Capri was renamed Stella Maris in 1958 and that the port of registry was changed to Panama at the same time.) Stella Maris was used to give round-trip cruises on the Saint Lawrence Seaway, starting from Montreal.

In 1965, her flag returned to Liberia and the ship was renamed Westar. While en route from Greece to Vancouver, on 28 January 1966 the ship was refueling at Sarroch, Sardinia when a fire broke out in her engine room. The ship was beached and one Canadian and one British sailor were killed and three others injured. Westar was taken to La Spezia, Italy to be scrapped on 30 April 1966.

== Notes ==
=== References ===
- Brown, David K. (2007). Atlantic Escorts Ships: Ships, Weapons & Tactics in World War II. Barnsley, UK: Seaforth Publishing. ISBN 978-1-84415-702-0.
- Brown, David K. (2012). Nelson to Vanguard: Warship Design and Development 1923–1945. Barnsley, UK: Seaforth Publishing. ISBN 978-1-84832-149-6.
- Chesneau, Roger, ed. (1980). Conway's All the World's Fighting Ships 1922–1946. Greenwich, UK: Conway Maritime Press. ISBN 0-85177-146-7.
- Colledge, J. J.; Warlow, Ben (2006) [1969]. Ships of the Royal Navy: The Complete Record of All Fighting Ships of the Royal Navy from the 15th Century to the Present (3rd Rev ed.). London: Chatham Publishing. ISBN 978-1-86176-281-8. OCLC 67375475.
- Goodwin, Norman (2007). Castle Class Corvettes: An Account of the Service of the Ships and of Their Ships' Companies. Liskeard, UK: Maritime Books. ISBN 978-1-904459-27-9.
- Johnston, Mac (2008). Corvettes Canada: Convoy Veterans of World War II Tell Their True Stories. Mississauga, Ontario: John Wiley & Sons Canada Ltd. ISBN 978-0-470-15429-8.
- Lenton, H. T. (1998). British & Empire Warships of the Second World War. Annapolis, Maryland: Naval Institute Press. ISBN 1-55750-048-7.
- Macpherson, Ken; Barrie, Ron (2002). The Ships of Canada's Naval Forces 1910–2002 (Third ed.). St. Catharines, Ontario: Vanwell Publishing. ISBN 1-55125-072-1.
- Niestlé, Alex (2014). German U-boat Losses During World War II: Details of Destruction. Barnsley, UK: Frontline Books. ISBN 978-1-84832-210-3.
- Paterson, Lawrence (2008). Dönitz's Last Gamble: The Inshore U-boat Campaign 1944–45. Barnsley, UK: Seaforth Publishing. ISBN 978-1-84415-714-3.
- Rohwer, Jürgen (2005). Chronology of the War at Sea 1939–1945: The Naval History of World War Two (Third Revised ed.). Annapolis, Maryland: Naval Institute Press. ISBN 1-59114-119-2.
