= German submarine U-1200 =

German World War II submarine

History

Nazi Germany
- Name: U-1200
- Ordered: 14 October 1941
- Builder: Schichau-Werke, Danzig
- Yard number: 1570
- Laid down: 17 April 1943
- Launched: 4 November 1943
- Commissioned: 5 January 1944
- Fate: Sunk on or about 12 November 1944

General characteristics
- Class & type: Type VIIC submarine
- Displacement: 769 tonnes (757 long tons) surfaced; 871 t (857 long tons) submerged
- Length: 67.10 m (220 ft 2 in) o/a; 50.50 m (165 ft 8 in) pressure hull
- Beam: 6.20 m (20 ft 4 in) o/a; 4.70 m (15 ft 5 in) pressure hull
- Height: 9.60 m (31 ft 6 in)
- Draught: 4.74 m (15 ft 7 in)
- Installed power: 2,800–3,200 PS (2,100–2,400 kW; 2,800–3,200 bhp) (diesels); 750 PS (550 kW; 740 shp) (electric)
- Propulsion: 2 shafts; 2 × diesel engines; 2 × electric motors
- Speed: 17.7 knots (32.8 km/h; 20.4 mph) surfaced; 7.6 knots (14.1 km/h; 8.7 mph) submerged
- Range: 8,500 nmi (15,700 km; 9,800 mi) at 10 knots (19 km/h; 12 mph) surfaced; 80 nmi (150 km; 92 mi) at 4 knots (7.4 km/h; 4.6 mph) submerged
- Test depth: 230 m (750 ft); Crush depth: 250–295 m (820–968 ft)
- Complement: 4 officers, 40–56 enlisted
- Armament: 5 × 53.3 cm (21 in) torpedo tubes (4 bow, 1 stern); 14 × torpedoes or 26 TMA mines; 1 × 8.8 cm (3.46 in) deck gun (220 rounds); 1 × 3.7 cm (1.5 in) Flak M42 AA gun; 2 × twin 2 cm (0.79 in) C/30 anti-aircraft guns

Service record
- Part of: 8th U-boat Flotilla; 5 January – 31 August 1944; 11th U-boat Flotilla; 1 September – 12 November 1944
- Identification codes: M 42 508
- Commanders: Oblt.z.S. Hinrich Mangels; 5 January – 12 November 1944
- Operations: 1 patrol: 19 October – 12 November 1944
- Victories: None

German submarine U-1200 was a Type VIIC U-boat of Nazi Germany's Kriegsmarine which saw service during the Second World War.

== Design ==
German Type VIIC submarines were preceded by the shorter Type VIIB submarines. U-1200 had a displacement of 769 tonnes (757 long tons) when at the surface and 871 tonnes (857 long tons) while submerged. She had a total length of 67.10 m (220 ft 2 in), a pressure hull length of 50.50 m (165 ft 8 in), a beam of 6.20 m (20 ft 4 in), a height of 9.60 m (31 ft 6 in), and a draught of 4.74 m (15 ft 7 in). The submarine was powered by two Germaniawerft F46 four-stroke, six-cylinder supercharged diesel engines producing a total of 2,800 to 3,200 metric horsepower (2,060 to 2,350 kW; 2,760 to 3,160 shp) for use while surfaced, two AEG GU 460/8–27 double-acting electric motors producing a total of 750 metric horsepower (550 kW; 740 shp) for use while submerged. She had two shafts and two 1.23 m (4 ft) propellers. The boat was capable of operating at depths of up to 230 metres (750 ft).

The submarine had a maximum surface speed of 17.7 knots (32.8 km/h; 20.4 mph) and a maximum submerged speed of 7.6 knots (14.1 km/h; 8.7 mph). When submerged, the boat could operate for 80 nautical miles (150 km; 92 mi) at 4 knots (7.4 km/h; 4.6 mph); when surfaced, she could travel 8,500 nautical miles (15,700 km; 9,800 mi) at 10 knots (19 km/h; 12 mph). U-1200 was fitted with five 53.3 cm (21 in) torpedo tubes (four fitted at the bow and one at the stern), fourteen torpedoes, one 8.8 cm (3.46 in) SK C/35 naval gun, (220 rounds), one 3.7 cm (1.5 in) Flak M42 and two twin 2 cm (0.79 in) C/30 anti-aircraft guns. The boat had a complement of between forty-four and sixty.

== Service history ==
U-1200 keel was laid down 17 April 1943, by F. Schichau, of Danzig. She was commissioned 5 January 1944 under the command of Oberleutnant zur See Hinrich Mangels.

She was assigned to 8th U-boat Flotilla for training, before joining 11th U-boat Flotilla in Norway for operational service.

Her first war patrol, on 7 October 1944, was cut short with mechanical difficulties; she returned to Bergen on 17 October. Two days later on 19 October she set out again for her patrol area in the South-Western Approaches, south of Ireland.

== Fate ==
U-1200 was sunk on or about 12 November 1944 in the English Channel south-east of Start Point by unknown cause. All hands lost.

=== Previously recorded fate ===
On the night of 10 November 1944, 60 miles (97 km) south of Cape Clear, Ireland, she encountered units of the Royal Navy's 30 Escort Group. These were four Castle-class corvettes, HMS Pevensey Castle, HMS Kenilworth Castle, HMS Launceston Castle and HMS Portchester Castle, led by Cdr. Denys Rayner. Mistaking the group, which was engaged in a slow sweep of its patrol area, for a small convoy, U-1200 attempted to stalk the group, steering on a converging course. In a swift and well-executed attack, the ships of 30 EG rounded on the U-boat and destroyed her in one depth-charge attack. There were no survivors.

== Bibliography ==
- Busch, Rainer; Röll, Hans-Joachim (1999). German U-boat commanders of World War II : a biographical dictionary. Translated by Brooks, Geoffrey. London, Annapolis, Md: Greenhill Books, Naval Institute Press. ISBN 1-55750-186-6.
- Busch, Rainer; Röll, Hans-Joachim (1999). Deutsche U-Boot-Verluste von September 1939 bis Mai 1945 [German U-boat losses from September 1939 to May 1945]. Der U-Boot-Krieg (in German). Vol. IV. Hamburg, Berlin, Bonn: Mittler. ISBN 3-8132-0514-2.
- Gröner, Erich; Jung, Dieter; Maass, Martin (1991). German Warships 1815–1945, U-boats and Mine Warfare Vessels. Vol. 2. Translated by Thomas, Keith; Magowan, Rachel. London: Conway Maritime Press. ISBN 0-85177-593-4.
- Kemp, Paul (1999). U-Boats Destroyed - German Submarine Losses in the World Wars. London: Arms & Armour. ISBN 1-85409-515-3.
- Niestle, Axel (1998). German U-Boat Losses During World War II. Greenhill. ISBN 1-85367-352-8.
- Denys Rayner: Escort:The Battle of the Atlantic (1955; reprint 1999) ISBN 1-55750-696-5
