= The Enemy Below (novel) =

1956 novel by Denys Rayner

- Author: Denys Rayner
- Language: English
- Publisher: HarperCollins
- Publication date: 1956
- Publication place: United Kingdom
- Media type: Print (hardback & paperback)
- Pages: 192
- ISBN: 9780006163800

The Enemy Below is a 1956 novel written by Denys Rayner. It was based on the author’s experiences during the Battle of the Atlantic in World War II.

A 1957 film starring Robert Mitchum and Curd Jürgens was based on the novel, but with major changes to characters and action, including making the destroyer an American ship.

== Plot ==
The story covers four days in September 1943.

His Majesty’s Destroyer Hecate is on independent patrol in the South Atlantic, when they detect by radar a distant object. Coming closer, it proves to be a German U-boat running on the surface. U-121 is in fact on its way to rendezvous with a German merchant raider in the South Atlantic Ocean, where they are to collect vital documents concerning British cyphers. The submarine does not detect the approach of the ship for some time, believing the radar contact to be a ‘ghost echo’. When the contact is eventually identified and reported to the commander, Peter von Stolberg, he is furious with the watch officers for the delay. He immediately orders the U-boat to dive.

John Murrell, captain of the Hecate, proves himself a match for the wily U-boat Kapitän von Stolberg, a man from an aristocratic background who is not enamoured with the Nazi regime. A prolonged and deadly battle of wits ensues that tests both men and their crews. Each man grows to respect his unseen opponent.

Murrell stalks the U-boat and subjects von Stolberg and his crew to multiple depth charge attacks. Von Stolberg unsuccessfully tries to torpedo the destroyer.

The submarine, badly damaged and critically short of air and battery power, is forced to the surface, and a gun battle takes place. The destroyer also is badly damaged; she loses steam and therefore all power. Many sailors are killed or wounded. But they manage to send off a radio message on an emergency short-range transmitter.

Eventually, both commanders order to abandon ship, and the survivors pile into lifeboats.

Murrell and von Stolberg find themselves in the same lifeboat. Murrell assumes that von Stolberg will now formally surrender, but in fact, the latter demands that Murrell surrenders, believing that the German ship they are to rendezvous with is very close. The two commanders, now angry, engage in fisticuffs. von Stolberg is nearly knocked into the sea by a punch from Murrell and the latter is struck with a wooden oar by an enraged young German sailor.

HMS Marabout arrives to take off the survivors. Her captain cheerfully reports that her two companion ships are busily engaged in sinking the German raider.

== Background ==
The novel is divided into five major sections, which reflect the nature of the conflict between the U-boat and the destroyer: "Radar Sparring", "ASDIC Duel", "Gun Battle", "Cold Steel", and "Fisticuffs".

In an introductory note, the author points out that the story is fictional; as far as he is aware, no British destroyer ever fought a single-ship action against a U-boat. He further explains that, in such an action, the odds are rather more in favour of the submarine, which has more chances of sinking her adversary by torpedo and deck gun, whilst presenting a smaller target for the destroyer. He further explains that an early attempt by the ship to ram the submarine was not carried out, due to the thin metal used to plate the ship; this would have caused major damage to the latter and little damage to the U-boat.
