= Westerly 22 =

1960s British recreational keelboat

Development
- Designer: Denis Rayner
- Location: United Kingdom
- Year: 1963
- No. built: 332
- Builder: Denys Rayner
- Role: Cruiser
- Name: Westerly 22

Boat
- Displacement: 3,150 lb (1,429 kg)
- Draft: 2.25 ft (0.69 m)

Hull
- Type: monohull
- Construction: FRP
- LOA: 22.25 ft (6.78 m)
- LWL: 18.33 ft (5.59 m)
- Beam: 7.50 ft (2.29 m)
- Engine: inboard diesel engine/outboard motor

Hull appendages
- Keel: twin keels
- Ballast: 1,050 lb (476 kg)
- Rudder: skeg-mounted rudder

Rig
- Rig type: Gunter rig

Sails
- Sailplan: Gunter rigged sloop
- Total sail area: 227.00 sq ft (21.089 m^{2})

The Westerly 22 is a British sailboat that was designed by Denys Rayner as a cruiser and first built in 1963.

The design was derived from the wooden West Coaster 20 and later developed into the Nomad 22 in 1967.

== Production ==
The design was built by Westerly Marine Construction in the United Kingdom, between 1963 and 1967, with 332 boats completed.

== Design ==
The Westerly 22 is a recreational keelboat, built predominantly of glassfibre, with wood trim. It has a Gunter rig or an optional masthead sloop rig, a spooned raked stem, an angled transom, a skeg-mounted rudder controlled by a tiller and a twin fixed keels. It displaces 3,150 lb (1,429 kg) and carries 1,050 lb (476 kg) of ballast.

The boat has a draft of 2.25 ft (0.69 m) with the standard twin keels.

The boat is normally fitted with a small outboard motor for docking and manoeuvring, although a Volvo Penta M1 inboard diesel was a factory option. The fuel tank holds 22 U.S. gallons (83 L; 18 imp gal) and the fresh water tank also has a capacity of 22 U.S. gallons (83 L; 18 imp gal).

The design has sleeping accommodation for four people, with a double "V"-berth in the bow cabin and two straight settee berths in the main cabin. The galley is located on both sides of the cabin, amidships. The galley is equipped with a two-burner stove and grill to port and a sink to starboard. A navigation station is located on the port side above the stove. The head is located centred in the bow cabin, under the "V"-berth.

The design has a hull speed of 5.74 kn (10.63 km/h).

== Operational history ==
The boat is supported by an active class club that organizes sailing events, the Westerly Owners Association.
