= HMCS The Pas =

Flower-class corvette

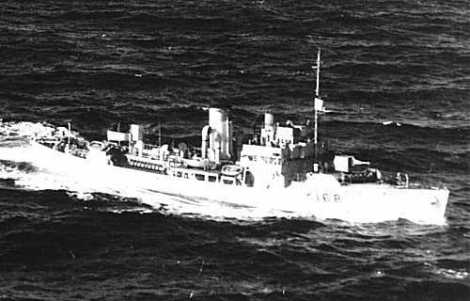
- HMCS The Pas

History

Canada
- Name: The Pas
- Namesake: The Pas, Manitoba
- Ordered: 1 February 1940
- Builder: Collingwood Shipyards Ltd., Collingwood
- Laid down: 7 January 1940
- Launched: 16 August 1940
- Commissioned: 21 October 1941
- Out of service: paid off 24 July 1945
- Identification: Pennant number: K168
- Honours and awards: Atlantic 1942–44
- Fate: Sold for scrapping 16 September 1945.

General characteristics
- Class & type: Flower-class corvette(original)
- Displacement: 950 long tons (970 t; 1,060 short tons)
- Length: 205 ft (62.48 m)
- Beam: 33 ft (10.06 m)
- Draught: 11.5 ft (3.51 m)
- Propulsion: Single shaft; 2 water tube boilers; 1 4-cyl. triple expansion steam engine, 2,750 hp (2,050 kW)
- Speed: 16 knots (29.6 km/h)
- Range: 3,450 nmi (6,390 km; 3,970 mi) at 12 kn (22 km/h; 14 mph)
- Complement: 6 officers, 79 enlisted
- Sensors & processing systems: Radar – SW1C or 2C (later); Sonar – Type 123A, later Type 127DV
- Armament: 1 × BL 4 in (102 mm) Mk.IX single gun; 2 .50 cal machine gun twin; 2 Lewis .303 cal mg twin; 2 Mk.II depth charge throwers; 2 depth charge rails with 40 depth charges.; Originally fitted with minesweeping gear, later removed.

HMCS The Pas was a Flower-class corvette that served with the Royal Canadian Navy during the Second World War. She served primarily as an ocean escort in the Battle of the Atlantic and as a training ship. She was named for The Pas, Manitoba.

== Background ==
Flower-class corvettes like The Pas serving with the Royal Canadian Navy during the Second World War were different from earlier and more traditional sail-driven corvettes. The "corvette" designation was created by the French in for classes of small warships; the Royal Navy borrowed the term for a period but discontinued its use in 1877. During the hurried preparations for war in the late 1930s, Winston Churchill reactivated the corvette class, needing a name for smaller ships used in an escort capacity, in this case based on a whaling ship design. The generic name "flower" was used to designate the class of these ships, which – in the Royal Navy – were named after flowering plants.

Corvettes commissioned by the Royal Canadian Navy during the Second World War were named after communities for the most part, to better represent the people who took part in building them. This idea was put forth by Admiral Percy W. Nelles. Sponsors were commonly associated with the community for which the ship was named. Royal Navy corvettes were designed as open sea escorts, while Canadian corvettes were developed for coastal auxiliary roles which was exemplified by their minesweeping gear. Eventually the Canadian corvettes would be modified to allow them to perform better on the open seas.

== Construction ==
The Pas was ordered 1 February 1940 as part of the 1939–1940 Flower-class building program. She was laid down 7 January 1941 by Collingwood Shipyards Ltd. at Collingwood and launched 16 August 1941. She was commissioned into the RCN 21 October 1941 at Montreal, Quebec.

During her career The Pas had three significant refits. This took place at Liverpool, Nova Scotia beginning 27 November 1942 and lasted two months. The second took place in the summer of 1943 after she collided with a merchant ship. The repairs were completed in Halifax and Shelburne taking until October of that year. The third overhaul began in September 1944 and took until November. It was completed at Sydney, Nova Scotia. She was one of the few Flower-class corvettes not to have her fo'c'sle extended.

== Service history ==
After arriving at Halifax for deployment, The Pas was initially assigned to Halifax Force as a local escort. In March 1942 she joined the Western Local Escort Force (WLEF). She remained with them until June when she was reassigned to the Halifax Tanker Escort Force, a unit that escorted oil tankers along the North American coast after the U-boat threat expanded there. In September 1942 she was placed under United States command as an escort for convoys between New York and Guantanamo.

After working up following her refit, The Pas returned to WLEF and in June 1943 was assigned to escort group W-4. She was badly damaged in a collision with SS Medina, a merchant ship, in the western Atlantic on 21 July 1943. She did not return to service until the end of 1943. Upon her return she was assigned to WLEF again. In April 1944 she became a member of escort group W-3. She remained a member of that group until September 1944.

In September 1944, The Pas departed for the shipyard, returning in November 1944. After workups she joined HMCS Cornwallis as a training ship in Halifax. She remained in this capacity until the end of the war.

The Pas was paid off 24 July 1945 at Sorel, Quebec. The ship was sold for scrap on 16 September 1945 and broken up at Hamilton, Ontario in 1946.
