= Denys Rayner =

British naval officer and writer (1908–1967)

Denys Rayner in 1943

Denys Arthur Rayner DSC & Bar, VRD, RNVR (9 February 1908 – 4 January 1967) was a Royal Navy officer who fought throughout the Battle of the Atlantic during the World War II. Later, he became a writer, farmer, and a successful designer & builder of small sailing craft– his first being the Westcoaster; his most successful being the glass fibre gunter or Bermudian rigged twin keelboat named Westerly 22 which had been from evolved similar "small ships", through which he was able to cross oceans while respecting the expectations, in terms of comfort, safety and cost, of a burgeoning family market keen to get to sea. Also in 1960s, he had founded, Westerly Marine Construction Ltd– through his pioneering GRP designs, which he had secured the future expansion upto the late 1980s, where it became one of Britain's most successful yacht builders.

He died in 1967, due to the natural causes at the age of 58.

== Early Life ==
Denys Rayner was born in Muswell Hill in a Georgian house, on the outskirts of London, to a native British middle class family. His father Arthur Rayner, a master electrical engineer, became a commodity broker and moved with his family to West Kirby on the Wirral Peninsula, sending his son to Repton School between 1921 and 1924, while his mother Francis Rayner (née Parker) was a traditional housewife. Flat feet kept Denys from entering the Royal Navy but not from pursuing a successful naval career. In October 1925, he joined HMS Eaglet, Mersey Division of the Royal Naval Volunteer Reserve (RNVR) as a part-time midshipman with time to pursue his interest in exploring the rocky coast of the Western Highlands in a small boat of his own design.

As an eight-year-old prep school boy, at the height of the First World War, Rayner was disappointed to be beaten for drawing an "infernal" U-boat sinking device in a school geometry book. "Diagrammatically portrayed, this spoiled the page – I can see that now", wrote the adult Rayner in the preface of his book Escort: The Battle of the Atlantic (1955). At school Rayner, impressed that an uncle by marriage was an officer on "a real destroyer", sketched a "continuous border of destroyers" in the margins of his school books. In later school years came "an endless stream of model destroyers...which really floated and were fitted with systems of propulsion..."

== World War II ==
"I had already packed my bags, set my affairs in order and seen to the laying up of my yacht" wrote Rayner of his actions four days before the outbreak of World War II. By 1939, partly as a result of a recognition by others of his gift for leadership and partly by insisting on specialising in navigation rather than gunnery, against standard advice to RNVR officers wishing advancement in the Royal Navy, Rayner qualified himself to command 14th Anti-Submarine Group comprising HMTs Loch Tulla, Istria, Regal, Brontes and Davey, a unit of armed trawlers patrolling the notoriously dangerous waters surrounding the main fleet base of Scapa Flow – a 6 by 20 mile stretch of sea between Scotland and the Orkney Islands where a high spring tide can flow 8 knots against a westerly gale. His 'flag' was aboard HMT Loch Tulla for whom Rayner selected skipper Lang – a Devon trawlerman he describes as knowing things "about the way of a ship which no one not trained in sail could have understood".

In September 1940 Rayner, was appointed to command a corvette, HMS Violet, but finding her incomplete, and another, HMS Verbena, ready but without a commander, used all his skills of persuasion to get the command himself. Verbena, was the first long fo'c'sle Flower-class corvette and was, in Rayner's eyes, "quite perfect".

On Verbena, the nickname 'Ben', which stayed with him for the rest of his life, was used as Rayner's call sign. Verbena embarked on convoy duties between different escort groups before being assigned to B-12 group, under Commander C D Howard-Johnston of Malcolm. During the winter of 1940 and throughout the summer of 1941, HMS Verbena operated with the group in the North Atlantic, before a refit in August 1941.

Following this Verbena was sent south to Freetown, then Cape Town, for operations in the South Atlantic, before being dispatched to the Far East. After the Japanese invasion of Malaya, and the fall of Singapore, Verbena was based at Colombo; in May 1942 while heading for Karachi her boilers gave out as a result of constant high-speed work and lack of cleaning and she had to be towed the last few hundred yards to a berth in Bombay for refit. After some months in India, where he made a number of horseback treks, Rayner and his crew came home.

Just after Christmas 1942, he was given assignment of the lead of an escort group, in command of the destroyer HMS Shikari, becoming one of the first RNVR officers in the Royal Navy (along with Commander E N Wood of HMS Atherstone a year earlier) to be so promoted. Rayner returned to familiar ground, with his group operating in the North Atlantic on convoy escort duty. In June 1943 he was to lead Operation Rosegarden, an attempt to hunt and kill U-boats as they crossed the Denmark Straits, but this was ultimately unsuccessful.

In October 1943 Rayner was given command of HMS Warwick, briefly joining B-5 EG, led by Havelock, before being given an Escort Group to operate in the Channel against E boats in preparation for D-Day. Just a day after taking station at Plymouth, on 20 February 1944, Rayner was with Warwick off Trevose Head when she was torpedoed, with the loss of 90 of her crew, by the submarine U-413 commanded by Kapitänleutnant Gustav Poel. He was picked up with other survivors by the steam trawler Lady Luck skippered by Victor Crisp.

Instead of taking "survivor's leave" after this experience, which had included being in the water as depth charges from a destroyer in pursuit of the U-boat exploded close by, Rayner, pressing Admiral Max Horton for "a destroyer with two funnels", was given command of HMS Highlander – "best-loved" of his wartime commands – joining B-4 Escort Group led by Helmsdale on the Gibraltar run.

Towards the end of 1944 he was appointed senior officer of a support group of Castle-class corvettes – 30th Escort Group – in command of Pevensey Castle and including Portchester Castle (later to 'play' Saltash Castle in The Cruel Sea), Launceston Castle and Kenilworth Castle. On the 11th of November 1944 Rayner's group gained an ASDIC contact off the southern coast of Ireland and attacked it. It was previously believed that this event led to the sinking of the German U-Boat U-1200, for which Rayner was credited. However, due to the discrepancy between the location of Rayner's attack and U-1200's wreck in the English channel, this has since been disproven. It is unclear what prompted the ASDIC contact which led to the attack.

As the Pevensey Castle was returning to her base, her steering broke in a northerly gale off the mouth of the River Foyle. Rayner nearly lost his ship on the long sandy spit leading to Magilligan Point before hand steering was connected. He writes that at this point "The candle was burned out". He sought three weeks leave of Max Horton who then posted him, in the months before V-E Day, to a senior staff role with Commander-in-Chief, Portsmouth, in the tunnel complex of Fort Southwick behind Portsmouth Harbour. Here, overseeing radar guided plots from deep underground in a way that would have been impossible at the start of the campaign, Rayner applied his specialist experience to the deployment of a large force of anti-submarine warships in the closing months of the war. Rayner speaks in Escort: The Battle of the Atlantic of his respect for one of his colleagues at the fort – First Officer Audrey Faith Parker, OBE, WRNS – for the seafaring experience she brought to her operational work. It was to her and her husband Gordon that Rayner, in 1946, after a stint as temporary commander of a naval air station at Kirkistown near Cloughy on the east coast of Northern Ireland, sold his yacht, laid up in north Wales for the duration, and moved his household to the first of several farms in the English home counties.

During a campaign that had lasted from 1939 to 1945, Rayner's youngest son, Vyvyan, reckoned (in April 2006) that his father took "as little as four or five weeks home leave in the whole period." After 24 years with the 'wavy navy' Rayner retired from the RNVR in 1949.

== Decorations ==
Rayner's Distinguished Service Cross was announced in the London Gazette of 29 December 1940, dated 1 January 1940, for the "hard and perilous task of sweeping the seas clear of enemy mines, and combating submarines" while commanding the trawler Loch Tulla. On 26 September 1941 it was announced that he had been Mentioned in Despatches 'for good services in action against enemy submarines' while commanding HMS Verbena. On 23 March 1943 the Gazette announced the award of the Volunteer Reserve Decoration (VRD). On 25 May 1945 he was awarded a bar to his DSC "for courage, skill and perseverance... in successful operations against enemy submarines."

Rayner was credited with the sinking of one U-boat on 11 November 1944 – U-1200, commanded by Hinrich Mangels, "to pay me back for Warwick". In an escort group action the fatal depth charges were dropped by Launceston Castle under Lieutenant R M Roberts, DSC, RNVR.

Rayner, though at the time given credit for sinking or damaging an unidentified U-boat on 22 May 1941' , had doubts even then, as he had about an earlier incident while in charge of 14th Anti-Submarine Group on HMT Loch Tulla, sailing towards Scapa Flow. He writes of picking up a strong asdic signal north of the Humber on the UK east coast, a depth charging exercise and a pool of oil, and later he mentions "thinking" that his first DSC, announced on 1 January 1940, was "probably" for this action "off Flamborough Head". He was uncertain whether this involved a genuine sinking, writing of the greater "difficulty" of damaging the "pressure hull" of a "modern submarine". Later Rayner refers to an action on 22–23 May 1941 when, in HMS Verbena, he engaged a U-boat on the surface after it had torpedoed the Dutch tanker Elusa and surfaced to inspect the burning wreck. The U-boat dived. Rayner depth charged a strong asdic contact, saw oil on the surface, lost contact and guided HMS Churchill, with deeper depth charges, to the same target, both ships remaining in the area until dawn on 24 May 1941. In the back inside cover of Escort Rayner's map of Western Approaches shows the cross-swords symbol of an engagement and the words "U-boat damaged by Verbena 22.4.41". Many years later – 2006 – Gudmundur Helgason, researcher of the Battle of the Atlantic points out that Elusa was sunk by U-93 "which certainly survived the attack" adding that "there were lots of those attacks reported (often with seemingly very convincing evidence at the time) that failed to sink or even damage an U-boat. Since 1955 there have been loads of revisions of U-boat fates, almost to this day even."

== Writer ==
Having written features in the yachting press before the war, Rayner's career as an author really began in 1955 with a personal account of 'his' war, called Escort: the Battle of the Atlantic published by Kimber, reissued by the Naval Institute Press (1999). He would have been the first to admit the difficulty of discerning the thread of his own experiences in a conflict that ran for the duration of World War II, involved the loss of 63,000 Allied sailors and airmen, 30,000 merchant seamen and 43,000 U-boat sailors. It was only because Captain Stephen Roskill, official historian of the war at sea, became a family friend in the 1950s, and, over a merry evening of food and drink in the Rayner household, succeeded in overcoming Rayner's inhibitions on the subject, that the latter put pen to paper to record his particular experiences of that gigantic campaign. Except that for Rayner the sea was "neither cruel nor kind", there are parallels between the war he describes in Escort and that of the fictional Commander Ericson in Nicholas Monsarrat's enormously successful post-war novel The Cruel Sea published at almost the same time as Rayner's book. In his editor's foreword to Escort, Stephen Roskill writes of Rayner's authority to speak on his subject: "I know of no other officer, let alone one of the Royal Naval Volunteer Reserve, who served continuously for more than five years in command of escort vessels; nor of any other who graduated from a trawler at the very beginning to a corvette, then to a small destroyer, and finally to command of a group of the new and greatly improved war-built escort vessels."

Mike Raymond of the Flower Class Corvette's Association reports a portrait of Rayner 'with pipe and beard' in the frontispiece of Escort – the picture at the start of this article emphasising this is more biography than history. Yet a 10-year perspective, enabled Rayner in 1955, to weave his and his men's experiences into a larger account of the Battle of the Atlantic, recording, for example, a fleeting and enticing glimpse of the chief protagonist in a four-day sea battle that began with the sinking of Britain's finest warship and closed with the destruction of a German battleship that ended Hitler's use of large surface raiders against allied convoys. While escorting the homeward-bound convoy SC 31, on board Verbena in company with Commander Bostock of HMS Churchill, Rayner spotted a big ship on the horizon hurrying southward: "... she was hull down and difficult to identify. I made to Churchill, 'Are you reporting what I think I see?' and got back the reply, 'Better not – identification by no means certain. Might cause confusion. Gather Suffolk has the situation in hand.'" Suffolk and Norfolk were cruisers following the Bismarck which, on 24 May 1941 had sunk HMS Hood, on which Rayner had served as a midshipman for three months in 1932.

In 1956, a year after Escort, came Rayner's first novel – The Enemy Below – the story of a prolonged duel between a U-boat and a British destroyer in September 1943. It was adapted in 1957 for an eponymous film by Dick Powell, in which the writer's destroyer HMS Hecate became the USS Haynes – in actuality USS Whitehurst – while his British captain, John Murrell, became an American played by Robert Mitchum with Curt Jürgens playing Rayner's U-boat skipper, Kapitän von Stolberg. Powell displays Rayner's book at the start of the trailer of The Enemy Below. Some of the actual experiences described in the novel and later transferred to film can be read in Rayner's low-key account of his encounter between corvettes and U-1200 off southern Ireland on 11 November 1944 between pages 224 and 228 of Escort.

Rayner's experiences in the Battle of the Atlantic, including taking a torpedoed fuel tanker in tow, also informed a later novel about convoy escort duty, The Crippled Tanker (1962) (titled The Long Haul in the US. The Crippled Tanker is set earlier than The Enemy Below in February 1943, and also involves the fictional destroyer HMS Hecate commanded by John Murrell.

In his novel The Long Fight (1958) Rayner wrote about a three-day ship-to-ship engagement in the Indian Ocean during the Napoleonic Wars; about tank warfare in The Small Spark of Courage (1959) (titled Valor in US editions of the novel), ). In 1966, with Alan Wykes, he wrote The Great Yacht Race, an illustrated account of a millionaires' yacht race from New York to Cowes in December 1866. Between 1961 and 1963 Rayner also published books on sailing, safety at sea in small craft and starting motorboating.

== Designer of small boats ==
Though his father was a keen 6-10 metre racing yachtsman, Rayner preferred the idea of cruising. On 6 June 1937, sailing his small boat out of Loch Fyne, he records passing "a ship which from the lines of her hull I think to have been the original Blue Dragon... if it were, it is poetic justice that I should meet her on my first cruise in my own designed ship in Scottish waters for it was her exploits as detailed in 'The Log of the Blue Dragon', by C.C.Lynam, read in "the library of a midland county preparatory school" that "first started the sailing canker" though "vows then made to sail my own ship to Scotland had to wait twenty years for fruition." Starting with an 18' open boat, and progressing via a 16' half-decked day sailer to a small converted fishing yawl, followed by a converted ex-fishing boat and then the 14 ton Tredwen barge yacht Pearl – burnt out on her moorings – Rayner was at last, in 1936, able try his hand at designing his own boat "after studying the 'How To' articles in the Y.M." Robinetta, a 4½ ton auxiliary gaff cutter, was built for him at the Rock Ferry yard of the Enterprise Small Craft Company, Birkenhead, and launched on 10 May 1937.

Elected in March 1935 to the Royal Cruising Club – 'an association of yachtsmen who prefer navigation to racing and are full of passionate interests' (Arthur Ransome 1912) – Rayner set out, in summer 1937, to follow 'skipper' Lynam's wake to the Western Highlands. Lynam's Blue Dragon was a small clinker built yawl of his own design, as was Robinetta , built on the Mersey, from where he sailed her to the Firth of Clyde. Thus Rayner, before he was 30, (and according to a self-description in his file at the Royal Institution of Naval Architects (RINA)) became an amateur yacht designer and experienced small boat sailor. Between 1937 and 1938 Rayner completed two short cruises in Robinetta, sometimes with his wife – "E" – and sometimes with RNVR comrades, Dick Taudevin and W.H. Simcoe, writing meticulous logs of intricate exploration of sea lochs with the added excitement of swift and sometimes rough open water passages, including encounters with overfalls and squalls, entranced by the scenery of these complicated shores. These pleasures ceased abruptly with the start of the war. Robinetta was laid up on chocks for the duration at a yard in Beaumaris, N.Wales, and sold in 1946.

After the long war at sea Rayner moved with his family to a farm at Hook near Basingstoke in Hampshire, and then to another farm near Burghclere, south of Newbury in Berkshire, and gave his attention to farming, horse riding and writing. In 2006 the owner of their old home, Earlstone Manor Farm, recalls accounts of Denys and Elizabeth Rayner's children's "extraordinary and happy childhood here, and the huge generosity of the Rayners, who took in old shell-shocked warriors, German Jewish refugee children, and the unhappy son of a British fascist leader, who were all cared for, loved and given security, at a time when conditions were still very primitive here and the family themselves extremely deprived."

At Earlstone the Rayners were neighbours to the Roskills, and it was Captain S.W. Roskill who encouraged his neighbour to write down his recollections of the war. Rayner's eldest son recalls that, as a result, his father "started thinking about boats, the sea, and boat design all over again". Publishing Escort, and then The Enemy Below, Rayner "gradually morphed back to where he had always wanted to be – in yacht design". He built his younger son a dingy to row on a local lake. "When it was finished", says Paul Vyvyan, "I was too big for it." So his dad acquired a small yacht – a Mystic, sail number 2, designed by Robert Tucker from C. E. Clark Boat Builders at Cornubia Yacht Yard at Cowes called Orchid – ostensibly for the boy, but he called it "our ship", making her easier to sail by adding a new stern.

In the late 1950s, a local manufacturer of plywood caravans asked Rayner to design a plywood dinghy to be offered with each caravan. As result of this collaboration Rayner started the Beacon Boat Company at a redundant turnery workshop in Donnington, a village on the River Lambourn north of Newbury, and applied all his enthusiasm and practicality to building and selling small family sailing boats of distinctive design.

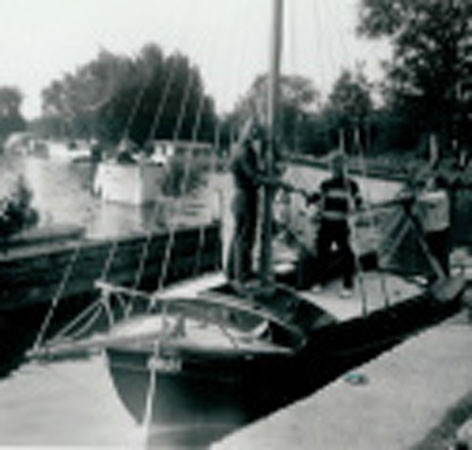
Westcoaster Zephyros with added bowsprit, circa 1964

Wartime advances in new bonding techniques had made plywood reliable even when constantly immersed in sea water. Using mahogany frames and the new marine plywood laminated with resorcinol glues, Rayner marked his return to the sea by building a 20-foot hard chine bilge keel gunter-rigged sloop – the Westcoaster – designed initially for a customer wishing to navigate the difficult waters and scarce harbours of the Bristol Channel, where Rayner had been torpedoed in 1944. Rayner gave the Westcoaster "sitting head room for tall men" – rare in yachts so small – while ingeniously camouflaging the reverse sheer needed for such generous accommodation by carrying the decks out to the sides of the boat as he had with Robinetta 20 years earlier. Similarly all the Westcoaster's running rigging came back to the cockpit making her easy to handle single-handed. He sailed and demonstrated the first of such yachts, painted a rich royal international blue – often called Oxford Blue – enthusing about its good looks, its affordability, its practicality for weekend "pottering" and fitness for deeper waters despite a draft of no more than 2 ft 3 in (69 cm). This design ensemble was topped by Rayner's preference for the gunter rig, its short mast, compared to a Bermudian, making it easier to tow on a trailer, to lower and raise, for the bridges of inland waterways, as well as allowing a swift reef – by lowering the boom – in a squall. Rayner also wrote that he valued the greater 'lifting' quality of a gaff or gunter mainsail as compared to the Bermudian main, prior to the wider use, with that rig, of masthead Genoas – headsails of greater area than the mainsail – which in Rayner's view, in 1962, was 'the herald of rigs to come' with 'great aerodynamic efficiency and with enormous lift!', and returning, in effect, "to the lateen-shaped loose-footed sails of the Mediterranean but with a taut forestay replacing the heavy lateen yard..." A small number of Westcoasters were later modified by the addition of a small bowsprit, with the cutter rig giving an even greater sail area.

Bilge or twin keels, a concept for many more years unfamiliar in America, allowed a boat to take the ground upright on a tripod comprising keels and a sturdy skeg, manoeuvre in shallow water, load and tow easily behind a family saloon, and be conveniently launched. Thus Rayner, developing a concept pioneered in 1922 by a fellow member of the RCC, Arthur Balfour, later Lord Riverdale, and became a key player in the expanding field of affordable chine plywood yachts, brilliantly popularised by Robert Tucker's Mystic, Debutante and Silhouette. Such a vessel could navigate canals and shallow estuaries including short-cuts through swatchways, take the ground safely and 'look after her crew' in hard weather, close to and off shore. It was a specification aimed at the innovative concept of 'family sailing', creating, and responding to, the enthusiasm, pockets and holidays of a post-war generation unused to enjoying the sea as a place for recreation and adventure.

In 1961, Rayner's Westcoaster was briefly followed by the rotund, though equally seaworthy, Corvette – a 5-ton sloop with full standing headroom. The problem he solved with this 'prototype' was to find a way of bending a marine-ply shell in two dimensions, creating a stronger and more attractive hull, on which the hard chine that had characterised plywood yachts including his Westcoaster, was so softened as to make it almost invisible. Rayner's people did this, under his direction, by steaming ply and laminating thinner sheets to achieve a compound bend of the necessary thickness. Refining the twin ballast keels of the Westcoaster, Rayner gave the Corvette – called Danica by her owner the broadcaster Jack Hargreaves – hydrofoil sectioned twin keels, flat on the outside and curved on the inside and very slightly toed in. As well as serving the same function as fin keels, the leeward moulded bilge keel used the Bernoulli's principle, to resist leeward drift as the boat heeled on a beat. Hargreaves' stepson with a companion, Chris Jameson, as her skipper, proved Danica by taking her through France by river and canal and on through the Mediterranean to Athens, returning via the Bay of Biscay where she successfully weathered F10 gale force winds (September 1962), but her construction costs focused Rayner's attention on the emerging technology of glass-reinforced plastic (GRP).

Having founded Beacon Boats Co. Ltd. to make and sell Westcoasters – about 60 altogether – and then the Corvette, Rayner experimented with a new enterprise making GRP sailing dinghies. From this temporary project he embarked on the factory manufacture of an ideal family sailing boat expanding, in 1963, to larger premises – temperature-and-humidity-controlled – as the firm of Westerly Marine Construction Ltd., at Hambledon Road, Waterlooville near Portsmouth on the Solent, with himself as Chief Designer, having become, in 1964, an Associate of the RINA. He recruited as his directors Kenneth Bates, Michael C.B.Hurd and David G.M.Sanders and Kenneth Todd, while Dodie Walker in Sales was regarded as integral to an enterprise Rayner was determined should attract customers who cared as much about his boats' interior comfort and convenience as their sailing qualities, for which Rayner sought Lloyd's certification. Two skilled boatbuilders – affectionately esteemed by Rayner as 'the walrus' and 'the carpenter' – were recruited to do the vital job of building the pattern moulds basic to GRP production. GRP was still so recent that he had to be satisfied with a Lloyd's Series Production Certificate affirming that the 4½-ton Westerly 22 – the company's first design – had been built under Lloyd's supervision including inspections and tests of hull strength and the factory conditions under which the moulded fibre glass used in construction went through the process, key to its long term integrity, of curing. Knowing that GRP yachts had not been around long enough to arrive at a proper assessment by Lloyd's of their durability, Rayner added exacting standards of his own to his designs, explaining why, after 40 years, such boats are still trusted by their owners.

Westerly Marine Construction Ltd. grew to be Britain's biggest yacht building company, and during the 1970s, a leader in family yachts. When Rayner was overseeing the construction of his brilliant little Westerly 22, he strengthened his friendship with Jack Hargreaves, who, as an enthusiastic populariser of "messing about in boats", filmed Young Tiger – W22 68 – departing the Solent for America. Rayner's letter, dated 14 December 1965, awaiting her young skipper, Hargreaves' stepson, at a poste restante in Bridgetown Barbados, read "Welcome to the Caribbean and well done! I think this is a justified remark because if you do not get this letter you won't have done so well! I am so glad you have Susanna with you. I shall of course calm down anyone who gets jumpy because I have complete confidence in you and the boat." Young Tiger, crewed by Simon Baddeley and Sue Pulford, telegrammed news of her arrival at Bridgetown on 5 January to Rayner at the 1966 London Boat Show with the words "EASY 29 DAYS. SIMON". They had sailed 2900 miles from the Las Palmas de Gran Canaria to Barbados in 29 days. Peter Guinness, Rear-Commodore of the Royal Cruising Club, in awarding the RCC Challenge Cup, wrote of a winning cruise that ended in Miami United States on 17 April 1966 "in a small, or even very small, ship".

== Achievement ==
Having led men and commanded ships in the Battle of the Atlantic, undoubtedly the most protracted and one of the most crucial of Britain's World War II campaigns, since it was about control of the nation's supply lines, Denys Rayner, who described himself, in his biographical account of the war in the Atlantic, as an 'amateur sailor', gave himself as much to the peace that followed, as he had to the war that won it.

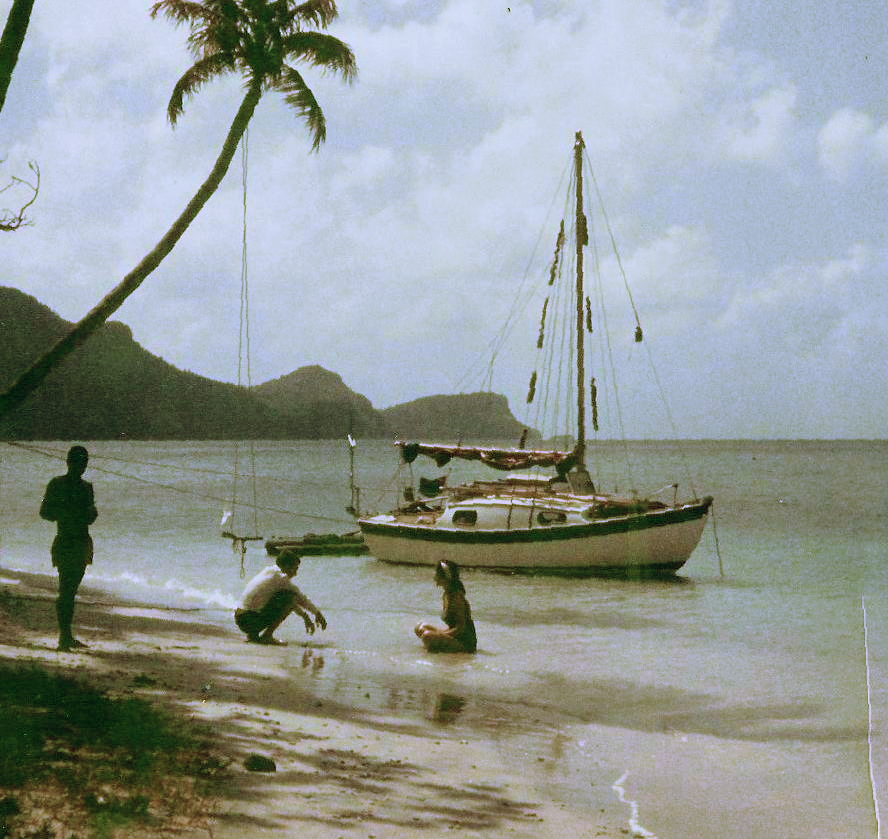
Young Tiger at Bequia 1966

He had seen his first two fibre glass designs – a Westerly 22 and a Westerly 25 (Lonesome Traveller owned by Ann and Slade Penoyre) were sailed across the Atlantic Ocean by relatively inexperienced seafarers of the kind which he probably dreamed of encouraging them to navigate wisely in deep waters. The photo of Young Tiger shown many of the qualities he had reportedly sought for his Westerly 22 – a shipshape 'baggywrinkled' small craft for everyman, was moored close to palm trees on a shallow Caribbean beach after the 29-day crossing of the Atlantic Ocean in Westerly 22, which crewed by two student friends.

Rayner's guidebooks for such adventurers include Safety in Small Craft, Coles, Harrap, De Graff (1961) and Small Boat Sailing, Collins Nutshell Books (1962). Seacraft technologies, especially navigational aids, have been transformed since these books were written, yet they contain timeless wisdom about taking a small ship to sea and bringing her home – without fuss. In Safety in Small Craft Rayner writes: "In any reasonable weather it is the diminutive size of the yacht which makes long passages under sail such thrilling affairs, and one of the reasons why I, for one, find the smallest possible craft the most rewarding" as well, he added, as costing less.

Ben Rayner's greatest peacetime contribution lay in his approach to designing, building and selling such small craft. A fascination with making model destroyers at school evolved into the making of Robinetta in which for a few years he voyaged for pleasure – a pleasure which, after his long war service, he made available to thousands. Starting with Robinetta – based in 2006 on the River Orwell near Harwich and still sailing, and then the rebuilt Orchid to share with his youngest son, Rayner graduated via the one-off Corvette to the Westerly 22, to the Westerly 25, the Westerly 30, the Windrush (a re-worked W25), and the Nomad 22 (a re-worked W22). Applying the husbandry, and inventiveness, that characterised his years as a professional sailor, Rayner applied design and techniques, including the crucial process of curing now recognised as so vital to enduring fibre glass construction, to products that sold themselves. In the recent words of one of his sons, "He was delighted when the butcher, the baker and candlestick maker arrived at the London Boat Show in the early 60s and put down deposits in cash. Boats at that time were produced by 12 men at 6 vessels per annum. With 12 men we built 50 a year. Their yachts cost £6,000. Ours were on a trailer for £1800." But if these small craft were swiftly made and so affordable, none left Rayner's factory unfit for the sea, of which he wrote "neither cruel nor kind... Any apparent virtues it may have, and all its vices, are seen only in relation to the spirit of man who pits himself, in ships of his own building, against its insensate power."

Rayner's home was in West Kirby until 1944, after which the family moved south to Holt Farm, Hook, near Basingstoke, Hampshire, from where he moved to Earlstone Manor Farm, Burghclere, moving again in mid-1963 to Hermitage Farm, Hermitage, both near Newbury in Berkshire. His last home, where he moved in late 1964, was Quarry Farm, West Meon, Hants. He married Isabelle Elizabeth (née Board) in 1933. They had a daughter, Clare, born 1938, and two sons, Martin Drake born in 1934 and Paul Vyvyan born in 1948, who scattered his father's ashes off Gilkicker Point.
