= HMCS New Westminster =

Flower-class corvette

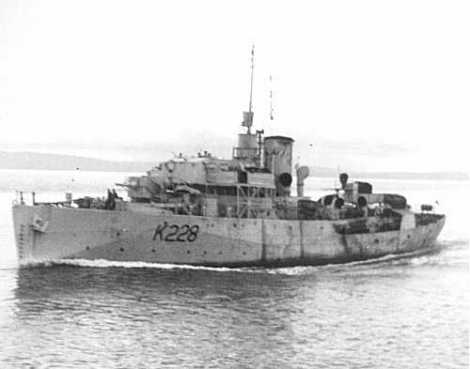
- HMCS New Westminster

History

Canada
- Name: New Westminster
- Namesake: New Westminster, British Columbia
- Builder: Victoria Machinery Depot Co. Ltd., Victoria
- Laid down: 4 February 1941
- Launched: 14 May 1941
- Commissioned: 31 January 1942
- Decommissioned: 21 June 1945
- Identification: Pennant number: K228
- Honours and awards: Atlantic 1942–45
- Fate: Sold for mercantile conversion, scrapped 1966

General characteristics
- Class & type: Flower-class corvette
- Displacement: 950 long tons (970 t; 1,060 short tons)
- Length: 203 ft (61.87 m)
- Beam: 33 ft (10.06 m)
- Draught: 13 ft (3.96 m)
- Propulsion: single shaft; 2 × water tube boilers; 1 × double acting triple-expansion reciprocating steam engine; 2,750 ihp (2,050 kW)
- Speed: 16.5 knots (30.6 km/h)
- Range: 3,500 nautical miles (6,482 km) at 12 knots (22.2 km/h)
- Complement: 5 officers, 61 enlisted
- Sensors & processing systems: 1 × SW1C or 2C radar; 1 × Type 123A or Type 127DV sonar
- Armament: 1 × BL 4 in (102 mm) Mk.IX single gun; 1 × 2-pounder Mk.VIII single "pom-pom"; 4 × Mk.II depth charge throwers; 2 depth charge rails with 60 depth charges

HMCS New Westminster was a Flower-class corvette that served with the Royal Canadian Navy during the Second World War. She saw action primarily in the Battle of the Atlantic. She was named for New Westminster, British Columbia.

== Background ==
Flower-class corvettes like New Westminster serving with the Royal Canadian Navy during the Second World War were different from earlier and more traditional sail-driven corvettes. The "corvette" designation was created by the French as a class of small warships; the Royal Navy borrowed the term for a period but discontinued its use in 1877. During the hurried preparations for war in the late 1930s, Winston Churchill reactivated the corvette class, needing a name for smaller ships used in an escort capacity, in this case based on a whaling ship design. The generic name "flower" was used to designate the class of these ships, which – in the Royal Navy – were named after flowering plants.

Corvettes commissioned by the Royal Canadian Navy during the Second World War were named after communities for the most part, to better represent the people who took part in building them. This idea was put forth by Admiral Percy W. Nelles. Sponsors were commonly associated with the community for which the ship was named. Royal Navy corvettes were designed as open sea escorts, while Canadian corvettes were developed for coastal auxiliary roles which was exemplified by their minesweeping gear. Eventually the Canadian corvettes would be modified to allow them to perform better on the open seas.

== Construction ==
New Westminster was ordered as part of the 1940–1941 Flower-class building program. She was identical to the 1939–1940 program except for a few changes. The 1940–41 program had water-tube boilers, which were less responsive but had more reliability in providing a consistent supply of steam. The second significant change was that no minesweeping gear was ever installed, as the role of the corvette had changed from coastal auxiliary to convoy escort.

New Westminster was laid down 4 February 1941 by Victoria Machinery Depot Co. Ltd. at Victoria, British Columbia and launched 14 May 1941. She was commissioned 31 January 1942 at Victoria. During her career, New Westminster had two major refits. The first significant overhaul took place at Sydney, Nova Scotia from May 1943 until 10 December 1943. During this refit she had her fo'c'sle extended. Her second major refit took place at Saint John from January to March 1945.

== Service history ==
New Westminster was assigned to Esquimalt Force on the west coast after workups. However, later that year she was reassigned to the east coast to replace corvettes departing for Operation Torch, the invasion of North Africa. She arrived at Halifax 13 October 1942 and was assigned to the Western Local Escort Force (WLEF).

With the WLEF, New Westminster escorted convoys on what became known as the "Triangle Run", the route between New York City, Boston and St. John's. She remained with that force until departing for her first major refit in May 1943.

After returning from workups, New Westminster was assigned to the Mid-Ocean Escort Force, the escort force that protected the Trans-Atlantic convoys. She joined escort group C-5 and in July 1944, alongside them, escorted the largest convoy of the war, HX 300. She departed for another refit at the end of the year. When she returned to service in April 1945, she was assigned to Sydney Force until the end of the war.

Upon cessation of hostilities, New Westminster was paid off at Sorel, Quebec 21 June 1945. She was transferred to the War Assets Corporation who sold her for mercantile conversion in 1947. In 1950 she reappeared as the merchant ship Elisa of 939 GRT. In 1952 she was renamed the Portoviejo and Azura in 1954. She remained under that name until she was sold in 1966 to be stripped at Tampa, Florida before being broken up at Tampico, Florida.
