= HMS Kenilworth Castle =

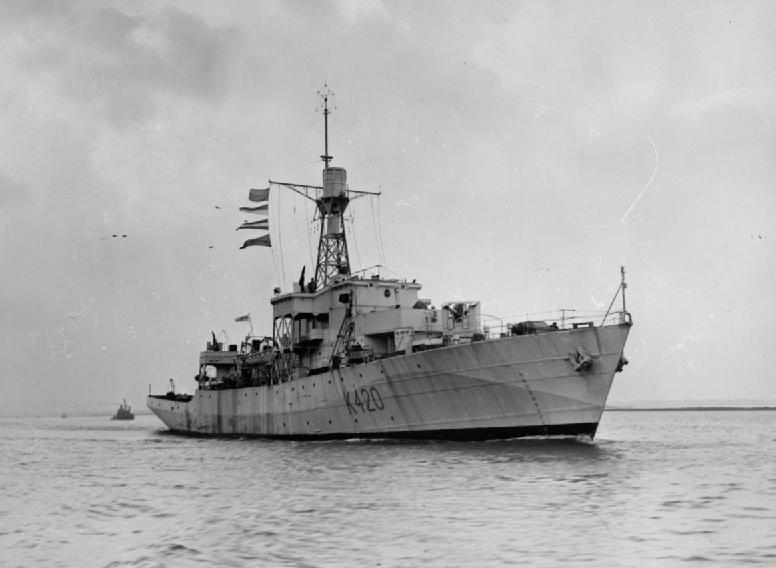
- Kenilworth Castle (K420) in November 1943

History

United Kingdom
- Name: Kenilworth Castle
- Namesake: Kenilworth Castle
- Builder: Smiths Dock Company
- Launched: 17 August 1943
- Commissioned: 14 November 1943
- Identification: Pennant number: K420
- Fate: Scrapped, June 1956

General characteristics (as built)
- Class & type: Castle-class corvette
- Displacement: 1,010 long tons (1,030 t) (standard)
- Length: 252 ft (76.8 m)
- Beam: 33 ft (10.1 m)
- Draught: 13 ft 9 in (4.2 m) (deep load)
- Installed power: 2 Admiralty 3-drum boilers; 2,880 ihp (2,150 kW)
- Propulsion: 1 shaft, 1 triple-expansion engine
- Speed: 16.5 knots (30.6 km/h; 19.0 mph)
- Range: 6,500 nmi (12,000 km; 7,500 mi) at 15 knots (28 km/h; 17 mph)
- Complement: 99
- Sensors & processing systems: Type 145 and Type 147 ASDIC; Type 272 search radar; HF/DF radio direction finder
- Armament: 1 × QF 4 in (102 mm) DP gun; 2 × twin, 2 × single 20 mm (0.8 in) AA guns; 1 × 3-barrel Squid anti-submarine mortar; 1 × depth charge rail and 2 throwers; 15 depth charges

HMS Kenilworth Castle (K420) was a Castle-class corvette built for the Royal Navy during the Second World War. Completed in late 1943, she began escorting trans-Atlantic convoys in early 1944, before being assigned to the Gibraltar-UK route in May. Her escort group was reorganized in September and was assigned to patrol British waters and support other escort units as needed until Germany surrendered in May 1945. The ship contributed to the sinking of two German submarines, one in March 1944 and the other in November. Kenilworth Castle was assigned to air-sea rescue duties for several months after the end of the war.

She became a training ship in 1946 before she was reduced to reserve two years later. The ship was sold for scrap in 1959 and subsequently broken up.

== Design and description ==
The Castle-class corvette was a stretched version of the preceding Flower class, enlarged to improve seakeeping and to accommodate modern weapons. The ships displaced 1,010 long tons (1,030 t) at standard load and 1,510 long tons (1,530 t) at deep load. The ships had an overall length of 252 feet (76.8 m), a beam of 36 feet 9 inches (11.2 m) and a deep draught of 13 feet 9 inches (4.2 m). They were powered by a four-cylinder triple-expansion steam engine driving one propeller shaft using steam provided by two Admiralty three-drum boilers. The engine developed a total of 2,880 indicated horsepower (2,150 kW) and gave a speed of 16.5 knots (30.6 km/h; 19.0 mph). The Castles carried enough fuel oil to give them a range of 6,500 nautical miles (12,000 km; 7,500 mi) at 15 knots (28 km/h; 17 mph). The ships' complement was 99 officers and ratings.

The Castle-class ships were equipped with a single QF 4-inch (102 mm) Mk XVI dual-purpose gun forward, but their primary weapon was their single three-barrel Squid anti-submarine mortar. This was backed up by one depth charge rail and two throwers for 15 depth charges. The ships were fitted with two twin and a pair of single mounts for 20-millimetre (0.8 in) Oerlikon AA guns. Provision was made for a further four single mounts if needed. They were equipped with Type 145Q and Type 147B ASDIC sets to detect submarines by reflections from sound waves beamed into the water. A Type 272 search radar and a HF/DF radio direction finder rounded out the Castles' sensor suite.

== Construction and career ==
Kenilworth Castle was ordered on 19 December 1942 and was laid down by Smiths Dock Company at their shipyard in South Bank, North Yorkshire, on 7 May 1943. The ship was launched on 17 August and completed on 22 November. After several weeks of training in Western Approaches Command's Anti-Submarine Training School at Tobermory, Mull, she joined Escort Group B7 escorting convoys to Canada in January 1944. On 5 March she was detached from Escort Group B7 to reinforce Escort Group C2 which was prosecuting a U-boat contact. Kenilworth Castle attacked U-744 with her Squid three times before her ASDIC broke down; subsequent attacks by the Canadian ships eventually forced the U-boat to surface the following day. This was the first time that a Castle-class corvette had been involved in the sinking of a U-boat.

The ship was transferred to Escort Group B4 on the Gibraltar-UK run in May; the group was reorganized and redesignated as the 30th Escort Group on 29 August with the mission to patrol British waters and reinforce other escort groups as needed. On 10 November U-1200 was detected by radar and was then acquired by Kenilworth Castle's sister Launceston Castle's ASDIC on the night of 11 November. The group pinned down the submarine for three days with Kenilworth Castle contributing a single Squid attack; the entire group was credited with sinking U-1200. The ship remained with the group past Germany's surrender on 8 May; her last convoy arrived in Derry on 2 June 1945. Beginning in July she was assigned the air-sea rescue mission in Freetown and Dakar through October.

Kenilworth Castle was assigned to the training squadron in Portland Harbour in 1946 and was reduced to reserve in 1948. She was sold for scrap to E. Rees in 1959 and arrived at Llanelli on 20 June.

== Bibliography ==
- Campbell, N. J. M. (1980). "Great Britain (including Empire Forces)". In Chesneau, Roger (ed.). Conway's All the World's Fighting Ships 1922–1946. Conway Maritime Press. pp. 2–85. ISBN 0-85177-146-7.
- Colledge, J. J.; Warlow, Ben & Bush, Steve (2020). Ships of the Royal Navy: The Complete Record of all Fighting Ships of the Royal Navy from the 15th Century to the Present (5th revised and updated ed.). Seaforth Publishing. ISBN 978-1-5267-9327-0.
- Goodwin, Norman; compiled by (2007). Castle Class Corvettes: An Account of the Service of the Ships and of Their Ships' Companies. Maritime Books. ISBN 978-1-904459-27-9.
- Lenton, H. T. (1998). British & Empire Warships of the Second World War. Naval Institute Press. ISBN 1-55750-048-7.
