= MV Loch Awe =

Passenger ferry

History
- Name: Loch Awe
- Namesake: Loch Awe
- Owner: Caledonian Maritime Assets (CMAL)
- Operator: Caledonian MacBrayne
- Port of registry: (United Kingdom) Glasgow
- Route: TBC
- Ordered: March 2025
- Builder: Remontowa Shipbuilding, Gdańsk, Poland
- Yard number: B621/1
- Laid down: December 2025
- Status: Under construction

General characteristics
- Type: Ro-ro vehicle and passenger ferry
- Tonnage: 135 dt
- Length: 49.90 m (163 ft 9 in)
- Beam: 12.48 m (40 ft 11 in)
- Draught: 2.14 m (7 ft 0 in)
- Installed power: 750 kW
- Propulsion: 4-off 187 kW azimuth thrusters
- Speed: 9 kn (17 km/h)
- Capacity: 150 passengers and 24 cars, or; 250 passengers and 16 cars
- Crew: 5

MV Loch Awe (Scottish Gaelic: Loch Obha) is a roll-on/roll-off vehicle and passenger ferry currently under construction in Poland for use on Caledonian MacBrayne routes on the west coast of Scotland. She is the first of the seven vessels comprising Phase 1 of Caledonian Maritime Assets' small vessel replacement project (SVRP), which will replace the existing ferries serving seven Caledonian MacBrayne routes. She is designed to be predominantly electrically powered, though may require to be run on diesel until shore power can be fully set up.

== History ==
Planning for the small vessel replacement project began in 2021, and in March 2025 Caledonian Maritime Assets Ltd (CMAL) awarded a contract to build seven vessels to Remontowa Shipbuilding of Gdańsk in Poland, the same shipyard that built MVs Argyle, Bute and Finlaggan. The first steel was cut for the first of the vessels in September 2025, and her keel was laid in December, at which point CMAL announced that she would be named Loch Awe. Other vessels in the class will also be named after Scottish lochs, with the seven names to be used having been selected following a public vote.

Loch Awe is scheduled to be launched in the first quarter of 2027. Delivery is currently expected in 2027.

== Layout and facilities ==
All vessels in Phase 1 of the SVRP share the same basic design, being similar to the "loch class" vessels they are to replace. This features a single open vehicle deck, with a passenger lounge located alongside. An open passenger deck is situated above the lounge, with a single tower-style wheelhouse located above this. The design is double-ended, however the passenger lounge is nominally situated on the starboard side of the vessel. There are to be two deck variants depending on the nature of the route to be served, as certain routes carry larger numbers of foot passengers. As of January 2026 it had not been confirmed which configuration was to be used for Loch Awe.

- Design A, accommodating approximately 150 passengers and 24 cars, features three lanes of traffic and a narrower passenger lounge.
- Design B, accommodating approximately 250 passengers and 16 cars, features two lanes of traffic and a wider passenger lounge.

Loch Awe is intended to operate as an electrically-powered vessel, however two 430 kWe backup diesel generators are included for use in case of emergencies or for range extension. She will have approximately 5.7 MWh of battery storage, sufficient to allow her to operate a full day on battery power, charging up overnight.

== Service ==
The seven routes to be served by the vessels of Phase 1 of the SVRP are listed below. As of January 2026, it had not been confirmed which route Loch Awe was destined to serve.

- Design A
  - Colintraive – Rhubodach, replacing MV Loch Dunvegan
  - Lochaline – Fishnish, replacing MV Lochinvar (to be cascaded elsewhere in the network)
  - Tayinloan – Gigha, replacing MV Loch Ranza
  - Tarbert (Loch Fyne) - Portavadie, replacing MV Isle of Cumbrae
  - Sconser – Raasay, replacing MV Hallaig (to be cascaded, probably to Cumbrae, to replace MV Loch Riddon as second summer vessel, with a possibility for a higher passenger capacity)
- Design B
  - Iona – Fionnphort, replacing MV Loch Buie
  - Tobermory – Kilchoan, replacing MV Loch Tarbert
