= MV Loch Linnhe =

Scottish ferry built in 1986

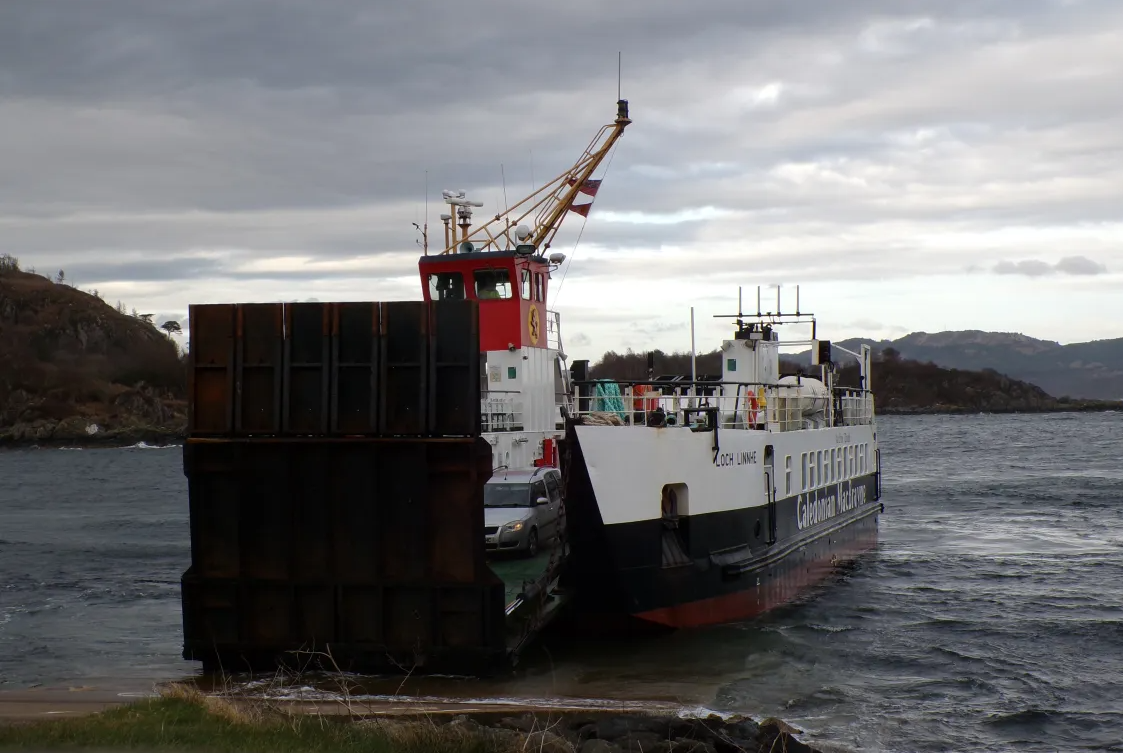
- MV Loch Linnhe arriving at Tarbert

History

United Kingdom
- Name: MV Loch Linnhe; Scottish Gaelic: An Linne Dhubh
- Namesake: Loch Linnhe
- Owner: Caledonian Maritime Assets Limited
- Operator: Caledonian MacBrayne
- Port of registry: Glasgow
- Route: Spare/relief vessel
- Builder: R. Dunston, Hessle, East Riding of Yorkshire
- Yard number: H953
- Launched: 22 May 1986
- In service: 4 July 1986
- Identification: IMO number: 8512308; Callsign: MEXR9; MMSI Number: 232003369
- Status: in service

General characteristics
- Class & type: ro-ro vehicle ferry
- Tonnage: 206 GT; 65 DWT
- Length: 30.2 m (99 ft 1 in)
- Beam: 10 m (32 ft 10 in)
- Draught: 1.5 m (4 ft 11 in)
- Installed power: 6-cyl Volvo Penta
- Propulsion: 2 × Voith Schneider Propellers
- Speed: 9 kn (17 km/h)
- Capacity: 200 passengers and 12 cars
- Crew: 3

MV Loch Linnhe (Scottish Gaelic: An Linne Dhubh) is a Caledonian Maritime Assets Limited ro-ro car ferry, built in 1986 and operated by Caledonian MacBrayne After over ten years at Largs, she was the summer vessel on the Tobermory–Kilchoan crossing from 1999 to 2017.

== History ==
MV Loch Linnhe was the second of four drive-through ferries built in the 1980s by Dunston's of Hessle, to cope with increasing traffic on CalMac's smaller routes.

== Layout ==
The four vessels are based on the design of MV Isle of Cumbrae. They have a second passenger lounge, on the port side, reducing the capacity of the car deck to 12. The wheelhouse is painted red and given a black top, as she has no funnels as such.

== Service ==
MV Loch Linnhe replaced MV Canna on the Lochaline–Fishnish crossing in July 1986. After one month, she moved to the Largs–Great Cumbrae crossing, in place of MV Isle of Cumbrae, She operated this crossing with her sister ship, MV Loch Striven for eleven years, until 1997, when Loch Striven was replaced by another sister, MV Loch Riddon.

In 1998, after an earlier winter season on the service, Loch Linnhe moved to the Tarbert–Portavadie crossing, previously operated in the summer by MV Rhum and then MV Bruernish. In early 1999 she was replaced by MV Isle of Cumbrae and became the summer vessel on the Tobermory–Kilchoan crossing. In the winter seasons, she is usually relieved by MV Raasay for overhaul at Ardmaleish, followed by relief duties. She has seen relief service at Raasay, Iona, Gigha, Eriskay, Fishnish, Lochaline, Lochranza, Lismore and Bute.

In Summer 2017, in response to rising vehicle traffic, Loch Linnhe was displaced on the Tobermory to Kilchoan route by MV Loch Tarbert, herself displaced from the Lochranza to Claonaig service by MV Catriona. Loch Linnhe became a spare/relief vessel.

In June 2024, Loch Linnhe was redeployed to the Tobermory - Kilchoan route to cover for Loch Tarbert, which was required to operate on a less exposed route due to technical problems.
