= MV Loch Riddon =

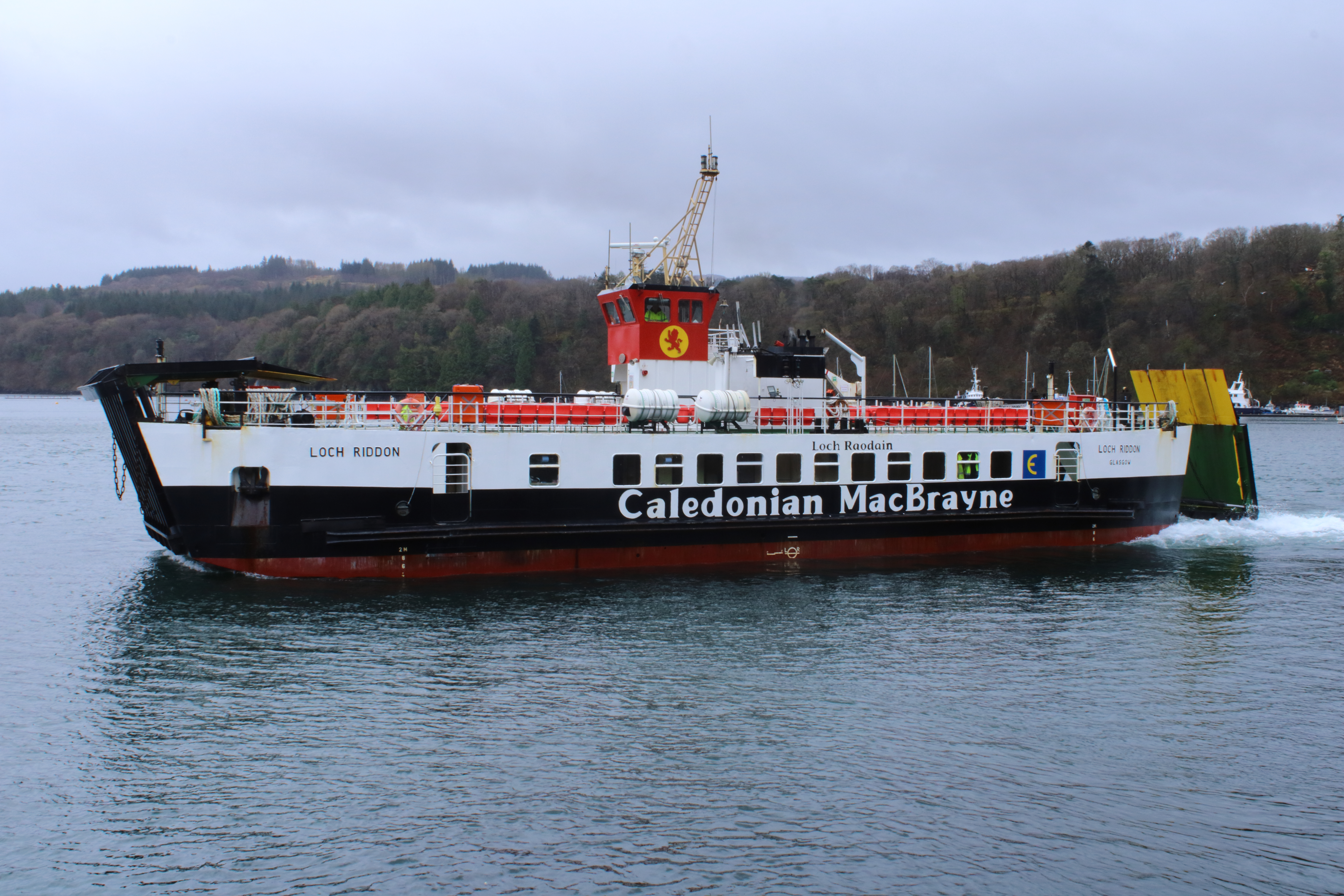
- MV Loch Riddon at Tobermory, Mull

History

United Kingdom
- Name: MV Loch Riddon; Scottish Gaelic: Loch Raodain
- Namesake: Loch Riddon, to the north of Bute
- Owner: Caledonian Maritime Assets Limited
- Operator: Caledonian MacBrayne
- Port of registry: Glasgow
- Route: Tobermory–Kilchoan (summer) Relief (winter)
- Builder: R.Dunston, Hessle, East Riding of Yorkshire
- Yard number: H954
- Launched: 9 April 1986
- In service: 7 November 1986
- Identification: IMO number: 8519875; Callsign: MFNN7; MMSI Number: 232003371
- Status: in service

General characteristics
- Class & type: ro-ro vehicle ferry
- Tonnage: 206 GT; 65 DWT
- Length: 30.2 m (99 ft 1 in)
- Beam: 10 m (32 ft 10 in)
- Draught: 1.5 m (4 ft 11 in)
- Installed power: 6-cyl Volvo Penta
- Propulsion: 2 × Voith Schneider Propellers
- Speed: 9 kn (17 km/h)
- Capacity: 200 passengers and 12 cars
- Crew: 3

MV Loch Riddon (Scottish Gaelic: Loch Raodain) is a Caledonian Maritime Assets Limited ro-ro car ferry, built in 1986 and operated by Caledonian MacBrayne. After the first eleven years of her life in the Kyles of Bute, she served at Largs between 1997 and 2013. After a short spell as the Lismore vessel she returned to Largs in June 2014.

== History ==
MV Loch Riddon was the third of four drive-through ferries built in the 1980s by Dunston's of Hessle, to cope with increasing traffic on CalMac's smaller routes.

== Layout ==
The four vessels are based on the design of MV Isle of Cumbrae. They have a second passenger lounge, on the port side, reducing the capacity of the car deck to 12. The wheelhouse is painted red and given a black top, as she has no funnels as such.

== Service ==
MV Loch Riddon took up the Kyles of Bute crossing, between Colintraive and Rhubodach, in November 1986, replacing the ex-Skye ferries, MV Portree and MV Broadford. She spent 11 years rarely venturing from this crossing.

In 1997 Loch Riddon replaced her sister, MV Loch Striven, at Largs.

She sailed at first alongside her other sister ship, MV Loch Linnhe, until she was replaced by MV Loch Alainn. These two ships sailed together for 10 years until 2007 when the new MV Loch Shira entered service, displacing Loch Alainn. Loch Riddon remained employed at Largs in the summer and as a winter relief vessel until 2013 when Loch Striven took on her duties after being replaced by MV Hallaig. Loch Riddon replaced MV Eigg as the full-time Lismore vessel for a short period of time before returning to the Largs service.

In 2024, owing to damage to Loch Shira's ramps, Loch Riddon was accompanied by a succession of vessels, including MV Isle of Cumbrae, MV Loch Bhrusda, and MV Loch Tarbert. Loch Riddon also saw service operating between Tarbert, Kintyre and Portavadie and between Tobermory, Mull and Kilchoan, covering for vessels redeployed to Largs. She continued the service between Tobermory and Kilchoan at the start of the 2025 summer timetable, with Isle of Cumbrae taking up her former roster at Largs.

In September 2024, Loch Riddon and MV Loch Bhrusda were originally planned to cover the Sconser – Raasay route, while the regular vessel MV Hallaig was away on overhaul. Due to delays in MV Lochnevis returning from overhaul, Loch Bhrusda was required to stay on the Small Isles route; as a result Loch Riddon took over the Sconser – Raasay route on her own.
