= MV Raasay =

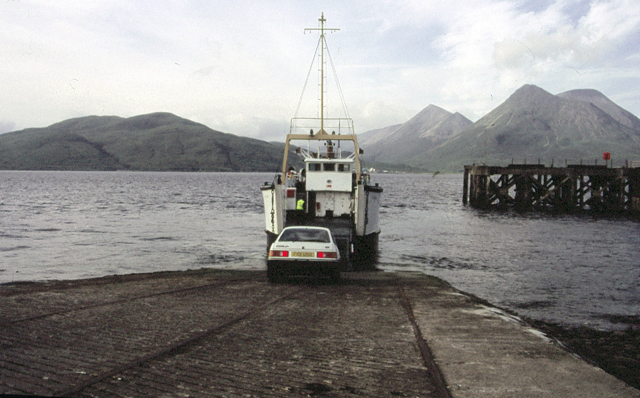
- at Suisnish Pier

History

Ireland
- Name: MV Raasay
- Owner: Clare Island Ferry Company, Westport, Co. Mayo
- Route: Island of Inishbofin, County Galway
- Acquired: March 2018
- Identification: Call sign: EIUL5; MMSI Number: 250005309; IMO Number: 7340435
- Status: in service

United Kingdom
- Name: MV Raasay
- Namesake: Island of Raasay
- Owner: Caledonian Maritime Assets
- Route: 1976–1997: Sconser–Raasay; 1997–2017: spare; 2004–2017 (winter): Tobermory–Kilchoan
- Builder: James Lamont & Co, Port Glasgow; Engines: 1: Bergius Kelvin Co. Ltd., Glasgow; 2: Scania turbocharged diesels
- Yard number: 425
- Launched: 23 March 1976
- In service: 30 April 1976
- Out of service: 23 January 2018
- Home port: Glasgow
- Identification: Call sign: 2IUC; IMO Number: 7340435; MMSI Number: 232003373
- Fate: Sold

General characteristics
- Tonnage: 69 GRT; 33 LT DWT
- Length: 22.50 m (73 ft 10 in)
- Beam: 6.40 m (21 ft 0 in)
- Draught: 1.40 m (4 ft 7 in)
- Installed power: 2 × Scania D9 93M35 turbocharged 6-cylinder diesels
- Speed: 8 kn (15 km/h)
- Capacity: 75 passengers; 6 cars

MV Raasay is a bow-loading passenger and vehicle ferry formerly owned by Caledonian Maritime Assets serving Raasay until 2001. She now operates a cargo service to Inishbofin, County Galway from Cleggan.

== History ==
Built in Port Glasgow, Raasay was the eighth and last Island Class ferry. On replacing MV Canna at Raasay, she became the third ferry there in two years.

MV Raasay was one of the first CMAL ships to receive its Inventory of Hazardous Materials or "Green Passport". She has appeared on several TV programmes, including Balamory, Distant Shores and on a Peugeot TV advert.

== Layout ==
MV Raasay has a single deck with a ramp at the bow and a small lounge and toilet.

== Service ==
MV Raasay was built for the crossing between Sconser on the Isle of Skye, and the nearby island of Raasay, where she remained for two decades. She never missed a full day's sailings on that route, only leaving Raasay for her own overhaul, when she was relieved by one of her older sisters. She also took some charters to Rona.

In summer 1997, to handle increasing traffic, she was replaced by the larger MV Loch Striven and became a spare ferry. Lying at Oban or Tobermory, she occasionally relieved MV Eigg and MV Coll. From 2003, she operated the winter service from Tobermory to Kilchoan. She also relieved MV Lochnevis on the Small Isles run and MV Canna at Ballycastle.

Raasay was offered for sale in December 2017. She took her last sailing with CalMac on 23 January, from Kilchoan to Tobermory. On 24 January, she headed to Oban awaiting her sale. By March 2018, the vessel had been handed back to owner Caledonian Maritime Assets and was soon sold to new Irish owners.

As of June 2021, Raasay is serving as a cargo vessel under an Irish flag on the west coast of Ireland, servicing the island of Inishbofin, County Galway from the mainland at Cleggan.
