= MV Catriona =

UK ro-ro ferry

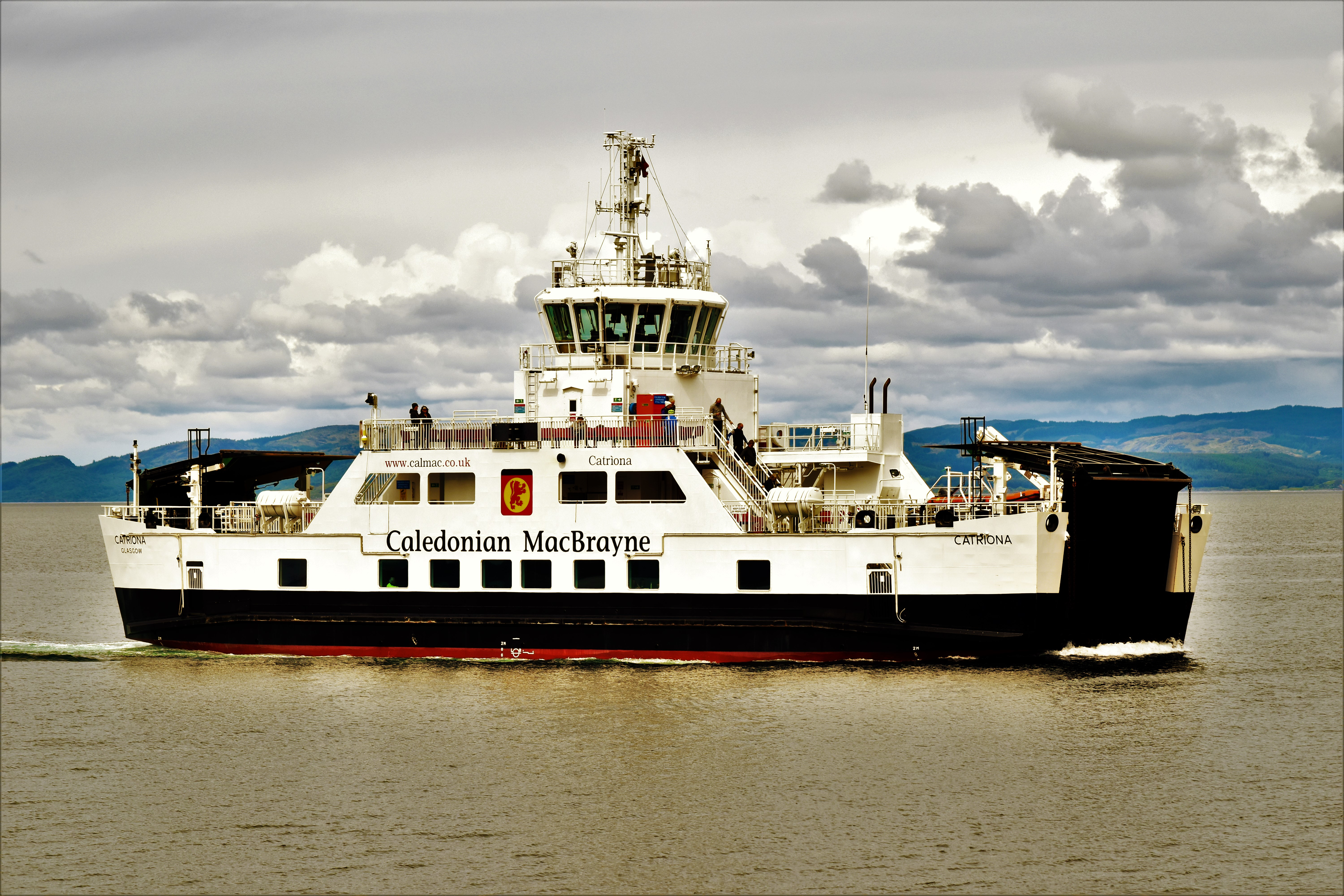
- Approaching Lochranza, Arran from Claonaig, May 2019.

History

United Kingdom
- Name: MV Catriona
- Namesake: Catriona
- Owner: Caledonian Maritime Assets
- Operator: Caledonian MacBrayne
- Port of registry: Glasgow
- Route: Claonaig–Lochranza (summer); Tarbert–Portavadie (winter); Tarbert–Lochranza (winter)
- Ordered: September 2014
- Builder: Ferguson Marine Engineering Ltd, Port Glasgow
- Cost: £12,300,000
- Yard number: 727
- Launched: 11 December 2015
- Christened: by Mrs. Anna Østergaard
- Completed: 2016
- Identification: IMO number: 9759862; MMSI Number: 235116772; Call Sign: 2JKV7
- Status: in service

General characteristics
- Type: hybrid ro-ro vehicle and passenger ferry
- Tonnage: 499 Gross tonnage; 135 Deadweight
- Length: 43.5 m (142 ft 9 in) (Overall); 39.99 m (131 ft 2 in) (Between Perpendiculars)
- Beam: 12.2 m (40 ft 0 in)
- Draught: 1.73 m (5 ft 8 in)
- Deck clearance: 5.1 m (16 ft 9 in)
- Installed power: Diesel Electric Hybrid: 3 × Volvo Penta Marine D13 MG and Lithium Ion batteries; Machinery: 2 × permanent Magnet Motor 375 kW each
- Propulsion: 2x Voith 16 R5 EC/90-1 Units
- Speed: 9 kn (17 km/h)
- Capacity: 150 passengers; 22 cars; 2 HGVs
- Crew: 3

MV Catriona (Scottish Gaelic: Catrìona) is a diesel electric hybrid passenger and vehicle roll-on, roll-off ferry built for Caledonian MacBrayne for the Claonaig–Lochranza crossing. She is the third hybrid ferry commissioned and owned by Caledonian Maritime Assets, one of three such ferries in the world to incorporate a low-carbon hybrid system of diesel electric and lithium-ion battery power. The ferries are sea-going and are nearly 46 metres (150 ft) long, accommodating 150 passengers, 23 cars or two HGVs.

== History ==
Catriona was launched on 11 December 2015 at Ferguson Marine Engineering in Port Glasgow by Mrs Anna Østergaard, wife of CMAL chairman Erik Østergaard. Catriona was the first ship to be built at the Ferguson yard following its purchase by Clyde Blowers Capital.

The ships in the hybrid fleet are named after Scottish literature. The first, MV Hallaig, entered service on the Sconser to Raasay route in October 2013. The second, MV Lochinvar entered service on the Tarbert to Portavadie route in 2014. Catriona is a novel written by Robert Louis Stevenson in 1893.

Catriona was awarded ‘Electric & Hybrid Propulsion System of the Year’ in 2016.

== Layout ==
Catriona can accommodate 150 passengers, 23 cars or 2 HGVs. She has a service speed of 9 knots (17 km/h) and is powered by small diesel generator sets, feeding power to a 400-volt switchboard, which supplies power to electric propulsion motors that turn the propulsion units. In addition, two lithium-ion battery banks with a total of 700 kWh are also available to supply power to the units. The battery banks will be charged overnight from the mains. It is anticipated that renewable energy sources will be used to charge the batteries in future, further reducing the carbon footprint.

Experience has shown that hybrid vessels can reduce fuel consumption by up to 38% compared with a conventionally powered vessel of the same size. This will result in a decrease in CO_{2} emissions in excess of 5,500 tonnes per vessel over their lifetime, with a similar decrease in sulphur and nitrogen oxide emissions.

== Service ==
CalMac's hybrid ferries are designed to operate on many of the short crossing routes around the Clyde and Hebrides. Catriona displaced MV Loch Tarbert on the Claonaig-Lochranza crossing to meet increasing demand on this route in 2016.

In June 2017, MV Loch Bhrusda provided additional sailings on the Claonaig-Lochranza route alongside Catriona while MV Isle of Arran was away at James Watt Dock for emergency repairs.

In January 2018, Catriona was the relief vessel on the Largs-Cumbrae ferry crossing while MV Loch Shira went for overhaul.

In March 2019, Catriona operated a shuttle service on the Claonaig-Lochranza crossing after MV Caledonian Isles sustained damage to her bow visor as a result of ramming the pier at Brodick.

In November 2023, Catriona relieved Lochinvar on the service between Lochaline and Fishnish, Isle of Mull.

In February and March 2024, Catriona operated an enhanced timetable between Lochranza and Claonaig rather than the timetabled daily return from Tarbert to Lochranza. This was due to capacity issues on the Ardrossan to Brodick service owing to the removal from service of MV Caledonian Isles and her replacement with the smaller MV Isle of Arran.
