= Caledonian Maritime Assets =

Scottish government-owned ferry corporation

Caledonian Maritime Assets Limited
- Type: Public corporation (state-owned)
- Industry: Water transport
- Founded: 2006
- Headquarters: Port Glasgow, Scotland
- Area served: River Clyde, Outer Hebrides, Inner Hebrides
- Services: Ferries, harbours
- Owner: Scottish Government
- Website: www.cmassets.co.uk

Caledonian Maritime Assets Limited (usually shortened to CMAL or CMAssets; Stòras Mara Cailleannach Earr in Scottish Gaelic) owns the ferries, ports, harbours and infrastructure for the ferry services serving the west coast of Scotland, the Firth of Clyde and the Northern Isles.

CMAL is a wholly owned public corporation of the Scottish Government, with Scottish ministers as sole shareholders.

== History ==
Until 1 October 2006 Caledonian MacBrayne Ltd, which was wholly owned by the Scottish government, provided the majority of the Clyde and Hebrides ferry services and owned the associated vessels and a number of the ports and harbour facilities that the vessels used. These services required an annual revenue deficit grant from the then Scottish Executive to maintain lifeline service levels.

To comply with European guidelines on State Aids in Maritime Transport, an open public tender was deemed necessary in respect of these ferry services and the Clyde and Hebrides Ferry Services (CHFS) was tendered as a single bundle, with the exception of the Gourock-Dunoon service.

In recognition of the uniqueness of the fleet and to ensure a level playing field for all bidders, on 1 October 2006 Caledonian MacBrayne Ltd was split into:

- An asset-owning company, Caledonian Maritime Assets Ltd (CMAL)
- A new operating company, CalMac Ferries Ltd (CFL).

This was done by Caledonian MacBrayne Ltd transferring its operations—but not its assets—to CFL. The operation of the lifeline ferry service was then put out to open competitive tender.

CMAL now owns all vessels, the majority of land-based assets (ports, harbours, etc.) and the Caledonian MacBrayne brand, and makes them available to an operator through an open tendering process. CFL continues to operate the services after winning the tendering process and holds the Public Services Contract (PSC) until 30 September 2013. Under the terms of the tender, CFL is bound to use the vessels of CMAL.

== Business ==
CMAL's responsibilities include:

- Maintaining, improving and enhancing assets such as vessels and the land and property around piers and harbours
- Seeking extra investment to invest in ferries and harbour facilities
- Working with stakeholders within Scotland and the wider maritime community to be acknowledged as the principal provider of the most cost-effective, innovative ferries and port infrastructure to the benefit of local communities

== Ferries ==
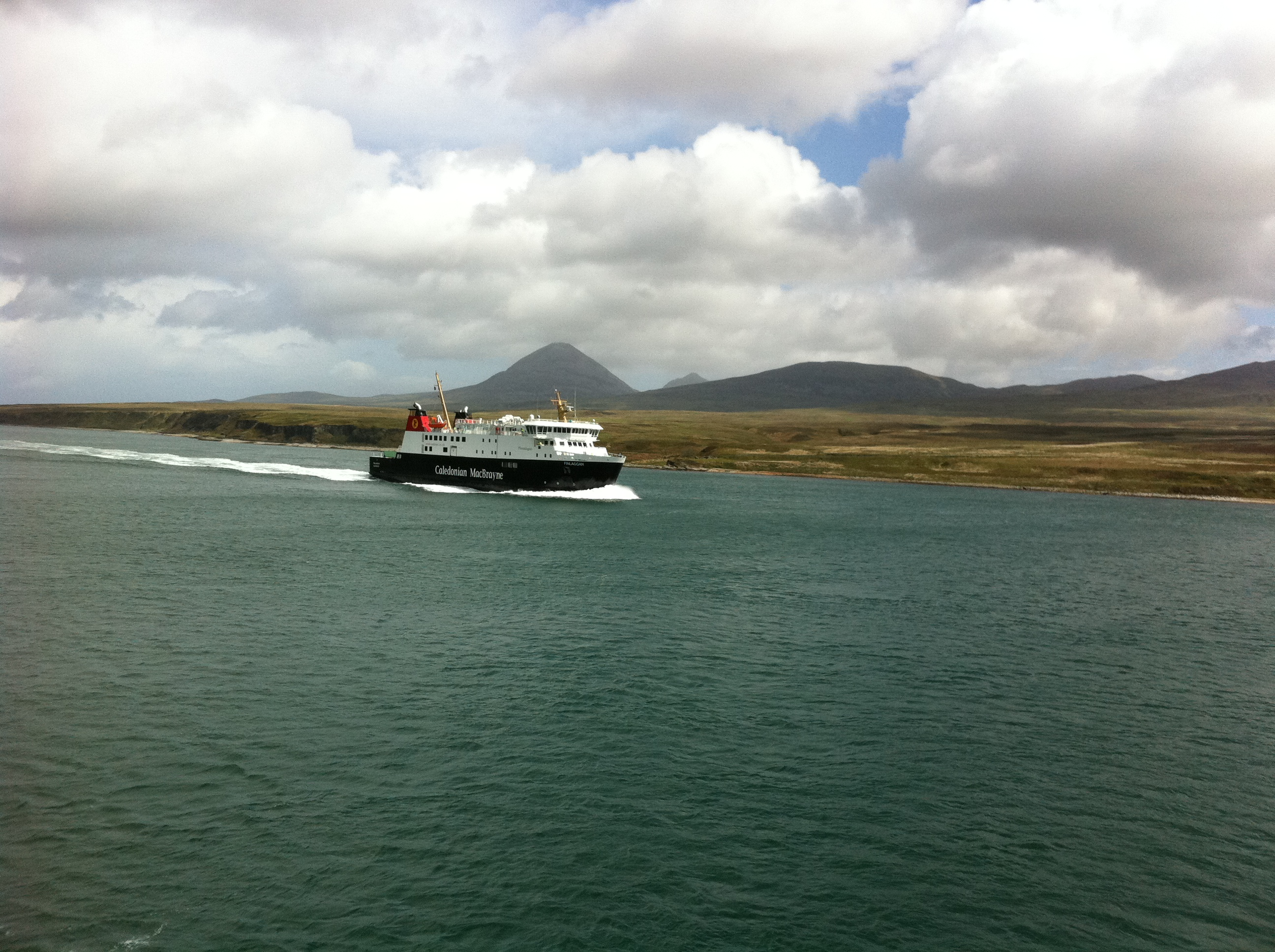
Finlaggan passing the Paps of Jura, May 2011

CMAL currently owns 38 ferries, of which 33 are operated by CalMac Ferries on routes to the islands and peninsulas of the west of Scotland. In April 2018 it was agreed that the five vessels operated by NorthLink Ferries on routes to the Orkney and Shetland islands would also join the fleet. Many ferries are specially built for the ports they serve yet are still interchangeable and able to serve different crossings and can carry from one to 143 cars. The total fleet value was estimated at £130m in 2017. The newest vessel in the fleet, MV Isle of Islay, was handed over to CMAL on 15 January 2026, travelled to Scotland via Gibraltar and the Bay of Biscay, and arrived at Inchgreen Quay, Greenock, on 22 February. She entered service on the Islay route on 31 March 2026.

=== Clyde and Hebrides Islands ferries (Caledonian MacBrayne) ===
- MV Argyle
- MV Bute
- MV Caledonian Isles
- MV Carvoria
- MV Catriona
- MV Clansman
- MV Coruisk
- MV Finlaggan
- MV Glen Sannox
- MV Hallaig
- MV Hebrides
- MV Isle of Arran
- MV Isle of Cumbrae
- MV Isle of Islay
- MV Isle of Lewis
- MV Isle of Mull
- MV Loch Alainn
- MV Loch Bhrusda
- MV Loch Buie
- MV Loch Dunvegan
- MV Loch Frisa
- MV Loch Fyne
- MV Loch Linnhe
- MV Loch Portain
- MV Loch Ranza
- MV Loch Riddon
- MV Loch Seaforth
- MV Loch Shira
- MV Loch Striven
- MV Loch Tarbert
- MV Lochinvar
- MV Lochnevis
- MV Lord of the Isles

=== Northern Isles ferries (NorthLink Ferries) ===
- MV Hamnavoe
- MV Hrossey
- MV Hjaltland
- MS Helliar
- MS Hildasay

=== Former vessels ===
MV Raasay and MV Eigg ceased operation with Caledonian MacBrayne in early 2018, and are now no longer part of the fleet. MV Hebridean Isles was withdrawn from service in November 2024, and spare parts which could be used for maintaining other vessels were removed for storage. On 27 October 2025, Hebridean Isles was taken under tow to Esbjerg in Denmark for final dismantling.

== Harbours ==
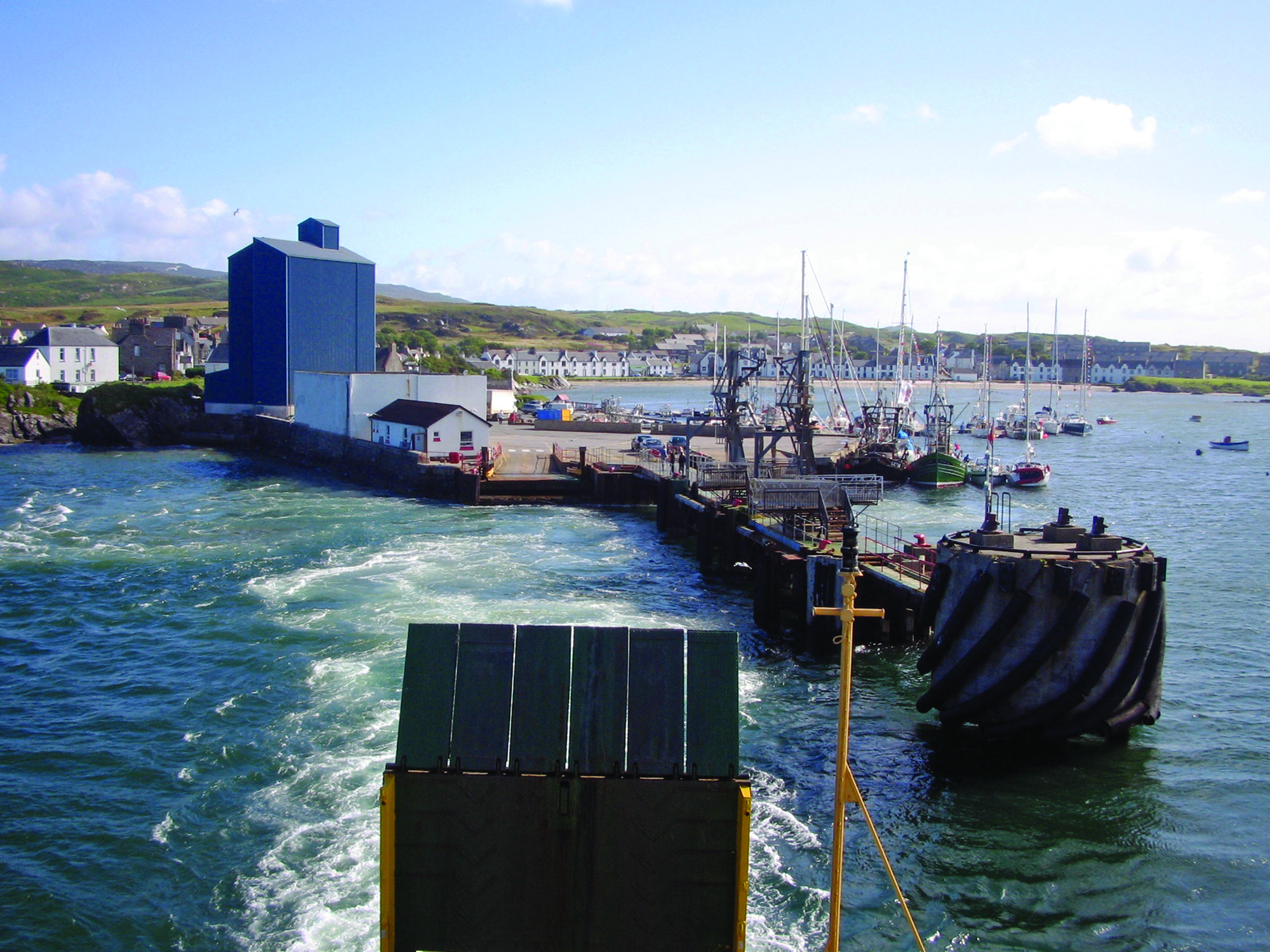
Port Ellen pier on Islay was officially opened by CMAL in August 2012

CMAL owns 17 ports and harbours, and additionally owns and leases properties and port infrastructure at 10 other locations associated with the delivery of Clyde and Hebrides Ferry Services.

- Ardrossan
- Arran: Brodick
- Arran: Lochranza
- Barra: Castlebay
- Bute: Rhubodach
- Claonaig
- Colintraive
- Coll: Arinagour
- Colonsay: Scalasaig
- Cumbrae: Tattie Pier
- Gallanach
- Gourock
- Harris: Tarbert
- Islay: Port Ellen
- Kennacraig
- Kerrera Berthing Structure
- Kilchoan
- Largs
- Lochaline
- Mull: Fishnish
- Mull: Tobermory
- Oban
- Portavadie
- Skye: Armadale
- South Uist: Lochboisdale
- Tiree: Gott Bay
- Wemyss Bay

As Statutory Harbour Authority for a number of these harbours, CMAL's responsibilities and duties include:

- A duty of care to all port users
- An obligation to conserve and promote the safe use of the harbours
- Responsibility for efficiency, economy and safety of operation, in respect of the services and facilities provided.

== Completed projects ==
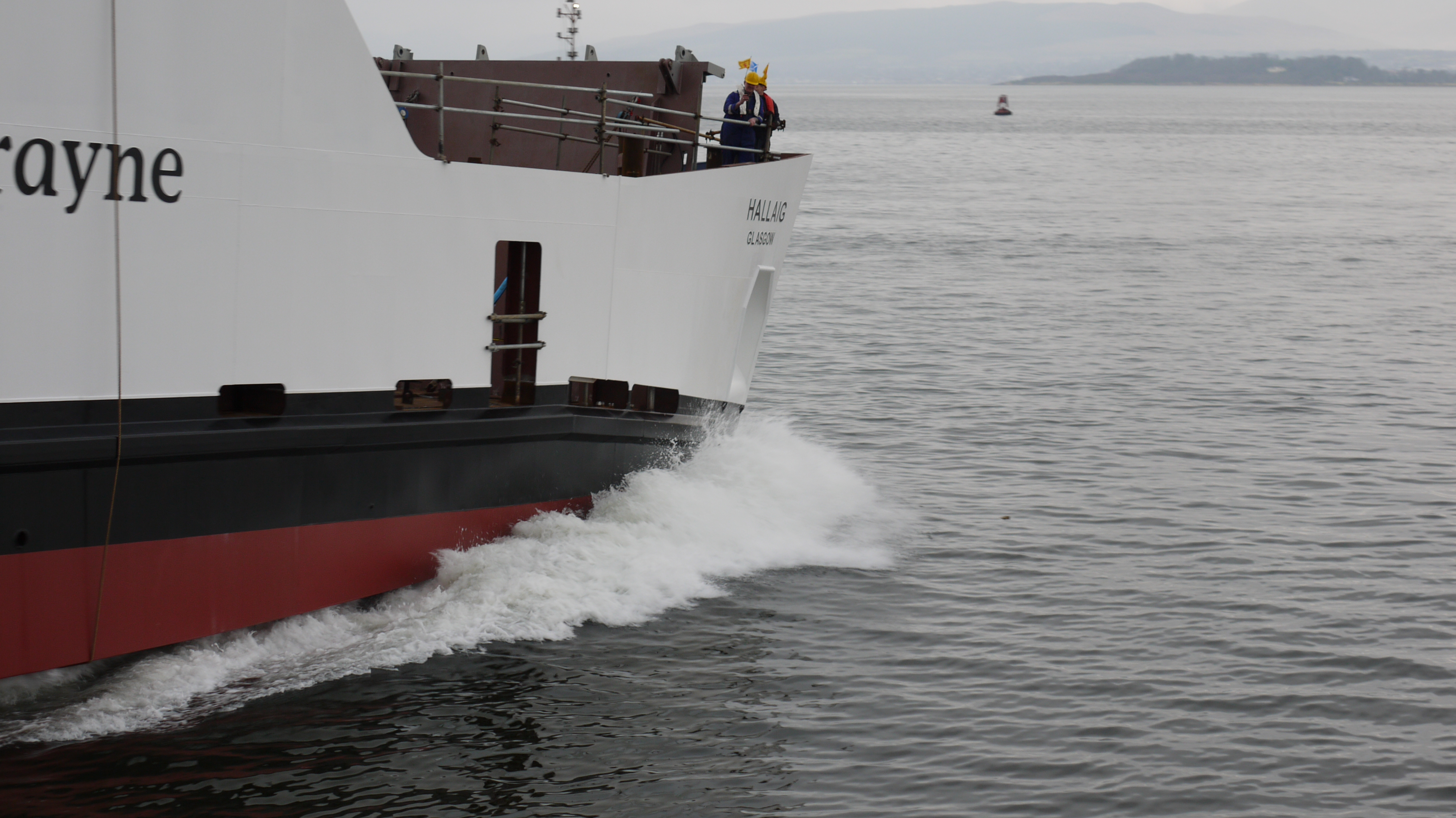
Launch of Hallaig hybrid ferry in December 2012

=== Hybrid ferries project ===
On 17 December 2012, the world's first seagoing roll-on/roll-off vehicle and passenger diesel–electric hybrid ferry was launched by CMAL on the Clyde. MV Hallaig incorporates a low-carbon hybrid system of diesel electric and lithium-ion battery power. The 135-tonne ferry is nearly 150 feet long and can accommodate 150 passengers, 23 cars or two heavy-goods vehicles. She began service between Sconser on Skye and Raasay in the summer of 2013. A second hybrid ferry, MV Lochinvar, was launched in May 2013 and initially operated on the Tarbert (Loch Fyne) - Portavadie route, currently operating on the Lochaline - Fishnish route. A third, to be named MV Catriona, was launched in spring 2016 and operates on the Claonaig - Lochranza route, additionally to Tarbert (Loch Fyne) and Portavadie in the winter.

=== Brodick terminal redevelopment ===
CMAL completed the redevelopment of Brodick ferry terminal. The redevelopment included an entirely new pier with linkspan and airbridge, a second berth with concrete ramp, a new two-storey terminal building with bus station and car marshalling space. The old linkspan was removed and the causeway transformed into an outdoor seating area.

=== Sustainable ferries study ===
CMAL was commissioned to carry out a feasibility study for Scottish Enterprise to evaluate the technical and commercial possibilities of using hydrogen fuel cells to enable the development of zero-emission ferries. Along with Orkney Islands Council, Ballard Power Systems, Kongsberg Maritime and others, CMAL were part of the HySeas III consortium hoping to demonstrate that fuel cells could be integrated with a marine hybrid electric drive system. The project hoped to develop a vessel to operate between Kirkwall and Shapinsay. The project was completed in June 2022.

=== New Islay ferries ===
This project was to replace MV Hebridean Isles and MV Finlaggan (to be cascaded elsewhere in the network). On 3 October 2022 the first steel was cut for the first vessel, named MV Isle of Islay, at Cemre Shipyard, Turkey. On the week of 13 January 2023 the first vessels' keel was laid and the second vessels' first steel was cut. Voting for the names of the two vessels was launched on 24 April 2023, where the public was asked to pick two names, with the following options:

- Isle of Islay—the southernmost island of the Inner Hebrides of Scotland.
- Pioneer—a ferry built in 1974 serving West Loch Tarbert and Port Ellen on Islay. She was the longest vessel to operate this far up the loch.
- Loch Gruinart—a sea loch on the north coast of Islay.
- Loch Indaal—a sea loch south of Loch Gruinart, and inspiration for the folk song “The Lights of Lochindaal” by Iain Simpson.
- Laggan Bay—home to ‘The Big Strand’, a five-mile-long beach, located on the southeast entrance to Loch Indaal.
- Machir Bay—a small bay on the west coast of Islay.

The names MV Isle of Islay and MV Loch Indaal were selected. On 24 May 2023 the keel for Loch Indaal was laid; she was subsequently launched on 8 June 2024. The vessels utilise Voith Schneider Propulsion and bow thrusters.

Isle of Islay was handed over to CMAL on 15 January 2026, and entered service on the Islay route on 31 March 2026. Loch Indaal was handed over to CMAL on 18 November 2026, and is now due to sail to Scotland, following which she will undertake crew familiarisation and berthing trials before entering service alongside her sister ship. Final delivery was some 18 months later than anticipated when the order for the two vessels was placed, with the shipyard blaming the impact of the war in Ukraine on steel supplies, Houthi attacks on vessels in the Red Sea, the 2023 Turkey–Syria earthquakes, a shortage of commissioning engineers, and snow and cold weather in Turkey.

Due to the size of the vessels, infrastructure upgrades including dredging, new quay walls, strengthening works, fendering upgrades, facilities for shore power were required at Kennacraig, Port Askaig and Colonsay. These works were completed in March 2025. Work on the second Islay port, Port Ellen, commenced in June 2026, with the port expected to be closed until 2029. During this period all sailings to Islay will operate via Port Askaig.

== Current projects ==
=== Dual-fuel ferries ===
In September 2015, it was announced that CMAL would order two ferries from Ferguson Marine Engineering (FMEL). The vessels will be able to operate on liquefied natural gas (LNG) and marine diesel, future-proofing them for tighter sulphur emissions regulations. They will be the largest commercial vessels to be built on the Clyde since 2001. The first, named MV Glen Sannox, was due to enter service at Ardrossan in 2018, with the second, named MV Glen Rosa, following a few months later. Both vessels have been delayed, with the shipyard going into administration in August 2019. The 'ferry fiasco' is an ongoing political scandal in Scotland, exposing management failures across all parties involved. The new vessels are too large to use the regular mainland port of Ardrossan, and therefore will be required to operate from Troon until upgrade works can be completed. On 18 March 2026 CMAL completed the purchase of Ardrossan harbour to allow these works to be undertaken.

MV Glen Sannox was handed over to CalMac on 21 November 2024, and entered revenue-earning service on the Troon to Brodick route on 12 January 2025. As of October 2026, the expected delivery date for MV Glen Rosa is February 2027, after numerous delays.

=== Ardrossan Harbour ===
It was originally planned to upgrade both Uig and Ardrossan for the dual-fuel vessels Glen Sannox and Glen Rosa. However following the decision to allocate both these vessels to the Arran route, only Ardrossan remained in scope for this project. Ardrossan harbour was taken into CMAL ownership on 18 March 2026. Work on upgrading Ardrossan to be able to accept both Glen Sannox and Glen Rosa is now planned to commence in later 2027 or early 2028. Works are expected to take nearly 2 years, meaning the two vessels will not be able to use Ardrossan until 2029. As of September 2026, CalMac plan for Glen Rosa to serve Arran via Troon, with Hebrides maintaining a service from Ardrossan.

=== Small vessel replacement programme ===
This project is to replace the oldest of the Loch class, in two phases over ten years. The new vessels would be more environmentally friendly and meet higher regulatory standards.

==== Phase 1 ====
The first phase will be for the building of seven new vessels for the following routes.

1. Colintraive – Rhubodach, replacing MV Loch Dunvegan
2. Sconser – Raasay, replacing MV Hallaig (to be cascaded, probably to Cumbrae, to replace MV Loch Riddon as second summer vessel, with a possibility for a higher passenger capacity)
3. Iona – Fionnphort, replacing MV Loch Buie
4. Tarbert (Loch Fyne) - Portavadie, replacing MV Isle of Cumbrae
5. Lochaline – Fishnish, replacing MV Lochinvar (to be cascaded elsewhere in the network)
6. Tobermory – Kilchoan, replacing MV Loch Tarbert
7. Tayinloan – Gigha, replacing MV Loch Ranza

The procurement process began in July 2024, and in March 2025 a contract for the seven vessels was awarded to Remontowa Shipbuilding of Gdańsk in Poland, with the first vessel expected to be delivered by 2027. The first steel was cut for the first of the vessels, to be named MV Loch Awe, in September 2025, and the vessel's keel was laid in December. December 2025 also saw the first steel being cut for the second vessel, to be named MV Loch Etive, and the names of the remaining five vessels (MV Loch Katrine, MV Loch Maree, MV Loch Morar, MV Loch Rannoch, and MV Loch Shiel) being revealed. As of August 2026, construction was underway for five of the seven vessels.

==== Phase 2 ====
The second phase of the small vessel replacement programme, covering ferries that undertake longer journeys or have port or sea constraints, began initial design and port feasibility studies in August 2024. The following routes are in scope for this phase:

1. Barra – Eriskay, replacing MV Loch Alainn
2. Berneray – Leverburgh, replacing MV Loch Portain

Replacement of MV Loch Fyne, which currently operates on the Mallaig – Armadale route alongside MV Coruisk, was in scope for Phase 2, however in September 2025 CMAL indicated that it was likely to move out of scope to become a standalone project due to the service requirements of this route. MV Loch Bhrusda, which currently serves as a relief vessel for the fleet, was also considered for replacement as part of Phase 2. On 3 March 2026 the Deputy First Minister Kate Forbes announced that 2 SVRP Phase 2 vessels would be ordered from Ferguson Marine via a direct award, without going out to tender. On 18 November 2026 CMAL's chief executive Kevin Hobb told MSPs that the CMAL board of directors were opposed to making a direct order, and would only place an order with Ferguson's on this basis if instructed to do so by the government.

=== New Little Minch ferries ===
This project is to replace MV Hebrides (to be cascaded elsewhere in the network) and split the routes in the summer, having one vessel going to Lochmaddy and the other to Tarbert, giving more resilience to the fleet and the Outer Hebrides. The two vessels will be of the same design as MV Isle of Islay and MV Loch Indaal. All four of these vessels will be built at the Cemre Shipyard in Turkey.

CMAL confirmed on 19 May 2023 that the first steel for the first vessel would be cut on 24 May 2023. On 20 September 2023, the keel was laid for the first vessel, while the first steel was cut for the second vessel. A public vote to select the names for the two vessels began on 30 November 2023, with voting closing at midnight on Monday 18 December. The names MV Claymore and MV Lochmor were selected. As with the new Islay vessels, it was announced in February 2025 that delivery, originally planned for 2025, would be delayed until 2026. As of September 2026, it was expected that Lochmor would be delivered in the first quarter of 2027, with Claymore following in the second quarter.

=== Northern Isles Freight Vessels ===
This project will replace two NorthLink freight vessels currently operating on the Aberdeen to Kirkwall/Lerwick route, with delivery expected during 2026. Although primarily designated as freight vessels, the vessels also include flexible passenger-carrying capacity to allow interoperability with passenger vessels during annual dry-docking periods. On 4 June 2025, funding was awarded by the Scottish Government for the replacement of these vessels and as a result the procurement process began. A contract for the two vessels was awarded to the Guangzhou Shipyard International in China in March 2026.

=== Gourock ferries and terminal redevelopment ===
Replacements for the three passenger-only fleet serving Dunoon and Kilcreggan. This project also includes the redevelopment of all three terminals and related infrastructure. This project is currently at the design phase, with construction due to begin in 2025/26.

=== New Lochboisdale ferry and Gasay Ferry Terminal ===
A new vessel will be constructed to replace MV Lord of the Isles on the Mallaig - Lochboisdale (South Uist) service. This also includes a new terminal at Gasay, near Lochboisdale, as the current pier is getting to the end of its life. This project is currently at the design phase, and as of February 2025 a date for procurement was still to be confirmed.

=== Future Mull ferries ===
The CMAL Corporate Plan for 2024-2027 envisages the start of the design phase for two new major units to replace MV Isle of Mull and MV Loch Frisa on the Oban-Craignure service. Initial concept work commenced in December 2025. The intention is to build two identical vessels capable of carrying approximately 60 cars and 450 passengers each.

== Criticism and future ==
CMAL has come under significant criticism for its handling of procurement, particularly in relation to the building programme of MV Glen Sannox and MV Glen Rosa, both under construction at Ferguson Shipyard in Port Glasgow. The function and future of CMAL is currently under consideration by the Scottish Government via Project Neptune which is considering the management and delivery of Scottish ferry services. The future of CMAL is subject to a number of proposals being made including re-merging CMAL and Caledonian MacBrayne as was the case previously or indeed CMAL being absorbed into the function of Transport Scotland. A Scottish Parliament committee was critical of CMAL and ultimately has considered the proposals outlined in Project Neptune, recommending CMAL be abolished and a new public division of Transport Scotland established called Ferries Scotland. There have been numerous calls such as that from Kenny MacLeod, Chairman of Harris Development Trust, to scrap CMAL and reintegrate the organisation as an internal organ of Caledonian MacBrayne.
