= MV Eigg =

Scottish ferry built in 1975

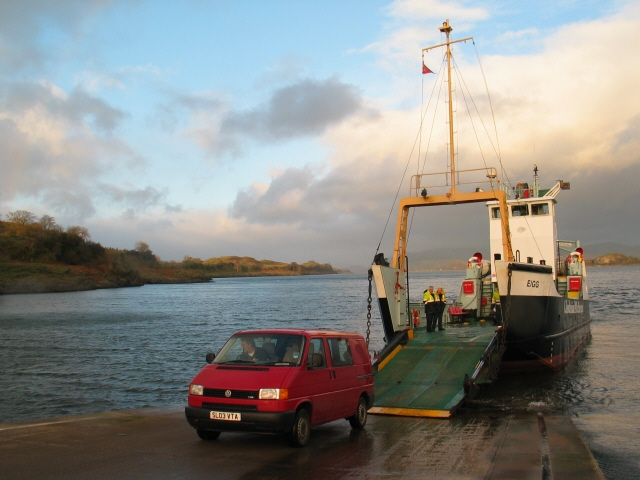
- MV Eigg loading at Achnacriosh, Lismore

History

United Kingdom & Ireland
- Name: MV Eigg; Scottish Gaelic: Eilean Eige
- Namesake: Eigg
- Owner: Clare Island Ferry Co.
- Operator: 1974–2018: Caledonian MacBrayne; 2018: Clare Island Ferry Co.
- Port of registry: Glasgow
- Route: Roonagh–Clare Island
- Builder: James Lamont & Co, Port Glasgow; Engines by: English Electric Diesels; Re-engined at Timbacraft, Shandon
- Yard number: 423
- Launched: 12 December 1974
- In service: 25 February 1975
- Out of service: April 2018 (CalMac)
- Identification: IMO number: 7340411; Callsign: 2GFZ; MMSI number: 232003365
- Status: in service

General characteristics
- Type: Landing craft
- Tonnage: 69 GT
- Length: 22.5 m (73 ft 10 in)
- Beam: 6.4 m (21 ft 0 in)
- Draught: 1.4 m (4 ft 7 in)
- Installed power: (originally) Twin diesel 2 × M6cy 150 bhp (110 kW) each; (currently) 2 × Scania D9 93M35 9 litre turbocharged 6 cyl diesels each rated at 257 hp (192 kW) at 1900 rpm.
- Propulsion: Twin screw
- Speed: 8 kn (15 km/h)
- Capacity: 5 cars and 75 passengers
- Crew: 3

MV Eigg is a landing craft car ferry built for Caledonian MacBrayne in 1974. She was owned by Caledonian Maritime Assets Limited and operated mostly on the Oban to Lismore route from 1976 until 2013. She was the oldest vessel in the CalMac fleet at her retirement in April 2018. As of June 2018, she is based at Clare Island in County Mayo.

== History ==
MV Eigg was the sixth Island Class ferry built for Caledonian MacBrayne.

== Layout ==
The eight Island Class ferries, built between 1972 and 1976, were a very simple design, based on World War II landing craft. They had a two-part folding ramp at the bow, an open plan car deck incorporating a small turntable immediately aft and a sheltered area of passenger accommodation at the stern. The wheelhouse was above the passenger accommodation and the main mast above the ramp at the bow. A radar mast sat on top of the bridge, just forward of the small funnel and engine exhaust.

In 1999 MV Eigg's wheelhouse was raised to provide an unobstructed view. Later that year, she was given the livery of the rest of the fleet, with a black hull, becoming the most easily identified Island Class ship.

== Service ==
MV Eigg entered service in 1975, on the Raasay crossing from Portree on Skye, bringing vehicle capability to the route. Replaced by her sister, MV Canna in January 1976, Eigg began her career as the Lismore ferry.

In 1996, Eigg became the Kilchoan ferry (from Tobermory on Mull). She had a IIA passenger certificate and, when required, was able to provide livestock runs between Mallaig and the Small Isles. Her relief vessel was MV Bruernish or MV Coll. In 1999, she once again became the dedicated Lismore vessel. Eigg has also seen service on relief at Jura on charter for Argyll and Bute Council.

In 2013, following the entry to service of MV Hallaig at Raasay, Eigg was replaced on the Lismore service by MV Loch Riddon. Despite her replacement, Eigg was given another annual overhaul and passenger certificate in March 2014 and remained spare at Oban. In 2015, Eigg moved to the James Watt Dock marina, Greenock and remained there, sometimes taking a sail around the Greenock area.

In 2017, Eigg was moved to Sandbank and was put up for sale in December 2017. She had one more survey in Corpach in March 2018. She was returned to owner, CMAL and was expected to be sold to new owners on the west coast of Ireland. On the 30th of June 2018, she arrived at Clare Island to take up service there, alongside her sister MV Clew Bay Queen.

Later in 2018 she was sold to new owners Clare Island Ferry Co. of Ireland, and as of December 2020 she is available for hire or bare boat charter. She can be employed for cargo, RORO passenger, work platform, marine construction, dive support, survey works, anchor handling and fish farm works.
