= MV Canna =

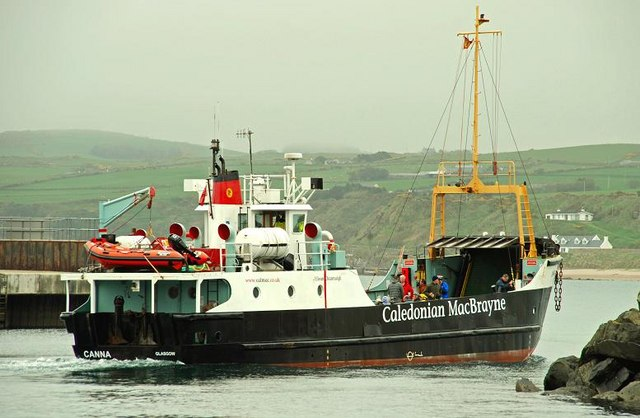
- MV Canna at Ballycastle

History

United Kingdom
- Name: MV Canna
- Namesake: Canna
- Owner: until 2017: Caledonian Maritime Assets
- Port of registry: Glasgow
- Builder: James Lamont & Co, Port Glasgow
- Yard number: 424
- Laid down: 1975
- Launched: 31 October 1975
- In service: 29 January 1976
- Identification: IMO number: 7340423; Callsign: 21AE (Rathlin)
- Status: in service

General characteristics
- Tonnage: Gross tonnage: 69
- Length: 22.5 m (73.8 ft)
- Beam: 6.4 m (21.0 ft)
- Draught: 1.4 m (4.6 ft)
- Installed power: (as built) 2 x Bergius Kelvin RS.6 6-Cyl engines (2000) 2 x Scania D9 93M35 turbocharged six-cylinder diesel engines rated at 257 hp at 1,900 rpm
- Speed: 8 knots
- Capacity: 140 passengers (27 winter) and six cars
- Crew: 3

MV Canna is a car ferry built for Caledonian MacBrayne (CalMac) in 1975. She spent 21 years in various locations on the west of Scotland and 20 years at Rathlin Island, Northern Island, before moving to Arranmore.

== History ==
MV Canna was the seventh of eight Island-class ferries built for Caledonian MacBrayne.

In November 2000, she was re-engined at Timbacraft, Shandon. In May 2009, MV Canna became the first Caledonian Maritime Assets Ltd ship to receive its Inventory of Hazardous Materials (green passport).

== Layout ==
The eight Island-class ferries, built between 1972 and 1976, were a very simple design, based on World War II landing craft. They had a two-part folding ramp at the bow, an open-plan car deck incorporating a small turntable immediately aft, and a sheltered area of passenger accommodation at the stern. The wheelhouse was above the passenger accommodation, and the main mast was above the ramp at the bow. A radar mast sat atop the bridge, just forward of the small funnel and engine exhaust.

== Service ==
MV Canna entered service with CalMac on the Raasay route in January 1976, initially from Portree, but this soon changed to a shorter crossing from Sconser. After only 3 months, she was moved to the Lochaline crossing to Mull, where she remained for the next 10 years. In 1986, MV Loch Linnhe and then the larger MV Isle of Cumbrae replaced Canna. After two years as spare vessel, Canna spent seven years crossing between Kyles Scalpay on Harris and the slipway on Scalpay - a crossing of just three minutes.

In April 1997, she took over the Ballycastle - Rathlin Island crossing in Northern Ireland, replacing MV Bruernish. She was operated by CalMac until 2008, when Rathlin Island Ferry Ltd took over the service, leasing the vessel from Caledonian Maritime Assets. After 20 years, in 2017, Canna was replaced by a new vessel, Spirit of Rathlin. Her future became uncertain and she was laid up at Burtonport, alongside her sisters, MV Rhum and MV Morvern.

She was bought for service at Arranmore in County Donegal, Ireland, before April 2018. By January 2020, she had been upgraded for the Arranmore service along with fellow Island-class ferries, Rhum, MV Coll, and Morvern.
