= MV Rhum =

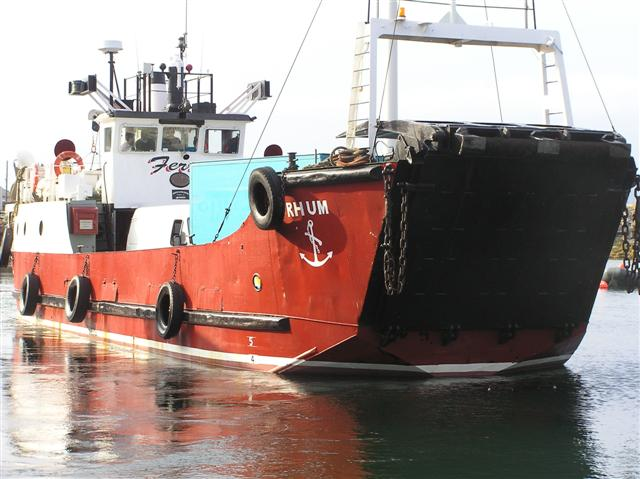
- MV Rhum as Arranmore ferry

History

United Kingdom & Ireland
- Name: MV Rhum
- Namesake: Rùm
- Operator: 1973: Caledonian MacBrayne, Gourock; 1998: Arranmore Ireland Ferry Services, Sligo
- Port of registry: Glasgow; 1998: Sligo Port
- Route: Claonaig - Lochranza; and relief; 1998: Arranmore ferry
- Builder: James Lamont & Co, Port Glasgow; Engines by: English Electric Diesels
- Yard number: 422
- Launched: 23 May 1973
- In service: 5 November 1973
- Out of service: 15 January 1998
- Identification: IMO number: 7319589
- Status: in service

General characteristics
- Tonnage: 69 GRT
- Length: 25.23 m (82.8 ft)
- Beam: 6.66 m (21.9 ft)
- Draught: 1.36 m (4.5 ft)
- Installed power: Twin diesel 2 x 4SCSA 6-cylinder engines, each 150 bhp
- Propulsion: Twin screw via reverse reduction gearboxes
- Speed: 9 knots
- Capacity: 7 cars and 164 passengers
- Crew: 3

MV Rhum is a car ferry built for Caledonian MacBrayne in 1974. Until 1987, she operated the seasonal Lochranza crossing to Arran. Since 1998, she has been one of the Arranmore ferries in County Donegal.

== History ==
MV Rhum was the fourth Island Class ferry built for Caledonian MacBrayne. The class gave good service, but, overtaken by demand, were replaced by Loch class vessels. In 1998, Rhum and MV Coll were sold to Mr Cornelius Bonner, who had previously bought Kilbrannan and Morvern. They left Campbeltown for Ireland on Friday 17 April 1998.

== Layout ==
The eight Island Class ferries, built between 1972 and 1976, were a very simple design, based on World War II landing craft. They had a two-part folding ramp at the bow, an open plan car deck incorporating a small turntable immediately aft and a sheltered area of passenger accommodation at the stern. The wheelhouse was above the passenger accommodation and the main mast above the ramp at the bow. A radar mast sat on top of the bridge, just forward of the small funnel and engine exhaust.

== Service ==
After launch, MV Rhum ran trials on the Clyde, providing some crossings at Largs on 22 June. She entered service on 28 June on the seasonal crossing of the Kilbrannan Sound, between Claonaig, Kintyre and Lochranza on Arran. She became the permanent vessel there, replacing her smaller sister, MV Kilbrannan. Each winter, Rhum relieved around the network.

When MV Loch Ranza arrived at Lochranza in 1987, Rhum became spare. She saw very varied service including at Iona (along with the regular MV Morvern), at Feolin (relieving Western Ferries' MV Sound of Gigha) and at Eriskay (relieving the Comhairle nan Eilean Siar ferry MV Eilean Na H-Oige). She also carried out charters to Carradale and to Ailsa Craig.

In 1994, Rhum inaugurated the Tarbert - Portavadie crossing. She proved a great success, carrying 3,500 vehicles and 15,000 passengers in her first two months and extending the season 2 weeks beyond the planned close. Plans to continue the service through the winter, were blocked by refusal of a berth in the inner harbour at Tarbert. Continued success in summer saw Rhum replaced by the larger MV Loch Striven in November 1995 and October 1996.

Her final permanent station with CalMac was on the Scalpay crossing, where she closed the service in December 1997, with the opening of a new bridge. She spent her last few weeks on the Oban - Lismore service.

Her new Irish owner operates Rhum and Coll between Burtonport and Arranmore in County Donegal.
