= MV Loch Dunvegan =

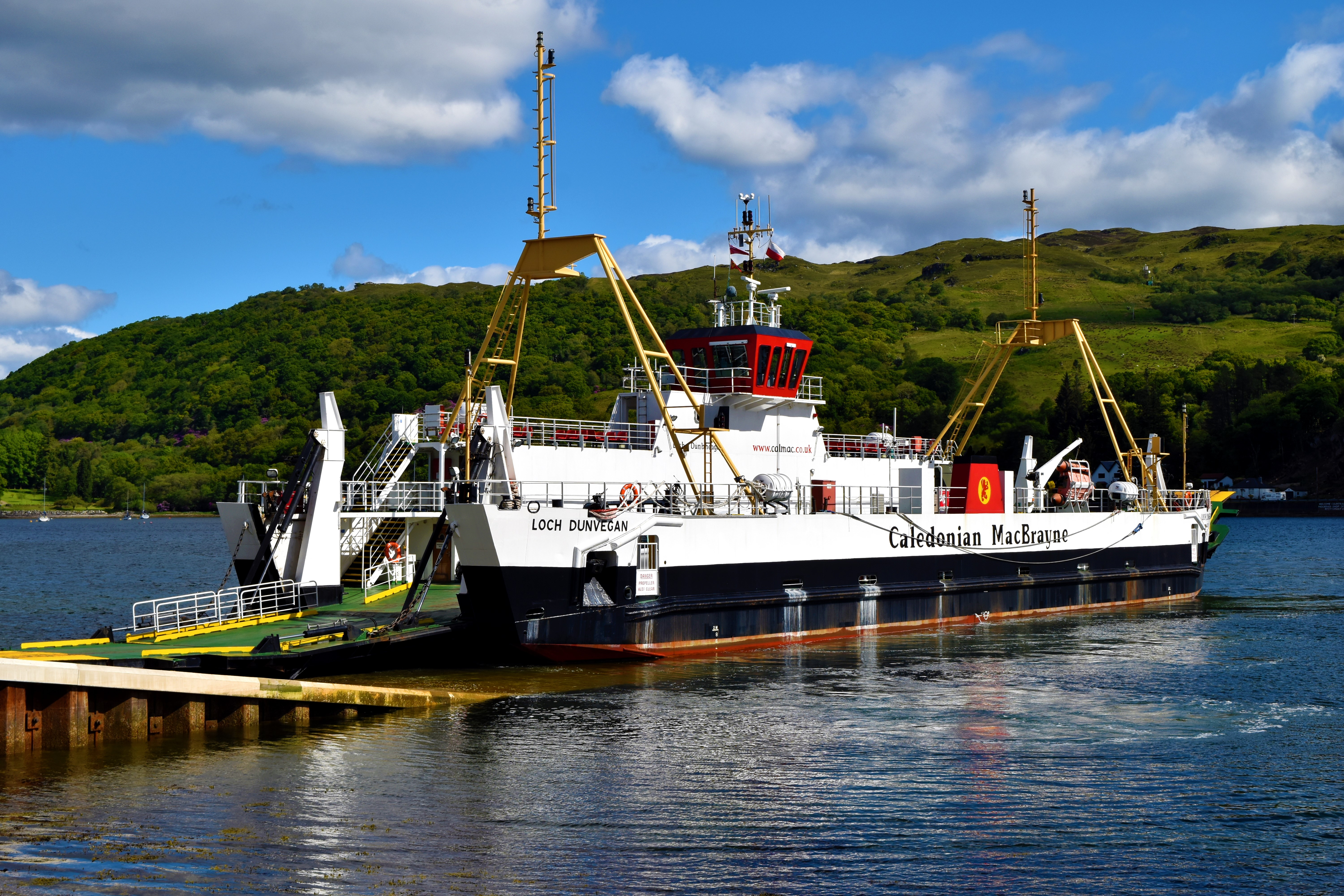
- Berthed at Rhubodach slip, May 2019

History

United Kingdom
- Name: MV Loch Dunvegan; Scottish Gaelic: Loch Dùnbheagan
- Namesake: A sea loch on the north east of Skye
- Owner: Caledonian Maritime Assets Limited
- Operator: Caledonian MacBrayne
- Port of registry: Glasgow
- Route: 1991 – 1995: Kyle of Lochalsh; since 1999: Colintraive to Rhubodach
- Builder: Ferguson Shipbuilders, Port Glasgow
- Yard number: 601
- Launched: 15 March 1991
- In service: 13 May 1991
- Identification: IMO number: 9006409; Callsign: MNFE3; MMSI Number: 232003165
- Status: In service

General characteristics
- Tonnage: 549 GT; 224 DWT
- Length: 54.2 m (177 ft 10 in); 73.8 m (242 ft 2 in) overall
- Beam: 13.4 m (44 ft 0 in)
- Draught: 1.6 m (5 ft 3 in)
- Installed power: 2 × TAMD 162 4SCSA oil engines, 334 kW (448 bhp) each
- Propulsion: Voith Schneider propulsion units
- Speed: 9 kn (17 km/h)
- Capacity: 200 passengers and 36 cars
- Crew: 4

MV Loch Dunvegan is a Caledonian Maritime Assets Limited car ferry built for the Isle of Skye crossing and now operating in the Kyles of Bute, Argyll and Bute, Scotland. She is operated by Caledonian MacBrayne (CalMac).

== History ==
Loch Dunvegan entered service at Kyle of Lochalsh on 13 May 1991, displacing MV Lochalsh. Even at this time, it was known that the Skye Bridge was coming. On 16 October 1995, Loch Dunvegan and Loch Fyne, dressed with flags, gave the last-ever car ferry runs across this narrow stretch of water. Loch Dunvegan was laid up in James Watt Dock at Greenock for two years. No sale was completed, and in 1997 CalMac prepared the vessels for service once more. In August, Loch Dunvegan went to relieve the new MV Loch Alainn, which had suffered a major breakdown at Lochaline on the Sound of Mull. Breaking down herself, she was relieved on 27 September 1997 by Loch Fyne, which went on to become the permanent vessel on Mull's secondary crossing. Since 1999, Loch Dunvegan has been the main vessel on the five-minute run from Colintraive to Rhubodach.

This is the third Loch Dunvegan that has operated for CalMac and MacBrayne's. The first was a 1891 Caird & Company, Greenock built screw steamer as SS Grouse, bought in 1929 and scrapped in 1948 at Faslane. The second was a 1946 Akt. Lindholmens Varv, Gothenburg built motor vessel, bought in 1950 and sold in 1973. She was the first CalMac ship to have a controllable pitch propeller. MV Loch Dunvegan (II) was last seen as an accommodation ship in Bristol Floating Harbour in the 2000s.

== Layout ==
Loch Dunvegan and her twin sister, MV Loch Fyne, both built for the Skye route, were loosely based on the earlier MV Loch Striven. Passenger accommodation along the starboard side of the hull can cater for up to 250 persons, with lounges on two levels and an open deck above. The car deck has four lanes and can take 36 cars. The high sided design is prone to being caught by the wind. She initially had very wide ramps at both ends. Initially lengthened to reduce the risk of long vehicles grounding, these have been replaced by narrower and lighter ramps.

== Service ==
Loch Dunvegan and MV Loch Fyne provided a 24-hour service between Kyle of Lochalsh and Kyleakin on Skye until 1995. Two years layup followed, after which Loch Dunvegan was employed on relief duties, seeing service at Mallaig, Fishnish (relieving her sister) and providing a passenger-only service on the Wemyss Bay–Rothesay route. In July 1998, she provided an emergency service between Portavadie and Tarbert while the main Kintyre road was closed due to a landslide.

In early 1999, Loch Dunvegan took over from MV Isle of Cumbrae on the secondary Bute crossing, from Colintraive to Rhubodach. Due to her size relative to the short crossing of 450 yards (410 m) she normally sails with both ramps unfolded.
