= MV Sailor =

Ferry operating in Great Britain

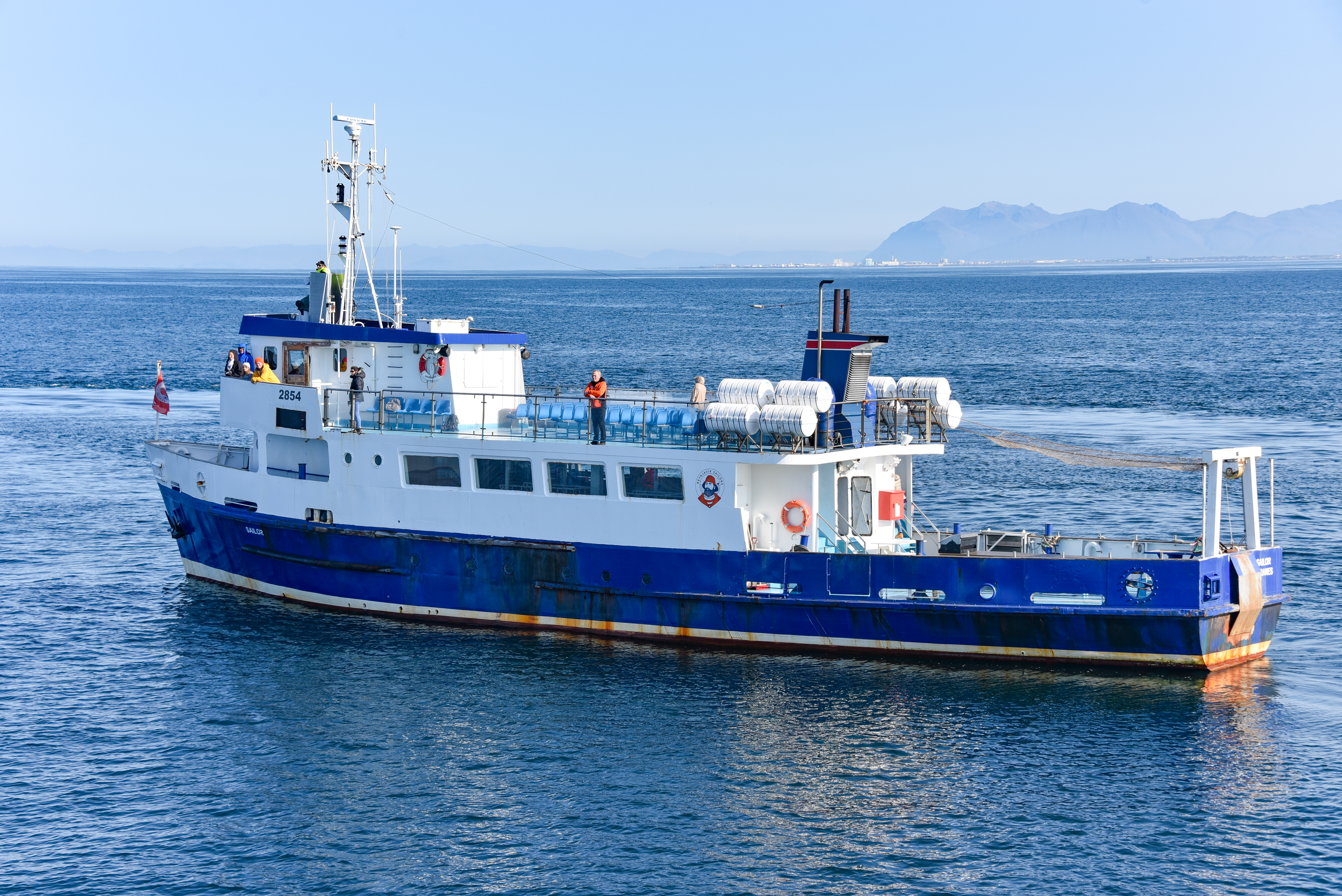
- Whale watching tour boat - MV Sailor

History

→
- Name: 1979–2001: Lochmor; 2001–2002: Lochawe; 2002–2009: Torbay Belle; 2009–2014: Jurassic Scene; 2014–2015: Gullfoss; since 2017: Sailor
- Namesake: earlier Outer Isles mail steamer
- Owner: 1979–2001: Caledonian MacBrayne; 2001–2002: Landwest Shipping Corporation Ltd/Argyll Group plc (Argyll); 2002–2009: Brixham Belle Cruises (Paignton); 2009–2014: Blue Line Cruises (Poole); since 2015: Reykjavik Sailors (Reykjavík)
- Port of registry: Glasgow/Brixham; –2014: Poole, United Kingdom; 2014: Akranes, Iceland
- Route: Mallaig to Small Isles
- Builder: Ailsa Shipbuilding Company, Troon; Engines: Volvo Penta, Sweden
- Yard number: 554
- Launched: 11 June 1979
- In service: July 1979
- Out of service: 2001
- Identification: Call sign: GYOR → TFGX; IMO number: 7811240; MMSI number: 251362110
- Status: in service

General characteristics
- Tonnage: 189 GRT; 51 t DWT
- Length: 30.98 m (101 ft 8 in)
- Beam: 8.01 m (26 ft 3 in)
- Draught: 1.7 m (5 ft 7 in)
- Installed power: Twin diesel 2 × M6cy 4SA 382 kW (512 bhp)
- Propulsion: Twin-screw
- Speed: 10 kn (19 km/h)
- Capacity: 130 passengers
- Crew: 6

MV Sailor is a whale watching boat, operating tours out of Reykjavík. She was built for Caledonian MacBrayne as MV Lochmor II, a ferry serving the Small Isles from 1979 until 2001. From 2009, she operated cruises from Poole as MV Jurassic Scene.

== History ==
Ailsa Shipbuilders of Troon won a tender in 1978 for an 84-foot (26-metre) vessel to replace the converted minesweeper, MV Loch Arkaig which served the Small Isles for 15 years. Before building, the specification was increased to 102 feet (31 metres).

== Layout ==
MV Lochmor had a raised main deck that was open at the stern for cargo. When required, there was space for two cars. Cargo loading was aided by a starboard crane. Forward, there were two passenger saloons on the lower deck, with the bridge on an upper deck. A landing platform, above the bridge, was used at the extreme low water found at Mallaig.

The superstructure has subsequently been extended back to surround the funnel.

== Service ==
MV Lochmor's predecessor, Loch Arkaig sank at her berth in Mallaig in March 1979. Her place was taken by MV Arran until MV Lochmor entered service on 18 July.

From Mallaig, MV Lochmor served the islands of Rùm, Eigg, Muck and Canna, as well as Armadale, Skye and Kyle of Lochalsh. She also gave cruises to Loch Duich, the Crowlin Islands and Portree. Of the Small Isles, only Canna had a pier that she could go alongside. On the other islands a ferry boat met the main ferry.

In 2001 MV Lochmor (technically “Lochmor II”) was replaced by MV Lochnevis. She was sold to Landwest Corp Ltd, Argyll and renamed MV Loch Awe. During this period of ownership by Landwest, the ship was maintained, certificated and crewed by Landwest Corporation's sister company Argyll Ferries Ltd.

From 2003 she operated as MV Torbay Belle for Brixham Belle Cruises of Paignton. In 2009 she was sold to Blue Line Cruises of Poole and renamed MV Jurassic Scene. She then operated cruises on the south coast of England, from Poole.

Since 2015, the ship has operated whale watching tours out of Reykjavík. As of 2017 the vessel's name is MV Sailor.
