= MV Lochnevis =

Ferry of CalMac Ferries

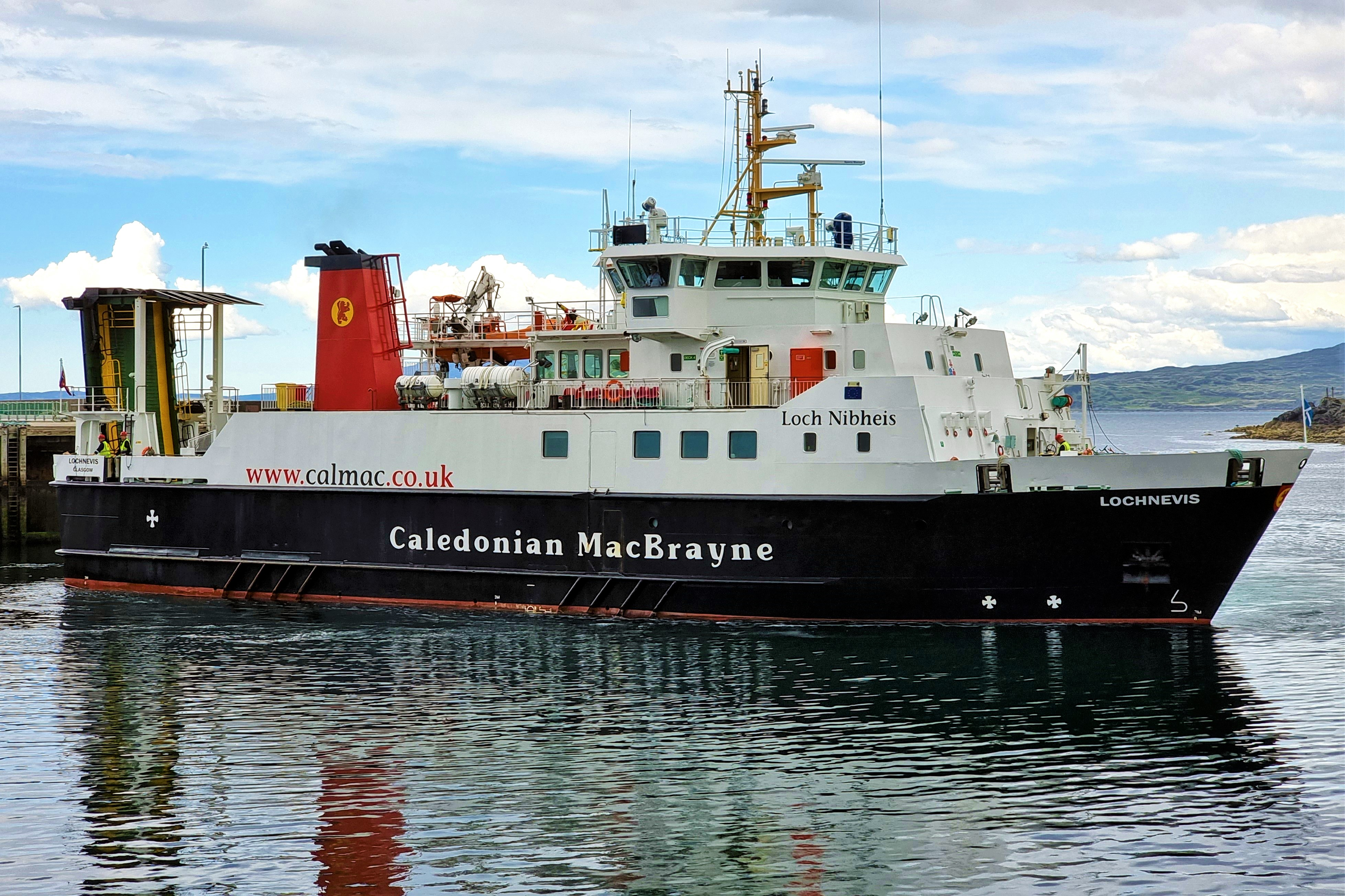
- At Mallaig, June 2022.

History

United Kingdom
- Name: Lochnevis; Scottish Gaelic: Loch Nibheis
- Namesake: Loch Nevis
- Owner: Caledonian Maritime Assets
- Operator: Caledonian MacBrayne
- Port of registry: Glasgow
- Route: Mallaig - Small Isles; Mallaig - Armadale (winter)
- Builder: Ailsa Shipbuilding Company, Troon
- Cost: £5,500,000
- Launched: 8 May 2000
- In service: 1 November 2001
- Identification: IMO number: 9209063; Callsign: ZQGW3; MMSI Number: 235000141
- Status: in service

General characteristics
- Class & type: Roll-on/roll-off vehicle ferry
- Tonnage: 941 GT
- Length: 49 m (160.8 ft)
- Beam: 11.4 m (37.4 ft)
- Installed power: Cummins KTA-38-M2 vee type
- Propulsion: Machinery: 3 × 12-cyl. 4 S.C.S.A. (159 mm × 159 mm (6.3 in × 6.3 in)) reduction geared to three directional twin propeller units. 3,039 bhp (2,266 kW) (total power). Two athwartship thrust propellers forward.
- Speed: 13 knots (24 km/h; 15 mph)
- Capacity: 190 passengers and 14 cars

MV Lochnevis (Scottish Gaelic: Loch Nibheis) is a ferry launched in 2000 and operated by Caledonian MacBrayne, serving the Small Isles of Scotland.

== History ==
Lochnevis was launched by Rev. Alan Lamb at Ailsa Shipbuilding, Troon on 6 May 2000, and entered service on 1 November 2001.

== Layout ==
Lochnevis' appearance is dominated by a large stern vehicle ramp. This allows her to berth a considerable distance from a slipway, protecting her exposed Azimuth thrusters in shallow waters. She can carry 190 passengers and 14 cars, although due to vehicle restrictions on the Small Isles, she usually carries few vehicles. The car deck is also used for goods for the islands. The starboard gangway entrance is used at Canna.

Forward of the car deck is crew accommodation, with the cafeteria, serving area, and galley above. On the next deck, the observation lounge has seating arranged diagonally. Officers' accommodation lies forward of the lounge, while heavy side doors lead to the open deck.

Passengers can enjoy the view ahead from an open bow – a rarity on current ferries. Aft of the lounge is outside seating, again laid out in a diagonal arrangement. Further aft are the fast rescue craft (port) and a single funnel and the hydraulic goods crane (starboard).

== Service ==
Lochnevis replaced the 20-year-old Lochmor on the Small Isles service. She serves the islands of Eigg, Canna, Rùm and Muck from Mallaig, taking 7 hours for a round of the four islands, compared with ten hours by her predecessor. Initially, Lochnevis, like Lochmor, at islands apart from Canna, was met by a ferry boat. In the years following her introduction, new piers and slipways have been built on all the islands, allowing Lochnevis to berth stern-to.

During the winter, Lochnevis adds the Mallaig – Armadale roster. In the early years, she was relieved by MV Pioneer, but since that vessel's sale, MV Raasay, MV Loch Bhrusda and various charter boats have been used.

On 2 September 2024, Lochnevis departed for her scheduled annual overhaul period, she was relieved by MV Loch Bhrusda with chartered vessels MV Sheerwater & MV Larven operating a passenger only service. Lochnevis was scheduled to return from her overhaul on 21 September, however this was delayed twice due to additional repairs being required. She returned to service on 13 October.
