= MV Loch Ranza =

Scottish ferry built in 1987

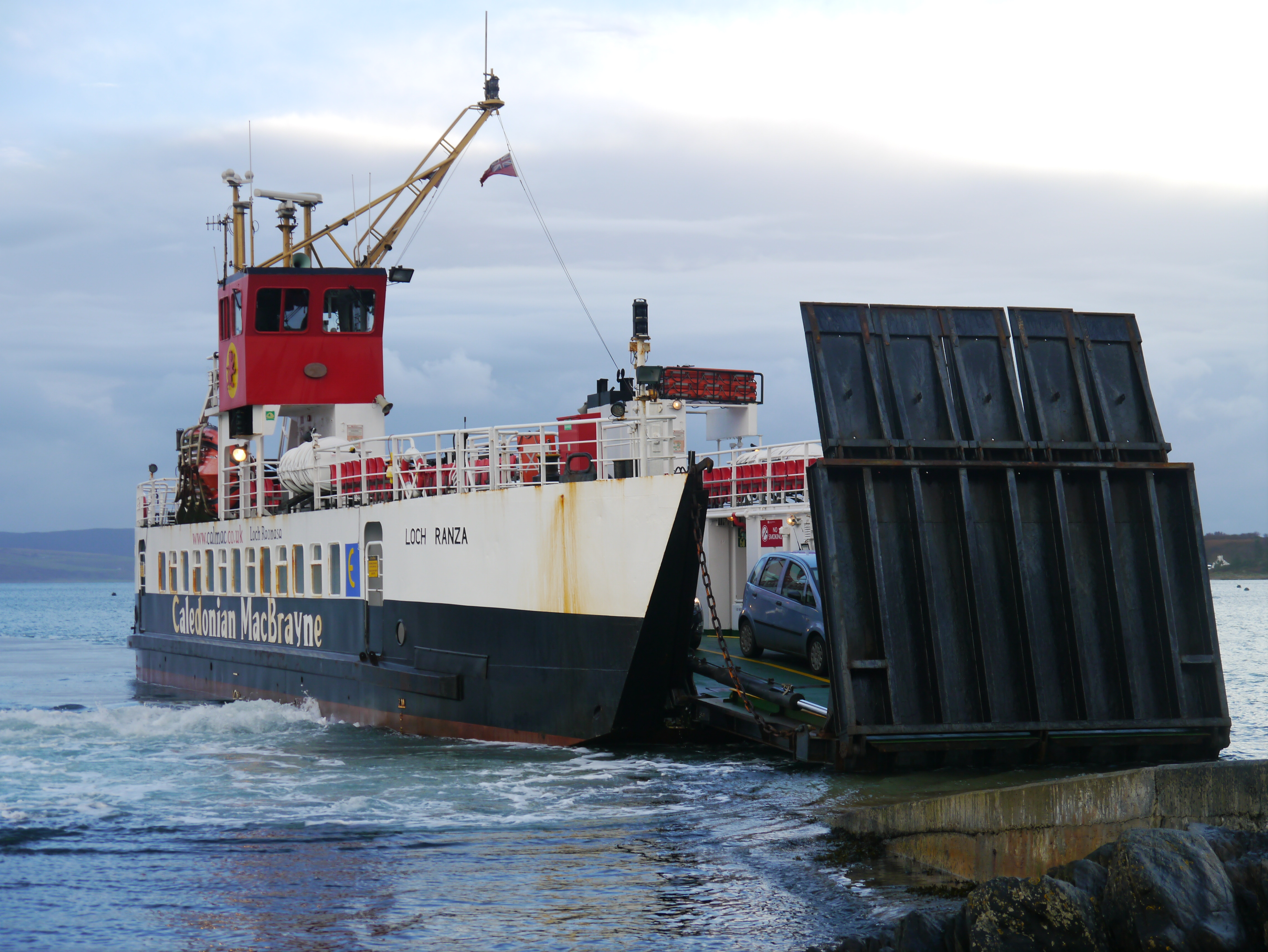
- MV Loch Ranza arriving at Gigha

History

United Kingdom
- Name: MV Loch Ranza; Scottish Gaelic: Loch Raonasa
- Namesake: Lochranza
- Owner: Caledonian Maritime Assets Limited
- Operator: Caledonian MacBrayne
- Port of registry: Glasgow
- Route: Tayinloan–Gigha
- Builder: R. Dunston, Hessle, East Riding of Yorkshire
- Yard number: H955
- Launched: 17 December 1986
- In service: 16 April 1987
- Identification: IMO number: 8519887; Callsign: GJGJ; MMSI Number: 232003370
- Status: in service

General characteristics
- Class & type: ro-ro vehicle ferry
- Tonnage: 206 GT; 65 DWT
- Length: 30.2 m (99 ft 1 in)
- Beam: 10 m (32 ft 10 in)
- Draught: 1.5 m (4 ft 11 in)
- Installed power: 6-cyl Volvo Penta
- Propulsion: 2 × Voith Schneider Propellers
- Speed: 9 kn (17 km/h)
- Capacity: 199 passengers and 9 cars
- Crew: 3

MV Loch Ranza (Scottish Gaelic: Loch Raonasa) is a Caledonian Maritime Assets Limited ro-ro car ferry, operated by Caledonian MacBrayne, serving the island of Gigha.

== History ==
MV Loch Ranza was the last of four drive-through ferries built in the 1980s by Dunston's of Hessle, to cope with increasing traffic on CalMac's smaller routes.

== Layout ==
The four vessels were based on the design of MV Isle of Cumbrae. They had a second passenger lounge, on the port side, reducing the capacity of the car deck.

== Service ==
MV Loch Ranza replaced MV Rhum on the Lochranza–Claonaig crossing in April 1987. After only five years, she was replaced by the larger MV Loch Tarbert. Loch Ranza moved to the Tayinloan–Gigha crossing in July 1992, where she has remained since.
