= MV Lochinvar =

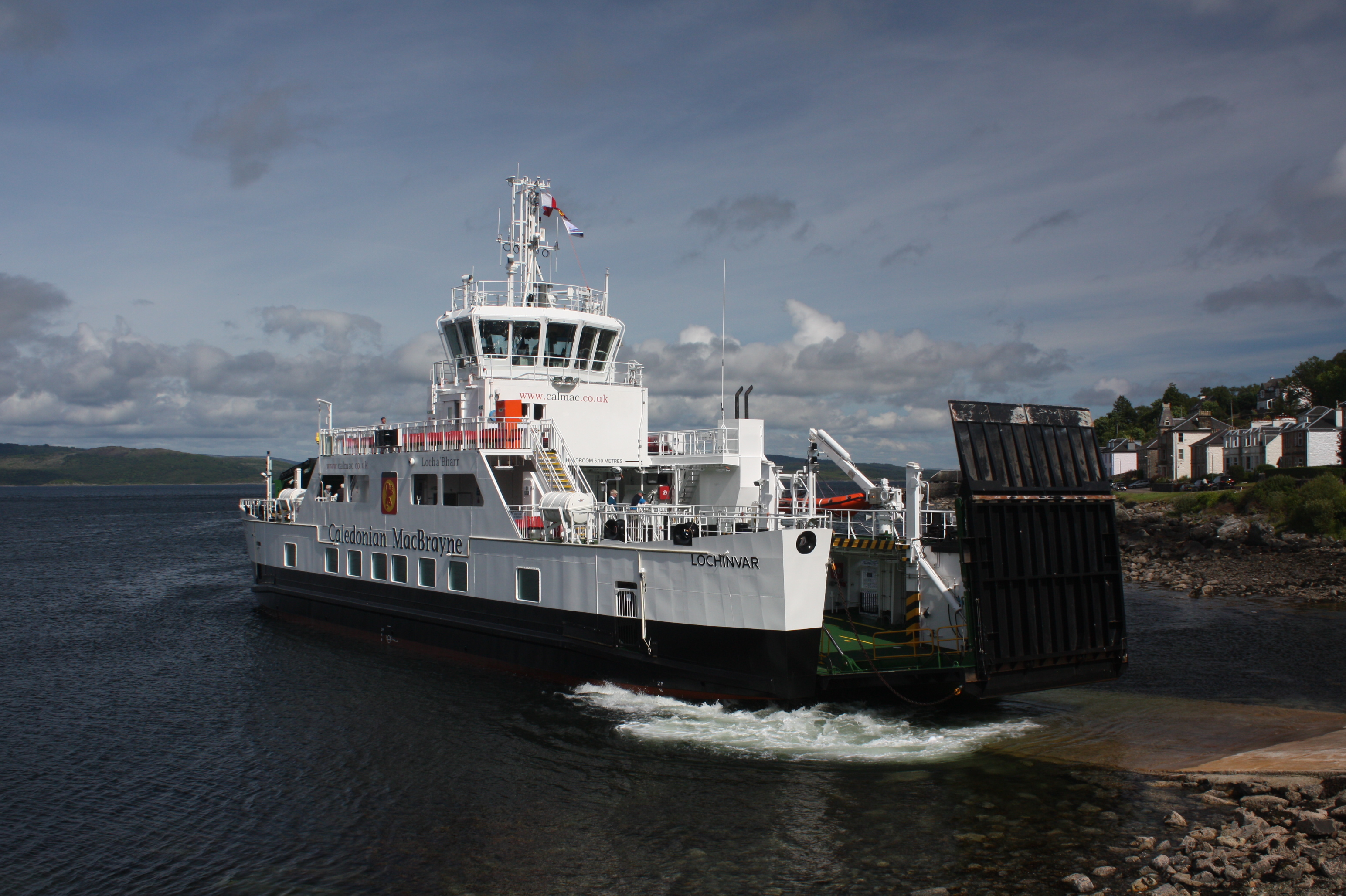
- MV Lochinvar

History

United Kingdom
- Name: MV Lochinvar; Scottish Gaelic: Loch a' Bharr
- Namesake: Lochinvar
- Owner: Caledonian Maritime Assets
- Operator: Caledonian MacBrayne
- Port of registry: Glasgow
- Route: Lochaline - Fishnish
- Ordered: 2011
- Builder: Ferguson Shipbuilders, Port Glasgow
- Cost: £12,000,000
- Yard number: 726
- Launched: 23 May 2013
- Christened: by Mrs Patricia Platten
- Completed: 2013
- Identification: IMO number: 9652844; MMSI number: 235099237; Callsign: 2GOU2
- Status: In service

General characteristics
- Type: Hybrid ro-ro vehicle and passenger ferry
- Tonnage: 499 GT; 135 DWT
- Length: 43.50 m (142 ft 9 in) (Overall); 39.99 m (131 ft 2 in) (Between Perpendiculars)
- Beam: 12.2 m (40 ft 0 in)
- Draught: 1.73 m (5 ft 8 in)
- Deck clearance: 5.1 m (16 ft 9 in)
- Installed power: Diesel Electric Hybrid: 3 × Volvo Penta Marine D13 MG and Lithium Ion batteries; Machinery: 2 × Permanent Magnet Motor 375 kW each
- Propulsion: 2x Voith 16 R5 EC/90-1 Units
- Speed: 9 kn (17 km/h)
- Capacity: 150 passengers; 23 cars; 2 HGVs
- Crew: 3

MV Lochinvar (Scottish Gaelic: Loch a' Bharr) is a pioneering diesel electric hybrid ferry built for Caledonian MacBrayne. Initially, she operated between Tarbert and Portavadie, was moved to the Mallaig to Armadale route in 2016 and currently operates on the Lochaline to Fishnish route. She is one of only three passenger and vehicle roll-on, roll-off ferries in the world to incorporate a low-carbon hybrid system of diesel electric and lithium-ion battery power and is the second hybrid ferry commissioned and owned by Caledonian Maritime Assets. The ferries are sea-going and are 43.5 m (143 ft) long, accommodating 150 passengers, 23 cars or two HGVs. The first ferry, MV Hallaig, entered service on the Sconser to Raasay route in October 2013. The third sister ship, MV Catriona, entered service in 2016.

== History ==
Lochinvar was launched on 23 May 2013 at Ferguson Shipbuilders in Port Glasgow by Mrs Patricia Platten, wife of CMAL CEO, Guy Platten. Lochinvar is only the second commercial ship to be fully built and delivered on the Clyde in over five years. The Scottish Government has invested more than £20 million in the project and the European Development Fund (ERDF) invested an additional £450,000 in December 2011.

The names of all ships in the hybrid fleet will follow MV Hallaig and be named after Scottish literature. Hundreds of people voted for the name and Lochinvar received over 55 per cent of the votes cast, with the name reflecting the poem by Sir Walter Scott, written in 1808.

== Layout ==
Lochinvar can accommodate 150 passengers, 23 cars or 2 HGVs. She has a service speed of 9 kn (17 km/h) and is powered by small diesel generator sets, feeding power to a 400-volt switchboard, which supplies power to electric propulsion motors that turn the propulsion units. In addition, two lithium-ion battery banks with a total of 700 kWh are also available to supply power to the units, reducing fuel and CO_{2} consumption by at least 20%. The battery banks will be charged overnight from the mains.

The vessel design and power configuration will additionally realise 19-24% savings of power input to the propulsion units over a conventional diesel mechanical solution reducing Carbon Dioxide, Sulphur Oxide and Nitrous Oxide emissions.

== Service ==
Lochinvar was built for the service between Tarbert and Portavadie, and launched on 23 May 2013. After undergoing sea trials in the Firth of Clyde between March and May 2014, she was handed over to CalMac on 6 May, and entered service on 27 May 2014, releasing MV Isle of Cumbrae.

Lochinvar led the Commonwealth Flotilla from Greenock to Glasgow on 26 July 2014 as part of celebrations for the 2014 Commonwealth Games. Throughout winter 2014, Lochinvar included sailings to Lochranza from Tarbert as part of the winter timetable, and also saw service relieving for other vessels in the CalMac fleet as they went for annual dry-docking. In January 2015 and January 2017, she relieved on the Largs - Cumbrae route so that MV Loch Shira could go for her overhaul.

It was announced in September 2015 that Lochinvar was to take over sailings between Mallaig and Armadale from April 2016, partnering MV Lord of the Isles and MV Loch Bhrusda, thus allowing MV Coruisk to become the second Oban - Craignure ferry. This reshuffling of the Mallaig fleet was widely criticised due to the reduced capacity offered by Lochinvar and inadequate passenger accommodation. Calls were made to retain MV Coruisk on the route alongside MV Lord of the Isles.

CalMac announced in January 2017 that Lochinvar would not return to the Mallaig - Armadale service. Instead, she has taken over sailings between Lochaline and Fishnish, allowing the larger MV Loch Fyne to take on the role as primary vessel for the Mallaig - Armadale service.
