= MV Loch Buie =

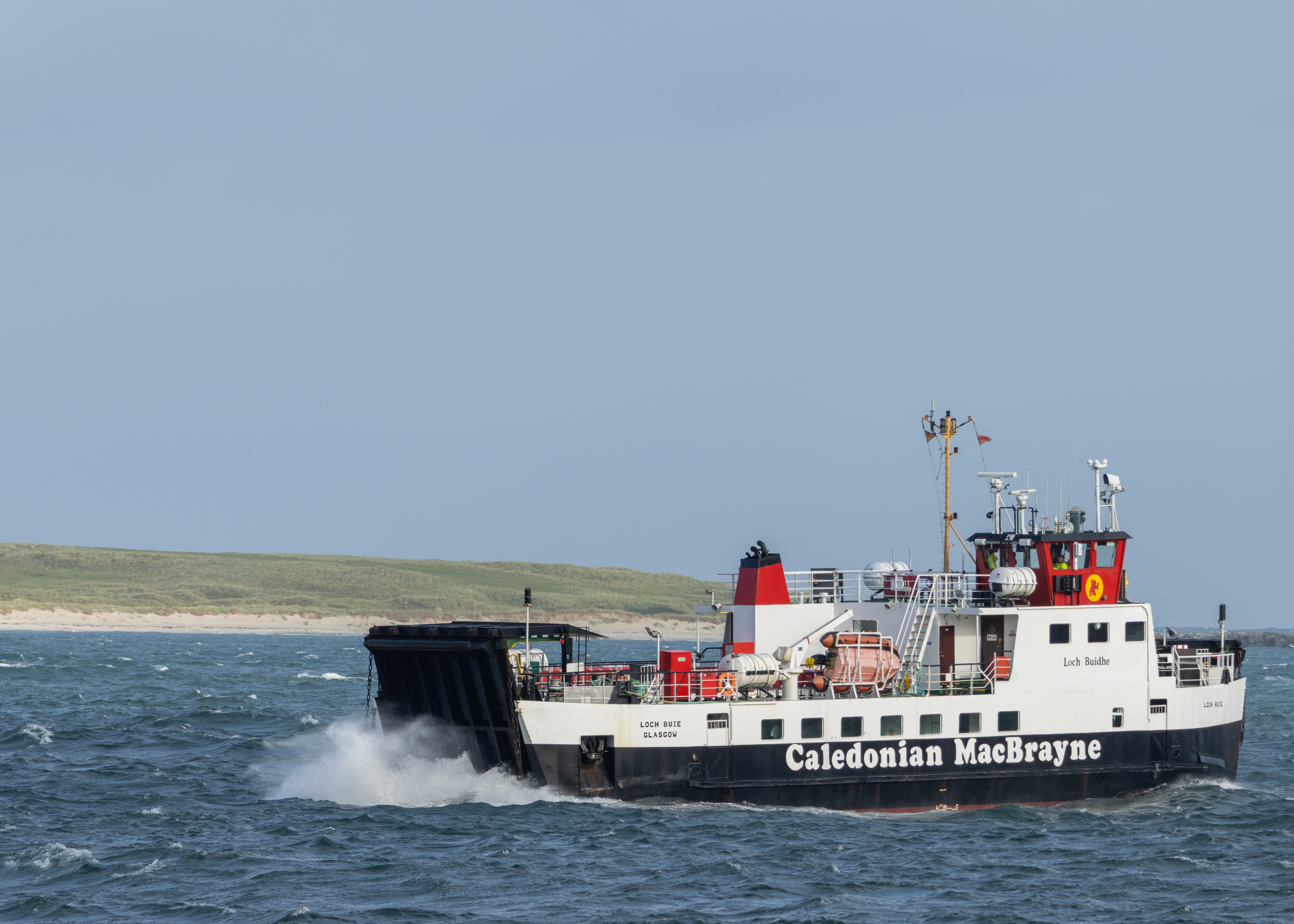
- MV Loch Buie in front of Iona

History

United Kingdom
- Name: MV Loch Buie; Scottish Gaelic: Loch Buidhe
- Namesake: Loch Buie on Mull
- Owner: Caledonian Maritime Assets Limited
- Operator: Caledonian MacBrayne
- Port of registry: Glasgow
- Route: Fionnphort to Iona
- Builder: J W Miller & Sons Ltd, St Monans
- Cost: £3,750,000
- Yard number: 1045
- Launched: 14 October 1991
- Completed: 1992
- In service: 1 July 1992
- Identification: IMO number: 9031375; Callsign: MPJU9; MMSI Number: 232003368
- Status: in service

General characteristics
- Class & type: ro-ro vehicle ferry
- Tonnage: 295 GT
- Length: 30.2 m (99 ft 1 in)
- Beam: 10.0 m (32 ft 10 in)
- Draft: 1.6 m (5 ft 3 in)
- Installed power: Machinery:
- Speed: 9 kn (17 km/h)
- Capacity: 250 passengers and 9 cars
- Crew: 4

MV Loch Buie (Scottish Gaelic: Loch Buidhe) is a Caledonian Maritime Assets Limited ferry built in 1992. She is operated by Caledonian MacBrayne on the crossing to Iona.

== History ==
Launched in 1992, Loch Buie underwent trials on the Forth, and was delivered to the west coast through the Caledonian Canal.

On her first day in service at Fionnphort, she struck the concrete ramp, damaging one of her Voith-Schneider units. Repairs followed on the Clyde and she returned to service in the summer.

== Layout ==
Loch Buie's layout is similar to the original "Baby Lochs" of 1986 and 1987. Her car deck can take two lanes of cars, with a passenger lounge on each side. An additional lounge straddles the car deck, towards the bow. This produces a height restriction for vehicles and reduces her suitability for other routes where drive-through operation for high vehicles is required. The additional lounge means her passenger certificate allows up to 250 passengers.

Her stern ramp was extended after a few years, avoiding the risk of passengers getting wet feet, and making it easier for large vehicles to board from the steep slipways.

== Service ==
Built for the Iona service, Loch Buie rarely sails on other routes.
