= MV Loch Striven =

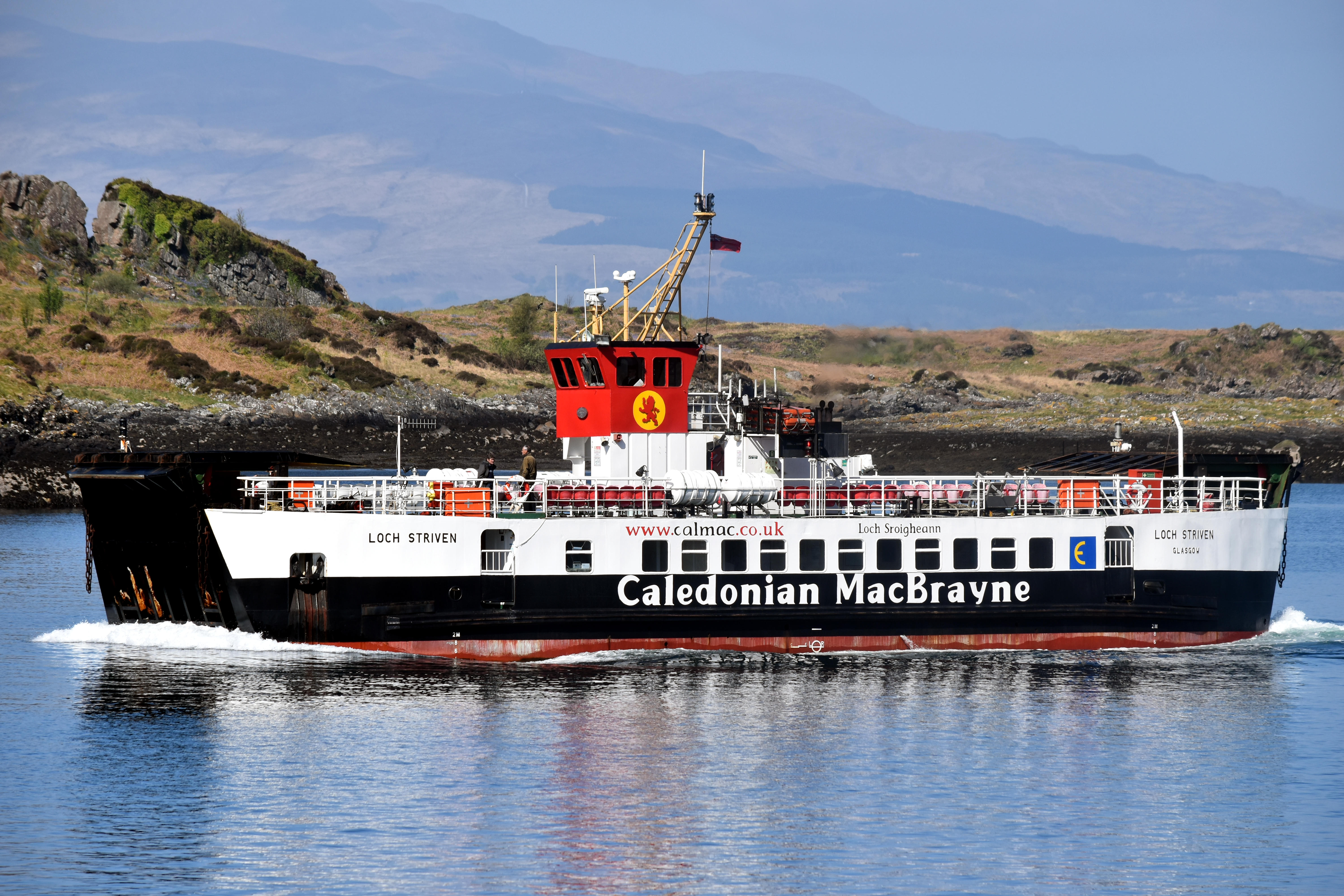
- Approaching Oban from Lismore, 9 May 2017.

History

United Kingdom
- Name: MV Loch Striven; Scottish Gaelic: Loch Sroigheann
- Namesake: Loch Striven, to the north of Bute
- Owner: Caledonian Maritime Assets Limited
- Operator: Caledonian MacBrayne
- Port of registry: Glasgow
- Route: Oban–Lismore
- Builder: R. Dunston, Hessle, East Riding of Yorkshire
- Yard number: H952
- Launched: 8 May 1986
- In service: 4 July 1986
- Identification: IMO number: 8512293; Callsign: MEXS9; MMSI Number: 232003376
- Status: in service

General characteristics
- Class & type: ro-ro vehicle ferry
- Tonnage: 206 GT; 65 DWT
- Length: 30.2 m (99 ft 1 in)
- Beam: 10 m (32 ft 10 in)
- Draught: 1.5 m (4 ft 11 in)
- Installed power: 6-cyl Volvo Penta
- Propulsion: 2 × Voith Schneider Propellers
- Speed: 9 kn (17 km/h)
- Capacity: 203 passengers and 12 cars
- Crew: 4

MV Loch Striven (Scottish Gaelic: Loch Sroigheann) is a Caledonian Maritime Assets Limited ro-ro car ferry, built in 1986 and operated by Caledonian MacBrayne. After over ten years at Largs, she spent 16 years on the Raasay crossing. Since 2014, she has been stationed on the Oban - Lismore crossing.

== History ==
MV Loch Striven was the first of four drive-through ferries built in the 1980s by Dunston's of Hessle, to cope with increasing traffic on CalMac's smaller routes.

== Layout ==
The four vessels are based on the design of MV Isle of Cumbrae. They have a second passenger lounge, on the port side, reducing the capacity of the car deck to 12. The wheelhouse is painted red and given a black top, as she has no funnels as such.

== Service ==
Loch Striven joined MV Isle of Cumbrae on the Largs–Great Cumbrae crossing in July 1986. After one month, MV Loch Linnhe replaced Isle of Cumbrae. The two new vessels continued at Largs for over ten years. In 1997, Loch Striven moved to Raasay, replacing the Island Class ferry, MV Raasay and remained at Raasay for 16 years. In 2013, she was displaced from Raasay by the new hybrid vessel MV Hallaig, and following her annual overhaul on the Clyde that winter she operated the Tarbert - Portavadie/Lochranza service. In April 2014, Loch Striven returned to her original station at Largs and operated the secondary roster alongside MV Loch Shira until June 2014, when she moved to the Oban - Lismore route.
