= Claonaig =

Coordinates: 55.75575°N 5.39605°W

Claonaig: Scottish Gaelic: Claonaig
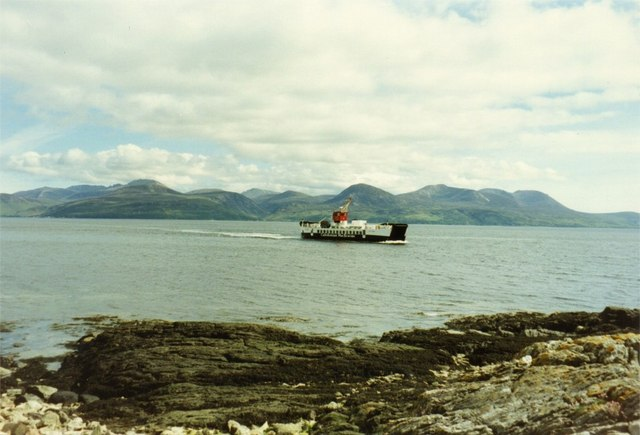
- The Isle of Arran and the CalMac ferry from the slipway at Claonaig

- Location within Argyll and Bute
- Council area: Argyll and Bute
- Lieutenancy area: Argyll and Bute
- Country: Scotland
- Sovereign state: United Kingdom
- Post town: TARBERT
- Postcode district: PA29
- Police: Scotland
- Fire: Scottish
- Ambulance: Scottish
- UK Parliament: Argyll, Bute and South Lochaber
- Scottish Parliament: Argyll and Bute

Claonaig (Scottish Gaelic: Claonaig, pronounced [ˈkʰl̪ˠɯːnɛkʲ]) is a hamlet on the east coast of the Kintyre peninsula in western Scotland, linked to Lochranza on the Isle of Arran by the CalMac ferry MV Catriona in the summer months.

Claonaig is a hamlet 1 mile (2 kilometres) south of Skipness, and is the location of the slipway for the seasonal ferry for Arran. The ferry terminal has a small car park, public toilets, and a bus stop for the West Coast Motors 448 bus service from Skipness to Lochgilphead via Kennacraig, Tarbert and Ardrishaig. The nearest sizeable villages are Tarbert, Skipness and Carradale. From Claonaig, Tarbert is 10 mi (16 km) away via the minor B8001 road and the A83. To the south, Campbeltown can be reached in 28 mi (45 km) via the B842 coast road or via the B8001 and the A83 which runs down the west coast of Kintyre (36 mi or 58 km).

A church was built in Claonaig in 1756. The current Parish Church, built in the late-18th or early-19th century, may incorporate some of its fabric. Its western gable has a bell-cot. It has been converted to a house.

| Preceding station | Ferry | Following station |
|---|---|---|
| Terminus | Caledonian MacBrayne; Arran Ferry (Summer only) | Lochranza |
