= Rhubodach =

Coordinates: 55°54′50″N 5°9′38″W

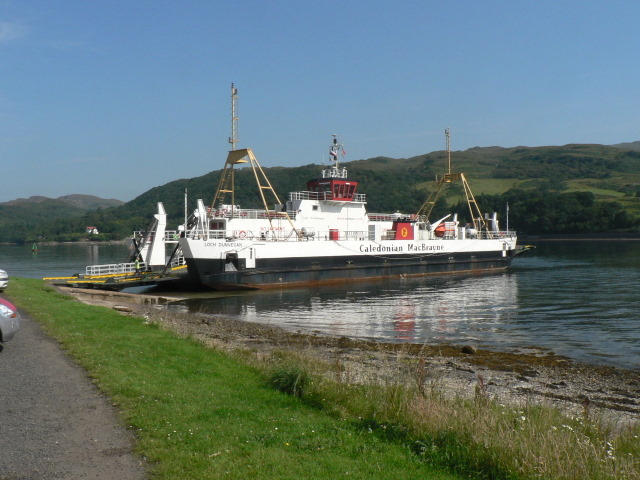
- MV Loch Dunvegan in the harbour of Rhubodach
- Country: Scotland
- Sovereign state: United Kingdom
- Dialling code: 01700
- UK Parliament: Argyll, Bute and South Lochaber
- Scottish Parliament: Argyll and Bute

Rhubodach is a small settlement on the north-eastern shore of the Isle of Bute, Argyll and Bute, Scotland.

The name rhubodach may come from the Gaelic rubha a' bhodaich which translates as old man's point or promontory or alternatively may be from An Rubha Bhòdaich meaning the Bute headland.

Rhubodach lies at the north of Bute on the A886 road. From here a small ro-ro ferry sails the short distance over the Kyles of Bute to Colintraive in Argyll, where the A886 road continues to Strachur. The route, operated by Caledonian MacBrayne's MV Loch Dunvegan, is reputed to be one of the shortest in Scotland still in operation. The issue of whether the ferry should be replaced by a bridge is one which reappears in various discussions about Bute's economy; however, opposition stems from the resulting loss of Bute's "island status".

Film actor and director Richard Attenborough owned Rhubodach estate for a number of years. In August 2009, he placed the 2,000-acre (800-hectare) estate up for sale. A referendum carried out on 12 February 2010 showed 93% of islanders supported a plan to buy the land for the community. In January 2011, he sold the estate, which included a forest, for the reduced fee of £1.48 million.
