= MV Hallaig =

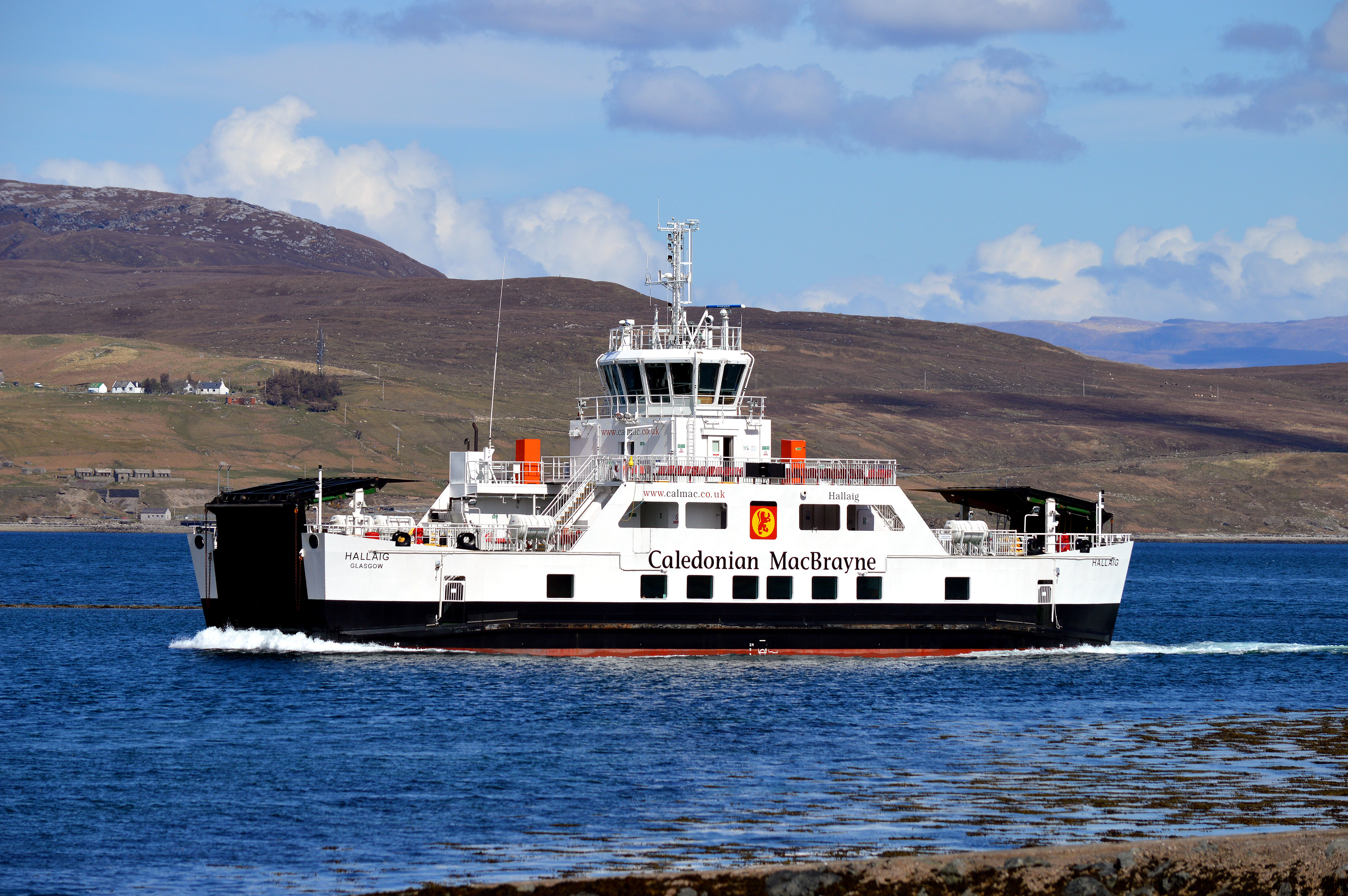
- Approaching Sconser, Skye on 9 May 2015.

History

United Kingdom
- Name: MV Hallaig
- Namesake: Hallaig
- Owner: Caledonian Maritime Assets
- Operator: Caledonian MacBrayne
- Port of registry: Glasgow
- Route: Sconser - Raasay
- Ordered: 2011
- Builder: Ferguson Shipbuilders, Port Glasgow
- Cost: £10 million (2011) (equivalent to £14.1 million in 2024)
- Yard number: 725
- Launched: 17 December 2012
- Christened: by Nicola Sturgeon
- Completed: 2013
- Identification: IMO number: 9652832; MMSI number: 235099235; Callsign: 2GOT8
- Status: In Service

General characteristics
- Type: Hybrid ro-ro vehicle and passenger ferry
- Tonnage: 499 GT; 135 DWT
- Length: 43.50 m (142 ft 9 in) (Overall); 39.99 m (131 ft 2 in) (Between Perpendiculars)
- Beam: 12.2 m (40 ft 0 in)
- Draught: 1.73 m (5 ft 8 in)
- Deck clearance: 5.1 m (16 ft 9 in)
- Installed power: Diesel Electric Hybrid: 3 × Volvo Penta Marine D13 MG and Lithium Ion batteries; Machinery: 2 × Permanent Magnet Motor 375 kW each
- Propulsion: 2x Voith 16 R5 EC/90-1 Units
- Speed: 9 kn (17 km/h)
- Capacity: 150 passengers; 23 cars; 2 HGVs
- Crew: 3

MV Hallaig is a pioneering Diesel Electric Hybrid ferry built for the Caledonian MacBrayne service between Skye and Raasay.

== History ==
Hallaig was launched in December 2012 at Ferguson Shipbuilders in Port Glasgow by Deputy First Minister Nicola Sturgeon. The name comes from a poem, written by Sorley MacLean, itself named after an abandoned township on Raasay. Hallaig was the first commercial ship to be fully built and delivered on the Clyde in over five years. The Scottish Government invested more than £20 million in the project.

== Layout ==
Hallaig is the first of three roll-on roll-off hybrid-powered ferries. She has a low-carbon system of diesel electric and lithium-ion battery power.

The 135-ton vessel is 43.5 metres (143 feet) long and accommodates 150 passengers and 23 cars or two HGVs.

== Service ==
Hallaig was built for the service between Sconser on Skye and Raasay and commenced service on 17 October 2013. The Clydebuilt Hallaig began her first sea trials on 5 August 2013, eight months after her launch, although she had moved in and out of dry dock in Greenock under her own power in July 2013. The delay in her entry to service was caused by a last minute change in fire safety regulations which required her and her sister Lochinvar to have insulation fitted extensively to exposed steel and aluminium on board. In April 2014, Hallaig temporarily relieved on the Mallaig-Armadale service after MV Coruisk was involved in an incident at Dunoon and had to have her bow extensively rebuilt.

In March 2018, she relieved on the Lochaline - Fishnish route so that her sister MV Lochinvar could go for her overhaul.
