= Fishnish =

Coordinates: 56°30′53″N 5°48′38″W

Fishnish: Scottish Gaelic: Finnsinis
- Hamlet
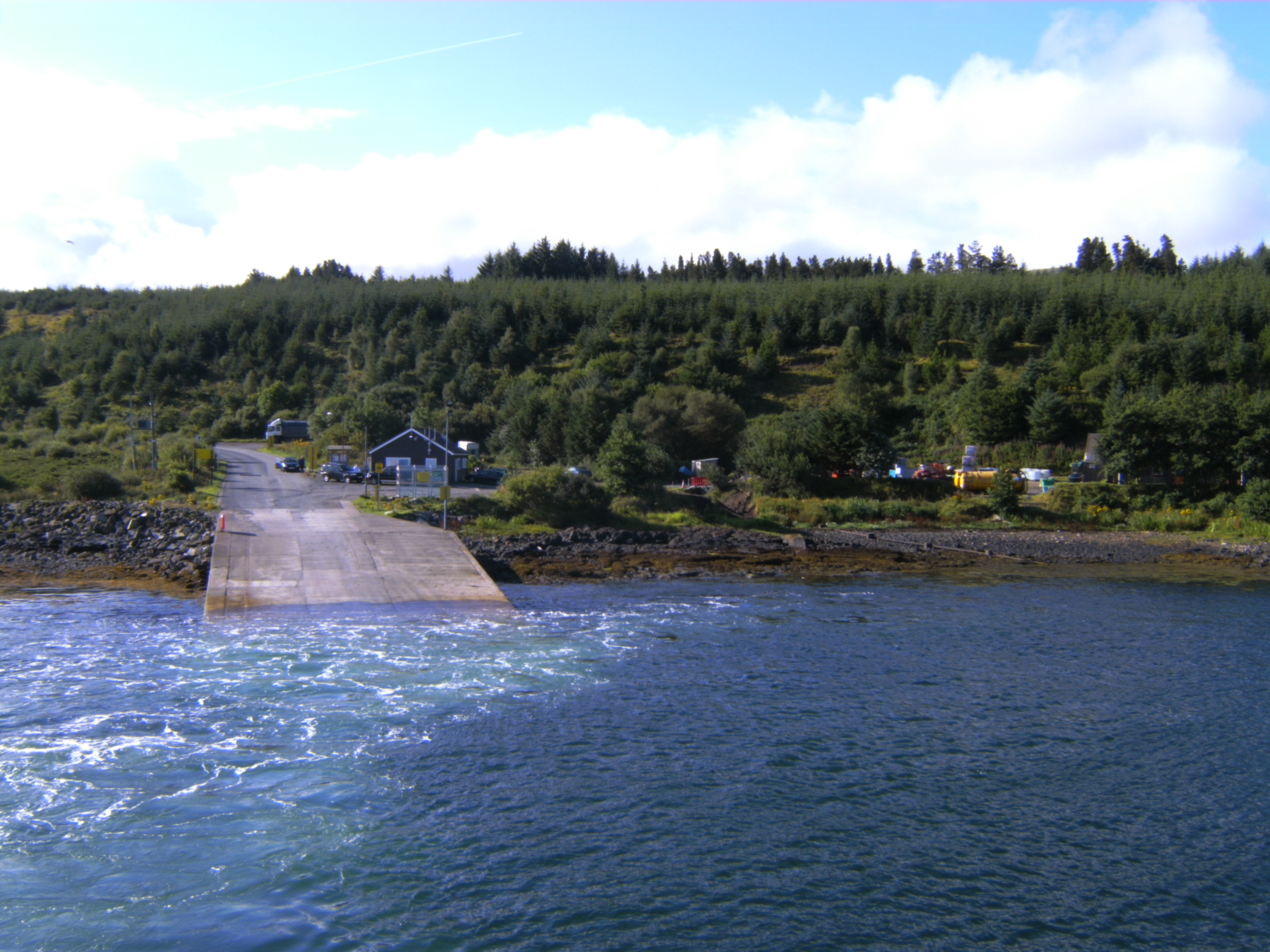
- Fishnish ferry slipway

- Location within Argyll and Bute
- Population: Unknown
- Civil parish: Torosay
- Council area: Argyll and Bute
- Country: Scotland
- Sovereign state: United Kingdom
- Police: Scotland
- Fire: Scottish
- Ambulance: Scottish
- UK Parliament: Argyll, Bute and South Lochaber
- Scottish Parliament: Argyll and Bute

Fishnish (Scottish Gaelic: Finnsinis) is a hamlet on the Isle of Mull, roughly halfway between Tobermory and Craignure. The most significant part of the area is the ferry terminal and slipway, owned by Caledonian Maritime Assets and operated by Caledonian MacBrayne. It is served mainly by MV Lochinvar that crosses the Sound of Mull to and from Lochaline.

Fishnish has some houses and small buildings, and also has a forestry workplace.

The ferry port consists of a slipway sticking out into the Sound of Mull with a vehicle queuing area stretching back onto the road, a car park next to the slipway, and a small café next to the slipway with public toilets and an electronic display showing ferry times and other information.

There is a forest open to the public for walks in and around Fishnish. Beside the current Fishnish is Ceadha Leth Torcail (Gaelic for "the pier of Torquil's half-share", an historic cattle harbour).
