= Sconser =

Coordinates: 57.312017°N 6.114980°W

Sconser: Scottish Gaelic: Sgonnsair
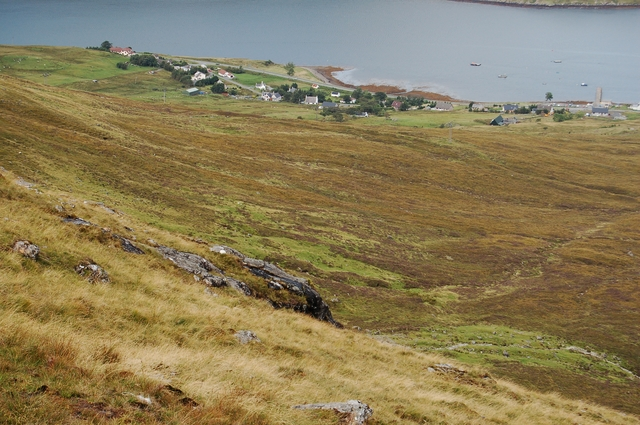

- Location within the Isle of Skye
- OS grid reference: NG523321
- Council area: Highland
- Lieutenancy area: Ross and Cromarty
- Country: Scotland
- Sovereign state: United Kingdom
- Post town: ISLE OF SKYE
- Postcode district: IV48
- Dialling code: 01478
- Police: Scotland
- Fire: Scottish
- Ambulance: Scottish
- UK Parliament: Ross, Skye and Lochaber
- Scottish Parliament: Skye, Lochaber and Badenoch

Sconser (Scottish Gaelic: Sgonnsair) is a small crofting township on the island of Skye, in Scotland, situated on the south shore of Loch Sligachan. The main A87 road of Skye passes through Sconser and the ferry to Raasay departs from the pier.

Less than one mile (two kilometres) to the east is the 9-hole Isle Of Skye golf course. Immediately to the south is Glamaig which can be climbed via An Coileach (The Cockerel). Sconser was the birthplace of the professional climber John Mackenzie (1856–1933) after whom Sgurr Mhic Choinnich (Mackenzie's Peak) is named.

The settlement of Peinachorran lies on a northeasterly direction across the loch.

Caledonian MacBrayne operate a year round ferry service from Sconser over to the Isle of Raasay.

== Gallery ==
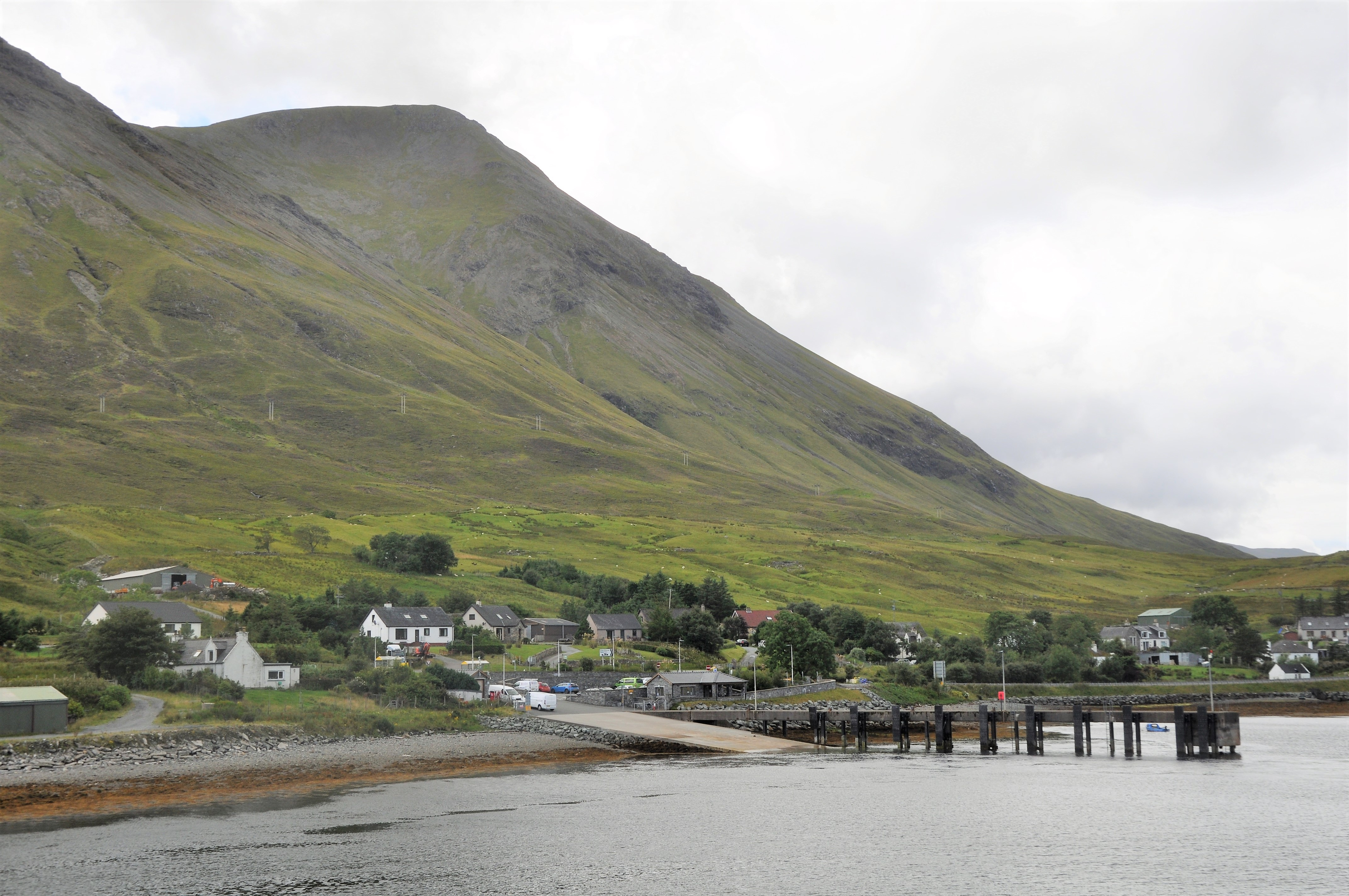
Sconser

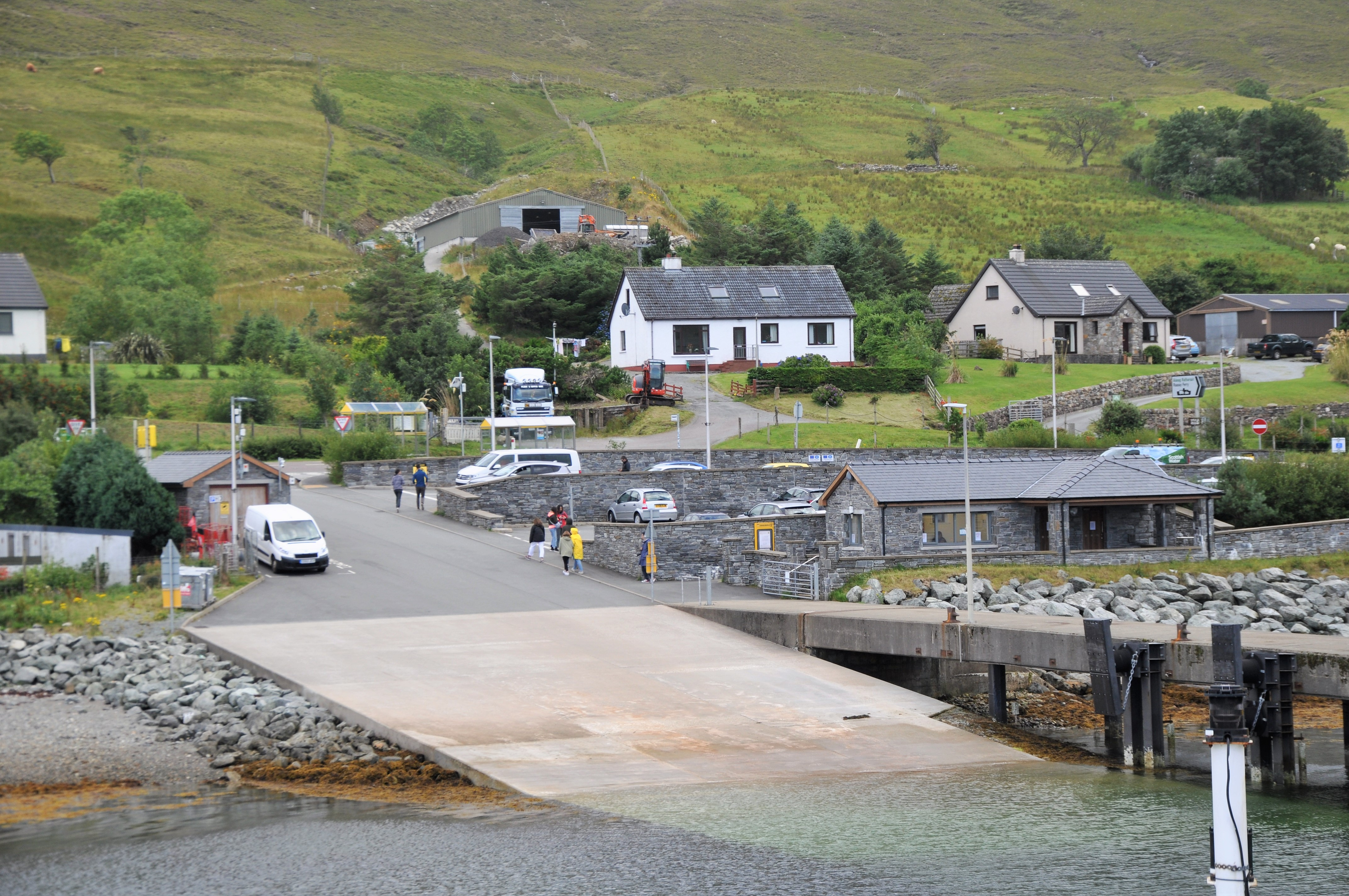
Harbour pier for the Raasay ferry

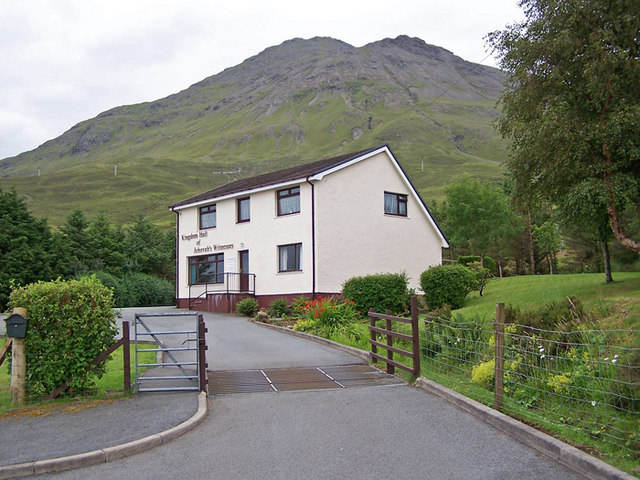
Kingdom Hall, Sconser

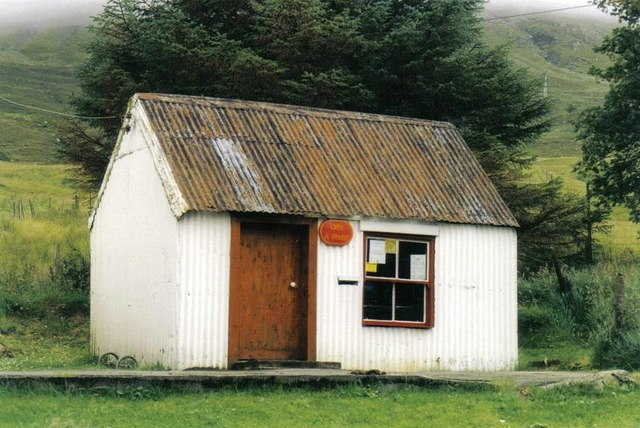
Sconser post office
