= MV Coruisk (1969) =

History

United Kingdom
- Name: MV Coruisk
- Namesake: Loch Coruisk
- Owner: Caledonian Steam Packet Company
- Port of registry: Glasgow
- Route: 1969 - 1971: Kyle of Lochalsh - Kyleakin; 1972 - 1977: Largs - Cumbrae; 1977 - 1983: Scalpay & Winter Relief; 1983 - 1986: Relief
- Builder: Ailsa Shipbuilding Company, Troon Engines: English Electric Diesels (Kelvin), Glasgow
- Cost: £44,000
- Yard number: 531
- Launched: 26 June 1969
- In service: July 1969

General characteristics
- Type: Ferry
- Tonnage: 60 GT
- Length: 75.9 ft (23.1 m)
- Beam: 21 ft (6.4 m)
- Draught: 6.1 ft (1.9 m)
- Installed power: 2 Oil 4 SCSA 4 cyl. 6” x 7”
- Speed: 9 knots (17 km/h; 10 mph)
- Capacity: 70 passengers and 9 cars

MV Coruisk was a side-loading vehicle ferry, built in 1969 for the Skye crossing. Superseded by larger, drive-through vessels, she was converted to bow-loading and moved to Largs and later to Scalpay where she served until 1983.

== History ==
MV Coruisk was built in 1969 to provide additional capacity at Kyle of Lochalsh. The Skye crossing was an urgent problem when STG took over control from 1 January 1969. The existing vessels were side-loading and could not keep up with increasing demand. In August 1969, it was announced that two new 28-car bow-loading ferries were to be built. Coruisk was built to provide additional short-term capacity until these would enter service. Once the larger ferries arrived, Coruisk was no longer required for Skye.

Coruisk was converted to bow-loading and began a short crossing from Largs to a new slipway on Great Cumbrae. This service was successful and by July 1972, she was joined by Kyleakin II (renamed MV Largs and also converted from turntable ferry to bow-loading). When that service obtained its own drive-through vessel, MV Isle of Cumbrae in 1977, Coruisk saw relief service throughout the network including Scalpay. The arrival of the first Loch class vessels in 1986, made Coruisk redundant again.

In 1986, she was sold to Euroyachts Ltd. of Glasgow and in 1987 to a new owner in Penzance. Following a further sale in 1988 to Lampogas S.p.A. she was renamed Lampomare Uno.

== Layout ==
Coruisk was similar to MV Portree and MV Broadford with side ramps. Unlike her sisters, she had a passenger lounge.

In 1971, she was converted to bow-loading, with a hydraulically operated bow ramp and could then carry eight or nine cars.

== Service ==
Initially joining a fleet of older, side-loading vessels at Skye, Coruisk was displaced by arrival of the new Lochalsh and Kyleakin in 1971. She then inaugurated a new service to Cumbrae until demand there warranted a new drive-through vessel. For the remainder of her CalMac career, she relieved throughout the network.

Lampomare Uno carried hazardous cargos to Elba from mainland Italy.
