= MV Scalpay =

History

United Kingdom
- Name: MV Scalpay; MV Lochalsh (II)
- Namesake: Scalpay / Lochalsh
- Owner: Caledonian Steam Packet Company; David MacBrayne; Ardmaleish Boat Building Co.
- Port of registry: Glasgow
- Route: 1957 - 1970: Kyle of Lochalsh - Kyleakin; 1971 - 1977: Scalpay, Outer Hebrides
- Builder: Ailsa Shipbuilding Company, Troon Engines: Gleniffer Engines Ltd., Glasgow
- Yard number: 499
- In service: April 1957

General characteristics
- Class & type: side-loading turntable ferry
- Tonnage: 64 GT
- Length: 75.7 ft (23.1 m)
- Beam: 21 ft (6.4 m)
- Draught: 6.1 ft (1.9 m)
- Installed power: 2 Oil 4 SCSA 4 cyl 6” x 7”
- Speed: 8 knots (15 km/h; 9.2 mph)
- Capacity: 100 passengers and 6 cars
- Crew: 3

MV Lochalsh was a side-loading turntable ferry, built in 1957 for the Caledonian Steam Packet Company for the Kyle of Lochalsh - Skye crossing. Superseded by larger, drive-through vessels, she was renamed MV Scalpay and moved to Scalpay where she served until 1977.

== History ==
MV Lochalsh was built in 1957 for the Kyle of Lochalsh to Kyleakin crossing, replacing an earlier vessel of that name. She served there with other side-loaders until the arrival of the new drive-through vessels, Lochalsh and Kyleakin in 1970/71.

Renamed MV Scalpay, ownership passed to David MacBrayne, although she was operated by the MacSween family. She remained in MacBrayne ownership, not transferring to Caledonian MacBrayne Holdings Ltd. in 1973.

Once superseded at Scalpay, she lay at Lochaline until May 1978 when she was towed to Crinan, making her own way through the canal and a further tow to Shandon. In November 1979, she was sold to the Ardmaleish Boat Building Co. of Bute for spares for Largs (ex-Kyleakin). She ended her days as a barge on the Ayrshire coast.

== Layout ==
Lochalsh was similar in specification and profile to the later Portree and Broadford. She had side ramps and could carry six cars but had no passenger lounge.

For service at Scalpay, her ramps were remodelled with angled ends to suit the steeper slipways.

== Service ==
Lochalsh proved extremely reliable at Kyleakin, being joined by further side-loading vessels on the increasingly busy service until 1970. In anticipation of the arrival of two new drive-through ferries, her sister Kyleakin II spent the 1970 summer season at Scalpay, Outer Hebrides. This was so successful that Lochalsh (as Scalpay) became the regular vessel there, remaining until replaced by Morvern on 12 January 1977.

Scalpay was beached to await her fate. In July and August she provided service as the Corran Ferry across the narrows of Loch Linnhe, although troubled by breakdowns.
