= MV Largs =

History

United Kingdom
- Name: MV Kyleakin; MV Kyleakin II; MV Largs
- Namesake: Kyleakin and Largs
- Owner: Caledonian Steam Packet Company
- Port of registry: Glasgow
- Route: 1960 - 1971: Kyle of Lochalsh - Kyleakin; 1970: Scalpay; 1972 - 1983: Largs - Cumbrae & Relief
- Builder: Ailsa Shipbuilding Company, Troon Engines: Gleniffer Engines Ltd., Glasgow
- Yard number: 510
- Out of service: 1983

General characteristics
- Class & type: turntable ferry
- Tonnage: 64 GT
- Length: 75.7 ft (23.1 m)
- Beam: 21 ft (6.4 m)
- Draught: 6.1 ft (1.9 m)
- Installed power: 2 Oil 4SCSA 4 cyl. 6” x 7”
- Speed: 8 knots (15 km/h; 9.2 mph)
- Capacity: 100 passengers and 9 cars

MV Kyleakin was the last turntable ferry, built in 1960 for the Skye crossing. Replaced by larger ferries in 1970, she was converted to bow-loading. As MV Largs, she moved to the Cumbrae Slip crossing where she served until 1976.

== History ==
MV Kyleakin was built for the increasingly popular Skye crossing. In 1961, the Kyle of Lochalsh slipway was enlarged so that two of the turntable ferries could load there at the same time.

In 1965, Kyleakin was at the centre of demonstrations against the commencement of Sunday sailings. These were initially seasonal but ran all year round from October 1969.

In 1970, she was renamed Kyleakin II, to make way for one of the new 28-car double-ended ferries then under construction.

== Layout ==
Kyleakin was built with side ramps and a deck-turntable. She had no passenger lounge. In 1970, she was converted to bow-loading, with a hydraulically operated bow ramp. She lost her side-ramps and deck-turntable.

== Service ==
Kyleakin joined a fleet of small vessels at Skye that struggled to meet increasing demand. In anticipation of the arrival of new ferries, Kyleakin II spent the 1970 summer season at Scalpay with such success that her sister MV Lochalsh (II) became the regular vessel there.

With the arrival at Skye of the new Lochalsh and Kyleakin in 1971, the remaining three side-loaders were surplus to requirement. The converted MV Coruisk (1969) proved so successful on the new Cumbrae Slip crossing that Kyleakin II, renamed Largs was similarly converted to bow-loading and joined her. This deployment continued until 1977 when both were replaced by the new MV Isle of Cumbrae. While Coruisk relieved widely, Largs remained as backup at Largs. She gave her last public sailing at Largs on 26 September 1983 and was subsequently sold to Ardmaleish Boatbuilding Co. Ltd at Port Bannatyne, Bute. In 1987, she left the Clyde for South Yemen, on a cargo-ship.
