= MV Isle of Cumbrae =

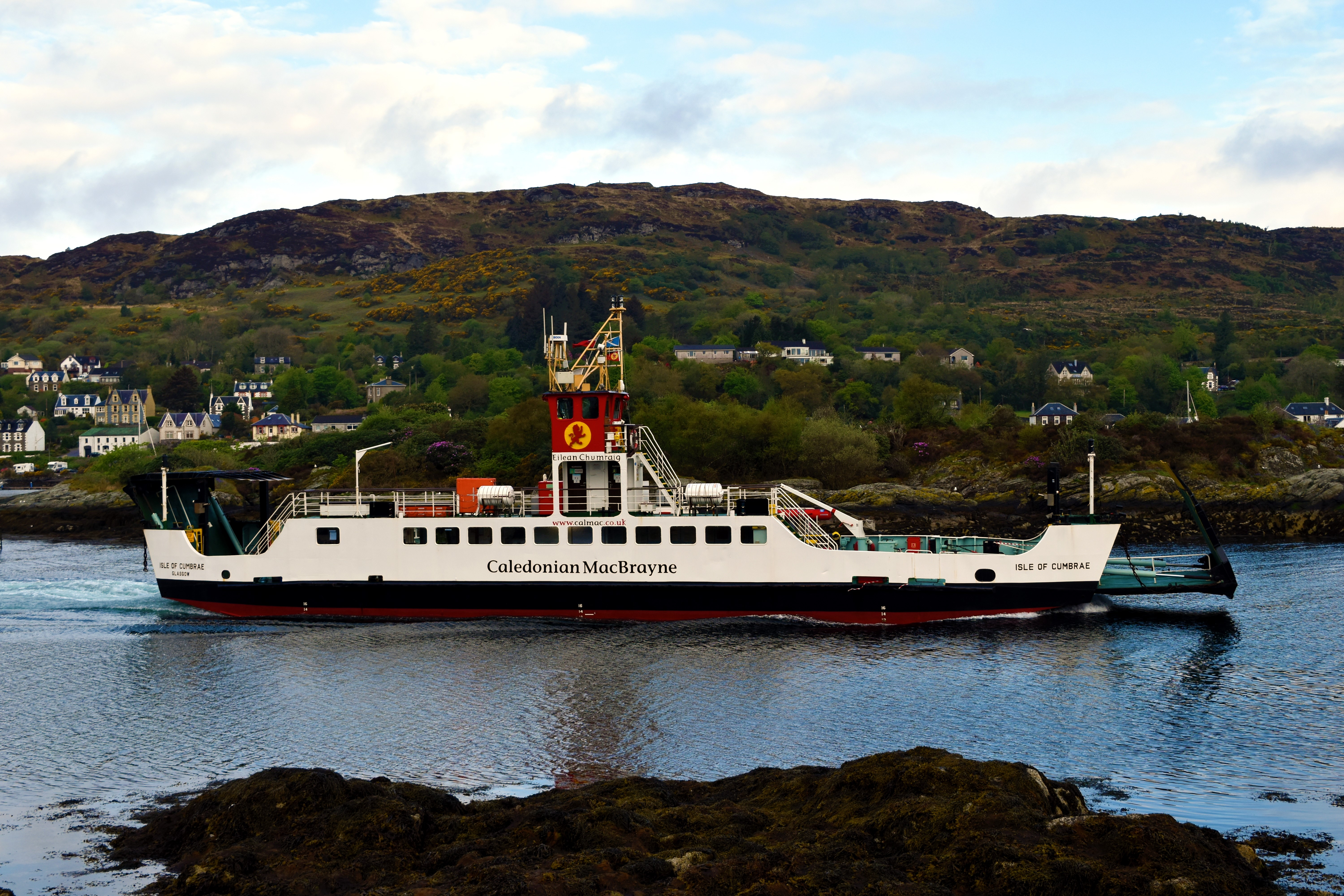
- At Tarbert, Loch Fyne, May 2019.

History

United Kingdom
- Name: MV Isle of Cumbrae; Scottish Gaelic: Eilean Chumraigh
- Namesake: Isle of Cumbrae
- Owner: Caledonian Maritime Assets Limited
- Operator: Caledonian MacBrayne
- Port of registry: Glasgow
- Route: Tarbert - Portavadie (summer)
- Builder: Ailsa Shipbuilding Company, Troon
- Yard number: 551
- Launched: 22 December 1976
- In service: 4 April 1977
- Identification: IMO number: 7521625; Callsign: 2MTM; MMSI Number: 232003244

General characteristics
- Class & type: ro-ro vehicle ferry
- Tonnage: 169 GT; 72 t DWT
- Length: 32 m (105 ft 0 in)
- Beam: 10 m (32 ft 10 in)
- Draught: 1.4 m (4 ft 7 in)
- Installed power: 1. 6-cyl Gardner Engines Ltd, Manchester; 2. 2 × Scania D9, 171 kW @ 1,800 RPM
- Propulsion: 2 × Voith Schneider Propellers
- Speed: 8.5 kn (15.7 km/h)
- Capacity: 160 passengers and 18 cars
- Crew: 3

MV Isle of Cumbrae (Scottish Gaelic: Eilean Chumraigh) is a Caledonian Maritime Assets Limited ro-ro car ferry, built in 1976 and operated by Caledonian MacBrayne. For ten years she was at Largs and operated the Loch Fyne crossing from 1999 to 2014. She was replaced by the MV Lochinvar in 2014, a new diesel-electric hybrid ferry capable of holding 23 cars and 150 passengers. She returned to Tarbert in 2016 after MV Lochinvar was moved to the Mallaig - Armadale station. As of 2025, she is the oldest vessel in the CalMac fleet.

== History ==
Isle of Cumbrae was built in 1976 by Ailsa Shipbuilding Company of Troon. A crew mess room was added aft of the passenger saloon in early 1994, with the upper deck extended over it. In early 2002, she was re-engined with Scania diesels.

== Layout ==
Isle of Cumbrae's design is a scaled-down version of the Skye ferries MV Kyleakin and MV Lochalsh. She has three lanes on her car deck, with ramps at either end which fold in two sections, like those on the Island Class ferries. Passenger accommodation is down the starboard side, with a small wheelhouse above.

Voith Schneider units at diagonally opposite corners of her hull provide propulsion.

== Service ==
MV Isle of Cumbrae took up the Largs crossing in early April 1977, replacing two small bow-loading ferries, Largs and Coruisk. She remained on this crossing until summer 1986, when the route was taken over by twins MV Loch Striven and MV Loch Linnhe.

In August 1986, Isle of Cumbrae moved to the Fishnish – Lochaline crossing in the Sound of Mull, replacing the small MV Canna. She remained there until July 1997, when she was replaced by the larger MV Loch Alainn. Isle of Cumbrae replaced MV Loch Riddon in the Kyles of Bute, but was herself replaced by the much larger MV Loch Dunvegan in 1999. She then transferred to the summer Tarbert – Portavadie route across Loch Fyne. In winter she took up a relief role, covering MV Loch Dunvegan (Colintraive) and MV Loch Fyne (Lochaline).

In 2014, she was replaced by the diesel-electric hybrid ferry MV Lochinvar, becoming a spare vessel. The 2015 season saw her back at Largs while covering for a broken-down MV Loch Shira and providing additional sailings from Claonaig to Lochranza alongside MV Loch Tarbert during the Brodick Highland Games, before going back to Tarbert and lying spare.

In early 2016, she returned to the Tarbert – Portavadie route after MV Lochinvar moved to the Mallaig - Armadale station.

In Spring 2024, Isle of Cumbrae returned to her original route between Largs and Cumbrae alongside MV Loch Riddon, after MV Loch Shira was removed from service following damage to her ramps. Isle of Cumbrae briefly returned to Tarbert whilst MV Loch Bhrusda took up service at Largs, but returned soon after.

At the end of August 2024, Isle of Cumbrae was removed from service while she was operating on the Tarbert to Portavadie route due to engine problems, she was originally replaced by a chartered vessel from Kintyre Express. Eventually, MV Loch Tarbert took over the route and Isle of Cumbrae was moved to lay-up at Sandbank. For the start of the 2025 summer timetable, Loch Tarbert remained at the Tarbert to Portavadie route, with Isle of Cumbrae returning to her original route between Largs and Cumbrae, alongside Loch Shira.
