= Caledonian Steam Packet Company =

Scottish shipping company

- Industry: Shipping
- Founded: 1889
- Defunct: 1973
- Fate: Taken over
- Successor: Caledonian MacBrayne
- Area served: Clyde and West of Scotland

The Caledonian Steam Packet Company provided a scheduled shipping service, carrying freight and passengers, on the west coast of Scotland. Formed in 1889 to complement the services of the Caledonian Railway, the company expanded by taking over rival ferry companies. In 1973, they were merged with MacBraynes as Caledonian MacBrayne.

== Formation ==
Rival railway companies, the Caledonian Railway (CR), the North British Railway (NBR) and the Glasgow and South Western Railway (GSWR) at first used the services of various early private operators of Clyde steamers. The CR failed to attract private ship owners to their new extension from Greenock to the fishing village of Gourock. They had purchased the harbour at Gourock, which had advantages of a faster line from Glasgow, bypassing the Glasgow and South Western Railway Prince's Pier at Greenock, and being closer to the Clyde resorts. The CR began operating steamers on its own account in 1889.

The Caledonian Steam Packet Company (CSP) was formed as a packet company in May 1889, with Captain James Williamson as secretary and manager. Nominally an independent company, they bought the ships needed to operate steamer services to and from Gourock. On withdrawal of the Wemyss Bay Steamboat Company in 1890, CSP took over services to Rothesay, Largs and Millport. In June 1890, they established a service to Arran from the Lanarkshire and Ayrshire Railway railhead at Ardrossan. In the years that followed, there was significant investment in piers and ships.

== Amalgamations ==
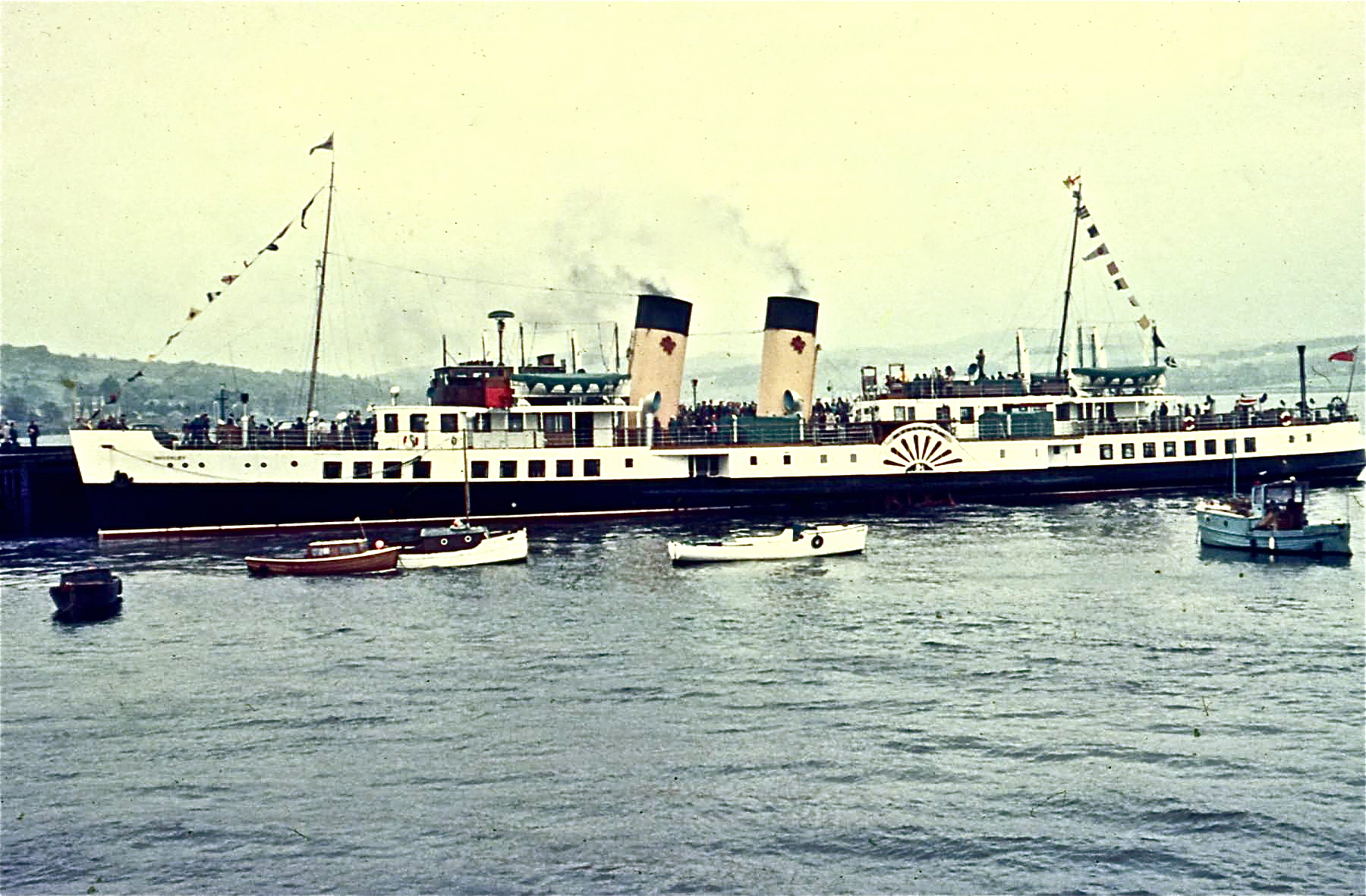
PS Waverley in 1970, funnels in CSP livery with red lion rampant

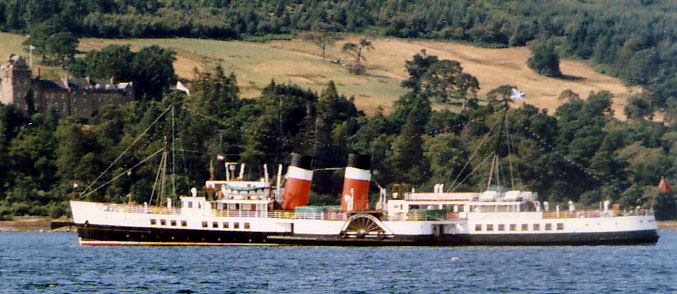
PS Waverley restored to its original LNER livery

After years of fierce competition between all the fleets, the CR and GSWR amalgamated with several other railways at the start of 1923 to form the London, Midland and Scottish Railway (LMS) and their fleets amalgamated into the Caledonian Steam Packet Company, their funnels being painted yellow with a black top. At the same time the NBR (and its shipping fleet) also amalgamated with other railways to create the London and North Eastern Railway (LNER), which built the PS Waverley in 1947.

In 1935, Williamson-Buchanan Steamers was taken over by the Caledonian Steam Packet Company.

In 1945, the Caledonian Steam Packet Company took responsibility for the Kyleakin to Kyle of Lochalsh ferry.

With nationalisation in 1948, the LMS and LNER fleets were amalgamated as Clyde Shipping Services, under the control of the British Transport Commission.

In 1957 a reorganisation restored the Caledonian Steam Packet Company name, and in 1965 a red lion was added to each side of the black-topped yellow funnels. The headquarters remained at Gourock pierhead.

At the end of December 1968 management of the Caledonian Steam Packet Company passed to the Scottish Transport Group, which gained control of David MacBrayne's the following June. The MacBrayne service from Gourock to Ardrishaig ended on 30 September 1969, leaving the Clyde services entirely to the Caledonian Steam Packet Company.

== Merger with MacBraynes ==
On 1 January 1973 the Caledonian Steam Packet Co. acquired most of the ships and routes of David MacBrayne Ltd and commenced joint Clyde and West Highland operations under the new name of Caledonian MacBrayne, with a combined headquarters at Gourock.

== List of ships operated by the company ==
Type	Name	Built	Launched	Tonnage (GRT)	Operated	Notes	Photo
PS	Meg Merrilies	Barclay, Curle & Co., Glasgow	1883	244	1889-1902	ex Capt. Robert Campbell; Sold for service in Rio de Janeiro, Brazil, scrapped in 1921.	
PS	Caledonia (I)	Rankin & Blackmore, Greenock	1889	244	1889-1933	Scrapped in Barrow-in-Furness in 1933.	
PS	Galatea	Caird & Co., Greenock	1889	331	1889-1906	Scrapped in Palermo in 1911.	
PS	Madge Wildfire	McKnight, Ayr	1886	220	1890-1911	ex Capt. Robert Campbell; Scrapped at Troon in 1946.	
PS	Marchioness of Bredalbane	John Reid & Co., Port Glasgow	1890	246	1890-1935	Sold for scrap in 1935, but saved for use as an excursion steamer in Great Yarmouth. Scrapped in 1937 in Germany.	
PS	Marchioness of Bute	John Reid & Co., Port Glasgow	1890	246	1890-1908	Sold to Tay Pleasure Steamers in 1908. Scrapped at Inverkeithing in 1923.	
PS	Duchess of Hamilton (I)	Wm. Denny & Bros., Dumbarton	1890	533	1890-1914	She served as a minesweeper during World War I. She struck a mine in the Thames Estuary, laid by German submarine UC-3, and sank on 29 November 1915.	
PS	Marchioness of Lorne (I)	Russell & Co., Port Glasgow	1891	295	1891-1914	Returned after World War I, but not re-commissioned, lay at Bowling Harbour until scrapped in 1923.	
PS	Duchess of Rothesay	J. & G. Thomson, Clydebank	1895	338	1895-1939	Scrapped in the Netherlands after World War II.	
PS	Duchess of Montrose (I)	John Brown & Co., Clydebank	1902	321	1902-1914	Sunk whilst serving as minesweeper, 1917.	Paddle Steamer Duchess of Montrose
PS	Duchess of Fife	Fairfield Shipbuilding & Eng. Co., Govan	1903	336	1903-1953	Scrapped at Port Glasgow in 1953.	
TS	Duchess of Argyll	Wm. Denny & Bros., Dumbarton	1906	593	1906-1952	Sold to Admiralty for use as a test vessel in Portland. Scrapped at Newhaven in 1970.	
PS	Ivanhoe	D. & W. Henderson & Co., Glasgow	1880	282	1897-1911; 1916-1919 (charter)	ex Firth of Clyde Steam Packet Co. Scrapped at Dumbarton in 1919.	
SS	Queen of the Lake	Ailsa Shipbuilding Co., Ayr	1907	152	1922-1949	Inherited from the Loch Tay Steamboat Company 1922. Scrapped at Kenmore in 1950.	At Kenmore. Dundee Courier Wednesday 2 November 1932
SS	Countess of Breadalbane (I)	Abercorn Shipbuilding Co, Paisley	1882	95	1922-1936	Scrapped at Loch Awe in 1936.	
SS	Lady of the Lake	Anderson & Lyall, Govan	1882	68	1922-1929	Inherited from the Loch Tay Steamboat Company 1922. Scrapped at Kenmore in 1929.	
SS	Sybilla		1882		1922-1929	Inherited from the Loch Tay Steamboat Company 1922. Scrapped	
PS	Prince Edward	A. & J. Inglis, Glasgow	1911	304	1923-1955	Scrapped at Balloch in 1955.	
TS	Atlanta	John Brown & Co., Clydebank	1906	486	1923-1937	Scrapped at Ghent in 1946.	
PS	Juno (I)	Clydebank Shipbuilding & Engineering Co	1898	592	1923-1932	Scrapped at Alloa in 1932.	
PS	Glen Sannox (I)	James & George Thomson, Clydebank	1892	610	1923-1925	Scrapped at Port Glasgow in 1925.	
TS	Duchess of Montrose (II)	Wm. Denny & Bros., Dumbarton	1930	806	1930-1965	Scrapped at Ghent in 1965.	
TS	Duchess of Hamilton (II)	Harland & Wolff, Govan	1932	801	1932-1971	Scrapped at Troon in 1974.	
PS	Caledonia (II)	Wm. Denny & Bros., Dumbarton	1934	624	1934-1969	Sold for use as a floating pub in central London. Suffered fire damage beyond repair on 27 April 1980 and scrapped in Sittingbourne as a result.	
PS	Eagle III	A. & J. Inglis/Napier and Miller	1909	432	1935-1946	Acquired from Williamson-Buchanan Steamers in 1935, requisitioned by the Admiralty in 1939, returned in 1945 but not returned to service, scrapped in 1946.	
PS	Marchioness of Lorne	Fairfield Shipbuilding & Eng. Co., Govan	1935	449	1935-1955		
MV	Wee Cumbrae	Wm. Denny & Bros., Dumbarton	1936	36	1935-1953		
MV	Arran Mail	Wm. Denny & Bros., Dumbarton	1936	137	1936-1951		
MV	MV Countess of Breadalbane	Wm. Denny & Bros., Dumbarton	1936	106	1936-1971		
TS	Marchioness of Graham	Fairfield Shipbuilding & Eng. Co., Govan	1936	585	1936-1958		
PS	Jupiter	Fairfield Shipbuilding & Eng. Co., Govan	1937	642	1937-1960		
PS	Juno	Fairfield Shipbuilding & Eng. Co., Govan	1937	642	1937-1939	Bombed and sunk whilst serving as HMS Helvellyn, 20 March 1941	
MV	Ashton	Wm. Denny & Bros., Dumbarton	1938	38	1938-1965		
MV	Leven	Wm. Denny & Bros., Dumbarton	1938	38	1938-1966		
PS	Glen Rosa (I)	J. & G. Thomson, Clydebank	1893	306	1938-1939	ex London, Midland and Scottish Railway	
TS	Glen Sannox (II)	Wm. Denny & Bros., Dumbarton	1925	664	1938-1954	ex London, Midland and Scottish Railway. Scrapped at Ghent in 1954.	
PS	Mercury	Fairfield Shipbuilding & Eng. Co., Govan	1934	621	1938-1939	ex London, Midland and Scottish Railway. She struck a mine and sank in the Irish Sea whilst serving as a minesweeper, 24 December 1940	
TS	King Edward	Wm. Denny & Bros., Dumbarton	1901	551	1943-1952	ex Williamson-Buchanan Steamers	
TS	Queen Mary II	Wm. Denny & Bros., Dumbarton	1933	870 later 1,014	1943-1973	ex Williamson-Buchanan Steamers, to CalMac in 1973	Laid up in harbour at Greenock in 1981. The funnel was later removed and replaced with two smaller ones, as the ship originally had.
MV	Skye	J Miller & Sons, St Monance	1922	8	1945-1950		
MV	Kyleakin (I)	Webster & Bickerton Ltd, Goole	1928	7	1945-1951		
MV	Moil	H. McLean & Sons, Renfrew	1936	15	1945-1954		
MV	Cuillin	Wm. Denny & Bros., Dumbarton	1942	24	1945-1954		
PS	Queen-Empress	Murdoch & Murray, Port Glasgow	1912	411	1946	De-requisitioned 1946 and returned to CSP (as successors to Williamson-Buchanan Steamers) but not recommissioned	
PS	Princess May	A. & J. Inglis, Glasgow	1899	256	1948-1953	Scrapped at Balloch in 1953.	
PS	Lucy Ashton	T. B. Seath & Co., Rutherglen	1888	224	1948-1949	Scrapped at Faslane in 1951.	
SS	Arran (I)	Ardrossan Dockyard Ltd, Ardrossan	1933	208	1949-1958	Renamed SS Kildonan (I) in 1952. Scrapped at Port Glasgow in 1958.	
SS	Minard	Scott & Sons, Bowling, Glasgow	1925	241	1949-1955	Scrapped at Port Glasgow in 1955.	
SS	Ardyne	Scott & Sons, Bowling, Glasgow	1928	242	1949-1955	Scrapped at Troon in 1955.	
MV	Coruisk (I)	Yorkshire Yacht Building Co., Bridlington	1947	19	1950-1954		
PS	Jeanie Deans	Fairfield Shipbuilding & Eng. Co., Govan	1931	814 (as modified)	1951-1965	ex British Transport Commission. Scrapped at Antwerp in 1968.	
DEPV	DEPV Talisman	A. & J. Inglis, Glasgow	1935	544	1951-1967	ex British Transport Commission	Right, at Inglis shipyard.
PS	Waverley	A. & J. Inglis, Glasgow	1946	693	1951-1973	ex British Transport Commission, to CalMac in 1973	
MV	Lochalsh (I)	Wm. Denny & Bros., Dumbarton	1951	24	1951-1958		
MV	Portree (I)	Wm. Denny & Bros., Dumbarton	1951	53	1952-1967		
PS	Maid of the Loch	A. & J. Inglis, Glasgow	1953	555	1953-1973	to CalMac in 1973	At Balloch Pier.
MV	Arran (II)	Wm. Denny & Bros., Dumbarton	1953	568	1953-1973	to CalMac in 1973	
MV	Maid of Argyll	A. & J. Inglis, Glasgow	1953	508	1953-1973	to CalMac in 1973	
MV	Maid of Ashton	Yarrow & Co., Scotstoun	1953	508	1953-1973		Leaving Blairmore.
MV	Maid of Cumbrae	Ardrossan Dockyard	1953	508	1953-1973		
MV	Maid of Skelmorlie	A. & J. Inglis, Glasgow	1953	508	1953-1973		
MV	Bute (VI)	Ailsa Shipbuilding Co., Troon	1954	569	1954-1973	to CalMac in 1973	
MV	Cowal (II)	Ailsa Shipbuilding Co., Troon	1954	569	1954-1973	to CalMac in 1973	
MV	Broadford (I)	Wm. Denny & Bros., Dumbarton	1954	57	1954-1973	to CalMac in 1973	
MV	Glen Sannox (III)	Ailsa Shipbuilding Co., Troon	1957	1,107	1957-1973	to CalMac in 1973. Grounded in 2000 off Saudi Arabia in this position.	
MV	Lochalsh (II)	Ailsa Shipbuilding Co., Troon	1957	60	1957-1972	Converted and renamed MV Scalpay (II) in 1972, to MacBrayne's in 1972, then to CalMac in 1973.	
MV	Kyleakin (II)	Ailsa Shipbuilding Co., Troon	1960	60	1960-1973	Converted and renamed MV Largs in 1972, to CalMac in 1973	
TS	Caledonian Princess	Wm. Denny & Bros., Dumbarton	1961	3,629	1961-1968	to British Rail (Sealink)	
MV	Portree (II)	James Lamont & Co, Port Glasgow	1965	63	1965-1973	to CalMac in 1973	
MV	Broadford (II)	James Lamont & Co, Port Glasgow	1966	64	1967-1973	to CalMac in 1973	
MV	Keppel	J Samuel White, Southampton	1961	214	1967-1973	ex British Railways (Eastern Region) MV Rose, to CalMac in 1973	
MV	Eilean Dhu	Unknown	1940	28	1969-1970		
MV	Dhuirnish	James Noble Ltd, Fraserburgh	1957	29	1969-1971		
MV	Eilean Buidhe	Dickie of Tarbert Ltd, Tarbert Loch Fyne	1963	34	1969-1971		
MV	Coruisk (II)	Ailsa Shipbuilding Company, Troon	1969	60	1969-1973	to CalMac in 1973	
ACV	HM2 - 011	Hovermarine Transport Ltd, Southampton	1970	12	1970-1972	Experimental hovercraft.	
MV	Caledonia (III)	A/S Langesunds Mek Versted, Norway	1966	1,157	1970-1973	ex Stena Line MV Stena Baltica, to CalMac in 1973. Scrapped in Turkey in 2005.	
MV	Kyleakin (III)	Newport Shipbuilding & Engineering Co., Wales	1970	225	1970-1973	to CalMac in 1973	
MV	Lochalsh (III)	Newport Shipbuilding & Engineering Co., Wales	1971	225	1971-1973	to CalMac in 1973	
MV	Kilbrannan	James Lamont & Co, Port Glasgow	1972	65	1972-1973	to CalMac in 1973	
