= Scalpay Bridge =

Bridge connecting the Isle of Scalpay to the Isle of Harris, Scotland

Scalpay Bridge Scottish Gaelic: Drochaid Scalpaigh
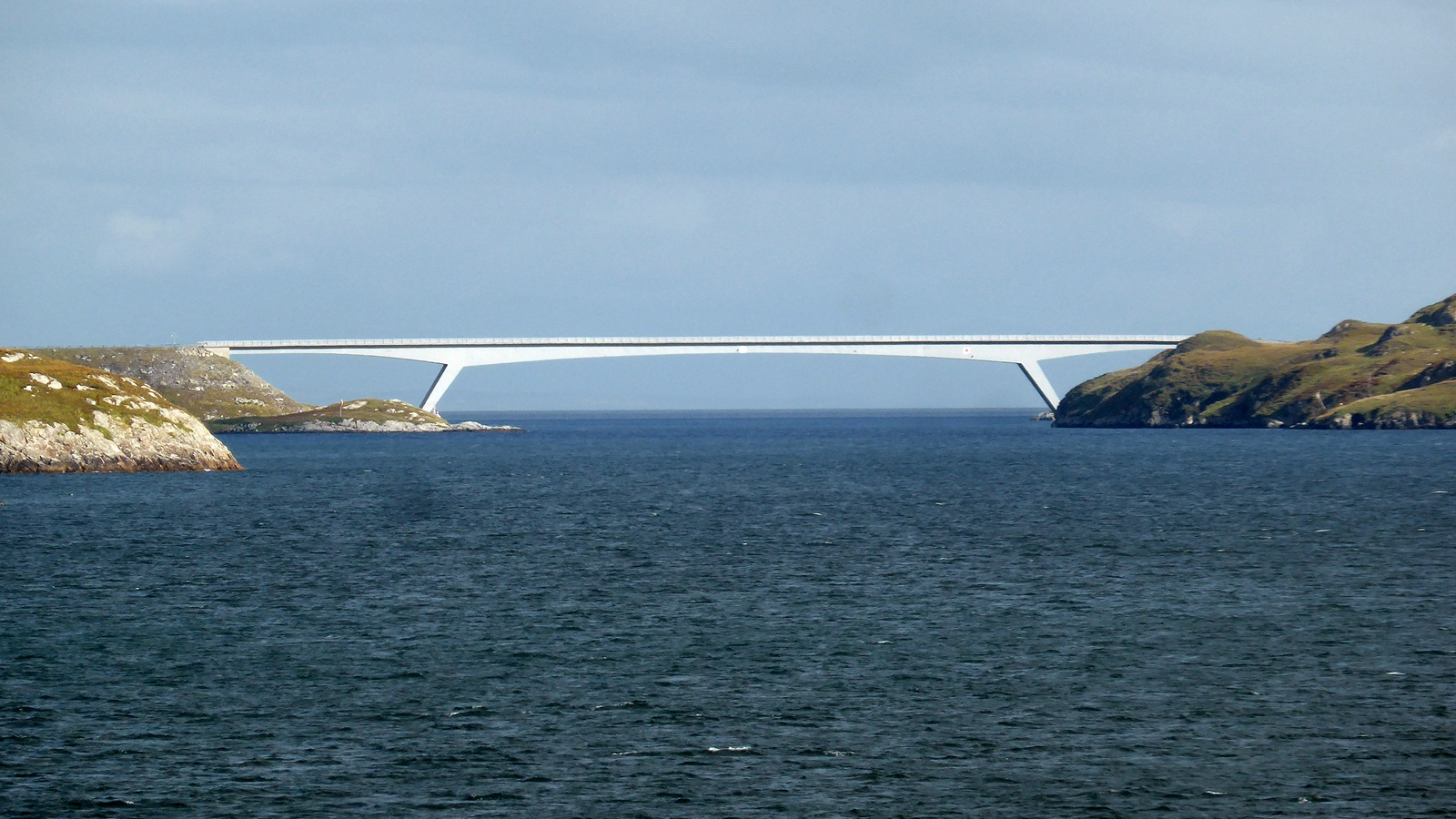
- The bridge seen from the west
- Coordinates: 57.88°N 6.69644°W
- Carries: A859
- Crosses: Sound of Scalpay
- Named for: Scalpay

Characteristics
- Material: Steel composite
- Total length: 300m
- Longest span: 170m
- No. of spans: Three

History
- Designer: Halcrow Crouch
- Construction cost: £6.4m
- Opened: 16 December 1997
- Inaugurated: 28 August 1998
- Replaces: Scalpay ferry

Location
- Interactive map of Scalpay Bridge

The Scalpay Bridge (Scottish Gaelic: Drochaid Scalpaigh) is a road bridge over the Sound of Scalpay in the Outer Hebrides of Scotland, connecting the island of Scalpay to Lewis and Harris, the largest island in Scotland. The crossing forms part of the A859.

The bridge replaced the ferry that traditionally went between Kyles Scalpay and Scalpay itself, crossing the Sound of Scalpay. The first person to cross the bridge was 103 year old Kirsty Morrison, at the time the oldest resident of Scalpay. However, it was officially opened in August 1998, when Prime Minister Tony Blair opened the bridge.

The bridge cost £6.4 million to build, and was in large part funded by the European Union.

== See also ==
- List of bridges in Scotland
