= MV Portree =

History

United Kingdom
- Name: MV Portree
- Namesake: Portree
- Owner: Caledonian Steam Packet Company
- Port of registry: Glasgow
- Route: 1965 - 1970: Kyle of Lochalsh - Kyleakin; 1970 - 1986: Colintraive - Rhubodach
- Builder: James Lamont & Co
- Cost: £30.000
- Yard number: 403
- Launched: 10 June 1965
- In service: 4 July 1965
- Out of service: Laid up 1986
- Fate: Sold to Mr Hooper of Sandback, 4 November 1987

General characteristics
- Type: Ferry
- Tonnage: 63 GT
- Length: 75.8 ft (23.1 m)
- Beam: 21 ft (6.4 m)
- Draught: 6.1 ft (1.9 m)
- Installed power: i) 2 Oil 4SCSA 4 cyl. 6” x 7”; ii) “ Oil 4SCSA 6 cyl. 4 ¾” x 6”
- Propulsion: i) Gleniffer Engines, Glasgow, (ii) Gardner Engines, Manchester
- Speed: 9 knots (17 km/h; 10 mph)
- Capacity: 60 passengers and 10 cars

MV Portree was a ferry, built in 1965 for the Skye crossing. In 1970, she was re-built and moved to the Kyles of Bute where she served until 1986.

== History ==
MV Portree was built to provide additional capacity on the Skye crossing. However, the service still struggled to keep up with increasing demand. Side-loading was slow and new bow-loading vessels were ordered for Skye. In 1969, STG acquired the Bute Berthing Co. Portree was identified for service at Colintraive and underwent a lengthy re-build.

== Layout ==
Portree was built with side ramps with angled ends and a deck-turntable. She had no passenger lounge. Her strange appearance was further increased by a forward wheelhouse, unlike previous Kyleakin ferries.

In 1970, she was converted to bow-loading, with a hydraulically operated bow ramp, hinged at three points and hanging from two long booms. She lost her side-ramps and deck-turntable and could then carry ten cars or one commercial vehicle and eight cars. Her vehicle deck was strengthened to carry 20-ton loads. The forward wheelhouse was removed and a raised navigation bridge was erected at the stern.

== Service ==
Initially joining a fleet of small vessels at Skye, Portree was displaced by the new Lochalsh and Kyleakin in 1971. She and MV Broadford served the Kyles of Bute crossing between Colintraive and Rhubodach until the arrival of MV Loch Riddon in November 1986.
