= PS Duchess of Fife (1903) =

Clyde-built paddle steamer (1903-1953)

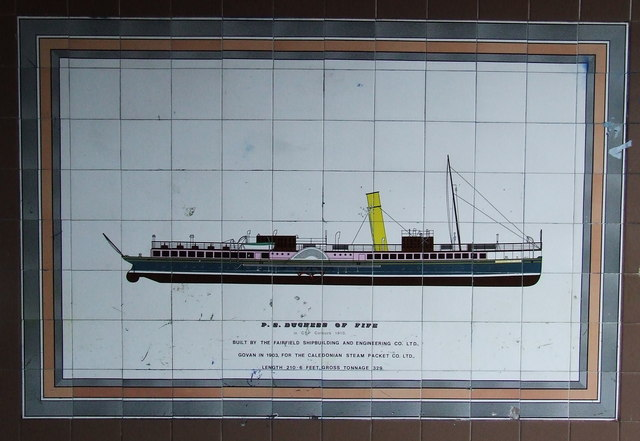
- A mosaic of the Duchess of Fife in a Greenock underpass

History
- Name: PS Duchess of Fife (1903–1953); HMS Duchess (1916–1919); HMS Duchess of Fife (1939–1945)
- Owner: Caledonian Steam Packet Company
- Operator: (United Kingdom) Caledonian Steam Packet Company (1903–1953); Royal Navy (1916–1919); Royal Navy (1939–1945)
- Builder: Fairfield Shipbuilding and Engineering Company, Glasgow
- Yard number: 432
- Launched: 9 May 1903
- Honours and awards: Dunkirk 1940
- Fate: Scrapped, 15 September 1953

General characteristics
- Type: Paddle steamer
- Tonnage: 336 GRT
- Length: 213.3 feet (65.0 m)
- Propulsion: Triple expansion diagonal
- Speed: 17 knots

PS Duchess of Fife was a paddle steamer built in 1903 for the Caledonian Steam Packet Company. She spent most of her career serving passenger routes in the Firth of Clyde and was requisitioned for use as a minesweeper during both World Wars. In 1940 she took part in the Dunkirk evacuation, rescuing a total of 1,633 allied troops.

After 50 years of service, She was sold for scrapping in September 1953.

== Construction ==
Duchess of Fife was built by the Fairfield Shipbuilding and Engineering Company in Govan, Glasgow, as Yard Number 432 and was launched on 9 May 1903. The design of her machinery was similar to that of her sister ship in the Caledonian Steam Packet Company, PS Duchess of Montrose.

== Service history ==
Duchess of Fife began her passenger service on the Gourock to Dunoon and Rothesay routes. In May 1916 she was requisitioned by the Admiralty and converted to a minesweeper for the remainder of World War I with her name shortened to HMS Duchess, and was allocated the pendant number PP533, where she served in the North Sea. She was returned to her owner in April 1919 and from 1937 she undertook sailings from Wemyss Bay to Millport and Kilchattan Bay.

She was requisitioned once again in 1939 upon the outbreak of World War II, this time retaining her full name as HMS Duchess of Fife, pendant number J115. She was part of the 12th Minesweeping Flotilla, based at Harwich.

Duchess of Fife took part in "Operation Dynamo", the Dunkirk evacuation, while under the command of Temporary Lieutenant J N Anderson of the Royal Naval Reserve. From 28 May, she undertook four crossings between Dunkirk and Ramsgate rescuing a total of 1,633 allied troops. Her final crossing was on 3 June with 300 French troops. She was later awarded a Royal Navy battle honour for her part in the operation. Later that year, Fife was transferred from Harwich to Kingston upon Hull, and from there went to the School of Minesweeping as a training ship at HMS Lochinvar in Port Edgar on the Firth of Forth.

She was refurbished by James Lamont & Co, Greenock, in 1945 and returned to civilian service. The last sailing of Duchess of Fife was on 6 June 1953, and she was sold for scrapping in September 1953 to Smith & Houston Ltd, Port Glasgow.
