= MV Broadford =

1966 Vehicle ferry

History

United Kingdom
- Name: MV Broadford
- Namesake: Broadford
- Owner: Caledonian Steam Packet Company
- Port of registry: Glasgow
- Route: 1967 - 1970: Kyle of Lochalsh - Kyleakin; 1971 - 1986: Colintraive - Rhubodach
- Builder: James Lamont & Co Engines: Gleniffer Engines Ltd., Glasgow
- Cost: £34,000
- Yard number: 405
- Launched: 5 October 1966
- In service: 7 January 1967
- Out of service: Laid up 1986
- Fate: Sold 4 November 1987 to Mr Hooper of Sandback

General characteristics
- Type: Ferry
- Tonnage: 63 GT
- Length: 75.8 ft (23.1 m)
- Beam: 21 ft (6.4 m)
- Draught: 6.1 ft (1.9 m)
- Installed power: Oil 4SCSA 4 cyl. 6” x 7”
- Propulsion: 2 prop
- Speed: 9 knots (17 km/h; 10 mph)
- Capacity: 60 passengers and 10 cars

MV Broadford was a vehicle ferry, built in 1966 for the Skye crossing. Superseded by larger, drive-through vessels, she was re-built and moved to the Kyles of Bute where she served until 1986.

== History ==
MV Broadford was built to provide additional capacity on the Skye crossing. However, the service still struggled to keep up with increasing demand. Side-loading was slow and larger, bow-loading vessels were ordered for Skye.

In 1969, STG acquired the Bute Berthing Co. and MV Portree was re-built and re-engined for service at Colintraive. Broadford remained for some months as spare vessel before joining her old consort on the Clyde. She underwent near-identical conversion at Lamont's but was not re-engined or shortened.

== Layout ==
Broadford was similar to her sister, Portree. She was built with side ramps with angled ends and a deck-turntable. Unlike Portree, her navigation bridge was placed aft for greater stability and her side-ramps were hydraulically operated and were significantly wider to accommodate large vehicles. She had no passenger lounge but in 1968, a very small shelter was fitted.

In 1971, she was converted to bow-loading, with a hydraulically operated bow ramp, hinged at three points and hanging from two long booms. She lost her side-ramps and deck-turntable and could then carry ten cars or one commercial vehicle and eight cars. Her vehicle deck was strengthened to carry 20-ton loads.

== Service ==
Initially joining a fleet of older, turntable vessels at Skye, Broadford was displaced by the new Lochalsh and Kyleakin in 1971. She served with MV Portree on the Kyles of Bute crossing between Colintraive and Rhubodach until the arrival of MV Loch Riddon in November 1986.

Broadford continued to ply the Clyde as Broadford Bay, a workboat without a vehicle-ramp. In 1988 she was named Boreford under the ownership of Divemex Ltd., Newtown Powys. She spent much of 2004 at Renfrew harbour.
