= J49 =

J49 may refer to:

- Augmented triangular prism
- HMS Aberdare (J49), a minesweeper of the Royal Navy
- Packard J49, a turbojet engine
