= MV Loch Alainn =

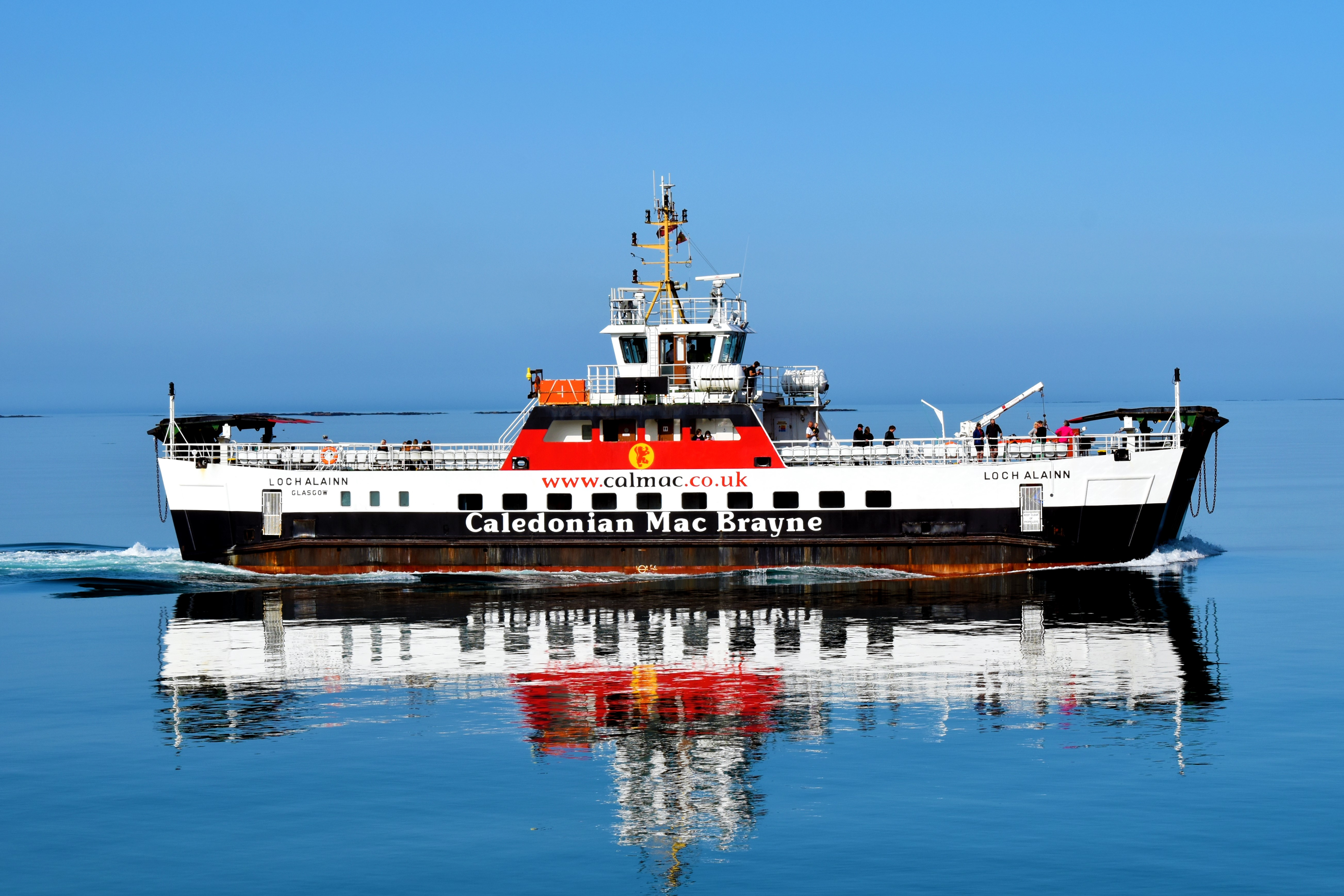
- Arriving at Eriskay slipway, September 2020.

History

United Kingdom
- Name: MV Loch Alainn
- Namesake: Lochaline, Morvern
- Owner: Caledonian Maritime Assets Limited
- Operator: Caledonian MacBrayne
- Port of registry: Glasgow
- Route: Ardmhor, Barra to Eriskay
- Builder: Buckie Shipbuilders Ltd
- Cost: £ 950,000
- Yard number: 110
- Launched: 4 April 1997
- Completed: 1997
- In service: 19 July 1997
- Identification: IMO number: 9147722; Callsign: MXZG2; MMSI number: 232003073
- Status: in service

General characteristics
- Class & type: ro-ro vehicle ferry
- Tonnage: 396 GT
- Length: 41.0 m (134 ft 6 in)
- Beam: 13.4 m (44 ft 0 in)
- Draft: 1.73 m (5 ft 8 in)
- Installed power: Machinery: Volvo Penta D13 diesel engines
- Propulsion: Voith Schneider propulsion units
- Speed: 10 kn (19 km/h)
- Capacity: 150 passengers and 20 cars
- Crew: 4

MV Loch Alainn (Scottish Gaelic: Loch Àlainn) is a Caledonian Maritime Assets Limited ferry built in 1997 and operated by Caledonian MacBrayne. Berthing problems on her intended route at Fishnish meant she began a decade of service at Largs. Since 2007, she has operated across the Sound of Barra.

== History ==
Loch Alainn was built for the new service from Fishnish to Lochaline. Launched in April 1997, she entered service in July. After just three weeks on her intended route, she developed a serious engine failure and was towed to dry dock on the Clyde, never to return to her intended route. In January 1999, she lost steering power approaching Largs slipway and was blown into the pier. Superficial damage required further time off for repairs.

== Layout ==
Loch Alainn is essentially a larger version of the 1996 MV Loch Bhrusda. Her car deck can take four lanes of cars, with a passenger lounge on the starboard side and an open deck directly above that. The bridge is suspended over the car deck.

== Service ==
Loch Alainn entered service in July 1997, on the Colintraive – Rhubodach route, allowing MV Loch Riddon to move to Largs. After a short while she moved to the Sound of Mull to take over her intended route, the Fishnish – Lochaline crossing, while MV Isle of Cumbrae moved south to Colintraive. With a slightly deeper draught than her predecessor, she had problems at low tide at Fishnish. Her ramps required modification soon after her arrival. After just three weeks, she broke down with a serious engine failure and was towed to dry dock on the Clyde.

After repairs, Loch Alainn re-entered service on the Colintraive service in February 1998. She then moved to Largs, becoming the main Cumbrae vessel from 14 May, with MV Loch Riddon joining her through the summers. For a decade, until June 2007, she provided this service, with relief for overhaul from MV Loch Tarbert.

She provided an emergency, round-the-clock service on the Tarbert - Portavadie crossing, following a landslide which completely blocked the A83 road north of Tarbert, leaving Kintyre isolated.

Early in 2007, she underwent successful berthing trials at Ardmhor and Eriskay in the Western Isles. Loch Alainn was replaced at Largs, by the new MV Loch Shira and left the Clyde on 2 July. Loch Alainn became the dedicated Sound of Barra ferry, replacing MV Loch Bhrusda on this increasingly busy route. In winter months, she became the Loch Class relief ferry, covering the overhauls of MV Loch Fyne (Lochaline - Fishnish), MV Loch Dunvegan (Colintraive - Rhubodach) and MV Loch Shira (Cumbrae).
