= MV Clew Bay Queen =

Car ferry built in 1972

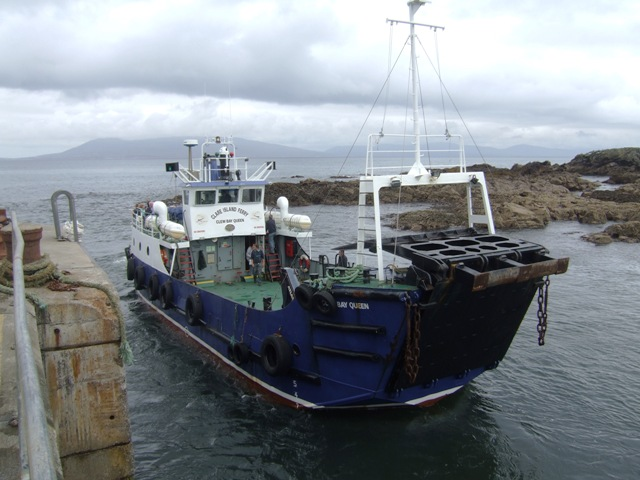
- MV Clew Bay Queen as Clare Island ferry

History

United Kingdom & Ireland
- Name: Kilbrannan; Arainn Mhor; Clew Bay Queen
- Namesake: Kilbrannan Sound; Clew Bay
- Operator: 1972: Caledonian MacBrayne, Gourock; 1992: Arranmore Ferry Service; 2008: Clare Island Ferry Co
- Port of registry: Glasgow
- Route: Claonaig - Lochranza; Scalpay, Outer Hebrides; 1992: Arranmore; Clare Island
- Builder: James Lamont & Co, Port Glasgow; Engines by: English Electric Diesels
- Yard number: 416
- Launched: 19 May 1972
- In service: 8 July 1972
- Identification: IMO number: 7217872; MMSI number: 250128460; Callsign: EI4100
- Status: in service

General characteristics
- Tonnage: 65 GT
- Length: 69 ft (21.0 m)
- Beam: 21 ft (6.4 m)
- Draught: 5 ft (1.5 m)
- Installed power: Twin diesel 2 × 4SCSA 6-cylinder engines, each 150 bhp (110 kW)
- Propulsion: Twin screw via reverse reduction gearboxes
- Speed: 8 kn (15 km/h)
- Capacity: 5 cars and 50 passengers
- Crew: 3

MV Clew Bay Queen is a car ferry at Clare Island. Built in 1972 as MV Kilbrannan for Caledonian MacBrayne, she operated mainly at Scalpay, Outer Hebrides until 1992. As Arainn Mhor, she then operated the Arranmore ferry in County Donegal.

== History ==
MV Kilbrannan was the first Small Island Class ferry built for Caledonian MacBrayne in 1972. The class gave good service, but have been overtaken by demand, with most now replaced by Loch class vessels.

In 1992, Kilbrannan was sold for service in Ireland and renamed Arainn Mhor. Further success here, led to larger vessels being purchased and she moved south as the Clare Island ferry in County Mayo. Her new identity as Clew Bay Queen was accompanied by a new livery of dark green and white.

== Layout ==
The eight Island Class ferries, built between 1972 and 1976, were designed by Messrs Burnett Corless. The simple design was based on World War II landing craft, with a two-part folding ramp at the bow. They had an open plan car deck incorporating a small turntable immediately aft and a sheltered area of passenger accommodation at the stern. The wheelhouse was above the passenger accommodation and the main mast above the ramp at the bow. A radar mast sat on top of the bridge, just forward of the small funnel and engine exhaust. Once in service, Kilbrannan and MV Morvern were found to be too short. The specification for the remaining six vessels was increased by 5 feet (1.5 metres).

== Service ==
After launch, MV Kilbrannan inaugurated a seasonal crossing of the Kilbrannan Sound, between Claonaig, Kintyre and Lochranza on Arran. This proved successful and the following year, she was replaced by her larger sister, MV Rhum. She was relief vessel until 1977, when she took over the Scalpay service, where she remained for 13 years. In 1990, Kilbrannan was replaced by MV Canna and resumed a relief role. New DTI restrictions meant her days were numbered. June to August 1991 saw her on charter to Burtonport, County Donegal for the Arranmore service. This was her longest voyage and made her the first CalMac vessel to operate outside Scotland. Her final Scottish service in 1992, was backing up Morvern at Iona and then relieving at Lochaline.

In Ireland, as Arainn Mhor she sailed on the fifteen-minute crossing between Burtonport and Arranmore. In 2008, she moved to County Mayo and was renamed Clew Bay Queen. As a multi purpose vessel, she provides a year-round cargo and vehicle service to Clare Island and Inishturk from Roonagh alongside several passenger ferries.
