= MV Loch Shira =

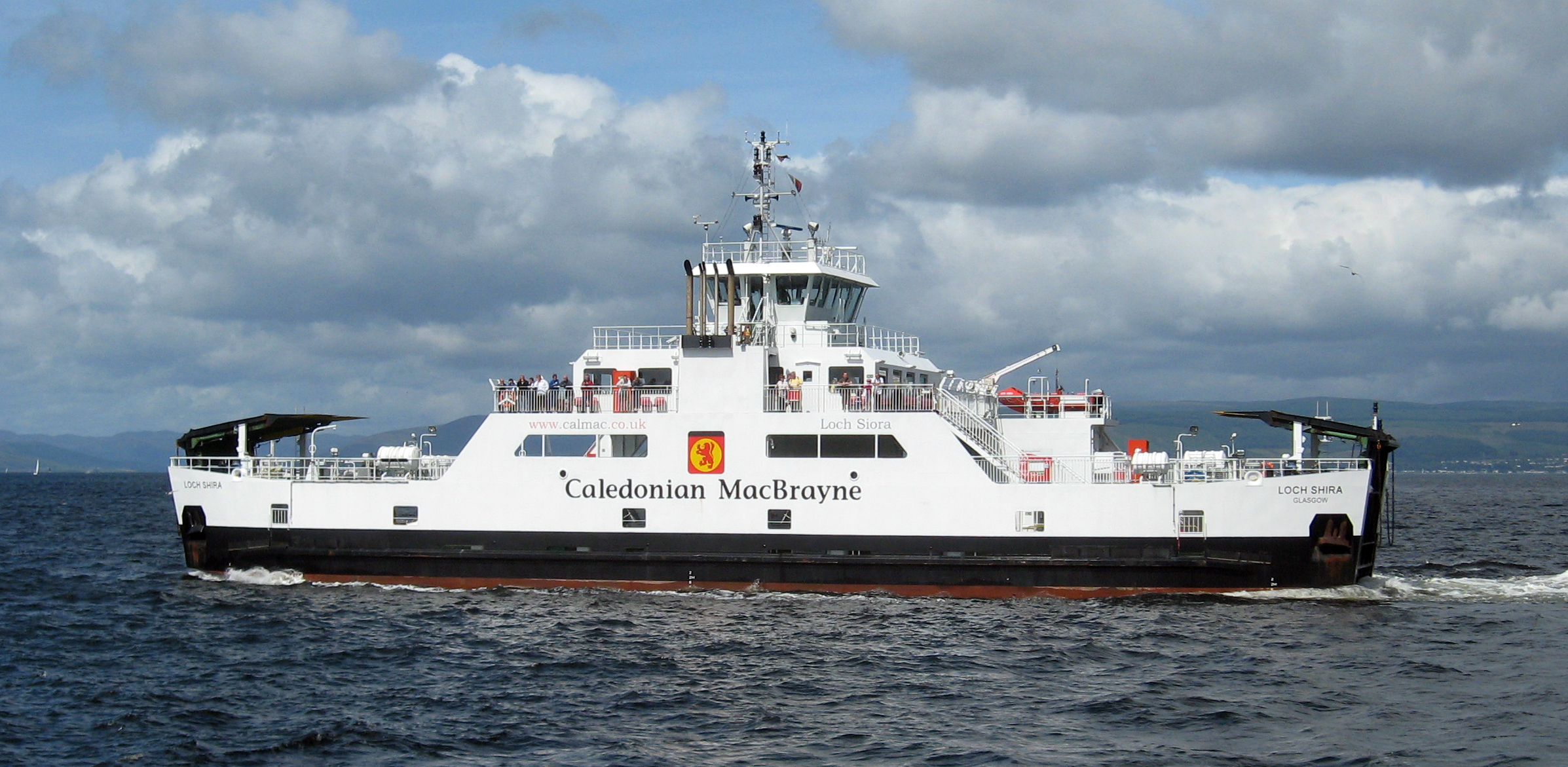
- MV Loch Shira heading out from Largs towards Great Cumbrae

History

United Kingdom
- Name: MV Loch Shira; Scottish Gaelic: Loch Siora
- Owner: Caledonian Maritime Assets
- Operator: Caledonian MacBrayne
- Port of registry: Glasgow
- Route: Largs - Cumbrae
- Builder: Ferguson Shipbuilders, Port Glasgow
- Cost: £5,800,000
- Yard number: 721
- Launched: 8 December 2006
- Maiden voyage: 2 June 2007
- Identification: IMO number: 9376919; MMSI number: 235053239; Callsign: MQPQ9
- Status: in service

General characteristics
- Tonnage: 1024 gt
- Length: 53.9 m
- Beam: 13.9 m
- Draught: 1.8 m
- Installed power: 2 × Caterpillar 3412 559 kW (750 hp) at 1800 rpm
- Propulsion: Voith 16 R5 rated at 540 kW at 625 rpm
- Speed: 10 kn (19 km/h)
- Capacity: 36 cars and 250 passengers

MV Loch Shira (Scottish Gaelic: Loch Siora) is a car ferry operating on the Largs to Cumbrae route on the Firth of Clyde in western Scotland. The vessel is operated by Caledonian MacBrayne.

== History ==
Built by Ferguson Shipbuilders and launched on Friday 8 December 2006, she entered service on Saturday 2 June the following year. The vessel has an absolute capacity of 32 cars and 250 passengers; however CalMac has stated that it is unlikely that more than 24 cars will be carried on the current route, in order to avoid traffic congestion both on the Isle of Cumbrae and at the Largs ferry terminal, where a busy junction is encountered just yards from leaving the boat.

On 2 April 2015 a Lego version of Loch Shira was published on the Lego ideas webpage. Calmac picked up on the Lego idea and issued a press release entitled "Block aid! CalMac ferry could become production Lego model with public support". By September of the following year the idea had not gained enough support and did not go into production.

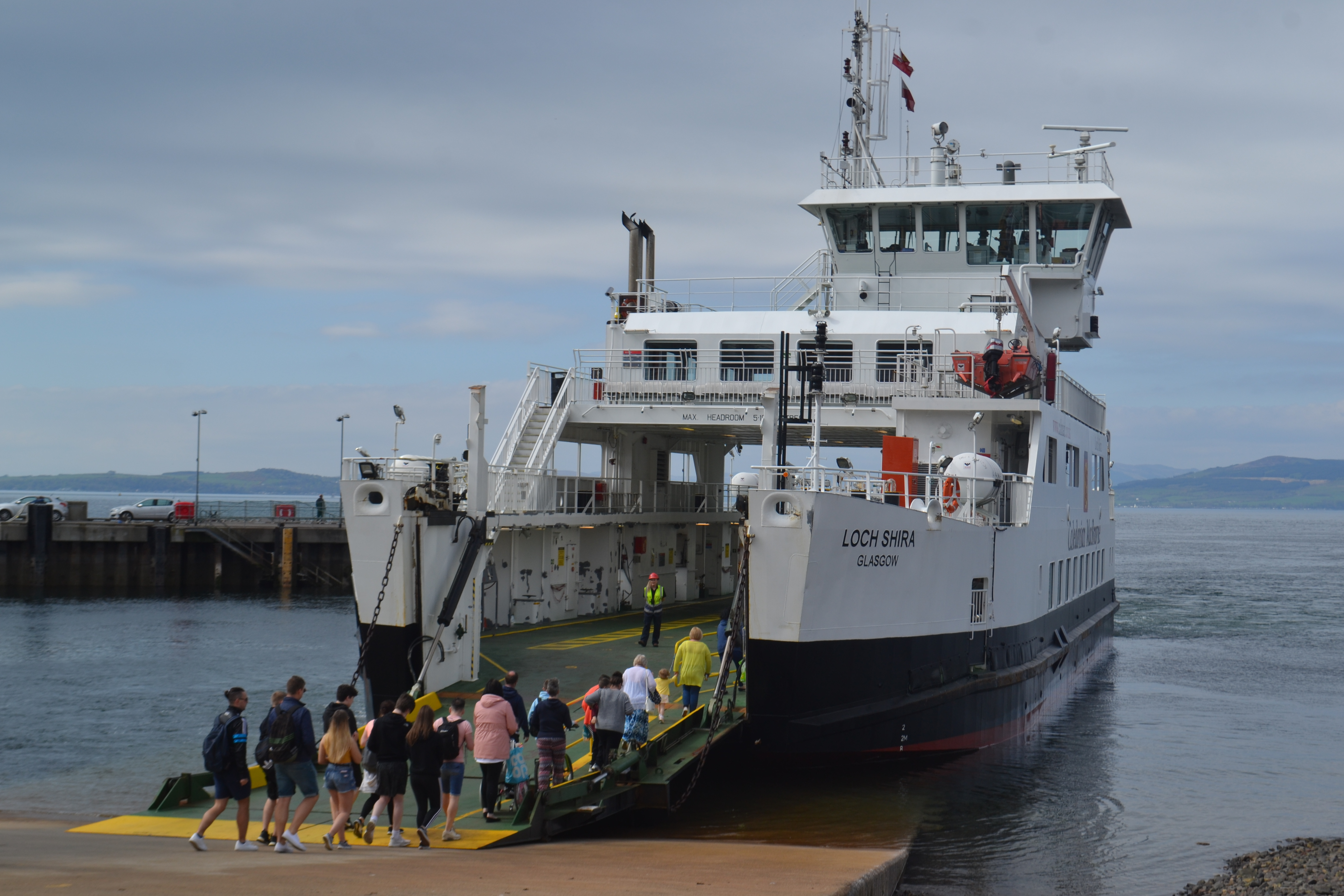
Passengers boarding at Largs.

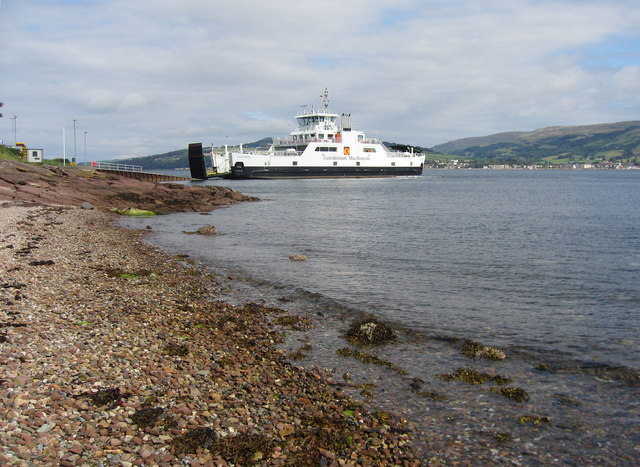
MV Loch Shira leaving Cumbrae Slip, Great Cumbrae.

== Name ==
The ferry is named after the sea loch next to Inveraray at the foot Glen Shira which drains the River Shira into Loch Fyne.

== Design ==
Loch Shira measures 53.9 m (176 ft 10 in) in length and has a beam of 13.90 m (45 ft 7 in). She has a single car deck divided into three lanes, with the central lane of sufficient width for two cars or one large commercial vehicle. There is a narrow passenger cabin at car deck level down the starboard side of the ship, with more spacious internal accommodation and open deck seating two storeys above this. The bridge sits atop the upper passenger lounge, and is offset to starboard.

In common with other Calmac "Loch Class" ferries, cars and passengers are loaded via folding ramps at either end of the vessel. These ramps make the only ship-to-shore contact during normal loading and unloading, with no ropes necessary to secure the ship. A Voith-Schneider propulsion system adds to this efficiency, giving the vessel excellent manoeuvrability.

== Service ==
Since her entry into service, Loch Shira has only operated on the service between Largs and Cumbrae. Upon entry into service, she replaced MV Loch Alainn, allowing the latter to move to service between Barra and Eriskay in the Outer Hebrides. She operates alongside MV Loch Riddon during the summer, and has been relieved by a number of vessels during her winter overhaul, including MV Loch Tarbert and MV Catriona.

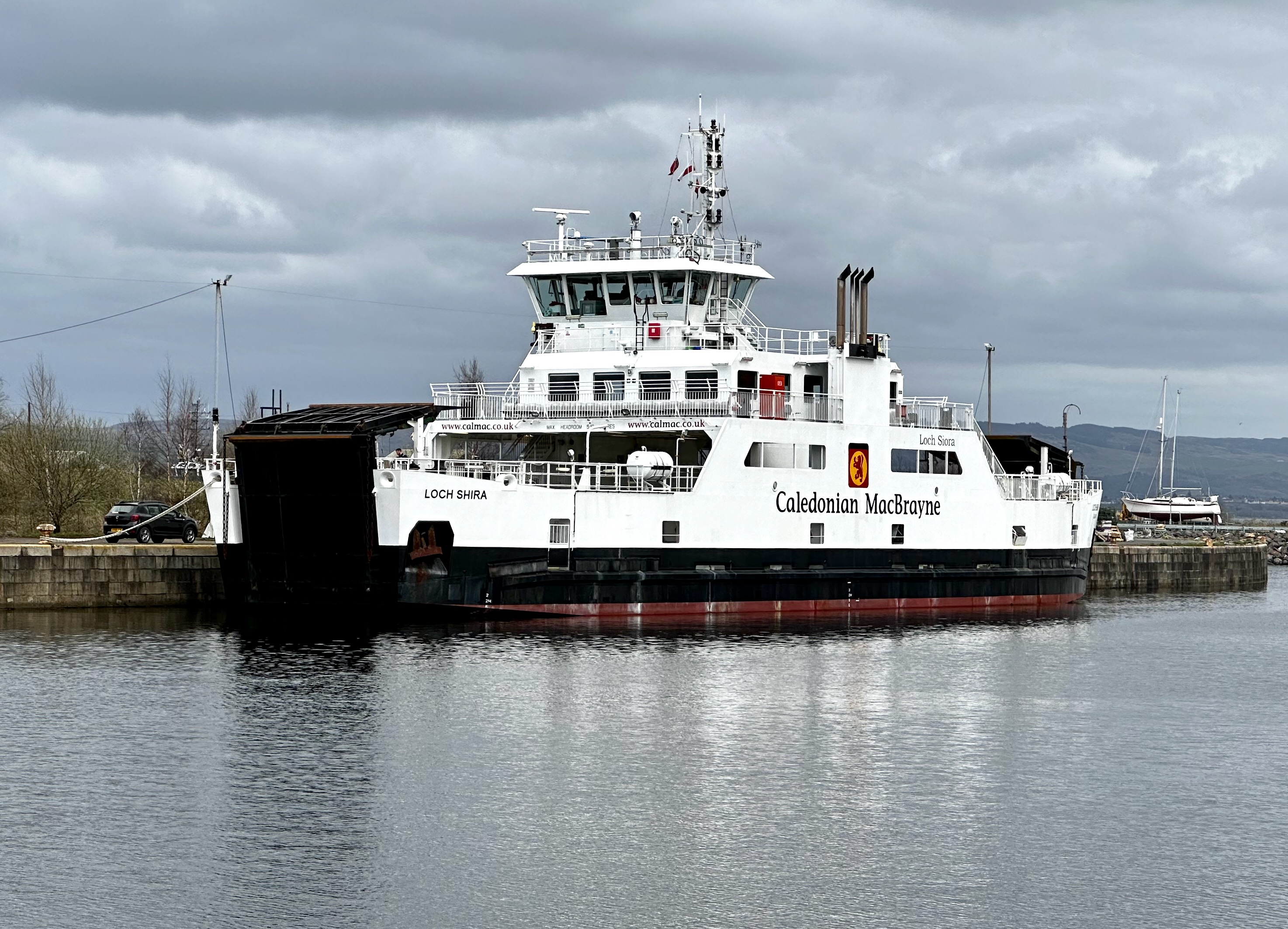
Loch Shira at James Watt Dock in Greenock, awaiting hinge repair.

In 2024, at a time when flood protection work in Millport meant a lot of heavy traffic, the hinges to both ramps on Loch Shira were damaged beyond repair, forcing her withdrawal from service on 5 April. CalMac attributed the problem to unidentified "large commercial vehicles" exceeding the ramp design loading, and replacement parts had to be made in Poland to get regulatory approval. During her absence, a reduced service was provided by various vessels, including Loch Tarbert, MV Isle of Cumbrae, MV Loch Bhrusda, and MV Loch Fyne. After initially docking at the James Watt Dock in Greenock, the ship was moved to Troon. By 24 May the parts were delivered and work put in hand, followed by "extensive sea and berthing trials across the Clyde area before a planned return to service on Wednesday August 7." By then there had been further problems with other vessel breakdowns, leading to three hour queues for the ferry at Largs. That afternoon, Loch Shira returned to service after four months and two days absence. Loch Tarbert was removed from service for ramp repairs, and Isle of Cumbrae gave short term cover.
