= MV Loch Fyne =

Caledonian MacBrayne car ferry

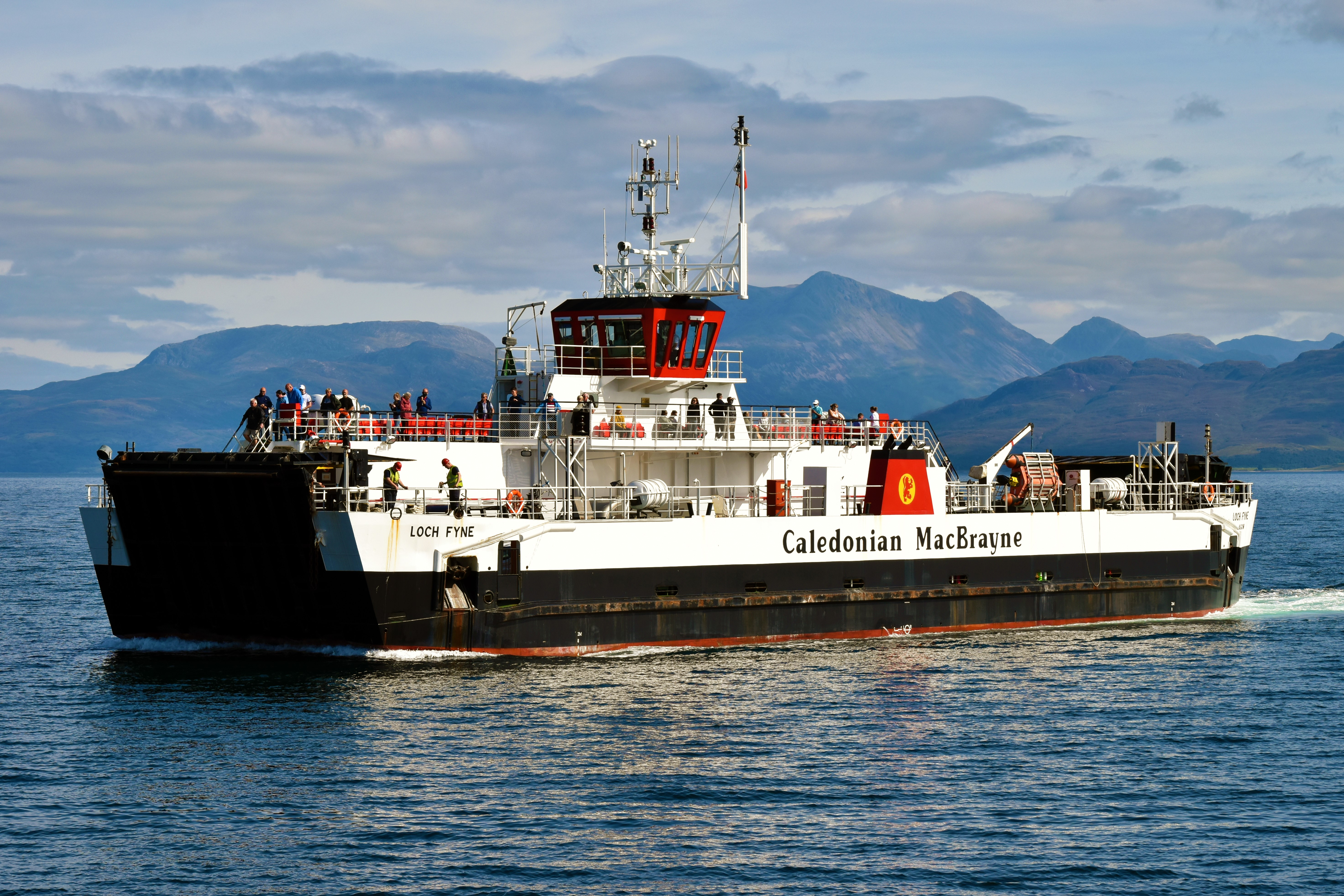
- Approaching Armadale, August 2021.

History

United Kingdom
- Name: MV Loch Fyne; Scottish Gaelic: Loch Fìne
- Owner: Caledonian Maritime Assets Limited
- Operator: Caledonian MacBrayne
- Port of registry: Glasgow
- Route: Spare / Relief
- Builder: Ferguson Shipbuilders, Port Glasgow
- Yard number: 602
- Launched: 12 June 1991
- In service: 2 August 1991
- Identification: IMO number: 9006411; Call sign:MNFF3
- Status: in service

General characteristics
- Tonnage: 549 GT; 224 DWT
- Length: 54.2 m (177 ft 10 in); 73.8 m (242 ft 2 in) overall
- Beam: 13.4 m (44 ft 0 in)
- Draught: 1.6 m (5 ft 3 in)
- Speed: 9 kn (17 km/h)
- Capacity: 200 passengers and 36 cars
- Crew: 4

MV Loch Fyne (Scottish Gaelic: Loch Fìne) is a Caledonian MacBrayne car ferry, owned by Caledonian Maritime Assets Limited, built in 1991 for the Isle of Skye crossing and now operating the Mallaig to Armadale route in western Scotland. She becomes a relief vessel in the winter, covering other vessels for annual overhaul and any breakdowns.

== History ==
Loch Fyne entered service at Kyle of Lochalsh on 12 September 1991, replacing the last of the old ferries, MV Kyleakin. Even at this time, it was known that the Skye Bridge was coming. On 16 October 1995, Loch Fyne and MV Loch Dunvegan, dressed with flags, gave the last ever car ferry runs across this narrow stretch of water.

Loch Fyne was laid up in James Watt Dock at Greenock for two years. No sale was completed and in 1997, CalMac prepared them for service once more. First, MV Loch Dunvegan was moved to the Colintraive - Rhubodach service. Then, on 27 September 1997, Loch Fyne was re-introduced to service and went to relieve the new MV Loch Alainn, which had suffered a major breakdown at Lochaline on the Sound of Mull. Loch Fyne proved successful and became the permanent vessel on Mull's secondary crossing, having sufficient capacity to cope with all but the busiest days there.

There was an earlier MacBrayne's diesel electric motor vessel of the same name, DEMV Lochfyne. She was built in 1931 at William Denny & Brothers Ltd, Dumbarton and later scrapped in 1974 at Dalmuir.

== Layout ==
Loch Fyne is a twin sister to MV Loch Dunvegan, both built for the Skye route. Passenger accommodation along the starboard side of the hull can cater for up to 250 persons, with lounges on two levels and an open deck above. The high sided design is prone to being caught by the wind. She initially had very wide ramps at both ends. These were first lengthened, to reduce the risk of long vehicles grounding, and later reduced in width and weight.

== Service ==
Loch Fyne was built for service between Kyle of Lochalsh and Kyleakin on Skye. She and MV Loch Dunvegan provided a 24-hour service there from 1991. With the opening of the Skye bridge in 1995, they were laid up and offered for sale. However, with a sale to a West African country falling through she, along with her sistership, were put back into service in 1997.

In 1997, Loch Fyne successfully relieved on the Lochaline to Fishnish route and became the regular vessel there until 2017. She also sailed between Mallaig and Armadale, relieving MV Coruisk.

In November 2016, Loch Fyne carried out further berthing trials on the Mallaig to Armadale route, causing rumours that she was going to take over from MV Lochinvar. These trials concluded that major modifications would be needed to the vessel and the linkspans at both ports. In January 2017, CalMac announced that they were going ahead with these modifications. Loch Fyne became the primary vessel on the Mallaig to Armadale route on 31 March 2017, with MV Lord of the Isles carrying out additional sailings between her roster to Lochboisdale.

After finishing her summer duties on the Mallaig - Armadale route in October 2023, she carried out relief on the Colintraive - Rhubodach route. A few days after completing the relief on the Kyles of Bute service, being taken over by the regular vessel MV Loch Dunvegan, she took over the Largs - Cumbrae route so that MV Loch Shira can undergo repairs to her forward ramp. In November 2023, Loch Fyne also carried out relief on the Tarbert - Portavadie and Lochranza routes in lieu of MV Catriona.

In June 2024, owing to the withdrawal of service of Loch Shira, Loch Fyne sailed south to take up service between Largs and Cumbrae, partnering MV Loch Tarbert.

On 29 July 2024, Loch Fyne was removed from service to undergo investigations into her Voith unit, it was later confirmed that she would remain out of service for approximately four weeks to undergo repairs.

On 4 September 2024, Loch Fyne returned to service as the second vessel on the Largs - Cumbrae route, operating alongside MV Loch Shira.

On 4 October 2024, Loch Fyne took over the Colintraive - Rhubodach crossing while the regular vessel MV Loch Dunvegan was away on her annual overhaul.
