= HMS Alresford =

Minesweeper of the Royal Navy

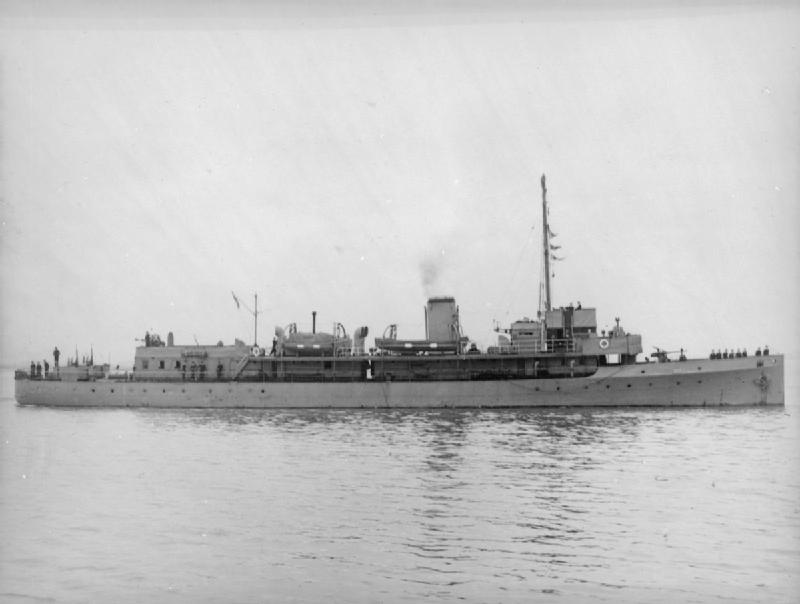
- HMS Alresford in 1942

History

United Kingdom
- Name: HMS Alresford
- Builder: Ailsa Shipbuilding Company, Troon
- Launched: 17 January 1919
- Commissioned: 25 May 1919
- Identification: Pennant number = J06 / N06
- Fate: Sold 13 March 1947 for scrap Dohmen & Habets, Liege

General characteristics
- Class & type: Hunt-class minesweeper, Aberdare sub-class
- Displacement: 800 long tons (813 t)
- Length: 213 ft (65 m) o/a
- Beam: 28 ft 6 in (8.69 m)
- Draught: 7 ft 6 in (2.29 m)
- Installed power: 2 × Yarrow boilers; 2,200 ihp (1,600 kW)
- Propulsion: 2 shafts; 2 vertical triple-expansion steam engines
- Speed: 16 knots (30 km/h; 18 mph)
- Range: 1,500 nmi (2,800 km; 1,700 mi) at 15 knots (28 km/h; 17 mph)
- Complement: 74
- Armament: 1 × QF 4-inch (102 mm) gun; 1 × 76 mm (3.0 in) anti-aircraft gun

HMS Alresford was a Hunt-class minesweeper of the Aberdare sub-class built for the Royal Navy during World War I. She was not finished in time to participate in the First World War and survived the Second World War to be sold for scrap in 1947.

== Design and description ==
The Aberdare sub-class were enlarged versions of the original Hunt-class ships with a more powerful armament. The ships displaced 800 long tons (810 t) at normal load. They measured 231 feet (70.4 m) long overall with a beam of 26 feet 6 inches (8.1 m). They had a draught of 7 feet 6 inches (2.3 m). The ships' complement consisted of 74 officers and ratings.

The ships had two vertical triple-expansion steam engines, each driving one shaft, using steam provided by two Yarrow boilers. The engines produced a total of 2,200 indicated horsepower (1,600 kW) and gave a maximum speed of 16 knots (30 km/h; 18 mph). They carried a maximum of 185 long tons (188 t) of coal which gave them a range of 1,500 nautical miles (2,800 km; 1,700 mi) at 15 knots (28 km/h; 17 mph).

The Aberdare sub-class was armed with a quick-firing (QF) four-inch (102 mm) gun forward of the bridge and a QF twelve-pounder (76.2 mm) anti-aircraft gun aft. Some ships were fitted with six- or three-pounder guns in lieu of the twelve-pounder.

== Construction and career ==
HMS Alresford was built by the Ailsa Shipbuilding Company at their shipyard in Troon, Ayrshire, as Yard number 338, and was launched on 17 January 1919. The ship was commissioned on 13 May 1919, and was completed on 26 May 1919.

In August 1919, Alresford was listed as attached to the navigation school at Portsmouth, HMS Dryad, with a special complement. She remained attached to the Navigation school in December 1920. Alresford continued to carry out navigation training at Portsmouth throughout the inter-war years, and remained attached to the navigation school in August 1939, on the eve of the Second World War.

Alresford took part in Operation Dynamo.

On 19 August 1942, Alresford, now part of the 9th Minesweeping Flotilla, took part in the Dieppe Raid. She crossed the English Channel as part of Group 13, with the minesweeper leading seven Free-French sub chasers carrying Royal Marine Commandos. The sub chasers transferred their troops to seven LCAs and LCMs, but an attempt to land the commandos on White Beach, supported by the sub-chasers, was abandoned owing to heavy German fire. Alresford took a badly damaged Landing craft tank (LCTs) under tow, and, together with the destroyer Garth, escorted two groups of LCTs that had not landed their tanks back to Britain.

Alresford was laid up in reserve at Milford Haven in January 1945, and on 13 March 1947 was sold to Dohmen & Habets of Belgium.
