= PS Ivanhoe =

History

United Kingdom
- Name: PS Ivanhoe
- Owner: 1880-1897 Firth of Clyde Steam Packet Company; 1897–1911: Caledonian Steam Packet Company; 1911-1914 Newlands and Campbell, Glasgow; 1914-1920 Turbine Steamers Ltd
- Operator: Owners
- Port of registry: Glasgow, (United Kingdom)
- Builder: D. and W. Henderson and Company
- Yard number: 208
- Launched: 25 February 1880
- Out of service: 1919
- Fate: Broken up in 1920

General characteristics
- Tonnage: 282 gross register tons (GRT)
- Length: 225 ft 4 in (68.68 m)
- Beam: 22 ft 2 in (6.76 m)
- Draught: 8 ft 3 in (2.51 m)
- Installed power: 123 ihp (92 kW)

PS Ivanhoe was a steamer launched in 1880 at the D. and W. Henderson and Company shipyard, Meadowside, Glasgow, for the Firth of Forth Steam Packet Company for service on the River Clyde.

== History ==
She was christened by Mrs. George Bell and launched on 25 February 1880. She comprised two salons, over which extended the promenade deck, in length about 180 feet (55 m). Underneath the principal saloon was a dining saloon with accommodation for about 100 passengers. She was inaugurated as passenger vessel supporting the temperance movement offering alcohol-free services on the Greenock and Helensburgh to Arran service.

The company succumbed to competition from steamers operated by the Glasgow and South Western Railway and in 1897 the vessel was sold to the Caledonian Steam Packet Company who installed bars and sold alcohol for the first time.

In 1894 she was chartered to provide passenger services between Liverpool and Manchester on the Manchester Ship Canal but this did not prove commercially viable, so she returned to the River Clyde.

She was sold again in 1911 to Newlands and Campbell of Glasgow.

During the First World War she was retained on the Clyde, whilst other ships were requisitioned. She was put up for sale in August 1920 but was broken up a few months later.
