= James Lamont & Co =

Scottish shipbuilder

- Company type: Private
- Industry: Shipbuilding
- Founded: 1870
- Headquarters: Greenock, Scotland

James Lamont & Co was a shipbuilder and ship-repairer on the Clyde.

== History ==
James Lamont & Co were established as a ship repairer at East India Harbour, Greenock, in 1870. After the collapse of the Clyde Shipbuilding and Engineering Company Ltd, Lamonts purchased the Castle Yard at Port Glasgow in 1929. Clyde Shipbuilding had been at the Castle yard from 1900 from which they launched about 100 ships. Before that, Blackwood & Gordon built 202 ships at the yard from 1860. Lamont did not build ships there until 1938, reverting to repairs during the war and becoming a full shipyard again once hostilities were over.

In 1979 the company announced that it was to give up shipbuilding and concentrate on repair work, which had been expanded by the opening of a 113m dry-dock in 1966.

== Ships built ==
Over 70 ships, including for the Associated Humber Lines, Darlington, Harrogate and Selby

Yard No	Name	Launch	Type	Notes
375	Eilean Dubh	1951	Kessock ferry	Ross & Cromarty County Council
388	Ardgerry	1957	coaster	P MacCallum & Sons Greenock
389	Wrestler	1957	tug	Steel & Bennie Ltd
390	Campaigner	1957	tug	Steel & Bennie Ltd
391	Royal Daffodil II	1957	cruise	Wallasey Local Government Board, Liverpool
395	Selby	1959	coaster	Associated Humber Lines
403	MV Portree	1965	Skye ferry	Caledonian Steam Packet Company
405	MV Broadford	1966	Skye ferry	Caledonian Steam Packet Company
407	Flying Falcon	1967	tug	Clyde Shipping Co Ltd
408	James Lamey	1967	tug	J. H. Lamey Ltd of Liverpool +several other tugs
411	Warrior	1969	tug	Steel & Bennie Ltd
412	Dalmarnock	1970	Sludge carrier	Glasgow City Council
416	MV Kilbrannan	1972	landing-craft type ferry	Caledonian Steam Packet Company
417	MV Morvern	1972	landing-craft type ferry	Caledonian MacBrayne
418	MV Jupiter	1973	ferry	Caledonian MacBrayne
419	MV Juno	1974	ferry	Caledonian MacBrayne
420	MV Bruernish	1973	landing-craft type ferry	Caledonian MacBrayne
421	MV Coll	1973	landing-craft type ferry	Caledonian MacBrayne
422	MV Rhum	1973	landing-craft type ferry	Caledonian MacBrayne
423	MV Eigg	1974	landing-craft type ferry	Caledonian MacBrayne
424	MV Canna	1975	landing-craft type ferry	Caledonian MacBrayne
425	MV Raasay	1976	landing-craft type ferry	Caledonian MacBrayne
431	Garroch Head	1977	Sludge carrier	Glasgow City Council
432	Divis 11	1978	Sludge carrier	Belfast City Corporation - the yard's final build.
