= Ailsa Shipbuilding Company =

Scottish shipbuilding company

- Type: Private
- Industry: Shipbuilding
- Founded: 1885
- Defunct: 2000
- Fate: Closed
- Headquarters: Troon and Ayr, Ayrshire, Scotland

Ailsa Shipbuilding Company was a Scottish shipbuilding company based in Troon and Ayr, Ayrshire.

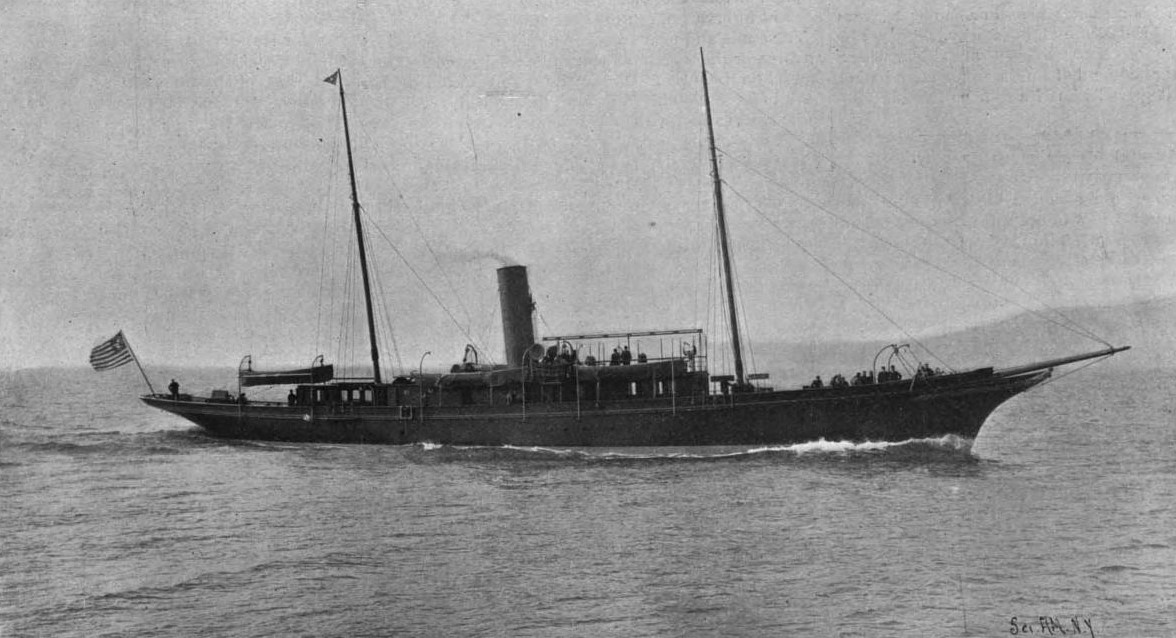
Steam yacht Andria. Launched 18 Feb 1897

== History ==
The company was founded in 1885 by Archibald Kennedy, 3rd Marquess of Ailsa, along with Peter James Wallace and Alexander McCredie.

In 1902 the Ailsa yard fitted out the polar exploration ship Scotia for the Scottish National Antarctic Expedition of 1902–04. The Scotia sailed from Troon for the South Atlantic on 2 November 1902.

The company built paddle steamers for various companies around the UK, including the New Medway Shipping Company's PS Medway Queen, the only estuary paddle steamer left in the UK.

During the First World War, the shipyard built the Royal Navy's first paddle minesweeper of the Racecourse class.

During the Second World War, Ailsa built vessels for the Navy, including several Bangor-class minesweepers.

In 1977 Ailsa was nationalised and subsumed into the British Shipbuilders Corporation. In 1981, the assets of Ailsa and those of Ferguson Brothers were merged to form Ferguson-Ailsa, Limited. This grouping was split and privatised in 1986, the Ailsa yard being acquired by Perth Corporation as Ailsa & Perth, Limited.

Ailsa stopped large-scale shipbuilding in 1988 and finally closed as a shipbuilder in 2000. The yard has recently been used for ship repair work and the fabrication of large concrete sections for a pier improvement programme in Grimsay, Western Isles.

== Ships built by Ailsa Shipbuilding Company ==
Yard No	Name	Type	Launch	Notes
4	SS Lady Ailsa	Cargo ship	4 January 1888	renamed Belgian Prince
53	SV Dalblair	Steel sailing vessel 3-masted barque	1895	Lost in a cyclone off Mauritius in 1902
68	SS Tobruk	Italian Navy gunboat	1897	Built as yacht Evona - since 1912 RN Tobruk
70	SS Hebrides	Passenger ship	24 March 1898	
78	SS Katoomba	Patrol ship	28 December 1898	renamed USS Emeline
82	SS The Marchioness	General Cargo Coaster	22 August 1899	Sunk by a U-Boat 1916
105	MY Triton	Motor yacht	1902	now Madiz
121	HMS Warrior	Yacht	4 February 1904	Requisitioned by Admiralty 1917 and 1939; at Dunkirk evacuation; sank off Portland after air attack 11 July 1940
183	SS Queen of the Lake	Steamer	7 July 1907	For the Loch Tay Steamboat Company. Scrapped 1950.
294	HMS Aphis	Gunboat	15 September 1915	
297	HMS Ascot	Minesweeper	26 January 1916	
298	HMS Atherstone	Minesweeper	4 April 1916	
299	HMS Chelmsford	Minesweeper	14 June 1916	
332	HMS James Cosgrove	Minesweeper	5 March 1919	
334	HMS Aberdare	Minesweeper	29 April 1918	
335	HMS Abingdon	Minesweeper	11 June 1918	
336	HMS Albury	Minesweeper	21 November 1918	
338	HMS Alresford	Minesweeper	17 January 1919	
345	HMS Appledore	Minesweeper	15 August 1919	
388	PS Medway Queen	Paddle steamer	23 April 1924	
396	SS Scillonian	Passenger vessel	17 November 1925	
432	HMS Rye	Minesweeper	19 August 1940	
437	HMS Hythe	Minesweeper	4 September 1941	
439	HMS Clacton	Minesweeper	19 December 1941	
452	HMS Loch Tarbert	Frigate	19 October 1944	
453	HMS Loch Veyatie	Frigate	8 October 1945	
473	HMS Bottisham	Minesweeper	16 February 1953	
474	HMS Brantingham	Minesweeper	4 December 1953	
480	MV Cowal	Ferry	20 January 1954	
481	MV Bute	Ferry	28 September 1954	
483	HMS Elsenham	Minesweeper	25 May 1955	
484	HMS Etchingham	Minesweeper	9 December 1957	
487	HMS Ockham	Minesweeper	12 May 1959	
488	HMS Ottringham	Minesweeper	22 January 1958	
496	MV Glen Sannox	Ferry	30 April 1957	
499	MV Lochalsh (II)	Ferry	1957	renamed Scalpay
500	MV Container Enterprise	Container ship	19 February 1959	subsequently Iscar I , Sea Container, Isamar, Freedom Express; Scuttled 2003
501	MV Container Venturer	Container ship	14 August 1959	subsequently Trupial, Sea Mist, Skorpion I, Jeanny Cay II
505	MV Freshwater	Car ferry	1959	Sold to Western Ferries as Sound of Seil
506	MV Slieve Donard	Cargo ship	1 October 1959	
507	MV St. Clair	Passenger	29 April 1960	
508	MV Cerdic Ferry	Ferry	16 February 1961	
509	MV Doric Ferry	Ferry	27 October 1961	
510	MV Kyleakin	Ferry	1961	renamed Largs
514	MV Themara	Yacht	1962	
517	MV Bowbelle	Aggregate dredger	11 May 1964	Involved in the sinking of the Marchioness on the River Thames in 1989. Renamed Billo in 1992 and Bom Rei in 1996. Sank off the coast of Madeira in March 1996.
529	MV Glenachulish	Ferry	1969	
530	MV Iona	Ferry	22 January 1970	renamed Pentalina-B
531	MV Coruisk	Ferry	26 June 1969	
533	MV Mona's Queen	Diesel ferry	22 December 1971	
547	MS Lady of Mann	Ferry	4 December 1975	renamed Panagia Soumela
551	MV Isle of Cumbrae	Ferry	23 December 1976	
552	MV Saturn	Ferry	30 June 1977	
553	LT Relume	Lighthouse Tender	5 July 1978	
554	MV Lochmor	Ferry	11 June 1979	
555	MV Goleniow	Bulk Carrier	9 April 1979	
556	MV Cambourne	Suction Hopper Dredger	12 June 1980	
557	MT Traguair	Gas Tanker	21 August 1981	Her forward part was built at Ferguson's, Port Glasgow, yard 485. Both were launched on the same day, being completed at Ferguson's.
558	MV Star Vega	Offshore Supply Vessel	1 November 1982	
559	MT Tarihiko	LPG Tanker	29 March 1983	
560	MV Simba II	Firefighting Tug	21 October 1983	
561	MV Nguvu II	Firefighting Tug	31 January 1984	
562	MV Chui	Firefighting Tug	5 April 1984	
563	MV Duma	Firefighting Tug	28 June 1984	
564	MV Faru	Firefighting Tug	5 October 1984	
565	MV M.V.A.	Hopper Barge	11 February 1985	
566	MV Fivla	Ferry	12 February 1985	
567	MV Fort Resolution	Offshore Supply Vessel	17 October 1985	
568	MV Fort Reliance	Offshore Supply Vessel	28 March 1986	Not delivered until 1989, by Ferguson Shipbuilders Ltd.
569	MV Seaforth Earl	Offshore Supply Vessel	3 October 1985	
570	MV Seaforth Baronet	Offshore Supply Vessel	7 March 1986	
571	RV Corystes	Research vessel	11 August 1986	
573	MV Graemsay	Ferry	1996	
574	FV Aeolus	Fishing Vessel Trawler	1997	First fishing vessel built by Ailsa, Troon.
575	FV Russa Taign	Fishing Vessel Trawler	November 1997	
576	FV Solstice II	Fishing Vessel Trawler	17 November 1997	
577	FV Atlantic Challenge	Fishing Vessel Trawler	12 September 1998	
578	HMS Tracker	Naval Patrol & Training Vessel	January 1998	
579	HMS Raider	Naval Patrol & Training Vessel	1997	
582	HMS A.01	Naval Landing Craft	30 July 1999	Modified by BAE systems, Govan after Ailsa shipyard closed, including the build of the remaining of the class of 10 vessels for the Royal Navy.
583	HMS A.02	Naval Landing Craft	25 November 1999	Modified by BAE systems, Govan after Ailsa shipyard closed, including the build of the remaining of the class of 10 vessels for the Royal Navy.
592	MV Lochnevis	Ferry	8 May 2000	
Sources: Miramar, Clyde Ships

== Archives ==
The Ailsa Shipbuilding Company archives are maintained by the University of Glasgow Archives Services.
