= HMS Aberdare =

Minesweeper of the Royal Navy

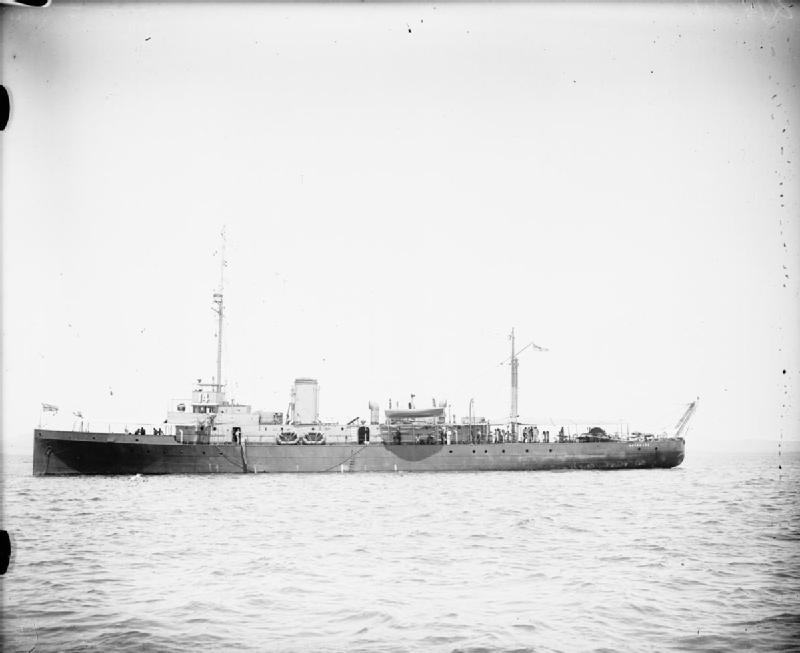
- Aberdare in 1919

History

United Kingdom
- Name: Aberdare
- Namesake: Aberdare
- Operator: Royal Navy
- Ordered: March 1916
- Builder: Ailsa Shipbuilding Company, Troon, Ayrshire
- Cost: £60,000
- Laid down: 1 January 1917
- Launched: 29 April 1918
- Commissioned: 3 October 1918
- Fate: Sold 13 March 1947

General characteristics
- Class & type: Hunt-class minesweeper, Aberdare sub-class
- Displacement: 800 long tons (813 t)
- Length: 213 ft (64.9 m) o/a
- Beam: 28 ft 6 in (8.7 m)
- Draught: 7 ft 6 in (2.3 m)
- Installed power: 2 × Yarrow boilers; 2,200 ihp (1,600 kW)
- Propulsion: 2 shafts; 2 triple-expansion steam engines
- Speed: 16 knots (30 km/h; 18 mph)
- Range: 1,500 nmi (2,800 km; 1,700 mi) at 15 knots (28 km/h; 17 mph)
- Complement: 74
- Armament: 1 × QF 4-inch (102 mm) gun; 1 × 12 pdr (76 mm (3 in)) anti-aircraft gun

HMS Aberdare was the name ship of her sub-class of the Hunt-class minesweepers built for the Royal Navy during World War I. She survived both World Wars to be scrapped in 1947.

== Design and description ==
The Aberdare sub-class were enlarged versions of the original Hunt-class ships with a more powerful armament. The ships displaced 750 long tons (760 t) at normal load and 930 long tons (940 t) at full load. They measured 231 feet (70.4 m) long overall with a beam of 28 feet 6 inches (8.7 m) and a draught of 7 feet 6 inches (2.3 m). The ships' complement consisted of 74 officers and ratings.

The ships had two vertical triple-expansion steam engines, each driving one shaft using steam provided by two Yarrow boilers. The engines produced a total of 2,200 indicated horsepower (1,600 kW) and gave a maximum speed of 16 knots (30 km/h; 18 mph). They carried a maximum of 185 long tons (188 t) of coal which gave them a range of 1,500 nautical miles (2,800 km; 1,700 mi) at 15 knots (28 km/h; 17 mph).

The Aberdare sub-class was armed with a quick-firing (QF) four-inch (102 mm) gun forward of the bridge and a QF twelve-pounder (3-inch (76.2 mm)) anti-aircraft gun aft. Some ships were fitted with six- or three-pounder guns in lieu of the twelve-pounder.

== Construction and career ==
HMS Aberdare, named after the eponymous Welsh town, was built by the Ailsa Shipbuilding Company at its shipyard in Troon, Ayrshire. She was launched on 29 April 1918, and completed on 3 October 1918.

Aberdare was sent to the Mediterranean Sea on commissioning, joining the British Aegean Squadron, but was paid off into reserve at Malta on 26 November 1919.

Aberdare was placed into reserve at Singapore on 4 April 1937, and in February 1939, remained in reserve as part of the 2nd Minesweeping Flotilla at Singapore. In 1943 Aberdare was part of the 2nd M/S Flotilla based at Alexandria. During that year the flotilla swept minefields outside Mersa Matruh and other harbours in Libya, and off Malta and the south coast of Sicily. From January to September 1944 the flotilla was engaged in sweeping an inshore channel from Taranto round the heel of Italy and thence up the Adriatic coast as far north as Ancona.

In October 1944, it was reported that the old minesweepers of the 2nd Flotilla, including Aberdare, would shortly be paid off. From 1945 (Note: While Aberdare was listed as having a full complement of officers in October 1944, in January 1945, she was only listed as having a temporary Warrant Engineer.) to 1947, Aberdare was used for harbour service at Malta. She was sold to the Belgian company Dohmen & Habets for mercantile use on 13 March 1947.
