= MV Loch Tarbert =

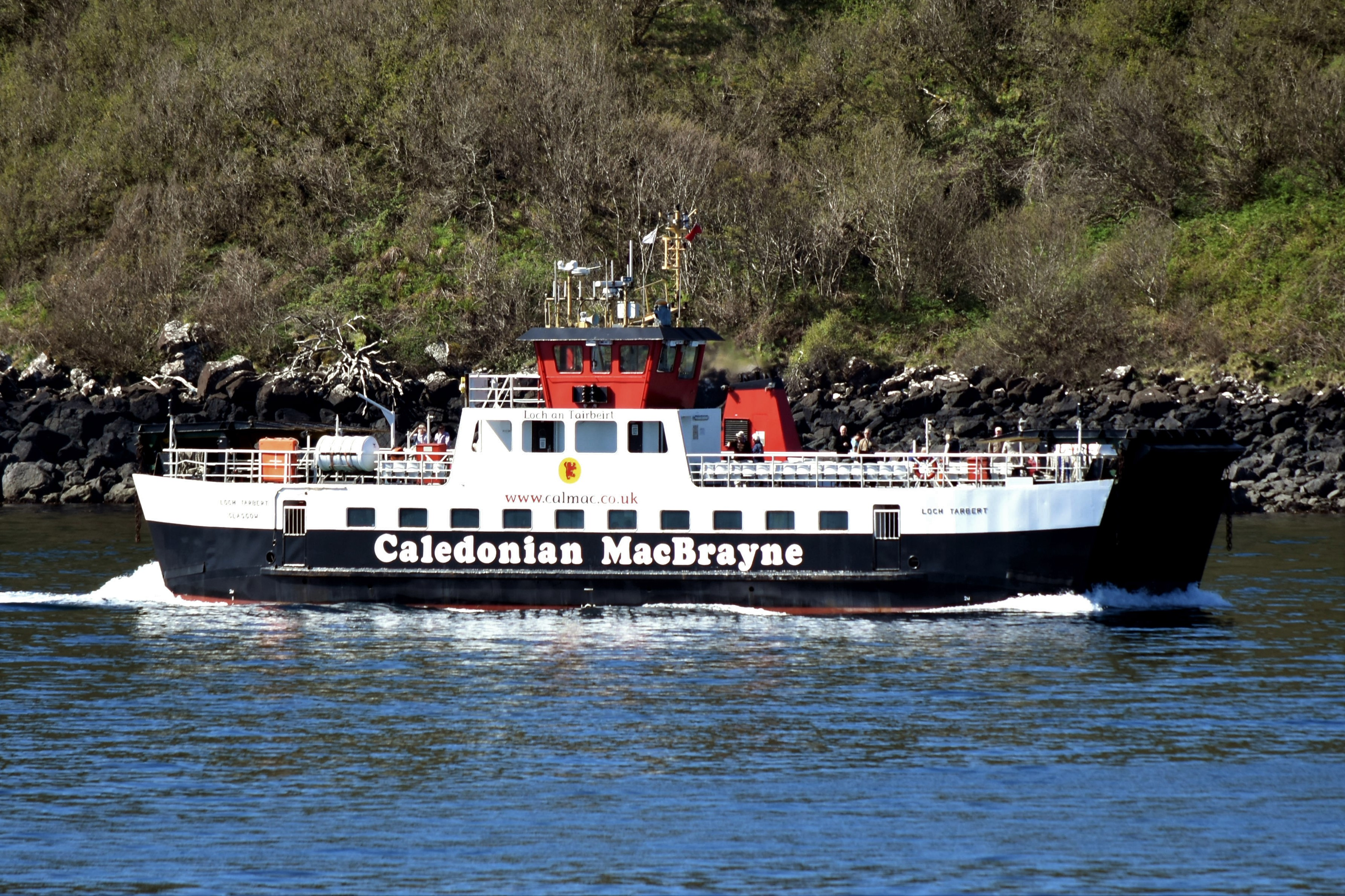
- Leaving Tobermory for Kilchoan, 8 May 2017.

History

United Kingdom
- Name: MV Loch Tarbert; Scottish Gaelic: Loch an Tairbeirt
- Namesake: West Loch Tarbert
- Owner: Caledonian Maritime Assets Limited
- Operator: Caledonian MacBrayne
- Port of registry: Glasgow
- Route: Tobermory - Kilchoan
- Builder: J W Miller & Sons Ltd, St Monans
- Yard number: 1046
- Launched: 20 February 1992
- In service: 25 July 1992
- Identification: IMO number: 9039389; Callsign: MPJT9; MMSI Number: 232003372
- Status: in service

General characteristics
- Class & type: ro-ro vehicle ferry
- Tonnage: 211 GT; 72 DWT
- Length: 30.2 m (99 ft 1 in)
- Beam: 10 m (32 ft 10 in)
- Draught: 1.6 m (5 ft 3 in)
- Propulsion: 2 × Voith Schneider Propellers
- Speed: 9 kn (17 km/h)
- Capacity: 142 passengers and 17 cars
- Crew: 3

MV Loch Tarbert (Scottish Gaelic: Loch an Tairbeirt) is a Caledonian Maritime Assets Limited ro-ro car ferry, built in 1992 and currently operated by Caledonian MacBrayne. She has spent most of her career on the seasonal Claonaig – Lochranza crossing.

== History ==
MV Loch Tarbert was built in 1992 by JW Miller & Sons Ltd of St Monans, following MV Loch Buie's launch there the previous year.

== Layout ==
Loch Tarbert is a variant on MV Isle of Cumbrae's design. Her car deck has capacity for 17 cars. Passenger accommodation for 150 passengers is in a starboard lounge and on two outer decks. A large funnel on the opposite side to her wheelhouse is painted in CalMac livery.

== Service ==
MV Loch Tarbert replaced MV Loch Ranza on the seasonal Claonaig – Lochranza crossing in July 1992, operating this crossing in summers until 2016. In winters, she has relieved at Iona, Fishnish, Colintraive and Largs. She provided additional dangerous loads sailings from Largs to Lochranza until the service from Tarbert to Arran started.

In early 1996, she opened the new Otternish – Leverburgh route across the Sound of Harris, awaiting new MV Loch Bhrusda. During a seaman's strike in 2000, Arran traffic was diverted to the Loch Fyne and Claonaig crossings. Loch Tarbert was joined by MV Isle of Cumbrae to cope with the traffic. At the end of recent summers, Loch Tarbert has moved to Tarbert to start a winter service to Portavadie, with a lunchtime sailing to Arran. The service is usually taken over by one of the smaller Loch Class. Loch Tarbert usually relieves at Largs, however spends most of the winter as a spare vessel.

Loch Tarbert was replaced on the Claonaig – Lochranza crossing in September 2016 by the MV Catriona – the third of Caledonian MacBrayne's hybrid ferries – and she became a spare/relief vessel that winter. In summer 2017, Loch Tarbert became the dedicated vessel on the Tobermory to Kilchoan route owing to rising vehicle traffic on that route. Loch Tarbert displaced MV Loch Linnhe in the process.

In January and February 2022, Loch Tarbert operated a temporary timetable of two to three return sailings per day from Tarbert to Lochranza, Arran. This was in response to a temporary COVID-19-related timetable on the Ardrossan - Brodick route operated by MV Hebridean Isles, to alleviate capacity issues from the absence of MV Caledonian Isles. This temporary timetable was extended when Caledonian Isles' return from annual overhaul was delayed.

In March 2024, Loch Tarbert experienced technical difficulties and was relieved by MV Loch Linnhe. On return to service, she was deployed to the Tarbert to Portavadie route, in place of Isle of Cumbrae which had been redeployed to Largs following damage to MV Loch Shira's ramps. This was due to the technical issues causing damage which meant she had to operate within the sheltered waters of the Clyde. In May, Loch Tarbert herself saw service at Largs alongside MV Loch Bhrusda after MV Isle of Cumbrae experienced technical difficulties. Service at Tarbert was taken up by MV Loch Riddon, with MV Loch Linnhe continuing to cover Loch Tarbert's normal roster at Tobermory. Spring 2025 saw Loch Tarbert return to the Tarbert to Portavadie service, with MV Isle of Cumbrae redeployed to Largs and MV Loch Riddon taking up service between Tobermory and Kilchoan.
