= Kelvin Diesels =

Kelvin Diesels is a manufacturer of marine diesel engines based in Glasgow, Scotland. The company's engines are used in a variety of vessels such as fishing boats and small tugs.

== History ==
The company was founded in 1904 by Walter Bergius as the "Bergius Car & Engine Company". Bergius rented a premises in Finnieston Street, Glasgow, and set about developing his first car which he named the "Kelvin". The car was not a commercial success. However, its engine proved to be an excellent marine engine following trials in a rowing gig in 1906. Car manufacture was abandoned, and the company began to specialize in marine engines. In 1907, the company installed one of its engines in a fishing boat, and in 1908 produced its first purpose-designed marine engine. The name of the company was changed to the "Bergius Launch and Engine Company".

The company expanded rapidly with the move to a new factory at Dobbies Loan, Glasgow in 1910. Output of engines increased to over 700 a year, and in 1915 the poppet valve range of engines was launched; these engines would remain in production, in an updated form, until 1968.

In 1921, Walter Bergius designed his sleeve valve range of engines. Though the engines performed well and were very quiet, a feature of sleeve valve engines, due to the lack of noisy valves and tappets, the engines were prone to excessive wear. The last sleeve-valve Kelvin engine was made in 1946.

Development of the Kelvin-Ricardo range of engines, designed to replace the sleeve-valve engine range, was undertaken between 1927 and 1930. Harry Ricardo, the famous engine designer, was employed as a consultant. The range was continuously developed and remained in production until 1971.

=== Kelvin-Diesel engines ===
The company's first diesel engine was introduced in 1931. This was a 2-cylinder engine which formed the basis of the model "K" range of engines, with 1-, 2-, 3-, 4-, and 6-cylinder versions. Later in 1933, a smaller diesel engine called the model "J" was launched, with 2-, 3-, and 4-cylinder variants. The "K" range remained in production until 1974, and the "J" range continued until 1970.

The model "P" range was introduced in 1956, having been designed by Mr. W. Miller, who joined the company from Petters Limited in 1954. The "P", along with the model "R" and the model "T" range (current production models), were the first engines not designed by Walter Bergius that were made by the company. Bergius died in 1949.

=== Later history ===
Following the death of the company's founder, Walter Bergius, in 1949, the family was forced to sell part of the company to settle death duties. In 1953, the company was acquired by the Associated British Oil Engine Company, a subsidiary of the Brush electrical engineering group. In 1961, the company name changed to Bergius-Kelvin Co. Ltd. and, in 1963, Gleniffer Engines was acquired by the company. Bergius-Kelvin was purchased by Ruston & Hornsby in 1966, who in turn were acquired by English Electric. The merger of English Electric with GEC, in 1968, led to yet another change of ownership. GEC consolidated all production of Kelvin Engines at Kyle Street in 1983. The company was sold to Lincoln Diesels in 1994, and relocated to Uddingston. In 1998, Torday and Carlisle Ltd. purchased the company.

=== The present time ===
In the year 2000, the company was purchased by British Polar Engines and engine production was moved to Helen Street in Glasgow. The company still produces a range of marine diesel engines.
