= MV Glenbrook =

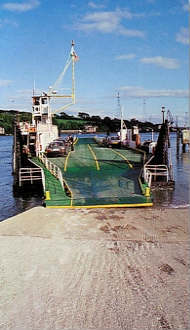
- MV Glenbrook at Glenbrook

History

United Kingdom
- Name: 1970: MV Lochalsh
- Namesake: Lochalsh
- Owner: Caledonian Steam Packet Company
- Port of registry: Glasgow
- Route: 1970 - 1991: Kyle of Lochalsh - Kyleakin
- Builder: Newport Shipbuilding & Engineering Co
- Cost: £110,000
- Launched: 11 February 1971
- In service: 31 March 1971
- Out of service: Sold 1991
- Identification: IMO number: 7101607

History

Ireland
- Name: 1993: MV Glenbrook
- Namesake: Glenbrook
- Owner: Doyle Shipping Group
- Operator: Cross River Ferries, Cork
- Route: Glenbrook to Carrigaloe
- In service: 1993
- Identification: IMO number: 7101607
- Status: in service

General characteristics
- Class & type: drive-through 28-car ferry
- Tonnage: 225 GT
- Length: 112 ft (34.1 m)
- Beam: 42 ft (12.8 m)
- Draught: 7.8 ft (2.4 m)
- Installed power: Gardner, Manchester
- Propulsion: 2 Voith-Schneider propellers
- Speed: 8 knots (15 km/h; 9.2 mph)
- Capacity: 200 passengers and 28 cars

MV Glenbrook is a double-ended, drive-through ferry, operating across the River Lee in County Cork. She was built in 1970 as MV Lochalsh for the Caledonian Steam Packet Company and served on the Skye crossing until 1991.

== History ==
MV Lochalsh was built to replace several smaller ferries on the Skye crossing. The crossing was an urgent problem when STG took over control from 1 January 1969. Side-loading had been slow and the vessels could not keep up with increasing demand. In August 1969, Patrick Thomas announced a number of innovations, including the ordering of two 28-car ferries for Skye. While they were being built at a Newport yard, Ross & Cromarty County Council and Inverness County Council proceeded with new terminals for end-loading operation. There were delays with the ships and with the slip at Kyle. Lochalsh was floated out of the building dock on 11 February 1971 and towed directly to Kyle for completion and trials. She entered service on 31 March alongside MV Kyleakin.

On 23 December 1988, Lochalsh was hit by a freak wave, leaving her seaward ramp trailing in the water and the vessel impossible to steer in the 60-knot westerly wind. With sixty passengers on board, she was blown eastwards and far into Loch Alsh. Two Naval tenders, from the BUTEC base pursued her and managed to get a line on board off Balmacara. She was assisted back to Kyle, finally tying up at the Railway pier at 10:10 pm.

The following day, the ferry sailed to Kyleakin to offload her vehicles. The damaged ramp was lifted and welded shut to allow her to give single-ramped assistance over the festive season. Service was provided by the relief vessel, MV Isle of Cumbrae until MV Kyleakin returned from overhaul. Lochalsh sailed to Stornoway for refit on 6 January 1989. Several modification were made following this incident. Although not required for a short crossing, lifejackets were provided. The ramps were prevented from falling below a fixed point.

== Layout ==
Lochalsh was very similar to Kyleakin which had been the first group ferry to be built outside Scotland, the first with drive-through capability and the first to be equipped with Voith-Schneider propulsion.

She was built with large hydraulic ramps at both ends of a vehicle deck, strengthened to carry vehicles up to 32 tons. A narrow lounge along one side, with a deck open above provided passengers accommodation. While Kyleakin had only one plain gantry mast on her wheelhouse, Lochalsh had an elaborate tetrapod mast at each end. These were removed during her service in Ireland.

Her Gardner diesel engines were coupled to two Voith-Schneider propulsion-units at diametrically opposed corners of her hull, making her extremely manoeuvrable.

== Service ==
Lochalsh and her sister MV Kyleakin replaced a fleet of small vessels at Skye in 1970/71. Traffic continued to increase.

New ferries were ordered in February 1990 from Ferguson Shipbuilders at Port Glasgow. From 28 April 1991, CalMac instituted a year-round 24-hour service. Lochalsh was displaced by arrival of the new MV Loch Dunvegan on 13 May 1991 but saw further service between 16 and 27 May while the new vessel settled in.

She was handed over to new owners on 17 June 1991 and left Kyleakin on the 19th. Her new owners, United Marine Transport (later acquired by Doyle Shipping Group), County Cork renamed her Glenbrook for service on the Carrigaloe–Glenbrook service, soon to be joined by her sister (renamed Carrigaloe). They operate across the River Lee, between Rushbrooke on Great Island and Passage West on the mainland in Cork Harbour.
