= Scalpay, Outer Hebrides =

Island in the Outer Hebrides of Scotland

Scalpay
Sgalpaigh (na Hearadh) (Gaelic)
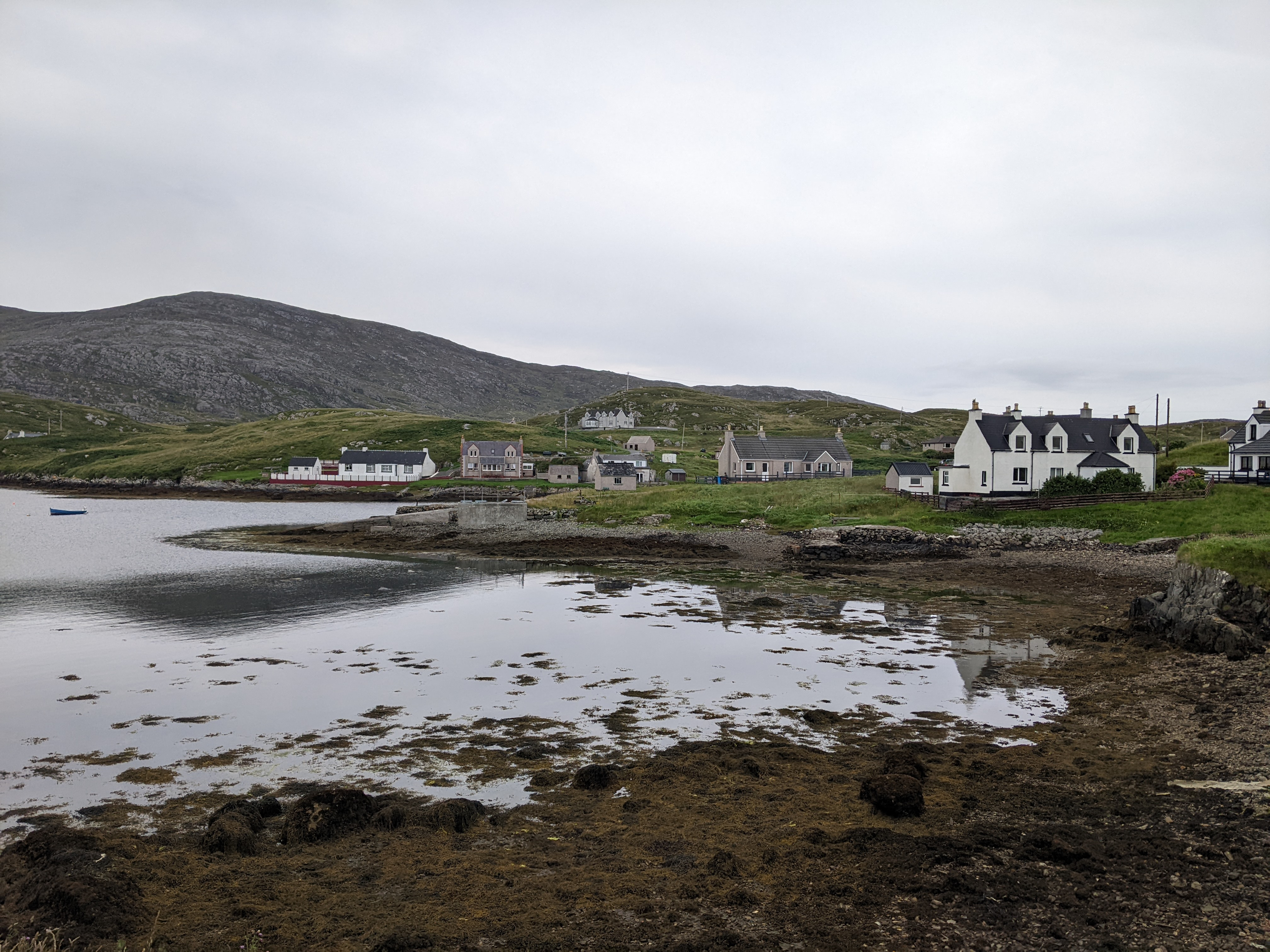
- Looking over the harbour of Scalpay towards its main settlement

Location
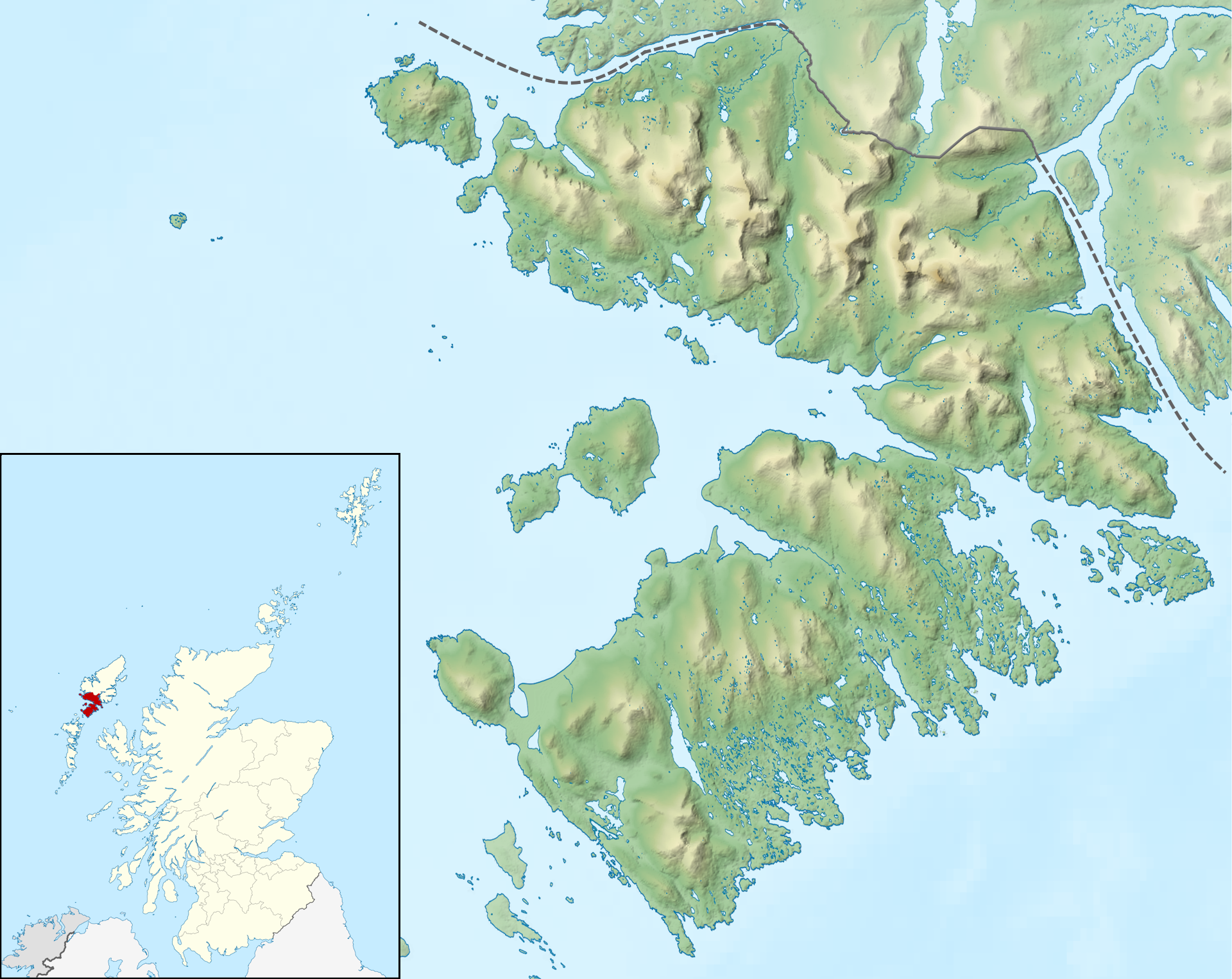
- Scalpay shown next to Harris Scalpay shown within the Outer Hebrides
- OS grid reference: NG214965
- Coordinates: 57°51′54″N 06°40′39″W

Name
- Gaelic pronunciation: [ˈs̪kal̪ˠpaj]
- Name meaning: scallop island or ship Island
- Old Norse name: Skalprøy

Physical geography
- Island group: Lewis and Harris
- Area: 653 ha (2 1/2 sq mi)
- Area rank: 66
- Highest elevation: Beinn Scorabhaig 104 m (341 ft)

Administration
- Council area: Comhairle nan Eilean Siar
- Country: Scotland
- Sovereign state: United Kingdom

Demographics
- Population: 282
- Population rank: 28
- Population density: 43/km^{2} (110/sq mi)
- Largest settlement: Am Baile (The Village)

Scalpay (/ˈskælpeɪ/; Scottish Gaelic: Sgalpaigh or Sgalpaigh na Hearadh; i.e. "Scalpay of Harris" to distinguish it from Scalpay off Skye) is an island in the Outer Hebrides of Scotland.

== Toponym ==
Mac an Tàilleir (2003) suggests the name derives from "ship island" from the Norse. However, Haswell-Smith states that the Old Norse name was Skalprøy, meaning "scallop island".

== Geology and geography ==
Scalpay is around 4 kilometres (2 1/2 miles) long and rises to a height of 104 metres (341 feet) at Beinn Scorabhaig. The area of Scalpay is 653 hectares (2 1/2 sq mi). The main settlement on the island is at the north, near the bridge, clustered around An Acairseid a Tuath (North Harbour).

The bedrock of northwest and of southeast Scalpay is Archaean gneiss belonging to the Lewisian Complex. Across the centre of the island is a band of mylonite and protocataclasite associated with the Outer Hebrides Thrust Zone. Some restricted occurrences of amphibolite and ultramafic rocks are also present. A number of tholeiitic dykes of Tertiary age cross the island with a NW-SE alignment. Scalpay is largely free from superficial deposits apart from an area of peat in the northeast.

The island is peppered with small lochans. The largest of these is Loch an Duin (Loch of the Fort) which has a tiny island in it, with the remains of the fort still visible. Eilean Glas, a tiny peninsula on Scalpay's eastern shore, is home to the first lighthouse to be built in the Outer Hebrides.

Scalpay's nearest neighbour, Harris, is just 300 metres (1,000 feet) away across the narrows of Caolas Scalpaigh. In 1997, a bridge from Harris to Scalpay was built, replacing a ferry service.

== History ==
In 1746, Charles Edward Stuart fled to Scalpay after his forces were defeated at the Battle of Culloden.

Scalpay is home to many Gaelic singers and psalm precentors. The island used to have more than 10 shops over 30 years ago but due to lack of people and work, the last shop closed in 2007. There also used to be a salmon factory, which was a major local employer from 2001 until its closure in 2005. In the spring of 2009, local newspapers reported that the factory was to reopen as a net washing facility to support the local fish farming industry. In 2012, the Scalpay community bought and opened a community shop/café, Buth Scalpaigh.

Photographer Marco Secchi lived on Scalpay for few years between 2002–2008 and documented life and landscape of the Outer Hebrides.

In 2011 the island's owner, Fred Taylor, announced that he proposed handing over the land to the local population. One proposal was that the island would be owned by a local development trust; under another proposal it would form part of the larger North Harris Trust, itself community owned. Islanders voted to accept the gift and assume community ownership of the island. They will go into partnership with the North Harris Community Trust to run the island.

== Demographics ==
In 2001, the island had 322 people, whose main employment was fish farming and prawn fishing. By 2011 the population had declined by 9% to 291 whilst during the same period Scottish island populations as a whole grew by 4% to 103,702. In 2022 the population was recorded as 282.

The island is home to two Presbyterian churches, the Free Church of Scotland and the Free Church of Scotland (Continuing).

== See also ==
- List of islands of Scotland
- Ailein Duinn
