= MV Kyleakin =

History

United Kingdom
- Name: 1970: MV Kyleakin; 1991: MV Carrigaloe
- Namesake: Kyleakin
- Owner: Caledonian Steam Packet Company
- Port of registry: Glasgow
- Route: 1970 - 1991: Kyle of Lochalsh - Kyleakin
- Builder: Newport Shipbuilding & Engineering Co
- Cost: £110.000
- Launched: 24 July 1970
- In service: 14 August 1970
- Identification: IMO number: 7028386
- Status: in service

General characteristics
- Class & type: drive-through 28-car ferry
- Tonnage: 225 GT
- Length: 112 ft (34.1 m)
- Beam: 42 ft (12.8 m)
- Draught: 7.8 ft (2.4 m)
- Installed power: Gardner, Manchester
- Propulsion: 2 Voith-Schneider propellers
- Speed: 8 knots (15 km/h; 9.2 mph)
- Capacity: 200 passengers and 28 cars

MV Kyleakin is double-ended, drive-through ferry, built in 1970 for the Skye crossing, where she served until 1991. She was renamed MV Carrigaloe for service across the River Lee in County Cork.

== History ==
MV Kyleakin was built to replace several smaller ferries on the Skye crossing. The crossing was an urgent problem when STG took over control from 1 January 1969. Side-loading had been slow and the small vessels could not keep up with increasing demand. In August 1969, Patrick Thomas announced a number of innovations, including the ordering of two 28-car ferries for Skye. While they were being built at a Newport yard, Ross & Cromarty County Council and Inverness County Council proceeded with new terminals for end-loading operation. There were delays with the ships and with the slip at Kyle. Kyleakin was floated out of the building dock on 24 July and towed to the Clyde for completion and trials. She finally entered service on 14 August but was troubled by problems with her hydraulic ramps and then her cooling system.

== Layout ==
Kyleakin was novel in several ways. She was the first group ferry to be built outside Scotland, the first with drive-through capability and the first to be equipped with Voith-Schneider propulsion.

She was built with large hydraulic ramps at both ends of a vehicle deck, strengthened to carry vehicles up to 32 tons. A narrow lounge along one side, with a deck open above provided passengers accommodation. Kyleakin had only one plain gantry mast, projecting inside from her wheelhouse.

Her Gardner diesel engines were coupled to two Voith-Schneider propulsion-units at diametrically opposed corners of her hull, making her extremely manoeuvrable.

== Service ==
Kyleakin and her sister MV Lochalsh replaced a fleet of small vessels at Skye in 1970/71. Traffic continued to increase. New ferries were ordered in February 1990 from Ferguson Shipbuilders at Port Glasgow. From 28 April 1991, CalMac instituted a year-round 24-hour service.

Kyleakin was displaced by the new MV Loch Fyne on 12 September 1991. Three days later, she left Kyle for Ireland. Her new owners, Cross River Ferries Ltd. of Cobh, County Cork renamed her Carrigaloe for service on the Carrigaloe–Glenbrook service, again in consort with her sister (renamed Glenbrook).
