= Caledonian MacBrayne fleet =

Car and passenger ferries in Scotland

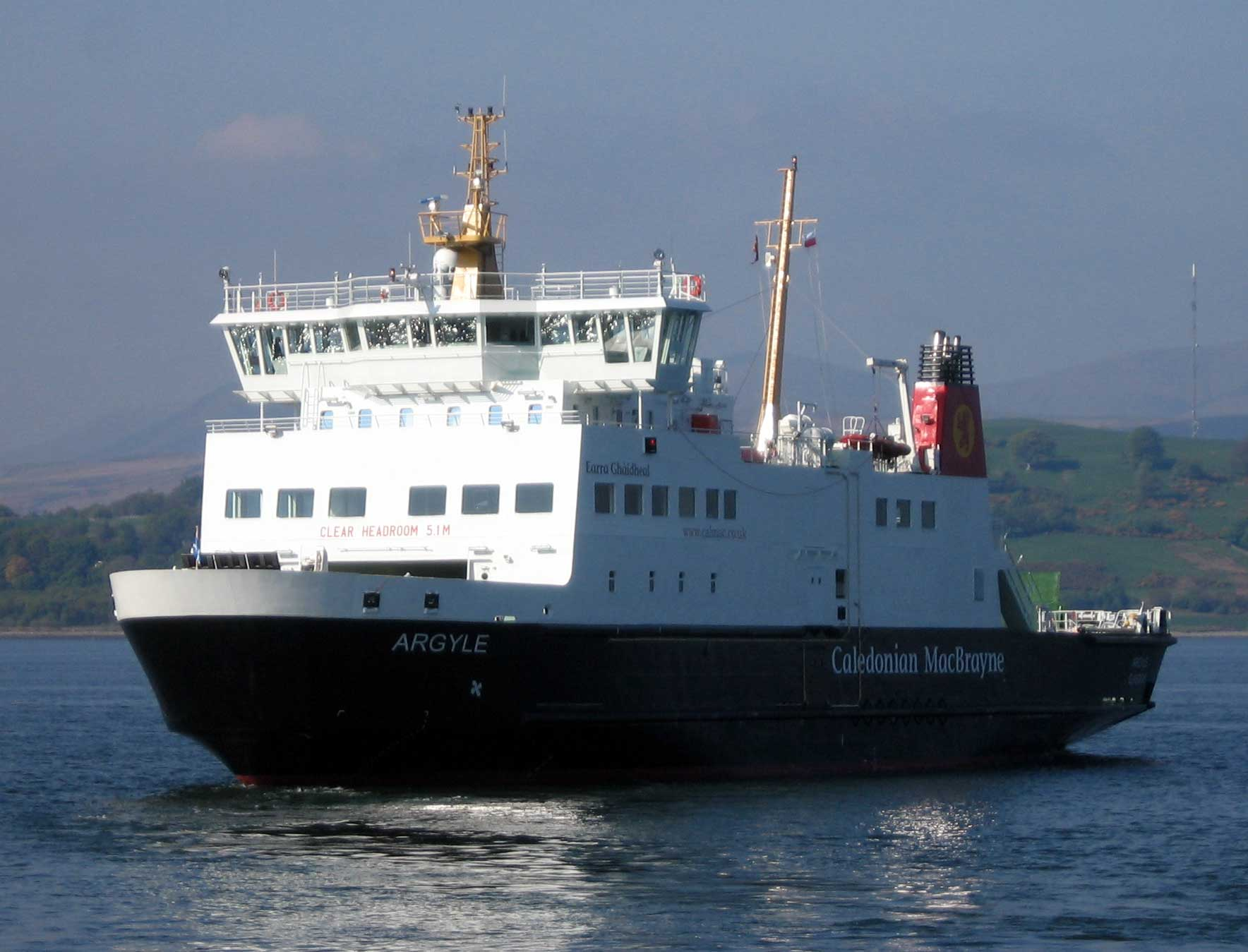
MV Argyle being prepared to enter service in 2007.

The Caledonian MacBrayne fleet is the largest fleet of car and passenger ferries in the United Kingdom, with 37 ferries in operation, and one vessel expected to enter service shortly. Further vessels are currently under construction or on order for the fleet. The company provides lifeline services to 23 islands off the west coast of Scotland, as well as operating routes in the Firth of Clyde.

Caledonian MacBrayne (CalMac) vessels can be readily identified by their black hulls and white superstructures. They have red funnels with black caps that display the Lion Rampant badge with masts in buff. The fleet can be categorised into various groups. 33 of the vessels are owned by the asset holding company Caledonian Maritime Assets Limited which is in turn, like CalMac, wholly owned by the Scottish Government. Two ferries, MV Ali Cat and MV Argyll Flyer, are directly owned by Caledonian MacBrayne, and a further two, MV Alfred and MV Chieftain, are on charter from other owners.

== Groups of vessels ==
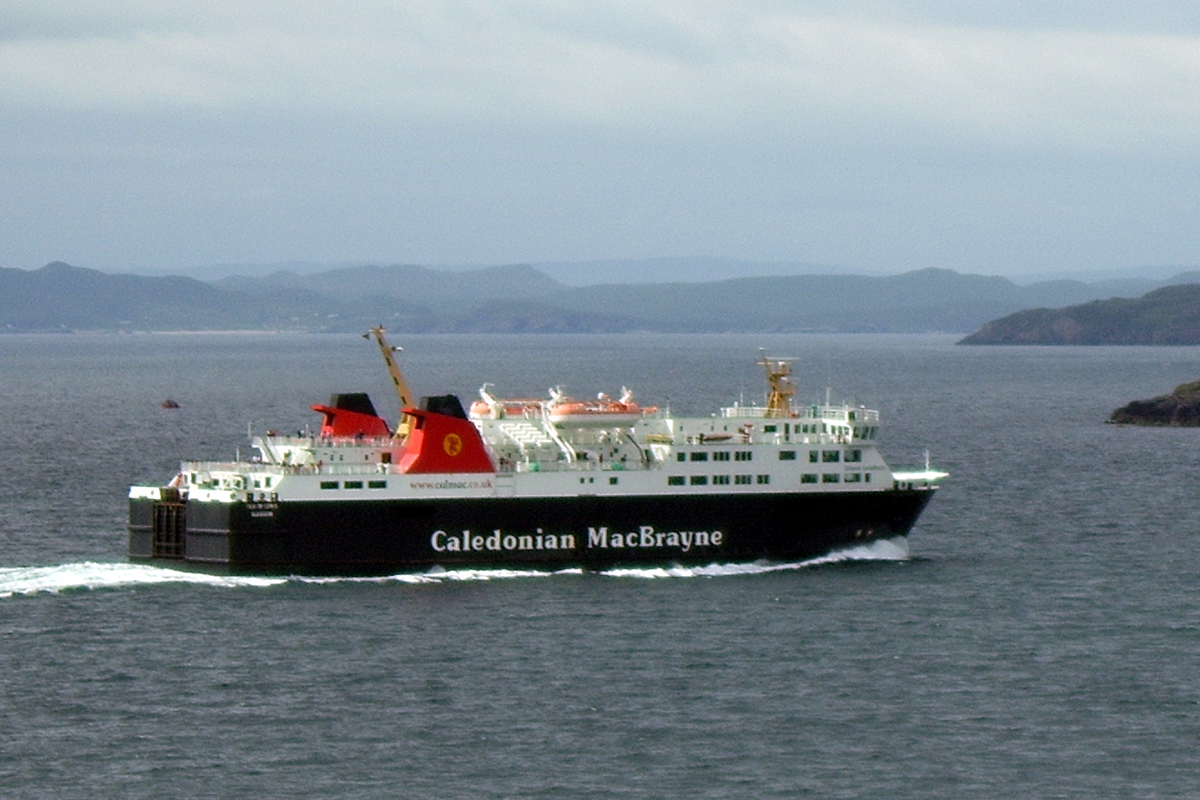
MV Isle of Lewis, the third-largest ship operated by Calmac, behind MV Glen Sannox and MV Loch Seaforth

=== Major vessels ===
There are presently twelve monohull vessels over 80 metres (260 feet) in length in the CalMac fleet: MV Isle of Arran, MV Isle of Mull, MV Lord of the Isles, MV Caledonian Isles, MV Isle of Lewis, MV Clansman, MV Hebrides, MV Finlaggan, MV Loch Seaforth MV Glen Sannox, MV Isle of Islay, and MV Loch Indaal.

These vessels usually operate on the longer crossings, with higher passenger numbers.

MV Loch Seaforth, at 116 m (381 ft) in length is the largest vessel in the fleet, and operates on the Ullapool to Stornoway, Lewis crossing. The newest vessel in current service is MV Isle of Islay, which entered service on 31 March 2026. She operates alongside MV Finlaggan to serve Islay and Colonsay from Kennacraig. MV Caledonian Isles has the highest passenger capacity and can carry 1000 people on the Ardrossan to Brodick, Arran crossing. MV Hebrides crosses The Minch from Uig, Skye, while MV Isle of Mull, and MV Clansman are based in Oban, serving Mull, Colonsay, Coll, Tiree and in the summer and for relief Barra. MV Isle of Lewis is based in Castlebay, serving Barra, sailing to Oban. MV Lord of the Isles is based in Lochboisdale, serving South Uist, sailing to Mallaig and Oban in the winter. MV Glen Sannox is first of two new dual-fuel ferries built by Ferguson Marine Engineering, being handed over to CalMac on 21 November 2024 and entering service on the Troon-Brodick route on 12 January 2025. MV Isle of Arran has been assisting with the Islay and Arran routes until further new vessels arrive, being effectively a spare vessel.

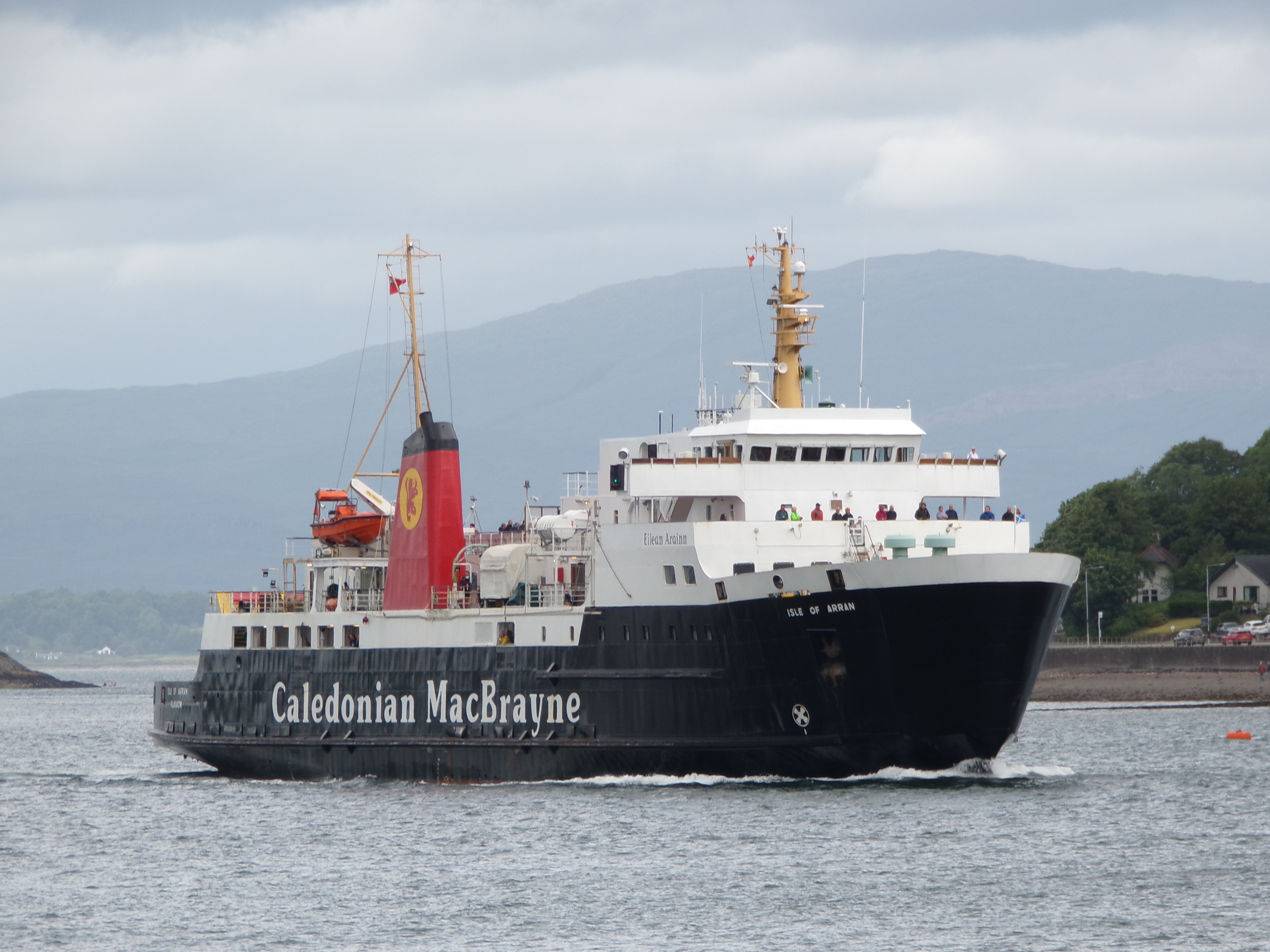
MV Isle of Arran arriving in Oban

Isle of Islay was the first of four identical vessels which were ordered in two batches from Cemre Marin Endustri in Turkey. Her sister ship, MV Loch Indaal, joined the fleet on 18 November 2026, but is yet to sail to Scotland. The remaining two ships, named MV Lochmor, and MV Claymore, are due to be delivered during 2027.

MV Glen Rosa (sister vessel to Glen Sannox), was launched on 12 March 2024 and is expected to delivered no earlier than October 2026. Completion of the two dual-fuel vessels has been delayed by over 6 years due to a variety of factors, sparking the "Scottish ferry fiasco", a series of political controversies that has arisen as a result of the severe delays.

=== Loch class ===
The Loch class are a group of smaller vessels with a single car deck, running the length of the ship, with a ramp at each end. They vary in length from 30.2 to 54.27 m (99 ft 1 in to 178 ft 1 in). Most are symmetrical when viewed from the side, with no operational bow or stern. Passenger accommodation is down one or both sides of the ship. This class is designed to be highly interchangeable depending on operational requirements and availability, however a few can only operate on a set route due to their design. Namely, MV Loch Portain, MV Loch Buie and MV Loch Shira, which were designed specifically for the route they operate on and also have a lounge above the car deck. They operate on shorter crossings, usually between 5 and 30 minutes, although MV Loch Alainn, MV Loch Portain, and MV Loch Striven take 40, 60 and 55 minutes on their respective routes, Sound of Barra between Ardmhor and Eriskay, Sound of Harris between Berneray and Leverburgh, and Oban and Lismore.

The original four Loch class vessels were based on MV Isle of Cumbrae. At 30.2 m (99 ft 1 in) in length, they can carry 12 cars and 200 passengers. The largest and newest, MV Loch Shira, is 54.27 by 13.90 m (178 ft 1 in by 45 ft 7 in) and can carry 32 cars and 250 passengers. She was built for and has run on the Largs to Cumbrae route since 2007. A mere 7 cm (3 in) shorter, MV Loch Fyne and MV Loch Dunvegan were built for the Skye crossing. They were made redundant by the opening of the Skye Bridge and eventually found redeployment elsewhere after some time laid up.

Of similar design, but larger than the Loch class, MV Hallaig was launched in 2012 for the Raasay service. She is powered by a hybrid combination of batteries and a small diesel engine - a world first for a sea-going RO-RO vessel. A second hybrid ferry, MV Lochinvar, was launched in May 2013 for the Tarbert to Portavadie route. The third hybrid ferry, MV Catriona, was launched on 11 December 2015 and entered service on the Claonaig to Lochranza route in September 2016.

In March 2025 a contract to build seven vessels to replace the Loch Class ferries was awarded to Remontowa Shipbuilding of Gdańsk in Poland, with the first vessel expected to be delivered by 2027. The ferries will be 49.9m long and have the capacity for 24/25 cars and 150 passengers or 15/16 cars and 250 passengers, depending on the design and route they will be on. Designs for further ferries for routes that require longer journeys or have port or sea constraints are currently being developed.

=== Passenger-only vessels ===
==== MV Argyll Flyer and MV Ali Cat ====
MV Argyll Flyer (244 passengers) and the catamaran MV Ali Cat (250 passengers) are passenger-only ferries used on the Gourock - Dunoon service. The ferries, formerly operated by Argyll Ferries, were acquired when that company was incorporated into Caledonian MacBrayne in January 2019. Ali Cat, then owned by Solent and Wightline Cruises and chartered by CalMac from Red Funnel Line, entered service on the route in 2002. MV Saturn last served Dunoon on 29 June 2011, and was then scheduled to operate the summer relief on the Arran crossing. From 30 June 2011, the Gourock - Dunoon service was awarded on a passenger-only basis to the newly formed David MacBrayne Ltd subsidiary Argyll Ferries. Argyll Ferries purchased Ali Cat and a former Irish boat renamed MV Argyll Flyer to serve the route. Argyll Flyer was not available for the start of the passenger-only service due to prop shaft problems. The company leased the cruise boat MV Clyde Clipper from Clyde Cruises to start the service, but she was out of service with engine problems for most of the first day.

==== MV Chieftain ====
MV Chieftain is a passenger-only vessel chartered from Clyde Marine Services to operate the Gourock to Kilcreggan service since 1 June 2020. She has the capacity for 80 passengers.

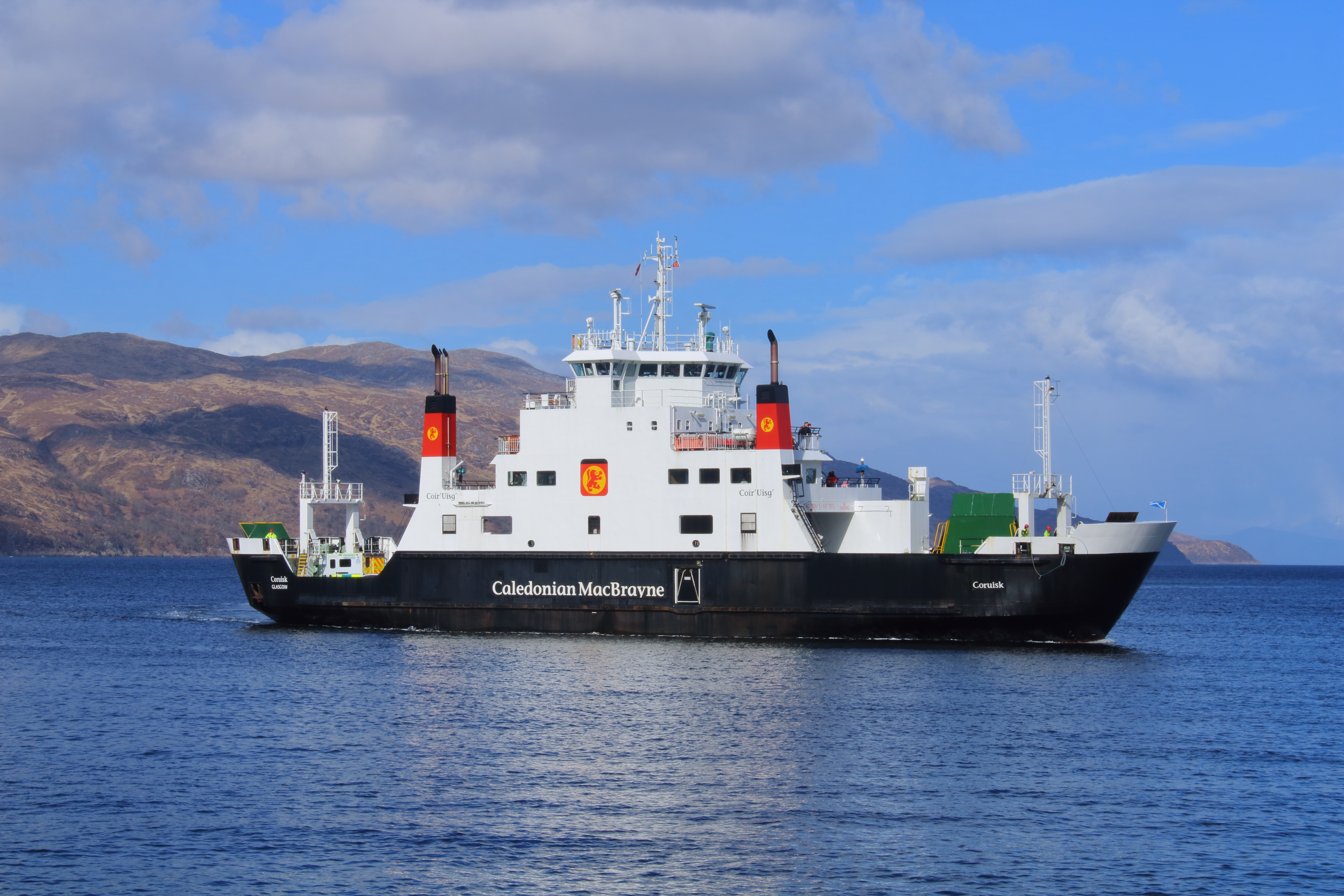
Coruisk at Craignure

=== Other vessels ===
There are seven vessels in the fleet which cannot be listed in the above categories.

==== MV Carvoria ====
MV Carvoria is a 12-metre-long (39-foot) vessel used on the Kerrera service. She was built in 2017 by Malakoff Limited in Shetland. She is a bow loading vessel of similar design to the old Island Class vessels and can take twelve passengers and one car, although due to vehicle restrictions on Kerrera she rarely carries cars. She is the smallest vessel in the fleet.

==== MV Coruisk ====
MV Coruisk is a 65 m (213 ft) "sheltered water vessel", operating on the Mallaig to Armadale route in summer, and relieving on the Clyde in winter. Her design allows her to make the crossing in reverse when sea conditions allow.

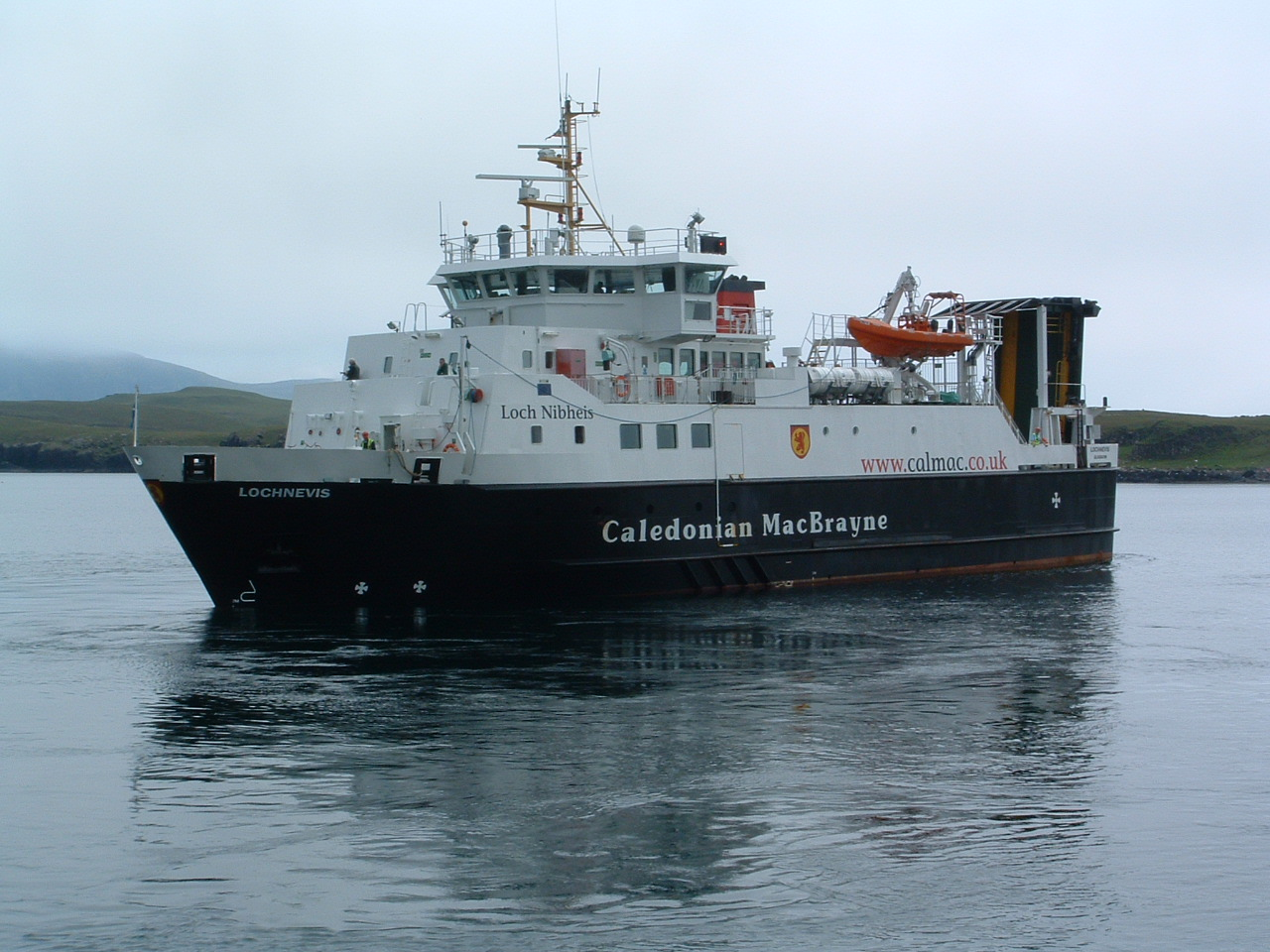
Lochnevis calls at Canna.

==== MV Lochnevis ====
MV Lochnevis is a highly specialised ship serving the Small Isles of Eigg, Canna, Rùm and Muck from Mallaig. She is 49.2 m (161 ft 5 in) long, and has capacity for 190 passengers. Her vehicle deck can accommodate up to 14 cars, but is empty on most sailings due to the lack of roads and vehicle restrictions on the Small Isles. She is instead used mostly for goods and vital equipment for the islands. Lochnevis has a surprisingly large vehicle ramp, which dominates her appearance. This allows her to berth a considerable distance from slipways, protecting her exposed Azipod propulsion systems in shallow waters.

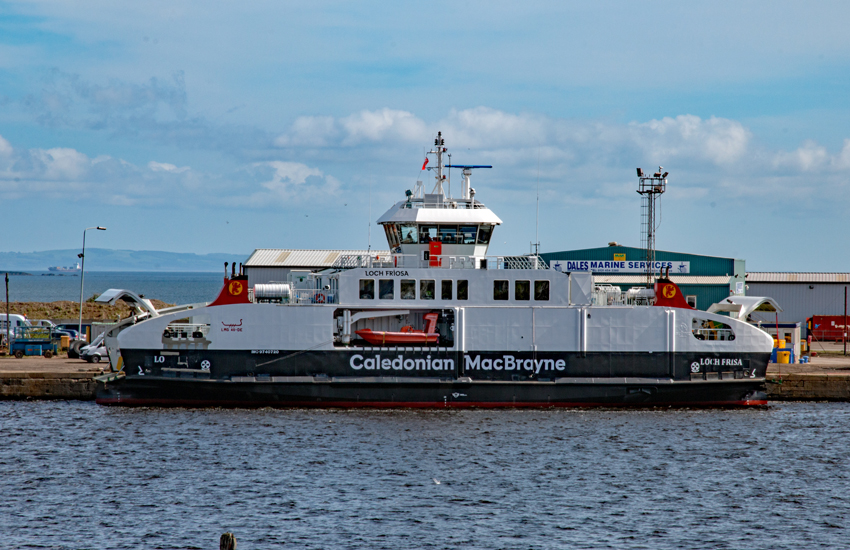
CalMac ferry Loch Frisa fitting out at Leith

==== MV Loch Frisa ====
MV Loch Frisa is a former Norled ferry bought by Caledonian MacBrayne in 2021. She was built in 2015 as Utne and operated for Norled for 6 years. She is a double-ender ferry with passenger capacity for 195, and capacity for 40 cars, or 4 HGVs. She measures 50 m (164 ft 1 in) long by 14.5 m (47 ft 7 in) metres wide. Following a naming competition, CMAL announced the vessel would be renamed MV Loch Frisa.

==== MV Alfred ====
MV Alfred is a 84.5 m (277 ft) catamaran ferry chartered from Pentland Ferries. She can carry 98 cars and 430 passengers. She operated as the second summer vessel on the Ardrossan - Brodick route from May to September 2023. Berthing trials at Stornoway in October 2023 were unsuccessful and she underwent bow thruster repairs before returning to Arran, allowing MV Caledonian Isles to carry out berthing trials at Islay, Colonsay, Mull, Coll & Tiree. Her charter was extended by 6 months on 6 November 2023 to last until 21 August 2024. During November and December, due to a technical issue with MV Loch Portain, Alfred provided a service between Tarbert and Lochmaddy. She then partnered MV Isle of Arran on the Arran service during the overhaul of MV Caledonian Isles. In July 2024, it was announced that the charter had been extended for a further six months until March 2025. Her charter was extended, on 26 February 2025, to the end of May 2025 due to the ongoing delays with MV Caledonian Isles. Pentland Ferries announced on 3 June 2025 that Alfred's charter had been extended for further fleet resilience.

MV Bute Passing Toward Lighthouse

==== MV Argyle and MV Bute ====
The Wemyss Bay to Rothesay route is operated by two vessels, built in Poland, MV Bute (delivered in spring 2005) and MV Argyle, which entered service in 2007. There was much controversy following the decision to award the shipbuilding contracts to yards outside Scotland. Their introduction into service was delayed by pier work to install an end-loading linkspan, allowing full ro-ro operation.

== Current fleet ==
Name	Cars (original)*	Cars (current)*	Passengers	Type	Routes	Launched	Shipbuilder	Image
MV Isle of Cumbrae	18	13	160	Double-ended car ferry	Tarbert (Loch Fyne) - Portavadie(Summer); Relief vessel (Winter)	1976	Ailsa Shipbuilding Company, Troon	
MV Isle of Arran	76	57	448	Car ferry	Relief vessel	1983	Ferguson Ailsa Ltd, Port Glasgow	
MV Loch Striven	12	10	203	Double-ended car ferry	Oban - Achnacroish, Lismore	1986	Richard Dunston, Hessle	
MV Loch Linnhe	12	10	203	Double-ended car ferry	Relief vessel	1986	Richard Dunston, Hessle	
MV Loch Riddon	12	10	203	Double-ended car ferry	Tobermory - Kilchoan	1986	Richard Dunston, Hessle	
MV Loch Ranza	12	10	203	Double-ended car ferry	Tayinloan - Ardminish, Gigha	1986	Richard Dunston, Hessle	
MV Isle of Mull	80	63	962	Car ferry	Oban - Craignure; Oban - Castlebay / Lochboisdale (Winter, early summer relief)	1987	Ferguson Shipbuilders, Port Glasgow	
MV Lord of the Isles	56	50	505	Car ferry	Mallaig - Lochboisdale; Oban - Lochboisdale (Winter only); Oban - Castlebay (Winter relief)	1989	Ferguson Shipbuilders, Port Glasgow	
MV Loch Dunvegan III	36	35	200	Double-ended car ferry	Colintraive - Rhubodach	1991	Ferguson Shipbuilders, Port Glasgow	
MV Loch Fyne II	36	35	200	Double-ended car ferry	Lochaline - Fishnish; Relief vessel	1991	Ferguson Shipbuilders, Port Glasgow	
MV Loch Buie III	10	9	250	Double-ended car ferry	Fionnphort - Baile Mòr, Iona	1991	J W Miller & Sons Ltd, St Monans	
MV Loch Tarbert	18	16	142	Double-ended car ferry	Largs - Cumbrae Slip (Tattie Pier) (summer); Relief (Winter)	1992	J W Miller & Sons Ltd, St Monans	
MV Caledonian Isles	110	88	1000	Car ferry	Ardrossan/Troon - Brodick	1993	Richards (Shipbuilders) Ltd, Suffolk	
MV Isle of Lewis	123	98	680	Car ferry	Oban - Castlebay; Ullapool - Stornoway (Winter relief)	1995	Ferguson Shipbuilders, Port Glasgow	
MV Loch Bhrusda	18	13	150	Double-ended car ferry	Mallaig - Armadale (Summer); Mallaig - Rùm - Canna - Eigg - Muck (Summer & relief); Relief vessel (Winter)	1996	McTay Marine, Merseyside	
MV Loch Alainn	24	20	150	Double-ended car ferry	Ardmhòr - Eriskay	1997	Buckie Shipbuilders Ltd	
MV Clansman V	100	78	638	Car ferry	Oban - Arinagour - Scarinish ( - Castlebay (Summer only)); Oban - Scalasaig; Oban - Craignure (Winter only)	1998	Appledore Shipbuilders, Devon	
MV Ali Cat	0	0	250	Passenger catamaran ferry	Gourock - Dunoon	1999; joined CalMac fleet 2019 (Note: Had previously operated for Calmac 2002-2011)	South Boats of East Cowes	
MV Lochnevis II	14	10	190	Car ferry	Mallaig - Rùm - Canna - Eigg - Muck; Mallaig - Armadale (Winter)	2000	Ailsa Shipbuilding Company, Troon	
MV Hebrides III	100	86	612	Car ferry	Uig - Lochmaddy / Tarbert; Oban - Arinagour - Scarinish (Winter relief); Oban - Scalasaig (Winter relief)	2000	Ferguson Shipbuilders, Port Glasgow	
MV Argyll Flyer	0	0	244	Passenger ferry	Gourock - Dunoon	2001; joined CalMac fleet 2019	OCEA, France	
MV Loch Portain	32	32	146	Double-ended car ferry	Leverburgh - Berneray	2003	Feniks, Gdańsk and McTay Marine	
MV Coruisk III	40	35	250	Car ferry	Mallaig - Armadale (Summer); Oban - Craignure (Summer relief); Wemyss Bay - Rothesay (Winter relief)	2003	Appledore Shipbuilders, Devon	
MV Bute VII	60	56	450	Car ferry	Wemyss Bay - Rothesay	2005	Remontowa Group, Poland	
MV Argyle VII	60	56	450	Car ferry	Wemyss Bay - Rothesay	2006	Remontowa Group, Poland	
MV Loch Shira	36	28	250	Double-ended car ferry	Largs - Cumbrae Slip (Tattie Pier)	2006	Ferguson Shipbuilders, Port Glasgow	
MV Chieftain II (on charter)	0	0	80	Passenger ferry	Gourock - Kilcreggan	2007; joined CalMac fleet 2020	Voyager Boatyard	
MV Finlaggan	85	77	550	Car ferry	Kennacraig – Port Askaig; Kennacraig – Port Askaig - Oban - Colonsay	2010	Remontowa Group, Poland	
MV Hallaig	23	22	150	Double-ended diesel electric hybrid car ferry	Sconser - Raasay	2012	Ferguson Shipbuilders, Port Glasgow	
MV Lochinvar II	23	22	150	Double-ended diesel electric hybrid car ferry	Lochaline - Fishnish; Relief vessel	2013	Ferguson Shipbuilders, Port Glasgow	
MV Loch Seaforth II	143	130	700	Car ferry	Ullapool - Stornoway	2014	Flensburger Schiffbau-Gesellschaft, Germany	
MV Catriona	23	22	150	Double-ended diesel electric hybrid car ferry	Claonaig – Lochranza (Summer); Tarbert (Loch Fyne) - Portavadie (Winter); Tarbert (Loch Fyne) – Lochranza (Winter)	2015	Ferguson Marine, Port Glasgow	
MV Loch Frisa II	40	31	195	Double-ended car ferry	Oban - Craignure	2015; joined CalMac fleet 2022	Sefine Shipyard, Turkey	
MV Carvoria	1	1	12	Bow-loading landing craft	Gallanach - Kerrera	2017	Malakoff Limited, Lerwick, Shetland	
MV Alfred (on charter)	98	92	430	Catamaran car ferry	Troon - Brodick	2019; joined CalMac fleet 2023	Strategic Marine, Vietnam	
MV Glen Sannox IV	127	121	852	LNG/MGO dual-fuel car ferry	Oban - Castlebay (summer from 2027); Relief vessel	2017; entered service 2025	Ferguson Marine, Port Glasgow	
MV Isle of Islay	107	107	450	Diesel-Electric car ferry	Kennacraig – Port Askaig; Kennacraig – Port Askaig - Colonsay - Oban	2024; entered service 2026	Cemre Shipyard, Yalova, Turkey	
MV Loch Indaal	107	107	450	Diesel electric car ferry	Awaiting entry into service	June 2024; delivered November 2026.	Cemre Marin Endustri, Turkey	MV Loch Indaal image on CMAL website

Notes:

- Car (original): car capacity at time of build.
- Car (current): car capacity as of 2025 based on current car sizes.

== Future fleet ==
There are currently three "major vessels" under construction for the Caledonian MacBrayne fleet, under two separate contracts with yards in Scotland and Turkey. Smaller ferries are also under construction in Poland as part of a single contract for 7 such vessels.

=== Major vessels ===
The second of the two dual-fuel ferries under construction by Ferguson Marine Engineering, MV Glen Rosa, is expected to be delivered in September 2026 at the earliest.

Following the completion of Isle of Islay and Loch Indaal, two further vessel of the same design remain under construction at Cemre Shipyard in Turkey. Although the original £91 million contract with Cemre was for only these two vessels, in October 2022 it was announced that two further vessels would be built to a very similar specification for services to Tarbert and Lochmaddy from Uig and to provide additional resilience in the fleet. These two vessels are to be named MV Claymore and MV Lochmor. Lochmor was originally expected to be delivered in the third quarter of 2025, with Claymore following by the end of the year. However, in February 2025 the shipyard announced delays, blaming the impact of the war in Ukraine on steel supplies, Houthi attacks on vessels in the Red Sea, the 2023 Turkey–Syria earthquakes, a shortage of commissioning engineers, and snow and cold weather in Turkey. As of September 2026, it was expected that Claymore would be delivered in the second quarter of 2027, with Lochmor following some time in the first half of 2027. Total costs for all four vessels have risen by approximately £20M.

As the new major ferries come into service a number of ferries will be withdrawn, however one is expected to be retained as a "resilience vessel" to cover for breakdowns elsewhere in the fleet. On 25 September 2026, CalMac published a report, indicating that MV Isle of Lewis would leave the fleet once MV Glen Rosa had entered service, whilst MV Caledonian Isles would leave the fleet once MV Claymore was also in service. MV Isle of Arran is planned to leave the fleet in August 2027, serving as a relief vessel until then. All three vessels are expected to be placed on the open market for sale once no longer in use by CalMac.

=== Small vessel replacement project ===
The small vessel replacement project (SVRP) will see the replacement of the oldest of the Loch class vessels, in two phases over ten years. For Phase 1 of this project, in March 2025 a contract to build seven vessels was awarded to Remontowa Shipbuilding of Gdańsk in Poland, the same shipyard that built MVs Argyle, Bute and Finlaggan. These are electric ferries, though may require to be run on diesel until shore power can be fully set up, with the first vessel expected in 2027. The first steel was cut for the first of these vessels, MV Loch Awe, in September 2025. In December 2025 Loch Awe's keel was laid, and steel was cut for the second vessel, MV Loch Etive. As of November 2026, construction was underway for five of the seven vessels, with the first three being scheduled to launch in the first quarter of 2027.

Phase 2 of the SVRP will see the construction of vessels designed for the more exposed routes in the Outer Hebrides. Initial design and port feasibility studies for these vessels commenced in August 2024. On 3 March 2026 the Deputy First Minister Kate Forbes announced that the government intended that 2 vessels would be ordered from Ferguson Marine via a direct award, without going out to tender, however in November CMAL's chief executive Kevin Hobb told MSPs that the CMAL board of directors were opposed to making a direct order, and would only place the order with Ferguson's if instructed to do so by the government.

=== Summary of vessels on order ===
Name	Cars	Passengers	Type	Routes	Build Details	Shipbuilder	Image
MV Glen Rosa II	127	852	LNG/MGO dual-fuel car ferry	Troon - Brodick	Under construction, delivery expected February 2027. Launched 9 April 2024.	Ferguson Marine, Port Glasgow	
MV Lochmor III	107	450	Diesel electric car ferry	Uig - Tarbert	Delivery expected Q2 2027.	Cemre Marin Endustri, Turkey	MV Lochmor Image on CMAL website
MV Claymore IV	107	450	Diesel electric car ferry	Uig - Lochmaddy	Delivery expected Q3 2027.	Cemre Marin Endustri, Turkey	MV Claymore image on CMAL website
MV Loch Awe; MV Loch Etive; MV Loch Katrine; MV Loch Maree; MV Loch Morar; MV Loch Rannoch; MV Loch Shiel	24	150	SVRP Phase 1: 7 double-ended electric car ferries	Lochaline - Fishnish	Yard Numbers B621/1 to B621/7. Delivery of first vessel expected summer 2027, with final vessel scheduled for end of Q1 2029.	Remontowa Group, Poland	
MV Loch Awe; MV Loch Etive; MV Loch Katrine; MV Loch Maree; MV Loch Morar; MV Loch Rannoch; MV Loch Shiel	24	150	SVRP Phase 1: 7 double-ended electric car ferries	Colintraive - Rhubodach	Yard Numbers B621/1 to B621/7. Delivery of first vessel expected summer 2027, with final vessel scheduled for end of Q1 2029.	Remontowa Group, Poland	
MV Loch Awe; MV Loch Etive; MV Loch Katrine; MV Loch Maree; MV Loch Morar; MV Loch Rannoch; MV Loch Shiel	24	150	SVRP Phase 1: 7 double-ended electric car ferries	Sconser - Raasay	Yard Numbers B621/1 to B621/7. Delivery of first vessel expected summer 2027, with final vessel scheduled for end of Q1 2029.	Remontowa Group, Poland	
MV Loch Awe; MV Loch Etive; MV Loch Katrine; MV Loch Maree; MV Loch Morar; MV Loch Rannoch; MV Loch Shiel	24	150	SVRP Phase 1: 7 double-ended electric car ferries	Tarbert (Loch Fyne) - Portavadie	Yard Numbers B621/1 to B621/7. Delivery of first vessel expected summer 2027, with final vessel scheduled for end of Q1 2029.	Remontowa Group, Poland	
MV Loch Awe; MV Loch Etive; MV Loch Katrine; MV Loch Maree; MV Loch Morar; MV Loch Rannoch; MV Loch Shiel	24	150	SVRP Phase 1: 7 double-ended electric car ferries	Tayinloan - Ardminish, Gigha	Yard Numbers B621/1 to B621/7. Delivery of first vessel expected summer 2027, with final vessel scheduled for end of Q1 2029.	Remontowa Group, Poland	
MV Loch Awe; MV Loch Etive; MV Loch Katrine; MV Loch Maree; MV Loch Morar; MV Loch Rannoch; MV Loch Shiel	16	250	SVRP Phase 1: 7 double-ended electric car ferries	Fionnphort - Baile Mòr, Iona	Yard Numbers B621/1 to B621/7. Delivery of first vessel expected summer 2027, with final vessel scheduled for end of Q1 2029.	Remontowa Group, Poland	
MV Loch Awe; MV Loch Etive; MV Loch Katrine; MV Loch Maree; MV Loch Morar; MV Loch Rannoch; MV Loch Shiel	16	250	SVRP Phase 1: 7 double-ended electric car ferries	Tobermory - Kilchoan	Yard Numbers B621/1 to B621/7. Delivery of first vessel expected summer 2027, with final vessel scheduled for end of Q1 2029.	Remontowa Group, Poland	

== Former fleet ==
For vessels in the fleet before the merger in 1973, see Caledonian Steam Packet Company and David MacBrayne.

Name	Built	Entered service	Left service	Additional information	Image
MV Hebridean Isles	1985	1985	Nov 2024	The first MacBrayne vessel to be ordered and built for them outside Scotland and the first to be launched sideways. With bow, stern and side ramps, Hebridean Isles was suitable for all the routes served by the large fleet units. After 15 years crossing the Little Minch on the Uig triangle, she served Islay and Colonsay before being retired in November 2024, after almost 40 years of service. She was to Esbjerg in Denmark for scrapping in October 2025. Spare parts which could be used for maintaining other vessels were removed for storage prior to her departure to Denmark.	
FB Laig Bay	2000	2000	2004	Eigg Tender	
MV Gylen Lady	1999	1 July 2017	5 Sept 2017	Continues to do relief duties to cover for the overhaul of MV Cavoria on the Kerrera route.	
MV Arrow	1998	July 2021; Jan 2023; Nov 2023	Sep 2021; Mar 2023; Nov 2023	Charter vessel from Seatruck Ferries and Isle of Man Steam Packet Co. for Stornoway freight service.	
MV Clipper Ranger	1998	2013	2015	Charter vessel from Seatruck Ferries for Stornoway freight service.	
MV Muirneag	1979	Sept 2002	Sept 2013	Charter vessel from Harrison's (Clyde) Ltd for Stornoway freight service.	
MV Hascosay	1971	May 2002	Aug 2002	Charter vessel from NorthLink Ferries for Stornoway freight service.	
MV Lochmor II	1979	1979	2001		
MV Claymore III	1978	1978; Oct 1997	May 1997; Apr 1998	Sold to Sea Container Service Ltd then to Pentland Ferries. She was chartered back 1997/8.	
MV Saturn	1977	1977	2011	Alongside MV Jupiter and MV Juno, Saturn provided the Dunoon and Rothesay services for the best part of 35 years. The three vessels were nicknamed the "streakers", because of their speed and ability to manoeuvre rapidly both at sea and in port. She was sold in 2011 to Pentland Ferries for service to Orkney, being renamed MV Orcadia.	
MV Raasay	1976	1976	2018		
MV Canna	1975	1975	2017		
MV Eigg II	1974	1974	2018		
MV Juno III	1974	1974	2010	Alongside MV Juno and MV Saturn Juno provided the Dunoon and Rothesay services for the best part of 35 years. The three vessels were nicknamed the "streakers", because of their speed and ability to manoeuvre rapidly both at sea and in port. Juno was withdrawn from service in 2010, and by June 2011 had been broken up at Rosneath.	
MV Pioneer III	1974	1974	2004		
MV Suilven	1974	1974	1995		
MV Jupiter II	1973	1974	2011	Alongside MV Juno and MV Saturn, Jupiter provided the Dunoon and Rothesay services for the best part of 35 years. The three vessels were nicknamed the "streakers", because of their speed and ability to manoeuvre rapidly both at sea and in port. Jupiter was withdrawn from service in 2010, and in June 2011 was sold to breakers in Denmark for recycling.	
MV Bruernish	1973	1973	2006		
MV Coll II	1973	1973	1998		
MV Rhum	1973	1973	1998		
MV Morvern	1972	1972, 1973	1995	From David MacBrayne	
MV Kilbrannan	1972	1972, 1973	1992	From Caledonian Steam Packet	
MV Lochalsh III	1971	1971, 1973	1991	From Caledonian Steam Packet	
MV Iona VII	1970	1970, 1973; Apr 1998; Nov 2008	1997; May 1998; Dec 2008	From David MacBrayne. Sold to Pentland Ferries renamed MV Pentalina-B. Chartered back to CalMac twice.	
MV Kyleakin III	1970	1970, 1973	1991	From Caledonian Steam Packet	
MV Coruisk II	1969	1969, 1973	1986	From Caledonian Steam Packet	
MV Broadford II	1967	1967, 1973	1987	From Caledonian Steam Packet	
MV Caledonia III	1966	1970, 1973	1988	From Caledonian Steam Packet, former MV Stena Baltica	
MV Portree II	1965	1965, 1973	1987	From Caledonian Steam Packet	
MV Columba II	1964	1964, 1973	1989	From David MacBrayne, current MV Hebridean Princess	
MV Clansman IV	1964	1964, 1973	1984	From David MacBrayne	
MV Hebrides II	1963	1963, 1973	1985	From David MacBrayne	
FB Iona VI	1962	1962, 1973	1988	From David MacBrayne, Iona - Staffa Tender	
MV Keppel	1961	1967, 1973	1993	From Caledonian Steam Packet	
MV Kyleakin II	1960	1960, 1973	1983	From Caledonian Steam Packet	
MV Glen Sannox III	1957	1957, 1973	1989	From Caledonian Steam Packet	
MV Lochalsh II	1957	1957, 1973	1979	From Caledonian Steam Packet	
FB Ulva	1956	1956, 1973	2001	From David MacBrayne, Iona - Staffa then Eigg tender	
MV Claymore II	1955	1955, 1973	1976	From David MacBrayne	
MV Bute VI	1954	1954, 1973	1979	From Caledonian Steam Packet	
MV Cowal II	1954	1954, 1973	1979	From Caledonian Steam Packet	
PS Maid of the Loch	1953	1953, 1973	1981	From Caledonian Steam Packet, restoration being done by preservation society	
MV Arran II	1953	1954, 1973	1980	From Caledonian Steam Packet	
MV Maid of Cumbrae	1953	1953, 1973	1978	From Caledonian Steam Packet, converted to a car ferry	
MV Maid of Argyll	1953	1953, 1973	1974	From Caledonian Steam Packet	
MV Maid of Ashton	1953	1953, 1973	1973	From Caledonian Steam Packet	
MV Maid of Skelmorlie	1953	1953, 1973	1973	From Caledonian Steam Packet	
MV Loch Carron	1951	1951, 1973	1976	From David MacBrayne	
PS Waverley	1947	1947, 1973	1974	From Caledonian Steam Packet, currently run by a preservation society	
MV Loch Seaforth I	1947	1947, 1973	1973	From David MacBrayne	
MV Loch Dunvegan II	1946	1950, 1973	1973	From David MacBrayne	
MV Loch Toscaig	1945	1955, 1973	1975	From David MacBrayne	
FB Applecross	1944	1963; 1973	1969; 1985	Kylerhea, Tobermory and Iona Tender	
MV Loch Arkaig	1942	1960, 1973	1979	From David MacBrayne	
MV Loch Nell	1941	1947, 1973	1981	From David MacBrayne	
FB Staffa VI	1934	1975	1981	Tender	
TS Queen Mary	1933	1935, 1973	1978	From Caledonian Steam Packet, restoration being done by preservation society	
FB Kildonan II	1923	1975	1985	Tender	
FB Eigg I	1923	1966, 1973	1978	From David MacBrayne, Tender	
FB Craignure	1904	1950; 1973	1964; 1979	Craignure and Iona Tender	
FB Tiger	1904	1973	1975	Iona Tender	
