= HMS Juno =

Seven ships of the Royal Navy have been named HMS Juno after the Roman goddess Juno:

- HMS Juno (1757) was a 32-gun fifth rate launched in 1757. She was burnt at Rhode Island in 1778 to prevent her capture.
- HMS Juno (1780) was a 32-gun Amazon-class fifth rate launched in 1780 and broken up in 1811.
- HMS Juno (1844) was a 26-gun sixth rate launched in 1844. She was renamed HMS Mariner in 1878, and became a training ship named HMS Atalanta later that year. She foundered in the Atlantic in 1880.
- HMS Juno (1867) was a wooden screw corvette launched in 1867 and sold in 1887.
- HMS Juno (1895) was an Eclipse-class protected cruiser launched in 1895 and sold in 1920.
- HMS Juno (F46) was a J-class destroyer launched in 1938 and sunk in an air attack off Crete in 1941.
- HMS Juno (F52) was a Leander-class frigate launched in 1965 and scrapped in 1994.

== See also ==
- HMS Junon
- MV Juno
- Juno (ship)
