= MV Maid of Skelmorlie =

History

United Kingdom
- Name: MV Maid of Skelmorlie; 1976: Ala
- Operator: Caledonian Steam Packet Company
- Port of registry: Glasgow, United Kingdom
- Route: 1953 – 1973: Clyde service; 1976 – 1995: Sorrento to Capri
- Builder: A & J Inglis, Pointhouse, Glasgow; Engine Builders: British Polar Engines
- Cost: £145,000
- Yard number: 1492
- Launched: 2 April 1953; by Mrs T F Cameron
- Identification: IMO number: 5217555; Call Sign: ITBU
- Fate: Broken up at Aliaga, Turkey in 2023

General characteristics
- Tonnage: 508 GT
- Length: 161.25 ft (49.15 m)
- Beam: 28 ft (8.5 m)
- Draught: 10 ft (3.0 m)
- Installed power: 2x Oil 2SCSA 6 cyl. 9 7/8" x 16 ½ "
- Propulsion: twin screws and rudders
- Speed: 15 knots
- Capacity: 624 passengers

MV Maid of Skelmorlie was a passenger ferry operated by Caledonian Steam Packet Company from 1953. Rendered redundant by the car ferry revolution, she was sold to Italian owners in 1973. After conversion to stern-loading, she operated, as Ala in the Bay of Naples for 20 years.

== History ==
Maid of Skelmorlie was the third of a quartet of passenger vessels ordered in 1951 to modernise the Clyde fleet, the second to be built by A & J Inglis of Pointhouse.

In September 1969, she was fitted out for the winter Kyles of Bute/Tarbert mail run from Gourock, acquiring small mail rooms forward of her saloon, and a temporary shelter over the galley for parcels and luggage. CSP took over this historic route from David MacBrayne from 1 October 1969. Her sister, MV Maid of Argyll was similarly modified.

== Layout ==
MV Maid of Skelmorlie had a forward observation lounge and an aft tearoom, both with large windows. A lower deck lounge was later converted to a bar. Open deck space available for passengers was limited. The bridge was forward on the promenade deck, with a landing platform above, for use at very low tides. She had two masts and a single funnel, above the central engines, with the galley aft.

Between 1973 and 1976, she was converted to a stern-loading ferry.

== Service ==
MV Maid of Skelmorlie initially assisted MV Maid of Argyll on Gourock – Rothesay duties and developed the afternoon cruise programme. She often did Wemyss Bay – Innellan runs and, on Mondays and Fridays took late afternoon sailing from Craigendoran to Rothesay. She ran various weekend connections to Tighnabruaich and a Saturday cruise to Lochgoilhead/Arrochar. She became increasingly associated with Wemyss Bay and Largs and their connexions to Rothesay and Millport.

In the late 1950s, the Maids lost their fixed routes and all operated across the Clyde network. They became progressively redundant as the car ferry revolution swept all before it. Maid of Skelmorlie spent more and more time laid up and was finally withdrawn at the end of the 1972 season and never wore the CalMac colours.

In April 1973, she was sold to an Italian concern and sailed for the Mediterranean (following removal of her funnel lions which were transferred to Jupiter). There she was converted to a stern-loading car ferry, and renamed the Ala. She had considerable success operating in the Bay of Naples, maintaining the Sorrento to Capri route for almost twenty years from early 1976. After the 1995 season, the Ala was laid up and took various charters: from 1997 to 1999 a winter cargo service to the Tremiti Islands in the Adriatic and in the summer of 2001 between Pozzuoli and the island of Procida, in the company of Capri Express, (ex MV Maid of Cumbrae). As late as 2004 she provided scheduled ferry service between Naples and Sorrento for the Navigazione Libera del Golfo line, before being laid up in Naples. She was scrapped at Aliağa in summer 2023.
