= Juno (ship) =

Several ships have been named Juno for the Roman goddess Juno.

- Juno (1793 ship) was launched at Hull as a West Indiaman. French privateers once detained her and once captured her, but the Royal Navy recaptured her. She made one voyage as a whaler in the Southern Whale Fishery, and then participated as a transport in a naval expedition. She then disappears from readily accessible records. However, she may be the ship Juno which sailed out of Bremen for the Seal Coast and Greenland in February 1853.
- Juno (1797 ship) was an English merchantman launched at Lancaster. A French frigate captured her in a notable single-ship action in 1804 off the American coast and later burnt her.
- PS Juno (1868), a twin funnelled iron-built paddle steamer on the Bristol to Cork run (1868–1900)
- PS Juno (1898), a Clyde paddle steamer
- PS Juno (1937), a Clyde steamer, requisitioned to serve as the auxiliary minesweeper HMS Helvellyn and declared a constructive loss after an enemy bombing raid over London in 1941

== See also ==
- MS Juno
- MV Juno – one of two motor vessels
- HMS Juno – one of seven vessels of the Royal Navy
