= MV Juno =

Various motor vessels have had the name Juno, including:

- MV Juno (1980), a Norwegian general cargo/container ship launched as MV Amazonia and later named MV Rainbow Hope and currently MV Geysir.
- MV Juno (1974), a Clyde car ferry that served Caledonian MacBrayne between 1974 and 2007, and sister ship of MV Jupiter.

== See also ==
- Juno
