= HMS Junon =

Two ships of the Royal Navy have borne the name HMS Junon, a French form of the goddess Juno, of Roman mythology:

- HMS Junon (1809) was a 36-gun fifth rate captured from the French in 1809, but retaken by them later that year.
- HMS Junon (1810) was a 38-gun fifth rate, previously the French Bellone. She was captured in 1810 and broken up in 1817.

== See also ==
- HMS Juno
