= MV Pioneer =

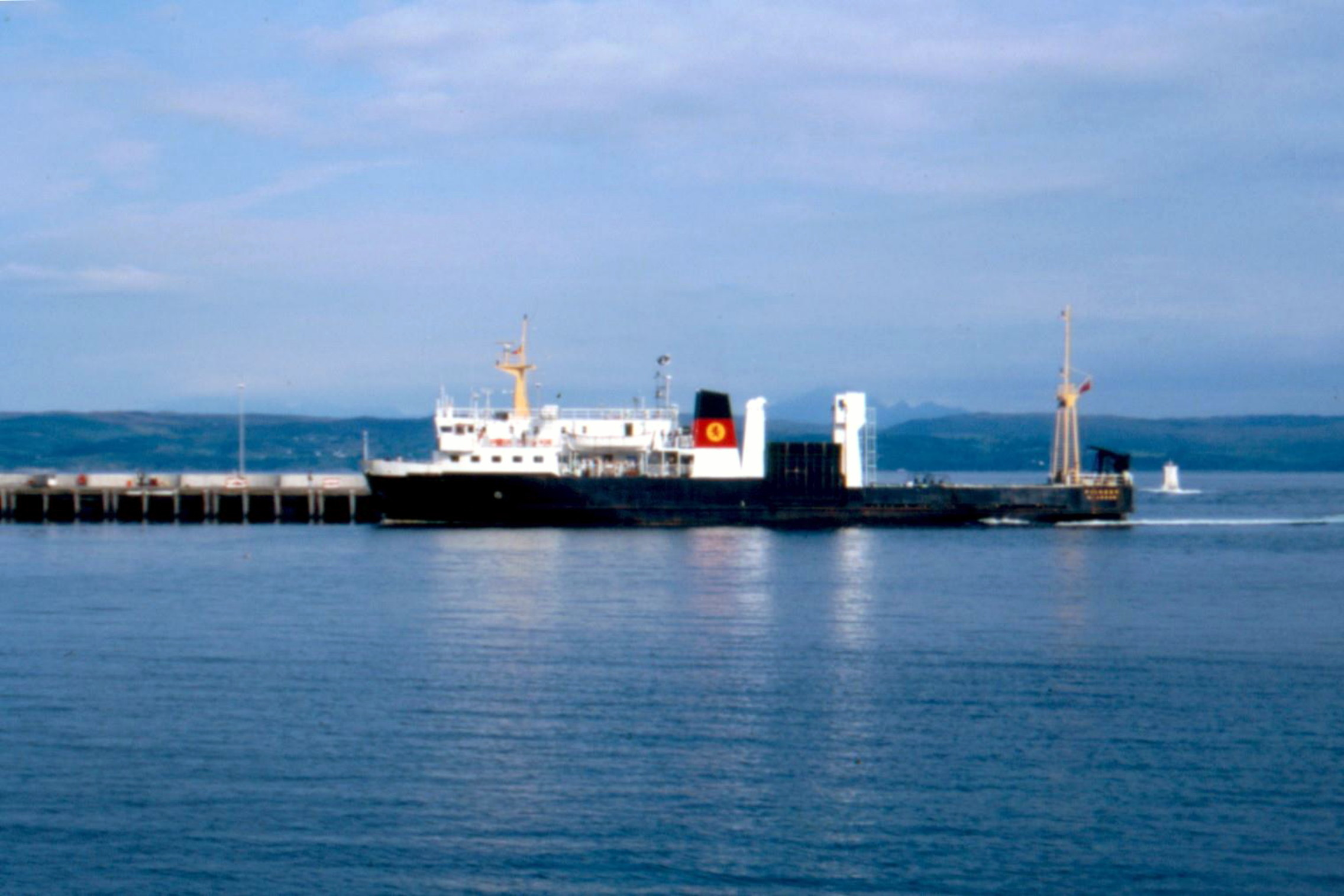
- MV Pioneer at Mallaig, 1987

History

United Kingdom
- Name: MV Pioneer; Scottish Gaelic: Treoraiche
- Namesake: 1905 paddle steamer on Islay run
- Owner: Scottish Transport Group (STG)
- Operator: Caledonian MacBrayne
- Port of registry: Glasgow
- Route: Islay and many other in Western Isles and Clyde
- Builder: Robb Caledon, Leith
- Cost: £1.000.000
- Yard number: 515
- Launched: 4 January 1974
- Christened: Mrs William Ross, wife of the then Scottish Secretary of State
- In service: 14 August 1974
- Out of service: 1 November 2003
- Home port: Glasgow
- Identification: Call sign GULB; IMO number: 7341178

General characteristics
- Type: Steel Double Screw Motor Vessel
- Tonnage: 1,088 GT
- Displacement: 1775Mt
- Length: 67.47 m (221 ft)
- Beam: 13.75 m (45 ft)
- Draft: 2.413 m (8 ft)
- Propulsion: Mirrlees Blackstone Diesels each 1700 S.H.P
- Speed: 16 kts
- Boats & landing craft carried: 2 lifeboats
- Capacity: 356/218 passengers, 32 cars
- Crew: 21

MV Pioneer is a stern / side loading ferry built in 1974, in service for 29 years covering nearly all of Caledonian MacBrayne's routes. She now serves the islands of São Tomé and Príncipe in the Gulf of Guinea and was chartered to rescue Liberian refugees.

== History ==
MV Pioneer was built to replace the smaller MV Arran between West Loch Tarbert and Port Ellen on Islay, in competition with unsubsidised Western Ferries. She was the longest vessel to operate this far up the loch. For ten years Pioneer rarely left the Islay roster. In 1978 CalMac took over the Western Ferries terminal at Kennacraig, three miles down the loch, and in February 1979, Pioneer was replaced by the larger MV Iona. During a refit at Leith, her two cranes were removed and two side-loading ramps were connected to a large car hoist, for use at terminals without linkspans, allowing her to replace the ageing MV Bute as the Mallaig - Armadale ferry. Her bridge deck was extended and her bridge wings clipped to help with loading.

After September 1979 Pioneer had a very varied life, covering nearly all of CalMac's routes. Relief sailings for the winter period remained the same over the years. She covered the Islay run in October, then spent three months on the Clyde, on the Kilcreggan run and assisting the Streakers, had her annual refit and then came back to cover the Small Isles service from Mallaig (the largest ship to operate on this service). She also gave a winter evening, passenger-only sailing from Largs to Brodick (Arran), until the arrival of MV Isle of Arran in 1984. Pioneer also had brief periods at Coll, Tiree, Barra, Colonsay, Canna, Lochboisdale, Lochmaddy, Craighouse and Lochaline for passenger and livestock runs. In the summer she was emergency relief on a variety of routes, including MV Columba's Oban to Colonsay run and an overnight run from Mallaig to the Outer Isles. Pioneer has also provided many charter trips, including to Campbeltown, Fort William and Skye.

In 1989 Pioneer was replaced at Mallaig by the MV Iona and became the company's spare vessel on the Upper Clyde, in place of MV Glen Sannox. At this time, Pioneer's hoist was removed and replaced with simple side ramps, allowing her to use the linkspans at Dunoon and Rothesay. In May 1988, she joined Iona to operate the Oban - Craignure, Mull link, when the much larger regular ship MV Isle of Mull was required to cover at Stornoway, before the new MV Isle of Lewis entered service.

In January 2003, after a brief overhaul in the James Watt Dock, she took up the Mallaig and Armadale crossing, awaiting the new ship, MV Coruisk. Due to technical difficulties the Coruisk had to make several trips to fitters for repairs, and Pioneer staying much longer than anticipated. Even a special two-day sentimental public cruise from the Western Isles to the Clyde via Oban had to be cancelled. On 1 November 2003 she made an unexpected return north to Mallaig to perform her final day of service with CalMac, covering the Small Isles roster. When she arrived back in Mallaig, the new MV Lochnevis awaited her. Pioneer headed for Gourock and on to Greenock's James Watt Dock - her final resting place with the company.

She was sold to Corlett Lines, in August 2004. Renamed Brenda Corlett, after the new owner's wife, she now serves the islands of São Tomé and Príncipe in the Gulf of Guinea, straddling the equator in West Africa. In 2006 she took almost three hundred Liberian refugees, and their belongings, home from the Ghanaian port of Tema. The ferry was chartered to lend assistance to a repatriation effort organised by the United Nations High Commissioner for Refugees.

== Layout ==
MV Pioneer resembled the three ferries, MV Jupiter, MV Juno and MV Saturn, (commonly known as 'the three streakers') which had been introduced on the Clyde. The passenger accommodation was forward and the open car deck aft. She sported two funnels amidships and her mainmast was a gantry right at the stern. She was fitted with twin controllable pitch propellers, twin rudders, stabilisers and bow thrusters. She was originally stern-loading only with a hydraulic stern ramp and two 3½ ton Hiab cargo cranes just abaft of the superstructure. To take over the Mallaig - Armadale (Skye) service, she was fitted with a hoist, allowing stern / side loading. The hoist was removed again in 1989.

== Service ==
Dates	Service
August 1974 - June 1978	West Loch Tarbert - Gigha - Islay
1975	Oban - Lochboisdale / Castlebay
June 1978 - February 1979	Kennacraig - Gigha - Islay
1979–1989	Mallaig - Armadale (Summer). Fleet Relief (Winter)
1981	Oban - Craignure, Oban - Lochboisdale / Castlebay
1980s	Oban - Lochaline, Tobermory, Coll / Tiree
1986	Uig - Tarbert - Lochmaddy
1988	Oban - Colonsay. Mallaig - Castlebay (Summer)
1998	Western Isles
1999–2001	Wemyss Bay - Rothesay. Upper Clyde Relief
2001	Upper Clyde Relief. Mallaig - Armadale
