= MV Juno (1974) =

Clyde-built passenger/vehicle ferry (1974 - 2007)

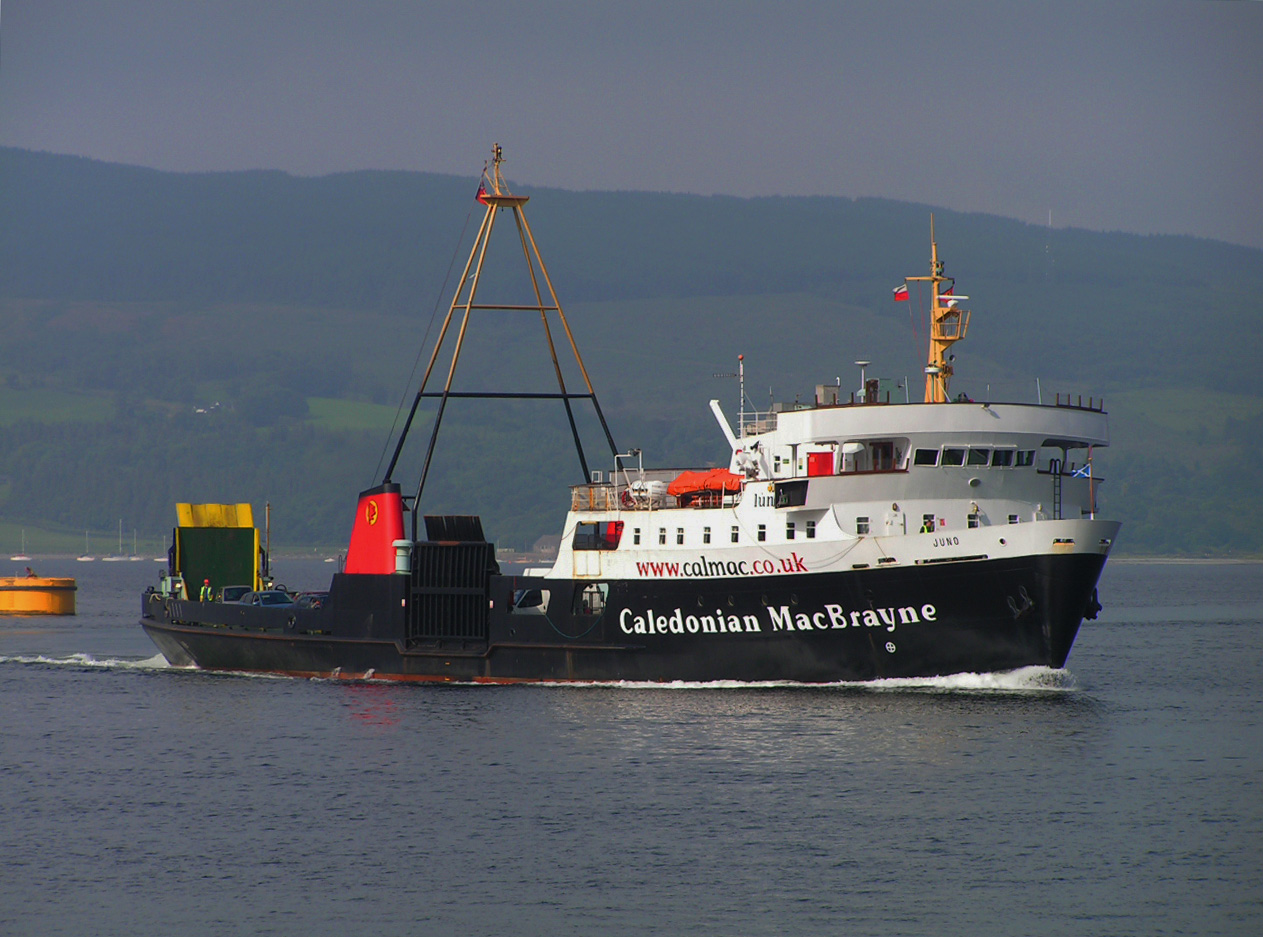
- MV Juno leaving Rothesay (June 2005)

History

United Kingdom
- Name: MV Juno
- Namesake: Juno and earlier vessels, MV Juno
- Operator: Caledonian MacBrayne
- Port of registry: Glasgow
- Route: Firth of Clyde; 1974–1986: Gourock-Dunoon; 1986–2000: Gourock-Dunoon/Rothesay-Wemyss Bay/Clyde Cruises; 2000–2006: Gourock-Dunoon/Rothesay-Wemyss Bay; 2007: Rothesay-Wemyss Bay; 2007–2011: Laid up, Rosneath
- Builder: James Lamont & Co, Port Glasgow
- Cost: £820,000
- Launched: 16 September 1974
- Maiden voyage: 2 December 1974
- Out of service: 22 April 2007
- Identification: IMO number: 7341063
- Fate: Scrapped at Rosneath, Gare Loch, May–July 2011.

General characteristics
- Tonnage: 854 GRT; 209 DWT
- Length: 66.45 m (218 ft 0 in)
- Beam: 13.8 m (45 ft 3 in)
- Draft: 2.41 m (7 ft 11 in)
- Depth: 4 m (13 ft)
- Installed power: 2 × Mirrlees Blackstone 4SCSA 8-cylinder diesel engines, 1,000 bhp (750 kW) each
- Propulsion: 2 Voith Schneider Propellers, one at each end of the hull, on the centreline
- Speed: approximately 12 kn (22 km/h)
- Capacity: 531 passengers, 38 cars
- Crew: 10

MV Juno was a passenger and vehicle ferry operated by Caledonian MacBrayne on the Firth of Clyde, Scotland between 1974 and 2007. She was the middle of three vessels nicknamed "streakers", the first in the Calmac fleet to be fitted with Voith Schneider Propellers . Juno left service in early 2007 and was laid up at Rosneath for 4 years. On 18 May 2011, she was beached there for scrapping and was gone by the end of July.

== History ==
MV Juno took to the water at Lamont's in Port Glasgow, on 16 September 1974 and was christened by Mrs W M Little, wife of the Managing Director of the Scottish Transport Group, Calmac's owning company at the time. She was remarkably similar to MV Jupiter, although her internal decoration was brighter, the ticket office faced fore rather than aft, and she had a curved flying bridge (although Jupiter soon incorporated such a bridge). This allowed the skipper a clearer view when berthing. Juno and Jupiter were remarkably manoeuvrable, being the first in the Calmac fleet to be fitted with Voith Schneider Propellers, which allowed the ships to literally turn within their own length. This was revolutionary in large vessels as they could berth and depart far quicker than many of the smaller vessels at the time. They would later become affectionately known as the three "streakers" after the arrival of MV Saturn in 1977.

Juno spent much of her first decade on the Gourock-Dunoon run, replacing the much smaller MV Maid of Cumbrae. In 1981, the then Secretary of State for Scotland offered the rival firm on the Hunter's Quay-Mclnroy's Point route, Western Ferries, a grant to buy an additional vessel to provide a frequent, high speed passenger-only service from Gourock to Dunoon. At this point, Calmac considered the termination of their route. This was disallowed, preventing an outrage among the residents of Dunoon and Gourock. This meant that Calmac needed a vessel to offer a passenger-only service on the route, but financially this was not an option. Instead, Calmac resumed service with Juno, but with only one sailing per hour. This allowed popularity to grow with Western Ferries, which would otherwise have been vulnerable to being put out of business by the frequent Calmac service.

From 1986, the "streakers", MV Jupiter, MV Saturn and Juno provided three rosters on the Upper Clyde: one each at Dunoon and Rothesay and the third (1A Roster) to Kilcreggan with peak sailings to Dunoon and Rothesay. Initially they interchanged roster each month, but this became weekly in 1996. With the introduction of MV Pioneer on the Clyde in summers, one of the "streakers" was freed up to carry out a series of cruises on weekday afternoons. From 1993, a cruise ran to Tighnabruaich twice a week, after the commuter runs. These were popular and the programme was extended to include Loch Long, the Kyles of Bute, with Tarbert, Loch Fyne on Sundays. The cruises were withdrawn in 2001, leaving two of the "streakers" serving Rothesay, and the other, Dunoon.

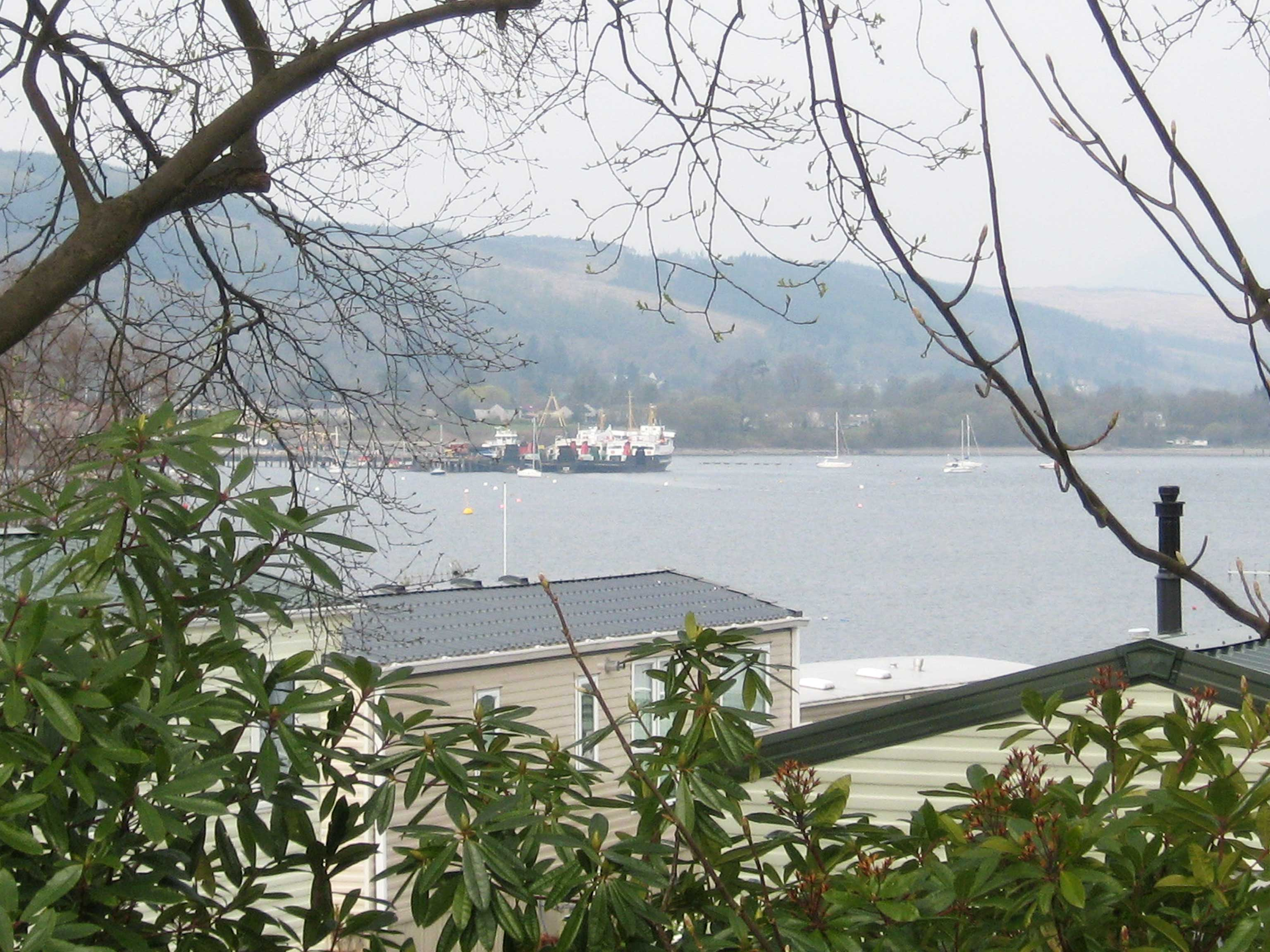
Looking over Rosneath bay to the former naval base, with Juno laid up at the pier and MV Saturn alongside.

== Final years ==
In July 2005, Juno was joined on the Rothesay to Wemyss Bay route by the new MV Bute. By early 2007, work was required at Rothesay and vessels had to be very cautious during berthing. The service was operated by Juno and Saturn, with their superior manoeuvrability compared with Bute. Her passenger certificate was to expire on 22 April and MV Argyle, Bute's new sistership was still fitting out in Poland. On 21 April 2007, Juno was displaced by Bute. The following day, she crossed to Rosneath pier on the Gare Loch and was never to sail for Caledonian MacBrayne again.

Juno remained laid up at Rosneath, where her condition slowly deteriorated. Functioning parts were used to keep MV Jupiter and MV Saturn operational. Juno was withdrawn first because her certification did not allow her to operate beyond Arran. In October 2010, she was joined by Jupiter, although Jupiter was kept in reserve, able to return to service if needed. This arrangement continued until the future of the Gourock to Dunoon service was known.

In February 2011, it was announced that Juno was to be scrapped. She moved under her own power onto the mud at Rosneath on 18 May 2011 where her scrapping commenced. By July 2011, she was gone, with her bell and lions preserved at the McLean Museum in Greenock.

== Layout ==
Juno had a large open car deck towards the stern and two internal passenger decks, as well as an open deck, built up on the front of the vessel. This allowed foot passengers to remain separate from the car deck which was level with the lower passenger deck. The upper passenger deck consisted of a small coffee cabin and games machines, with stairs leading down to the lower deck. The lower deck lounge had a ticket office (which closed following new regulations in 2005) and toilets aft, with doorways leading to the car deck. Juno had her accommodation renovated in 1993. The following year, her lifeboats were replaced by smaller life rafts to allow for more deck space.
