= MV Maid of Cumbrae =

History

United Kingdom
- Name: MV Maid of Cumbrae; 1979: Noce di Cocco; 1980: Capri Express
- Operator: Caledonian Steam Packet Company
- Port of registry: Glasgow, United Kingdom
- Route: 1953 – 1973: Clyde service; 1979 – 2006: Bay of Naples
- Builder: Ardrossan Dockyard; Engine Builders: British Polar Engines
- Cost: £145,000
- Yard number: 419
- Launched: 13 May 1953; by Mrs David Blee
- Maiden voyage: 18 July 1953
- Identification: IMO number: 5217529; Call Sign:
- Fate: Scrapped 2006

General characteristics
- Tonnage: 508 GT
- Length: 161 ft 3 in (49.15 m)
- Beam: 28 ft (8.5 m)
- Draught: 10 ft (3.0 m)
- Installed power: 2 × Oil 2SCSA 6 cyl. 9 7/8 in × 16 1/2 in (250 mm × 420 mm)
- Propulsion: twin screws and rudders
- Speed: 15 kn (28 km/h)
- Capacity: 625 passengers; from 1972: 15 cars

MV Maid of Cumbrae was a British passenger ferry operated by Caledonian Steam Packet Company from 1953. In the face of the car ferry revolution, in 1972, she was converted to a 15-car ferry for the Dunoon to Gourock crossing. Sold to Italian owners in 1978, she operated, as Capri Express in the Bay of Naples until 2006, when she was scrapped.

== History ==
Maid of Cumbrae was the last of a quartet of passenger vessels ordered in 1951 to modernise the Clyde fleet. She was built by Ardrossan Dockyard Ltd. As demand switched from short cruises to car ferries, in 1972, she was converted to operate as a 15-car ferry. She operated in this configuration for three years and was then sold in 1978, for a new career in the Adriatic.

== Layout ==
MV Maid of Cumbrae had a forward observation lounge and an aft tearoom, both with large windows. Open deck space available for passengers was limited. The bridge was forward on the promenade deck, with a landing platform above, for use at very low tides. She had two masts and a single funnel, above the central engines, with the galley aft.

To operate as a car ferry, the superstructure aft of her funnel was removed and two side-ramps, a stern ramp and a deck-turntable were fitted. Her passenger facilities were re-arranged. These modifications reduced her passenger certificate (Class V) to 310.

By the time she operated in the Bay of Naples, she had an inflatable swimming pool on the vehicle deck and a forward passenger lounge.

== Service ==
MV Maid of Cumbrae initially gave short cruises, including from Glasgow. On Saturdays she generally assisted on the hard-pressed Gourock – Dunoon service. In the late 1950s, the Maids lost their fixed routes and all operated across the Clyde network. They became progressively redundant as the car ferry revolution swept all before it. Maid of Cumbrae was withdrawn at the end of the 1971 season and laid-up in Glasgow's Princes Dock.

Plans to move MV Arran to Dunoon were thwarted and she was required to stay on the Islay service. To provide much needed vehicle capacity, in early 1972, Maid of Cumbrae was rapidly converted to a vehicle ferry and gave three years of reliable service, supporting MV Glen Sannox at Dunoon, until the arrival of the MV Juno in December 1974. She then became a spare vessel, relieving and taking charters until 20 May 1978, when she was laid up in the James Watt Dock, Greenock.

On 25 August 1978, complete with a spare propeller and shaft, she left the Clyde for the Adriatic. In 1979, as Noce di Cocco ("Coconut"), she entered service between Trieste and Muggia, operated by Navigazione Alto Adriatico, but still in Caledonian MacBrayne livery. She spent less than a year on this run, before moving to the Bay of Naples, as Capri Express. At first she cruised between Capri and Positano, later as a car ferry between Naples and Sorrento and from 2000, between Pozzuoli and Procida, in the company of her old sister Ala (ex MV Maid of Skelmorlie). Withdrawn in 2006, she was towed to Aliağa for scrapping and beached in March.
