= MV Jupiter (1973) =

Scottish passenger and vehicle ferry

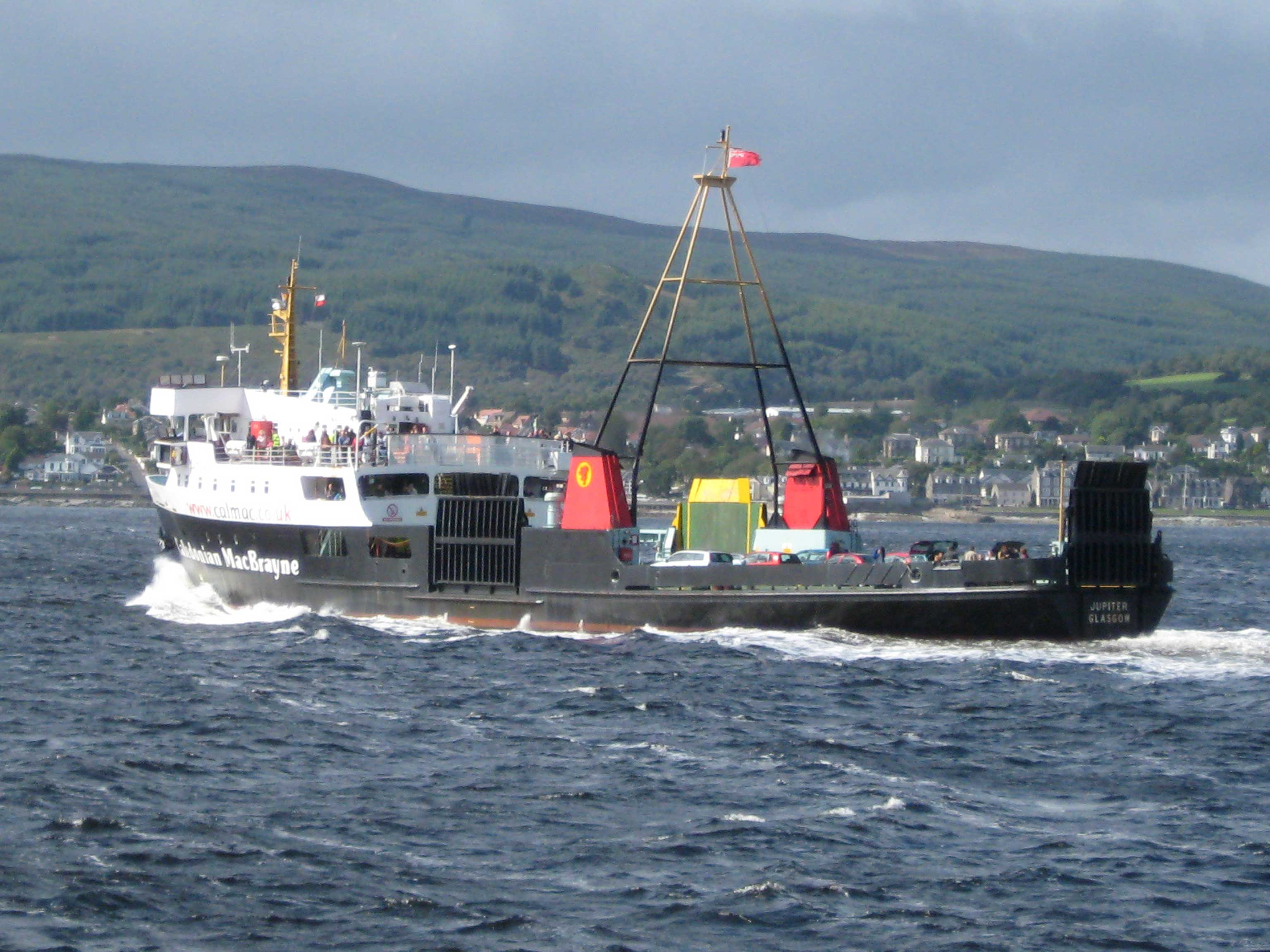
- MV Jupiter approaching Dunoon with passengers for the 2009 Cowal Highland Gathering.

History

United Kingdom
- Name: MV Jupiter
- Namesake: Jupiter and earlier vessels, MV Jupiter
- Operator: Caledonian MacBrayne
- Port of registry: Glasgow
- Route: Firth of Clyde; 1974–1986: Gourock-Dunoon; 1986–2000: Gourock-Dunoon/Rothesay-Wemyss Bay/Clyde Cruises; 2000–2005: Gourock-Dunoon/Rothesay-Wemyss Bay; 2006–2010: Gourock-Dunoon; 2010–2011: Laid up, Rosneath
- Builder: James Lamont & Co, Port Glasgow
- Cost: £750 000 (1973)
- Yard number: 418
- Launched: 27 November 1973
- Maiden voyage: 19 March 1974
- Out of service: 12 October 2010
- Identification: IMO number: 7341051; MMSI Number: 232003367; Callsign: MRVX8
- Fate: Scrapped in Grenaa, Denmark.

General characteristics
- Tonnage: 849 GRT; 203 DWT
- Length: 66.45 m (218 ft 0 in)
- Beam: 13.8 m (45 ft 3 in)
- Draft: 2.41 m (7 ft 11 in)
- Depth: 4 m (13 ft)
- Installed power: 2 × Mirrlees Blackstone 4SCSA 8-cylinder diesel engines, 1,000 bhp (746 kW) each
- Propulsion: 2 Voith Schneider propellers, one at each end of the hull, on the centreline
- Speed: approximately 12 kn (14 mph; 22 km/h)
- Capacity: 531 passengers, 38 cars
- Crew: 10

MV Jupiter was a passenger and vehicle ferry in the fleet of Caledonian MacBrayne in the Firth of Clyde, Scotland. She was the oldest of three "streakers" and the third River Clyde ship to bear the name 'Jupiter'. Her open car deck was accessible by stern and side ramps ro-ro. She entered service in 1974, and operated the Gourock to Dunoon crossing for much of her career. In 2006, she became the oldest vessel in the CalMac fleet and continued in service with them until 2010. Jupiter was sold for breaking in 2011.

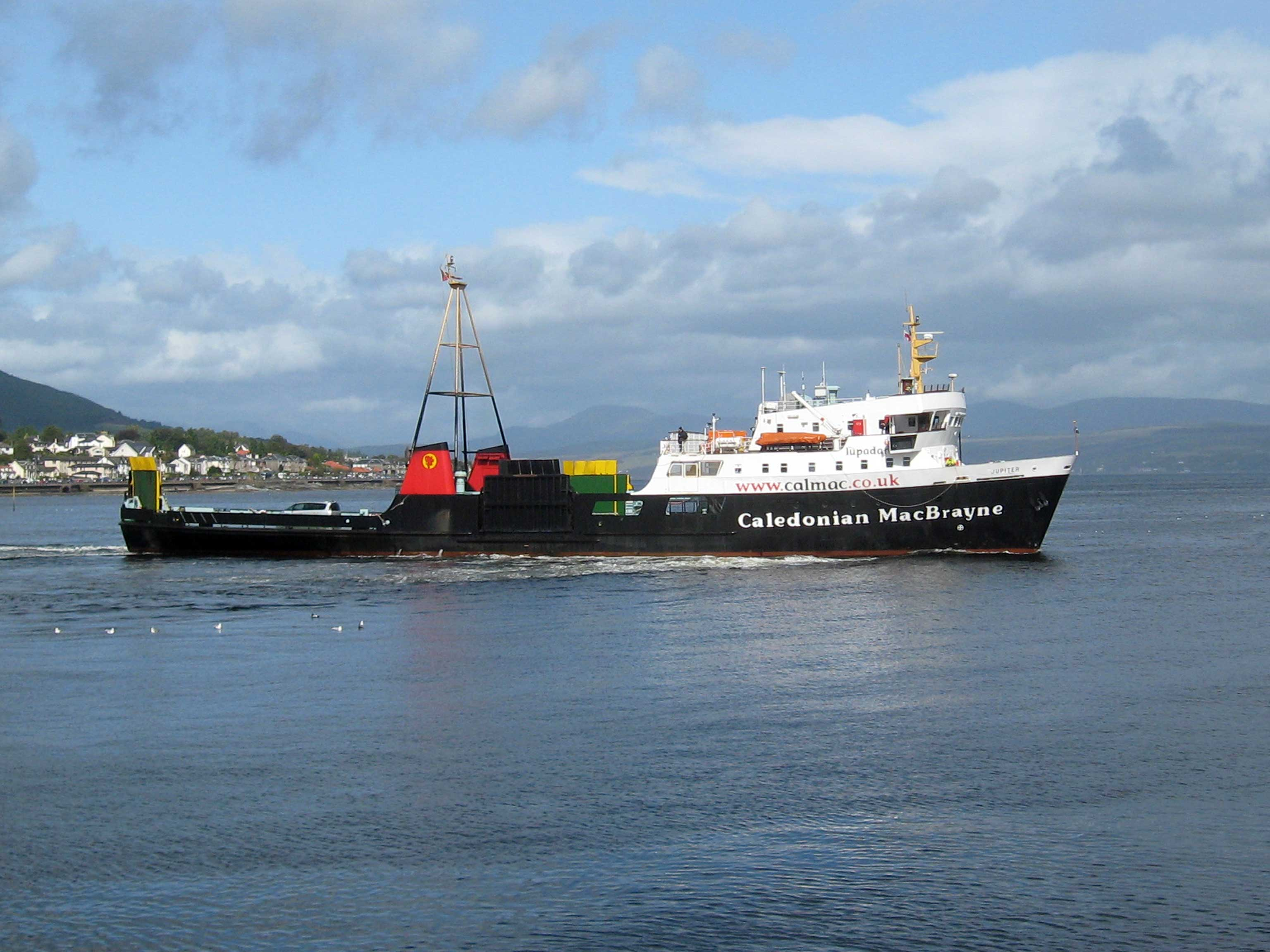
Jupiter in 2009

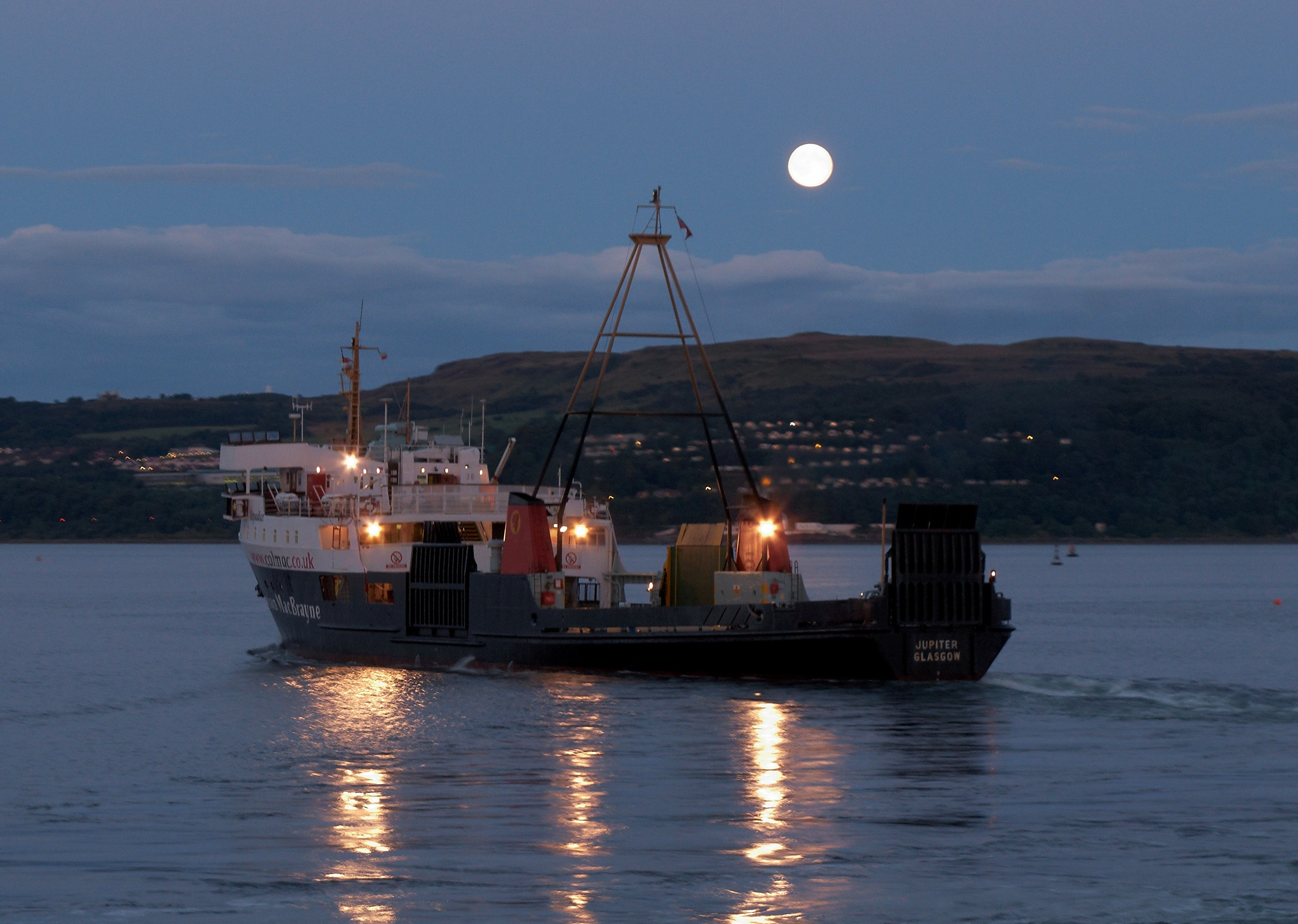
Twilight view, 25 August 2010

== History and layout ==
MV Jupiter was the first of a new generation of car ferries built in the 1970s to serve the routes on the Firth of Clyde. These ships came to be nicknamed the "Streakers" because of their greater speed (compared to what had served the area's routes previously) and superb manoeuvrability (due to her novel propulsion units, which greatly reduced loading and unloading times at each end of her route).

Jupiter incorporated a large open car deck towards the stern, with enclosed passenger accommodation and services towards the bow across three decks. Her design was of the roll-on/roll-off type (and technically drive-through, even though not through conventionally from bow to stern), with cars driving on via either the stern ramp or via one of the amidships ramps on the starboard side and the (rarely used) port side. Usual operation was to stern-load at Gourock and Wemyss Bay, and side-load via the starboard ramp at Dunoon and Rothesay.

The ship housed two passenger lounges, one with a cafeteria. There was crew accommodation on the upper deck.

The ship sported a "flying bridge", an additional deck directly above the main bridge with platforms extending to port and starboard, allowing the crew a better view of the ship's approach to piers during docking. The flying bridge was not an original feature of the Jupiter; it was an innovation integral to the design of younger sister ship MV Juno (launched in September 1974) that was felt so useful it was retrofitted to Jupiter during her first annual refit.

== Service ==
Alongside her younger sister ship, MV Juno, and the third "streaker", MV Saturn, Jupiter operated the Upper Firth routes from the mid-1970s. Jupiter primarily operated the Gourock to Dunoon crossing on the upper firth. For much of her first decade of operation, the phrase "Gourock-Dunoon Ferry" was emblazoned on her hull. Following government rule that the Calmac Gourock-Dunoon service was to be limited to one sailing per hour Jupiter was displaced and operated peak services between Ardrossan–Brodick to assist the ageing vessel operating that service until 1984. She also operated the Wemyss Bay to Rothesay route slightly further downriver from Gourock, regularly from 1986.

As well as normal car ferry duties, Jupiter also undertook many special, passenger-only cruise voyages to various locations in the Firth of Clyde and surrounding areas. In the 1980s and 1990s such cruises were regular occurrences in the summer months, with destinations such as Largs and Tighnabruiach seeing visits from Jupiter or one of her sister ships.

Just as the 1970s saw the Streakers replace an earlier generation, in the 21st century they in turn were replaced by a new generation of CalMac ferries designed for the Upper Firth. In 2005, the MV Bute entered service on the Wemyss Bay–Rothesay service. From that summer Saturn operated additional Ardrossan–Brodick sailings throughout the summer months to resolve capacity issues. Meanwhile in 2005, Jupiter and Juno continued to swap between running the Dunoon and Rothesay services weekly. Following Cowal Games Day Saturday of 2005 only one 'streaker' was required for service and Jupiter was laid up at Rosneath for that winter. It was thought at the time that a sister ship to Bute, MV Argyle would enter service in the summer 2006 and that Jupiter would not see service again, however delays in construction meant that Jupiter was to see service again the following summer, this time solely on the Gourock–Dunoon crossing. Unlike the previous winter, 2006 and the years following saw Jupiter in service year-round at Dunoon with other sisters Juno and Saturn laid up in the winter months. 2007 saw the arrival of Argyle, making one streaker obsolete. This was to be sister ship Juno which was laid up at Rosneath permanently; her only use being as a source of spare parts for her sisters. After her overhaul in May 2010, Jupiter lay up at Largs pier along with MV Loch Shira and MV Loch Riddon for one night as MV Argyle was at Gourock while Rothesay Pier underwent some maintenance.

Jupiter and Saturn continued in service, with Jupiter acting as the year-round Dunoon vessel and Saturn acting as relief vessel throughout the winter and providing additional Arran sailings in summer. This was the arrangement until 2010 when the future of the Gourock–Dunoon vehicle service came under doubt. As it was assumed no vehicle service would operate beyond June 2011, following the end of the 2010 summer season another streaker became obsolete. It was decided that Saturn would take over the Gourock–Dunoon service for that winter and on the morning of 12 October 2010, Jupiter was retired after over 36 years of service with CalMac. She was laid up alongside Juno later that day and although kept as a relief vessel that winter, Jupiter never saw passenger service again. In March 2011 Jupiter underwent sea trials in the Firth of Clyde to determine the success of a gearbox transplant from Juno. It had been announced the previous month that Juno was to be scrapped after years of lay-up, and on 18 May 2011 Jupiter cleared the pier at Rosneath to allow Juno to be beached for scrap.

On 31 May 2011, following the announcement that the Gourock–Dunoon ferry service would become passenger-only from the end of June, it was announced that Jupiter was to be scrapped. In June 2011, she was sold to Fornaes Shipbreaking of Denmark to be broken up and recycled in compliance with the DEFRA UK ship recycling strategy. On 25 June 2011, Jupiter departed the Clyde under tow for Denmark, and arrived in Grenaa, Denmark on 1 July. Scrapping was completed in October 2011.
