= MV Carvoria =

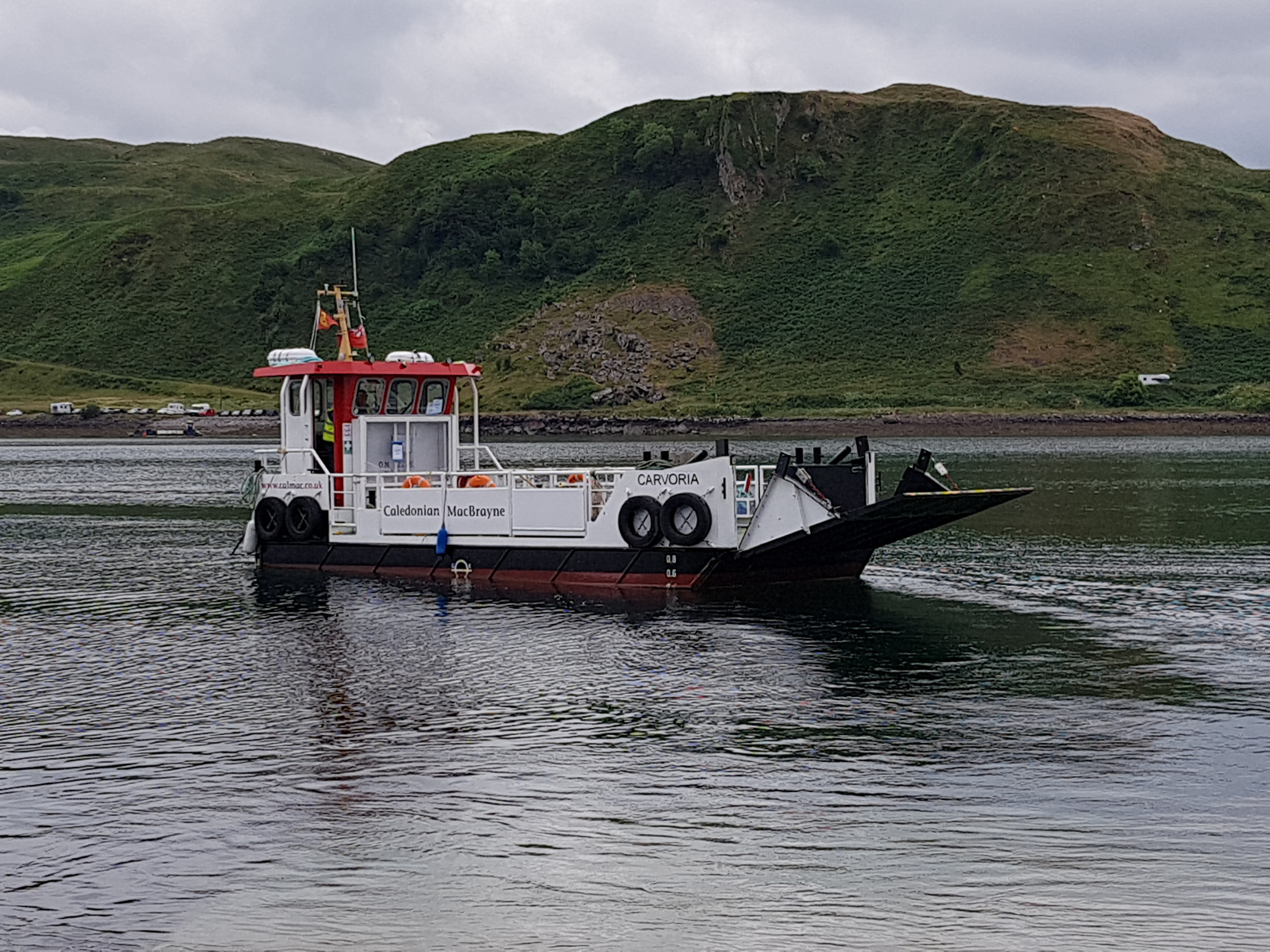
- MV Carvoria

History

United Kingdom
- Name: MV Carvoria
- Namesake: Old Norse name for Kerrera
- Owner: Caledonian Maritime Assets
- Operator: Caledonian MacBrayne
- Port of registry: Glasgow
- Route: Gallanach (Oban) - Kerrera
- Ordered: 2017
- Builder: Malakoff Limited
- Cost: £200,000
- Launched: 15 August 2017
- Completed: 2017
- In service: 5 September 2017
- Status: in service

General characteristics
- Type: landing craft
- Tonnage: 7.3 GT
- Length: 12 m (39 ft)
- Beam: 4 m (13 ft)
- Draught: 0.55 m (1 ft 10 in)
- Propulsion: 2 × Honda 80 hp (60 kW) long-stroke outboards
- Speed: 10.5 kn (19.4 km/h)
- Capacity: 12 passengers; 1 car

MV Carvoria is a landing craft owned by Caledonian Maritime Assets Limited, and operated by Caledonian MacBrayne in Scotland. She was launched in August 2017, and is the smallest vessel in the CalMac fleet.

== History ==
Carvoria was built to operate the ferry service between the small island of Kerrera and the mainland at Gallanach, about three kilometres to the south of Oban. The 12-metre-long vessel has capacity for 12 passengers and a car, but due to vehicle restrictions on Kerrera she rarely carries cars.

She was built by Malakoff Limited at its shipyard at Greenhead Base in Lerwick, Shetland. She replaced the former ferry Gylen Lady, which dated from 1999, shortly after CalMac took over the service in 2017.
