= MV Maid of Argyll =

1953 Scottish ferry

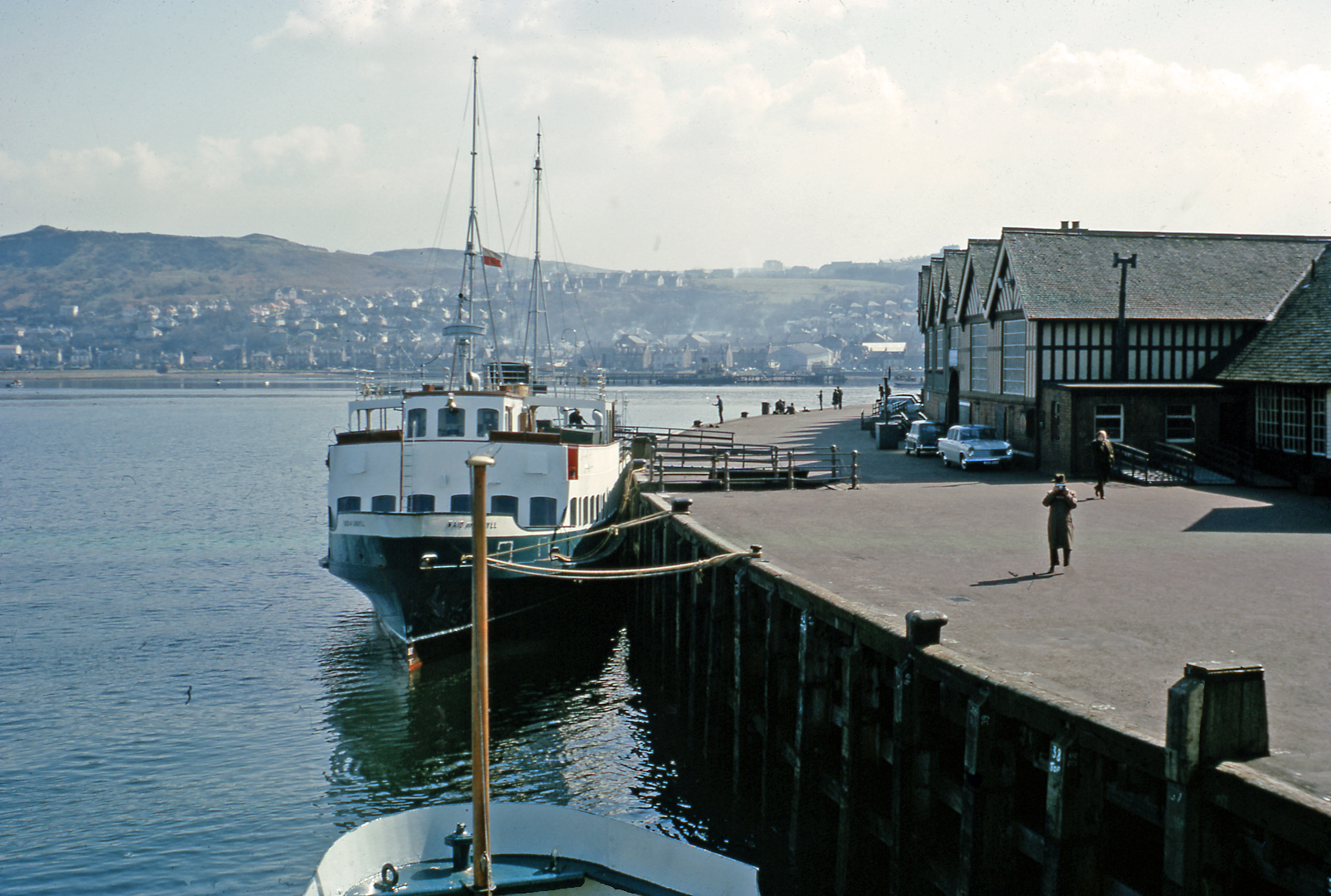
- The Maid of Argyll, seen from another Maid at Gourock pier

History

United Kingdom
- Name: MV Maid of Argyll; 1975: City of Piraeus; 1993: City of Corfu
- Operator: Caledonian Steam Packet Company
- Port of registry: Glasgow, United Kingdom
- Route: Gourock – Holy Loch service
- Builder: A & J Inglis, Glasgow; Engine Builders: British Polar Engines
- Cost: £145,000
- Yard number: 1491
- Launched: 4 March 1953; by Mrs F A Pope
- In service: 25 May 1953
- Out of service: 12 September 1973
- Identification: IMO number: 5217490
- Fate: Sold to Greece; destroyed by fire

General characteristics
- Tonnage: 508 GT
- Length: 161.25 ft (49.15 m)
- Beam: 28 ft (8.5 m)
- Draft: 5 ft 8 in (1.73 m)
- Installed power: 2 × oil 2SC SA 6 cylinder 9 7/8" × 16 ½"
- Propulsion: twin screws
- Speed: 15 knots (28 km/h)
- Capacity: 627 passengers

MV Maid of Argyll was a passenger ferry operated by Caledonian Steam Packet Company, initially based at Craigendoran. Rendered redundant by the car ferry revolution, she was sold to Greek owners in 1975. She caught fire in 1997 and was left to decay.

== History ==
Maid of Argyll was the second of a quartet of passenger vessels ordered in 1951 to modernise the Clyde fleet. Built by A & J Inglis of Glasgow, it was launched on 4 March 1953.

She was the only ship of the quartet to survive unaltered into the Caledonian MacBrayne era with the new livery. This only lasted one season and she made her last Clyde sailing on 12 September 1973. After a lay-up through the winter, she was sold to Cycladic Cruises of Piraeus on 1 March 1974. As City of Piraeus, she sailed from Flisvos marina on day cruises to the Saronic Islands, Aegina, Poros and Hydra. Her landing platform was extended to make a little upper deck and by 1978, it ran almost to the stern, serving as a sun deck. She was relieving City of Hydra, the former MacBrayne's Claymore. About 1989, she moved to Corfu, sailing for Aronis Coastal Cruises. As City of Corfu, she ran excursions to the island of Paxos, and the port of Parga on the Greek mainland. In 1997, City of Corfu suffered a serious fire and did not sail again. In 2002, she was partially submerged and decomposing at her berth.

== Layout ==
Maid of Argyll had a forward observation lounge and an aft tearoom, both with large windows. A lower deck lounge was later converted to a bar. Open deck space available for passengers was limited. The bridge was forward on the promenade deck, with a landing platform above, for use at very low tides. She had two masts and a single funnel, above the central engines, with the galley aft.

== Service ==
Maid of Argyll was initially based at Craigendoran, with runs to Gourock, Dunoon, Innellan and Rothesay. On Saturdays, she took the Lochgoilhead/Arrochar leg of the "Three Lochs Tour", releasing PS Waverley to carry larger numbers of passengers to Dunoon and Rothesay. In the late 1950s, the Maids lost their fixed routes and all operated across the Clyde network.

From February to May 1970, Maid of Argyll was the Kyles of Bute/Tarbert Royal Mail ship. She acquired the locked mail-room partitions and parcel/luggage shelter first fitted on her sister, Maid of Skelmorlie on the same duty, which CSP had assumed from David MacBrayne Ltd the previous October.
