= Ardmore, Barra =

Ardmhor: Scottish Gaelic: Aird Mhòr
- Location within the Outer Hebrides
- OS grid reference: NF721037
- Council area: Na h-Eileanan Siar
- Lieutenancy area: Western Isles
- Country: Scotland
- Sovereign state: United Kingdom
- Post town: ISLE OF BARRA
- Postcode district: HS9
- Dialling code: 01871
- Police: Scotland
- Fire: Scottish
- Ambulance: Scottish
- UK Parliament: Na h-Eileanan an Iar
- Scottish Parliament: Na h-Eileanan an Iar

Ardmore Point Lighthouse
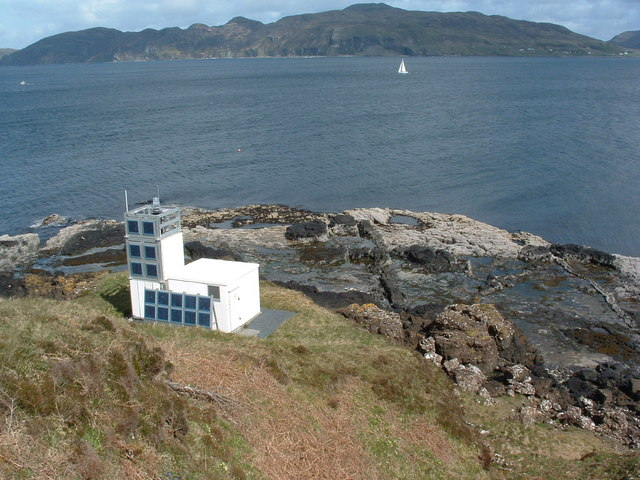
- Ardmore Point Lighthouse
- Location: Ardmore Point; Barra; Outer Hebrides; Scotland; United Kingdom
- Coordinates: 56.656041°N 6.128611°W

Tower
- Constructed: 1958 (first)
- Construction: metal skeletal tower
- Automated: 2003
- Height: 5 metres (16 ft)
- Shape: quadrangular tower with aluminium panels as daymark
- Markings: white tower
- Power source: solar power
- Operator: Northern Lighthouse Board

Light
- First lit: 2003 (current)
- Deactivated: 2003 (first)
- Focal height: 18 metres (59 ft)
- Range: 13 nautical miles (24 km; 15 mi)
- Characteristic: Fl (2) W 10s.

Ardmhor (Scottish Gaelic: Àird Mhòr) is a small village in the north east of the Isle of Barra in the Outer Hebrides, Scotland.

In 2002 a small ferry port was built in the village to serve a new ferry link between Barra and Eriskay as part of the Sound of Barra Integrated Transport Project. The ferry service started in spring 2003. A causeway had previously been built linking Eriskay to South Uist. The daily service on the MV Loch Alainn has frequent sailings; the crossing takes approximately 40 minutes. Since 2016, when the Oban–Lochboisdale service ceased, it is the only ferry between Barra and South Uist.

Note that the correct location for the port is as follows, rather than at Aird Mhidhinis as shown on some printed Ordnance Survey maps.

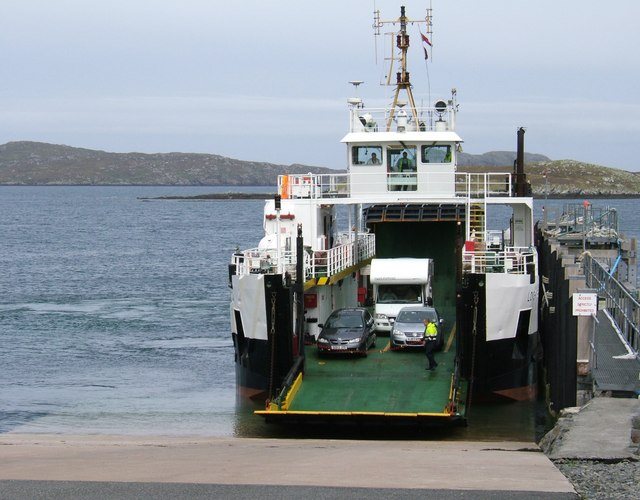
Ardmhor - Eriskay ferry.

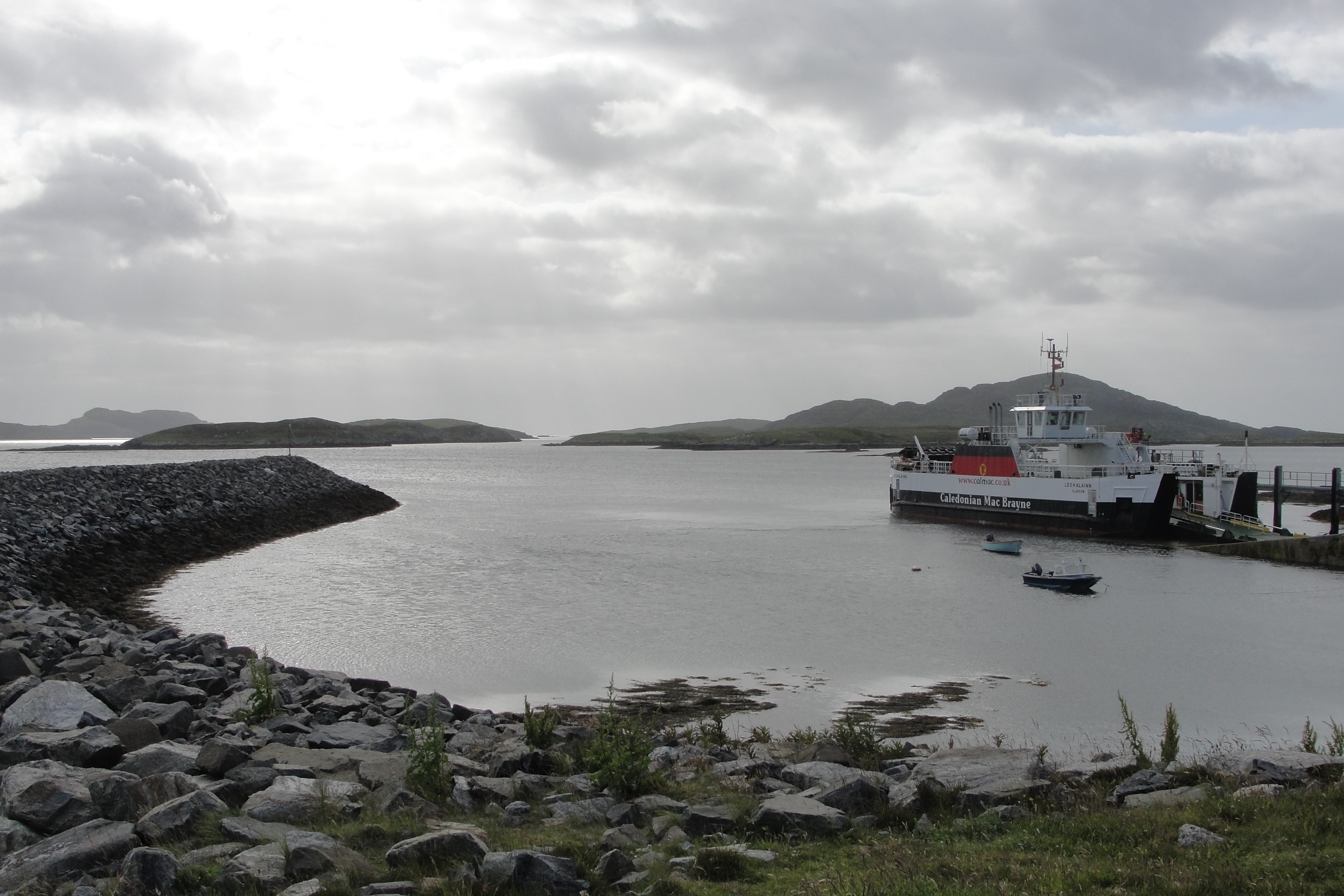
Ardmhor jetty and breakwater

== See also ==
- List of lighthouses in Scotland
- List of Northern Lighthouse Board lighthouses
