= MV Argyle =

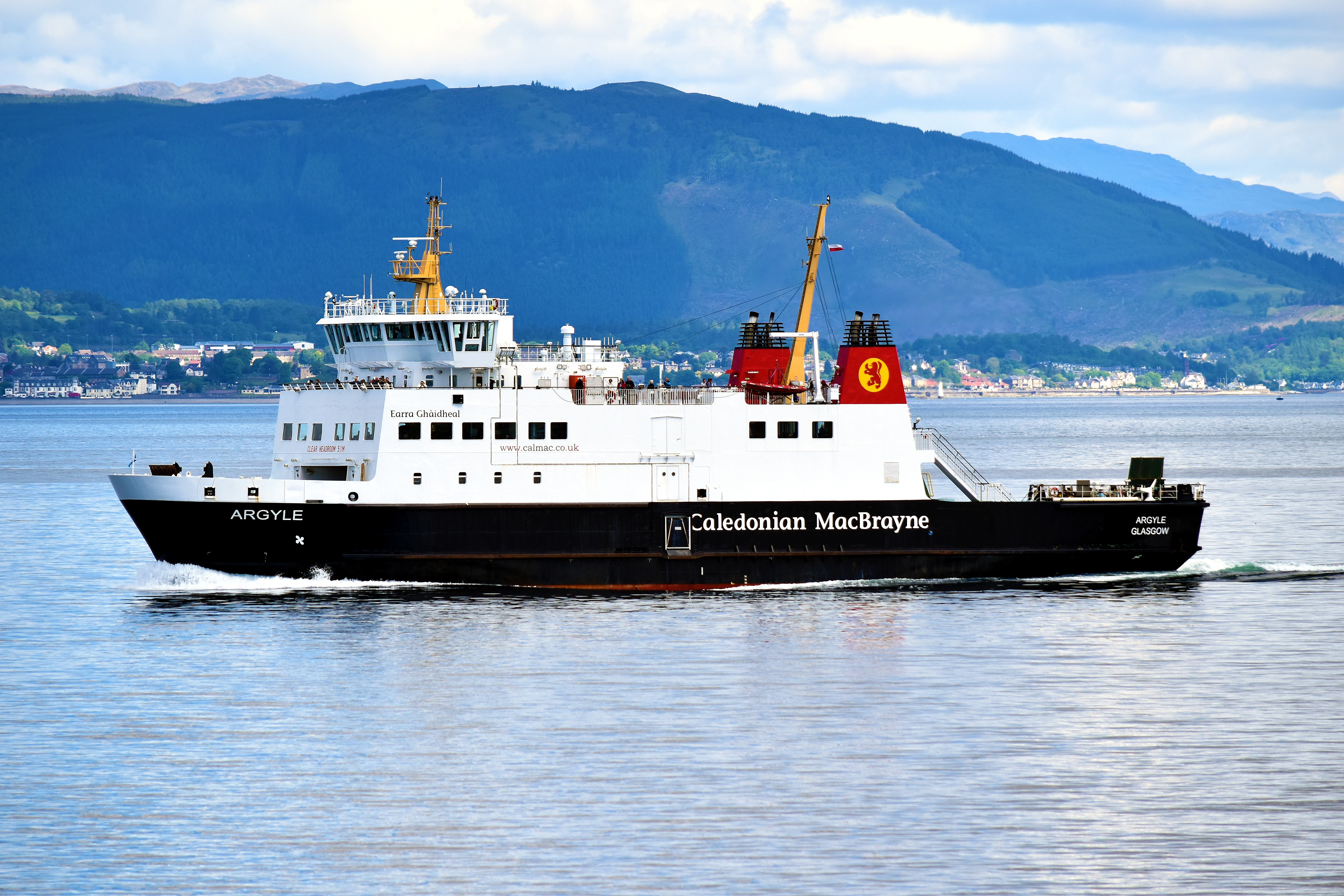
- Sailing from Wemyss Bay to Rothesay, May 2019.

History

United Kingdom
- Name: MV Argyle; Scottish Gaelic: Earra-Ghàidheal
- Owner: Caledonian Maritime Assets Limited
- Operator: Caledonian MacBrayne
- Port of registry: Glasgow, United Kingdom
- Route: Wemyss Bay - Rothesay
- Builder: Remontowa (Gdańsk, Poland)
- Cost: £9 million
- Launched: 12 September 2006
- Christened: 4 May 2007; at Rothesay by Mrs Tish Timms, wife of CalMac Chairman Peter Timms
- Maiden voyage: 16 May 2007
- Identification: IMO number: 9365178; MMSI number: 235052541; Callsign: MQEZ7
- Status: in service

General characteristics
- Class & type: Ro-ro passenger ferry
- Tonnage: 2,643
- Length: 72 m
- Beam: 15.3 m
- Draft: 3 m
- Speed: 18 kn (33 km/h)
- Capacity: 450 passengers, 60 cars

MV Argyle (Scottish Gaelic: Earra-Ghàidheal) is a ferry operated by Caledonian MacBrayne on the route between Wemyss Bay on the Scottish mainland and Rothesay on the Isle of Bute ('Sea Road to Rothesay'). She is the seventh Clyde ship to have the name Argyle.

== History ==
Until 2007, there had not been an Argyle on the Clyde for over a hundred years, but the present vessel is the seventh of the name. The first was a paddle steamer built only two years after the pioneer steamship PS Comet appeared on the river in 1812. The second was commissioned in 1815; the third and fourth had connections with Loch Fyne, while the fifth was a cargo steamer sailing to the Outer Hebrides.

In the mid-nineteenth century the spelling of the county changed to Argyll. The old spelling, however, is appropriate as the ship’s most prominent ancestor was a paddle steamer built in 1866 and sold by her original owner within a month to the Wemyss Bay Steam Boat Company. She was the successor to their PS Bute and remained on the Wemyss Bay route for almost quarter of a century.

Built in Poland, she was launched on 12 September 2006. Following delivery, the fitting out process took into account design modifications based on lessons learned from Bute. She was formally named at Rothesay Bay on 4 May 2007 before joining the Caledonian MacBrayne fleet later in the month.

== Layout ==
MV Argyle has a semi-open car deck with a clearance height of 5.1 m (16 ft 9 in). Like the MV Coruisk before her, she has bow and stern access and in addition she has a starboard vehicle ramp aft which was used at Rothesay before the pier was converted to allow end-loading.

Passenger accommodation is located on two levels, the first housing forward and aft lounges with a kiosk area and toilets between, while the second level is open deck space from the twin funnels to just forward of the bridge. The bridge sits on its own perch above the open deck.

Superficially there is very little to differentiate Argyle from Bute. Argyle has a second lift from the car deck and the passenger lounge is a little larger than on her sister.

== Service ==
Argyle operates the route between Wemyss Bay and Rothesay on the Isle of Bute, joining her sister ship MV Bute, already on the route, in May 2007. Being more manoeuvrable than the new vessels, the streakers MV Juno and MV Saturn returned to provide the service during work to build a new end-loading linkspan at Rothesay pier in 2007.

In May 2015, Argyle encountered some technical problems and broke down mid-firth. What is usually a 35-minute crossing took 5 hours for her to finally berth in Rothesay, where she berthed bow-in and undertook repairs. In June 2015 her turbo charger had a problem that led to a massive amount of smoke coming out of her engine room. She diverted back to Wemyss Bay and berthed stern in while fire fighters, ambulance and police were at the scene. There were no casualties and Argyle was later towed to James Watt Dock in Greenock, and she was back in service a week later.

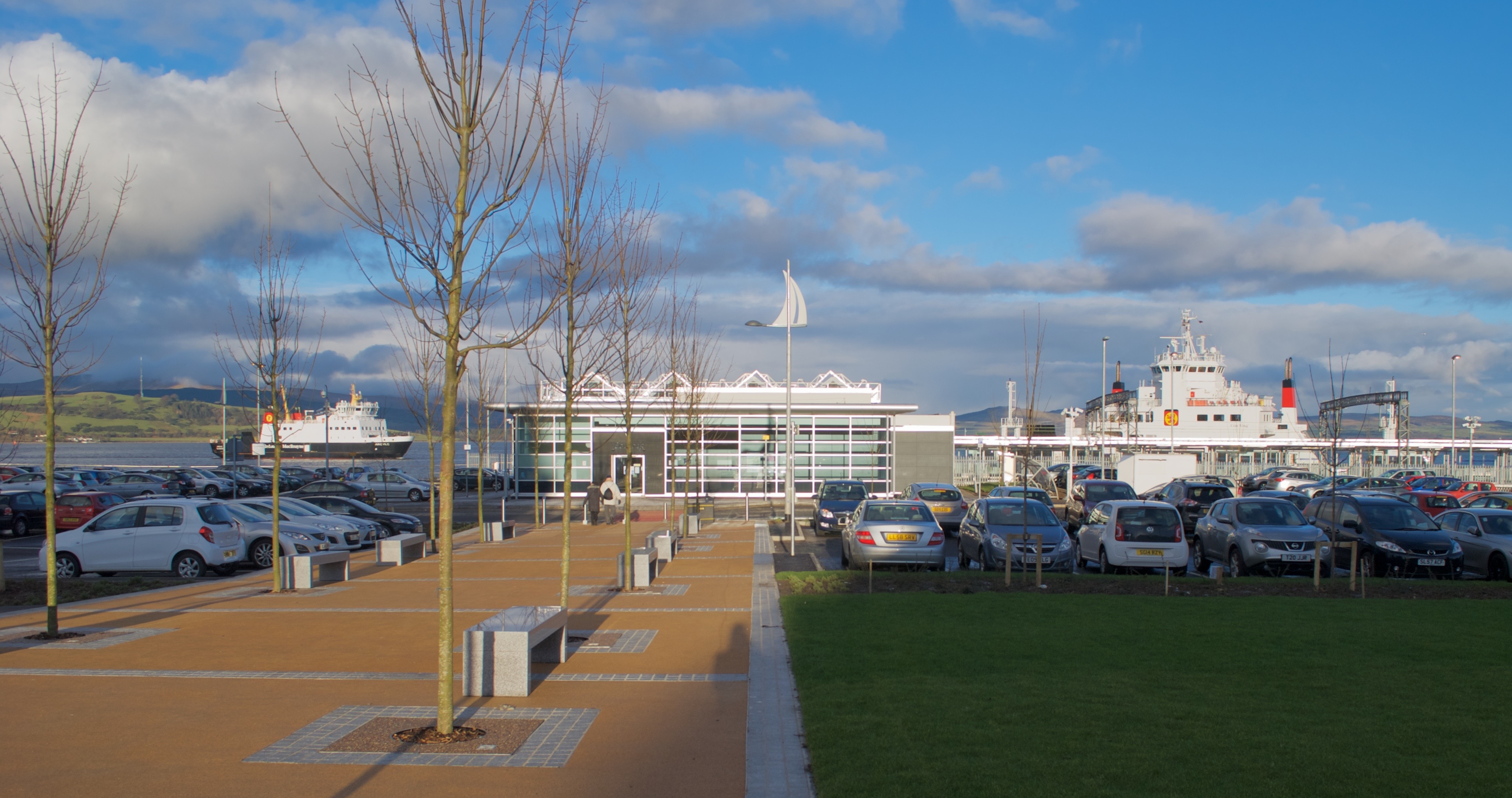
Argyle crossing to Gourock, February 2016.

Because of works at Wemyss Bay pier, Argyle and Bute were temporarily relocated to Gourock in October 2015, making each crossing an hour long. Services resumed from Wemyss Bay in March 2016, after a £6 million pier upgrade was completed.
