= Herd & McKenzie Shipbuilders =

- Company type: Private
- Industry: Shipbuilding
- Founded: 1903
- Founder: James Herd & Thomas McKenzie
- Headquarters: Buckie, UK
- Key people: Colin Taylor
- Website: http://www.buckieshipyard.com/index.htm

Herd & McKenzie, later Buckie Shipyard Ltd, were shipbuilders and repairers in Buckie, Moray, Scotland.

== History ==
James Herd & Thomas McKenzie started building boats at the Crooked Hythe in Findochty in 1903. Between 1905 and 1915 they built 32 steam drifters. In 1918, the firm moved from Findochty to a new yard in Buckie, at the eastern end of Cluny Harbour.

Buckie Shipyard was latterly part of the Lithgow Group.

It was announced on 23 August 2013 that the Buckie Shipbuilders had gone into administration with 68 of the 74 staff being made redundant immediately.

== Services ==
Buckie Shipyard built, converted, refitted and repaired ferries, tugs, workboats, yachts, pilot boats, MOD vessels, small cruise vessels, diving vessels, lifeboats, fishing boats and fish farm cages. They slipped vessels up to 850 tonnes in displacement and 70 metres in length. A new 1,600 sq. metres refit facility opened in 2003, including a state-of-the-art temperature and humidity controlled paint spray booth, capable of taking vessels up to 21m in length, 6m in beam and up to 50 tonnes. A 50-ton hydraulic slipway hoist transported vessels directly from the inner basin at Buckie Harbour into the refit hall.

The Royal National Lifeboat Institution had been a major client for over 60 years, with all classes of RNLI lifeboat undergoing refit.

In its last few years the yard delivered two aluminium windfarm service catamarans, Penmon Point and Lynas Point to Turbine Transfers, for work in Belgium and similar vessels followed.

== Ships built ==
Yard No	Name	Type	Launch	Notes
	Captain Scott	Sail training schooner	1971	For the Dulverton Trust now Shabab Oman with Royal Navy of Oman
	Kesteven	Fishing vessel	1973	GY277
	Edlei	Fishing vessel	1975	GY455
	Aubretia	Fishing vessel	1986	BCK32
	Bonaventure	Fishing vessel	1987	LH111
	MV Loch Alainn	Ferry	4 April 1997	For Caledonian MacBrayne
	Penmon Point	Aluminium catamaran	2010	For Turbine Transfers
	Lynas Point	Aluminium catamaran	2010	For Turbine Transfers
Source: Ship Photos
