= MV Bute =

Ferry

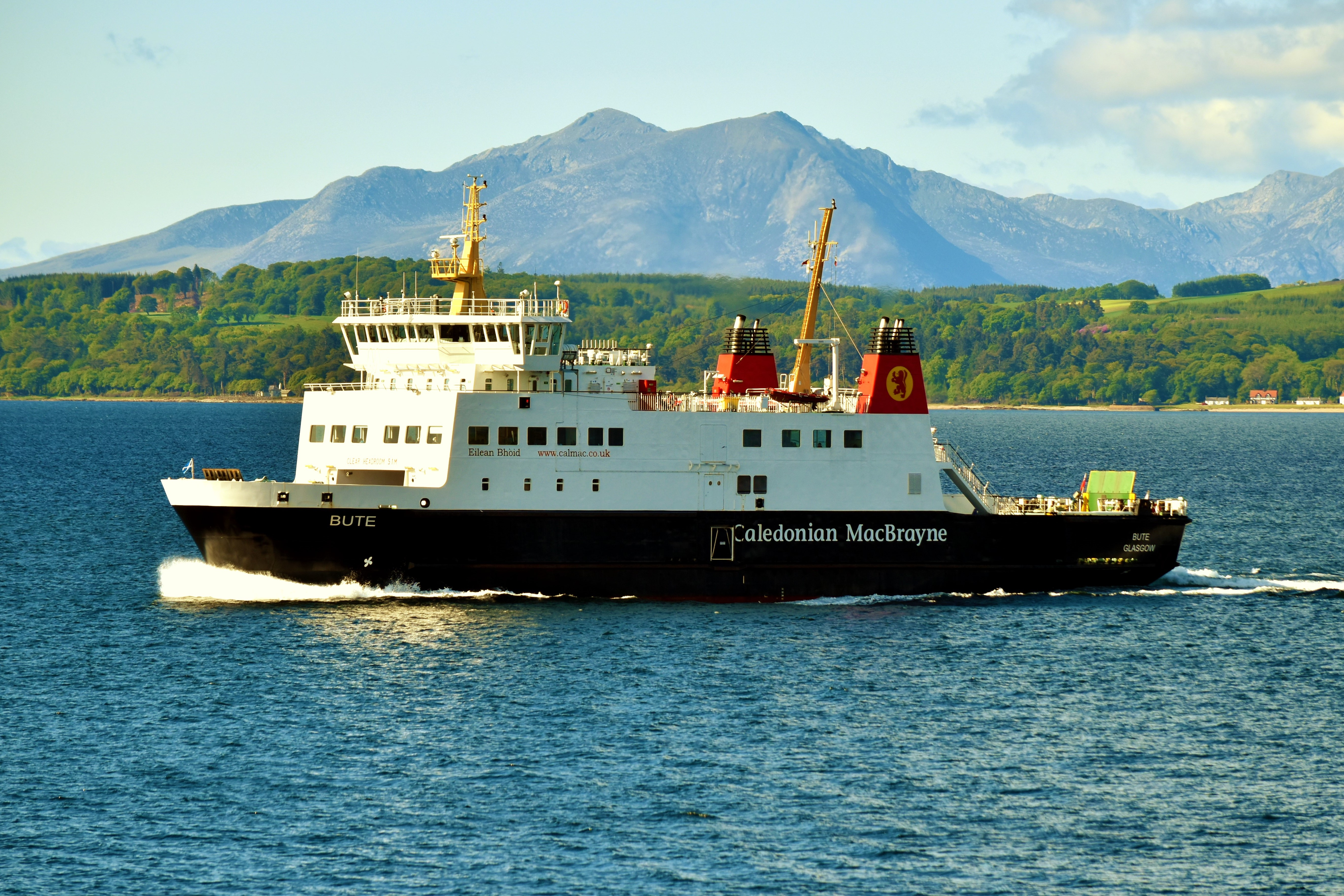
- Sailing from Rothesay to Wemyss Bay, May 2019.

History

United Kingdom
- Name: MV Bute; Scottish Gaelic: Eilean Bhòid
- Owner: Caledonian Maritime Assets Limited
- Operator: Caledonian MacBrayne
- Port of registry: Glasgow, United Kingdom
- Route: Wemyss Bay - Rothesay
- Ordered: 22 March 2004
- Builder: Remontowa (Gdańsk, Poland)
- Cost: £8,500,000
- Yard number: 1333
- Launched: 9 February 2005
- Christened: 1 July 2005; by Mrs Marjorie Bulloch
- Maiden voyage: 11 July 2005
- Identification: IMO number: 9319741; MMSI number: 235025112; Callsign: MHPD8
- Status: in service

General characteristics
- Class & type: Lloyds 100A1 RoRo passenger ferry with Class IV certificate
- Tonnage: 2,612 gt
- Length: 72 m (236 ft 3 in)
- Beam: 15.8 m (51 ft 10 in)
- Draft: 3.2 m (10 ft 6 in)
- Installed power: 2,660 kW (3,567 bhp) @1000 R.P.M. combined. 1,520 kW (2,038 bhp) from 8M20 and 1,140 kW (1,529 bhp) from 6M20.
- Propulsion: 1x MAK 8M20 + 1x MAK 6M20 Engines Burning M.G.O. Driving Schottel twin prop STP 12/12 and STP 10/10 through TwinDisc MCD slipping clutches.
- Speed: 14 knots (16 mph; 26 km/h)
- Capacity: 450 passengers, 50 cars
- Crew: 12

MV Bute (Scottish Gaelic: Eilean Bhòid) is a ferry operated by Caledonian MacBrayne, on the route between Wemyss Bay on the Scottish mainland and Rothesay on Bute ('Sea Road to Rothesay').

== History ==
She is the seventh Clyde ship to bear the name Bute and Calmac's first ferry built outside the UK since the MV Suilven in 1974. There was much dissent over the decision to order a new ferry from outside the UK. Launched in Poland, she sailed for Scotland, arriving in Gourock on 28 June 2005. After successful berthing trials, she entered service on 11 July.

== Layout ==
Bute has a semi-open car deck with a clearance height of 5.1 metres (16 feet 9 inches). Like the MV Coruisk before her, she has bow and stern access. In addition she has a starboard vehicle ramp aft, which was used at Rothesay before the pier was converted to allow end-loading.

Passenger accommodation is on two levels: the first housing forward and aft lounges with a kiosk area and toilets between, while the second level is open deck space from the twin funnels to just forward of the bridge. The bridge sits on its own perch above the open deck. A single lift connects the car deck with the lounge.

Bute has Azimuth thruster units with engine-driven propellers, by means of a cardan shaft, mounted on a steerable pod, protruding beneath the hull. These made her harder to position at piers than her predecessors with Voith Schneider Propellers and led to delays in the first season.

== Service ==
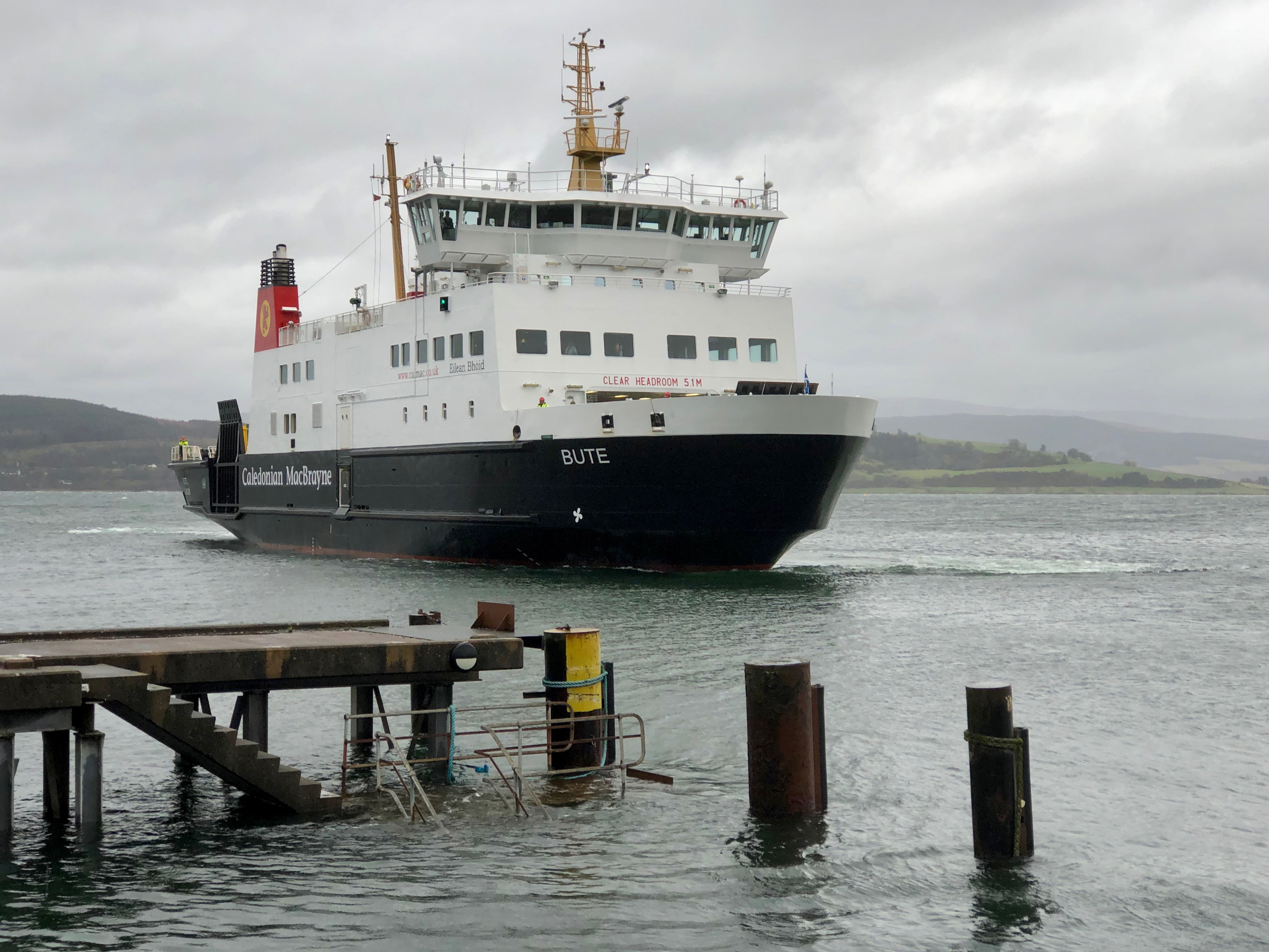
MV Bute diverted to Gourock pier during Storm Erik in 2019

Bute operates the route between Wemyss Bay and Rothesay on the Isle of Bute, along with her sister ship MV Argyle.

Being more manoeuvrable than the new vessels, the streakers MV Juno and MV Saturn returned to provide the service during work to build a new end-loading linkspan at Rothesay pier in 2007.

While works were being carried out at Wemyss Bay pier, Bute and Argyle were temporarily relocated to Gourock in October 2015, making each crossing an hour long. Services resumed from Wemyss Bay in March 2016 after a £6 million pier upgrade was completed.
