= MV Jupiter =

A number of motor vessels have been named Jupiter, including

- MV Jupiter (1952; IMO 5177456), cargo ship
- MV Jupiter (1961), a passenger ship which sank in 1988 after a collision
- MV Jupiter (1966), a cruise ship in service during 1966 and from 1986–90
- MV Jupiter (1969), a ferry in service 1969–92
- MV Jupiter (1973), a ferry in service 1990–94
- MV Jupiter (1974) (IMO 7341051), a Ro-ro ferry in service 1974–2011
- MV Jupiter (1974; IMO 7336575), cargo ship (Georgia)
- MV Jupiter (1975), a ferry in service 1975–81
- MV Jupiter I (1985; IMO 8416724), cargo ship
- MV Jupiter (1998; IMO 9187203), trawler
- MV Jupiter (2001; IMO 9226504), container ship
- MV Jupiter (2006), Panamax bulk carrier
- MV Jupiter (2007)
- MV Jupiter II (2009; IMO 9467897), bulk carrier
- MS Jupiter, a cruiseferry owned and operated by Vietnamese Jupiter Cruises
- MS Bulk Jupiter, a Bahamas-registered Norwegian-operated cargo ship that sank in 2015

== See also ==
- Jupiter (tugboat), a steamboat preserved in Philadelphia, Pennsylvania
- Jupiter (disambiguation)
