= Clyde steamer =

Passenger steamers on the River Clyde, Scotland

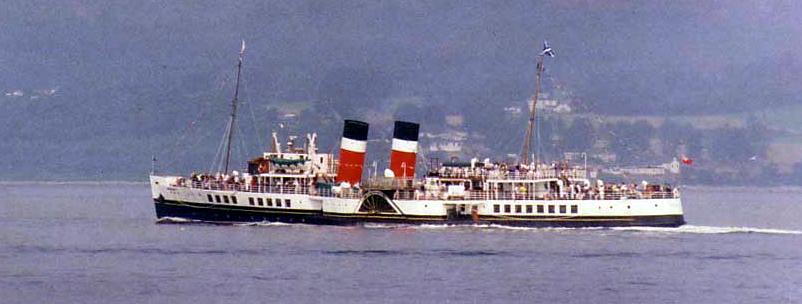
Paddle steamer Waverley steaming down the Firth of Clyde

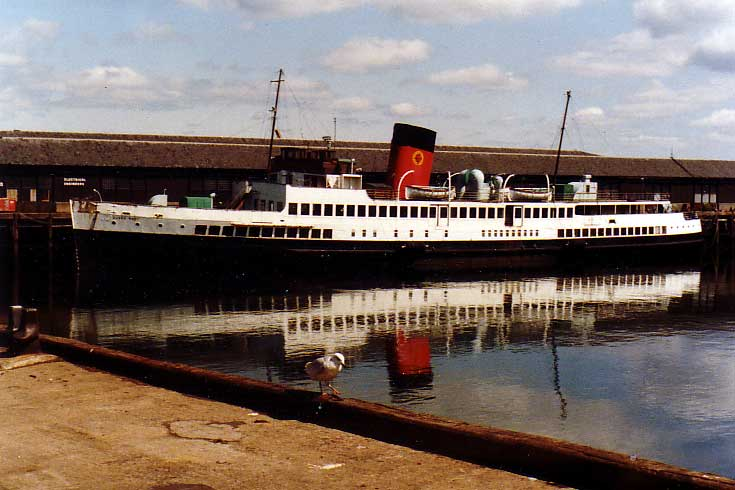
Turbine steamer Queen Mary laid up in Greenock

Clyde steamers were passenger services that existed on the River Clyde in Scotland, running from Glasgow downstream to Rothesay and other towns, a journey known as going doon the watter.

The era of the Clyde steamer began in August 1812 with the very first successful commercial steamboat service in Europe, when Henry Bell's Comet began a passenger service on the River Clyde between Glasgow and Greenock. The Comet undertook her official trial run on 6 August 1812. Henry Bell himself was on board, along with John Robertson, maker of Comet's engine, and William McKenzie, formerly a schoolmaster in Helensburgh, acting as skipper. According to the Glasgow Courier newspaper two days later, the journey was completed in three-and-a-half hours. After this success, other operators sprang up in competition, and the Firth of Clyde became immensely popular with holidaymakers. By 1900 there were over three hundred Clyde steamers operating, and the industry was still in full swing by the early 1960s. Then, competition from new forms of holiday travel brought the era almost to a close, but PS Waverley continues to provide excursions.

From the outset, steamboat services were aimed at holidaymakers, with a connection to Helensburgh bringing passengers to Bell's Baths Hotel. Within ten years, there were nearly fifty steamers on the Firth of Clyde, sailing as far as Largs, Campbeltown and Inveraray, and the Glasgow Magistrates had introduced a five-pound fine for services running late to prevent "the Masters of Steam Boats, from improper competition and rivalship, postponing their departure for considerable and uncertain periods, after the times they had previously intimated to the Public". Steamer services were also introduced onto the inland lochs, with the Marion appearing on Loch Lomond in 1816.

With the Industrial Revolution and rapid industrialisation and population growth of 19th-century Glasgow, great numbers were eager to be released from the grimy city on Fast Days, and during the annual Glasgow Fair week they went on a cruise down the Clyde to clean, unspoilt scenery. Tiny villages, perhaps with a stone jetty, soon became resorts with wooden piers and villas, hotels and public houses. Local residents would let out rooms, and boarding houses developed. Established towns like Dunoon and Rothesay, on the Isle of Bute, became major resorts. The wealthy built sandstone villas at places like Kilcreggan, Blairmore and Innellan, to which they could commute daily, or weekly, during the summer.

The first turbine-powered merchant vessel, the Clyde steamer TS King Edward, was built in 1901. Her successor, the TS Queen Mary of 1933, was a floating restaurant on the River Thames in London until 2009. She was rescued by the Friends of TS Queen Mary, and she is now undergoing restoration on the Clyde in preparation for a return to passenger service in summer 2024.

The PS Waverley, built in 1947, is the last sea-going paddle steamer in the world. This ship sails a full season of cruises every year from places around Britain, and has sailed across the English Channel for a visit to commemorate the 1940 sinking of her 1899-built predecessor at the Battle of Dunkirk. The 1900 steamer SS Sir Walter Scott still sails on Loch Katrine, while on Loch Lomond the PS Maid of the Loch is being restored.

== Vessels ==
- PS Comet (1812–1820)
- PS Hero (1858–1909)
- PS Iona II (1863–1864)
- PS Iona (1864–1936), the longest-serving Clyde steamer
- PS Chancellor (1864–1896)
- PS Gael (1867–1924)
- PS Columba (1879–1935)
- PS Waverley (1885–1921), built for Captain Robert Campbell for the Kilmun station, taken over by his sons P & A Campbell, operated in the Bristol Channel 1887 to 1917, ferry and minesweeper during World War I
- PS Waverley (1899–1940), the surviving Waverley's predecessor that carried passengers on the Clyde and was sunk while carrying evacuees from Dunkirk during World War II
- TS King Edward (1901–1952)
- PS Duchess of Montrose (1902–1917)
- PS Waverley (1907–1939), a Clyde-built paddle steamer (originally operating as the PS Barry before being renamed in 1926) that carried passengers on the Bristol Channel and was sunk during minesweeping duty in World War II
- PS Vale of Clyde (1907–1952)
- PS Eagle III (1910–1946)
- TS Queen Alexandra (1912–1958)
- TS King George V (1926–1974)
- TS Duchess of Montrose (1930–1964)
- PS Jeanie Deans (1931–1964)
- TS Duchess of Hamilton (1932–1970)
- TS Queen Mary (1933–1978)
- PS Caledonia (1934–1980)
- PS Waverley (1947–present), the last sea-going paddle steamer in the world
- PS Maid of the Loch (1953–1981)

== In popular literature and song ==
The journey down the Clyde to Rothesay is immortalised in the song "The Day we Went to Rothesay O".

Neil Munro celebrates a trip "doon the watter" on a Clyde steamer in his Erchie MacPherson story "A Quiet Day Off", first published in the Glasgow Evening News of 23 May 1908.
