= MV Glen Sannox (1957) =

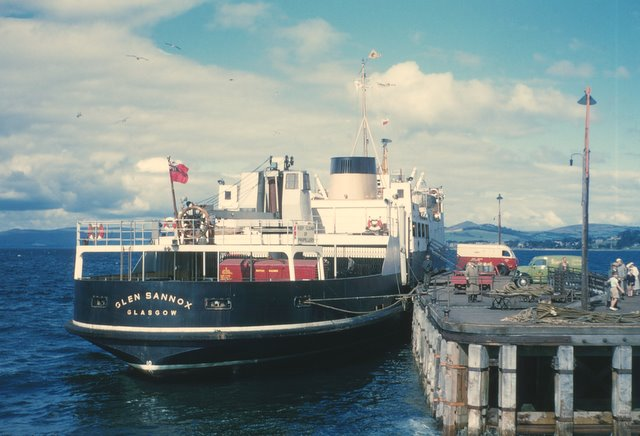

History

United Kingdom
- Name: Glen Sannox (1957–89)
- Namesake: Glen Sannox on Arran
- Owner: 1957–1973: Caledonian Steam Packet Company; 1973–1989: Caledonian MacBrayne
- Port of registry: Glasgow (1957-89)
- Route: 1957 – 1970: Ardrossan – Brodick; 1970 – 1989: various Clyde and West Highland routes
- Builder: Ailsa Shipbuilding Company, Troon
- Cost: £468,000
- Yard number: 496
- Launched: 30 April 1957
- Maiden voyage: 29 June 1957
- In service: 5 July 1957
- Out of service: 9 August 1989
- Identification: IMO number: 5131816
- Fate: Sold 1989

History

Red Sea Service
- Name: Knooz (1989–92); Nadia (1992); Al Marwah (1992–94); Al Basmalah 1 (1994–2000)
- Operator: 1989 Hellenic Alliance S.A., Panama.; 1991 Red Sea Cruises Lines S.A., Panama - International Maritime Centre S.A., Athens.; 1994 A. Abbar & A. Zainy, Saudi Arabia - Petrostar Group.
- Port of registry: Panama City (1989–2000)
- Route: 1989 – 2000: Red Sea
- Acquired: 24 July 1989
- Fate: Ran aground, 2000, subsequently scrapped
- Notes: 20.8805953049°N 39.3557390498°E

General characteristics
- Type: car ferry
- Tonnage: 1,269 GT 1,107 GRT 388 NT 301 DWT
- Length: 257 ft (78 m)
- Beam: 46 ft (14 m)
- Draft: 7.58 ft (2 m)
- Installed power: Engines: (i) Sulzer, Winterthur 2 Oil 2SCSA 8 cyl 420 x 500 mm, 2200 bhp each.; (ii) (1977) Wichmann, Norway 7-cyl 2-stroke turbo-charged 2,333 hp (1,740 kW) each at 415 rpm
- Speed: 16 knots (30 km/h)
- Capacity: 1100 passengers and 55 cars

MV Glen Sannox was a Clyde car ferry launched in 1957. Built for the Arran service, she spent her first 14 years there. Thereafter, she had a versatile career on the west coast of Scotland, lasting over 32 years, including providing cruises between 1977 and 1982. In 1989, she was sold for service on the Red Sea. She ran aground south of Jeddah and lay in a sunken condition from 2000.

== History ==
MV Glen Sannox was built for the Arran route, replacing the "A B C ferries", which were struggling to keep up with new demand. She bears the name of two of the most illustrious predecessors on that station.

Launched on 30 April 1957, she ran trials on 27 June 1957 and took a VIP cruise the following day. After her maiden voyage on 29 June 1957, Greenock Fair Saturday, she spent a few more days receiving finishing touches at Gourock and took up the Arran route on 5 July.

Her introduction allowed retirement of Kildonan (the glorified 1933 puffer, originally Arran and the last of the Clyde and Campbeltown Shipping Co. fleet), Marchioness of Graham (the 1936 turbine, built primarily for the Arran service) and the 1937 PS Jupiter.

In June 1964, she became the first unit of the fleet to receive the lion Emblem on her funnel which is now a well-recognized symbol of the modern fleet.

Glen Sannox was not fully roll-on/roll-off, it used a hoist to get vehicles down to the car deck. This meant that loading and unloading the ship could be a time-consuming procedure when it was in heavy use in the summer, which meant it would sometimes run late.

By 1969, when the Scottish Transport Group acquired the Caledonian Steam Packet Company, the Arran service was under serious pressure. Linkspans were installed at Ardrossan and Brodick in 1970 and Glen Sannox was replaced by MV Caledonia. Soon after she had a stern ramp added. At the 1971-72 refit, the crane was removed, longer side-ramps were fitted and a bow thruster replaced her bow-rudder.

Between October 1976 and March 1977, she underwent a further refit at Hall, Russell & Company, Aberdeen in preparation for a new cruising role. Two Norwegian-built, Wichmann diesel engines were installed, following favourable experience of these engines on the Norwegian built MV Suilven of 1974. Rated for a maximum of 2,333 horsepower (1,740 kW) each at 415 rpm, they were of 7-cylinder 2-stroke turbo-charged type, and physically much smaller than her original Sulzers. As the original engines had been direct-reversing type, a gearbox was also required. The passenger spaces were gutted, with the tearoom converted into the "Tartan Bar" and a "teabar" installed in the forward lounge. The original bar, below the car deck, became a self-service cafeteria. Much new seating was fitted, with extensive redecoration.

She served the company for over 32 years, and was superseded by full roll-on/roll-off ferries, the first of which on the Arran route was the MV Caledonia. In July 1989, she was sold to Arab interests, renamed Knooz and registered in Panama. She left the James Watt Dock for the last time on 9 August 1989. She was massively rebuilt at Perama, Greece for further service on the Red Sea Muslim pilgrim-trade. She had various names, Nadia, Al Marwah and Al Basmalah 1 and is believed to have run aground on a reef south of Jeddah, Saudi Arabia in 2000.

== Layout ==
Her appearance was strange in 1957, with forward superstructure and an open main deck at the stern with a 7-ton crane behind the hoist and side-ramps. The lift was required to get vehicles to the car deck. Below the car deck were a bar and crew cabins. On her upper deck were a combined tea-room and bar aft, seating sixty, with a lounge for 218, forward. The entrance hall, between lounge and tea-room, had the Caley lion emblazoned on the linoleum. There was open and semi-enclosed deck space on this upper deck and on the promenade deck, with an abundance of wooden sparred seats. The superstructure was topped by a tripod mainmast and a handsome, modern funnel.

Forward on the promenade deck, below the bridge, was a spacious observation lounge and the clubhouse containing officers' quarters. There was also an exclusive lounge for Arran landlords, the house of Montrose.

Glen Sannox was originally fitted with two Sulzer M diesel engines, built in Switzerland. Each was an 8-cylinder 2-stroke type of 2200 BHP at 360 rpm. She had a bow-rudder and a hydraulically powered hoist. The lift was very slow, especially when fully laden. During her life, a stern ramp was added to allow linkspan operation, the crane was removed and the side-ramps were remodelled as well as numerous changes of livery.

== Service ==
MV Glen Sannox was the main ferry on the Ardrossan - Brodick - Fairlie Arran route for several years. On introduction, she increased the service from two daily return trips to four, lying overnight at Brodick and using Ardrossan as the principal mainland port. On Saturdays, until 1964 she was assisted, for passengers, by the Ayr excursion steamer, PS Caledonia.

MV Caledonia took over the Arran service on 29 May 1970, and Glen Sannox moved to Wemyss Bay. After two years, she moved again, to use the new linkspan at Gourock, until the arrival of the new MV Jupiter in March 1974. She spent the 1974 season as the Oban - Craignure ferry, but was increasingly bothered with mechanical trouble, requiring a specially manufactured replacement piston. Back in the Clyde, she spent two years on contract between Wemyss Bay and the McAlpine oil-rig yard at Ardyne.

Destined for Clyde cruising, in place of TS Queen Mary, she underwent a massive refit in 1976/77, but introduction was delayed by service needs. While awaiting a new ferry, MV Saturn for Rothesay, Glen Sannox took up the Wemyss Bay roster and inaugurated new linkspans there in May and June 1977. She returned to Mull for the 1977-78 winter, proving very popular.

A varied programme of cruising was introduced in 1977:

- Sundays - full down-the-water sails from Glasgow to the Kyles of Bute; moving to Gourock
- Mondays - Tighnabruaich
- Tuesdays - Loch Goil
- Wednesdays - Arran
- Thursdays - Round Bute
- Fridays - Assorted outings
- Saturdays - service as a car ferry, usually at Rothesay, with a non-return positioning cruise to Glasgow

Changes were made in subsequent schedules, with Glasgow dropped in 1980. She continued to provide service at Brodick. Clyde cruising made a loss of £232,000 in 1980. Poor weather and competition from PS Waverley were blamed. For 1981, Glen Sannox offered a programme of short weekday afternoon excursions between Rothesay, Largs, Brodick and Tighnabruaich, fitted between morning and evening service as the Gourock-Dunoon ferry and Saturdays as Brodick or Rothesay relief. In June/July, she also took MV Columba's duties from Oban, when both MV Hebrides and MV Claymore were out of commission. CalMac abandoned Clyde cruising in 1982.

Glen Sannox appeared on many of the CalMac's Clyde and West Highland routes, but never sailed to any of the Outer Hebrides, or even to Skye. Never fitted with stabilisers, she could be lively in exposed conditions. She spent her final summers as Clyde spare, with winters at Oban. Despite speculation about redeployment to Oban, she remained essential on the Clyde, as the only suitable alternative to the elderly MV Clansman.
