= Duchess of Hamilton (disambiguation) =

Duchess of Hamilton is usually the spouse of the Duke of Hamilton.

Duchess of Hamilton may also refer to:

- LMS Princess Coronation Class 6229 Duchess of Hamilton, a preserved British steam locomotive
- TS Duchess of Hamilton, a Clyde passenger excursion steamer 1932–1974
