= MV Caledonia =

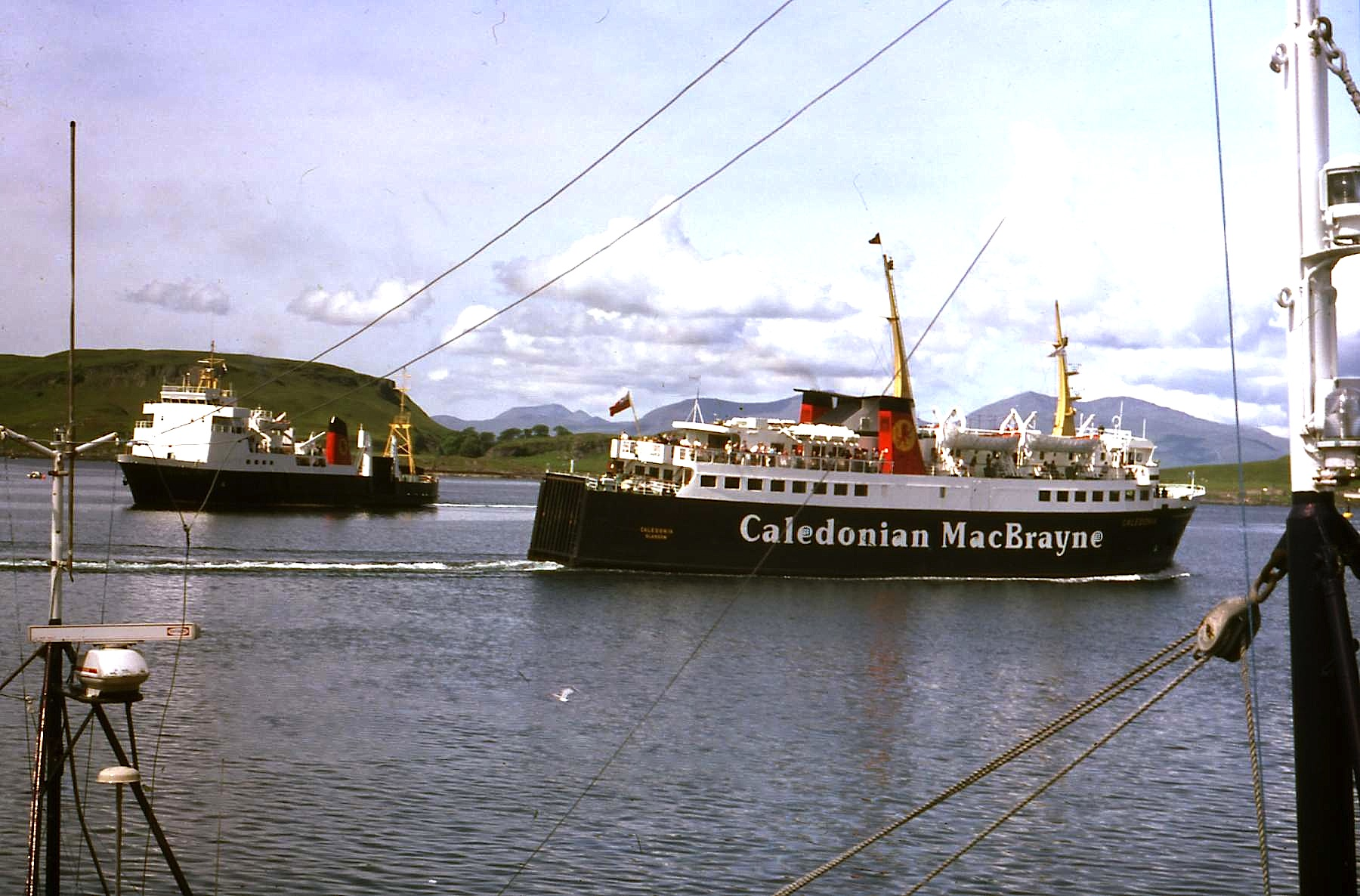
- Caledonia with Claymore in Oban harbour, 1985

History

United Kingdom
- Name: 1966 – 1970: Stena Baltica; 1970 – 1987: Caledonia; 1987 - End Of Life: Heidi
- Namesake: Roman name for Scotland; 1934 paddle steamer
- Operator: 1966 – 1970: Stena Line; 1970 – 1987: Caledonian MacBrayne
- Port of registry: Glasgow
- Route: Isle of Arran then Mull
- Builder: A/S Langesunds Mek Versted, Langesund, Norway; Engine Builders: Masch. Augsburg-Nurnberg, (M.A.N) Augsburg, West Germany
- Cost: £600,000
- Yard number: 53
- Completed: 1966
- Acquired: 1970
- Identification: IMO number: 6513451; MMSI Number: Callsign: IWUA (Heidi)
- Fate: Sunk 2005

General characteristics
- Tonnage: 1,157 GT
- Length: 58.22 m (191 ft 0 in) 61.78 m (202 ft 8 in) 12.58 m (41 ft 3 in) 3.16 m (10 ft 4 in)
- Beam: 12.22 m (40 ft 1 in)
- Draught: 3.47 m (11 ft 5 in)
- Installed power: 2x Oil 4SCSA 9 cyl. 300 x 450 mm
- Speed: 14 knots (service)
- Capacity: 650 passenger, 40 cars

MV Caledonia was a roll-on roll-off vehicle ferry operated by Caledonian MacBrayne in Scotland.

== History ==
Built as Stena Baltica in 1966, she operated on various Scandinavian routes.

In 1970, she was acquired by the Caledonian Steam Packet Company and rebuilt at Scott Lithgow in Greenock. Renamed Caledonia, she replaced MV Glen Sannox, on the Isle of Arran route, becoming the first roll-on roll-off ferry on this route. With its capacity of 40 cars and 650 passengers, she soon proved too small for the route (as well as criticisms of her abilities, being replaced by MV Clansman) and was moved to Oban, until April 1988, when she was replaced by the larger MV Isle of Mull.

Purchased for conversion to a floating restaurant, she was laid up in Dundee until December 1988, when she was sold for service in Italy, as Heidi. In 2005, she sank at her moorings in Naples, was re-floated and towed to Aliağa, Turkey for scrapping.
