= MV Maid of Ashton =

British ferry

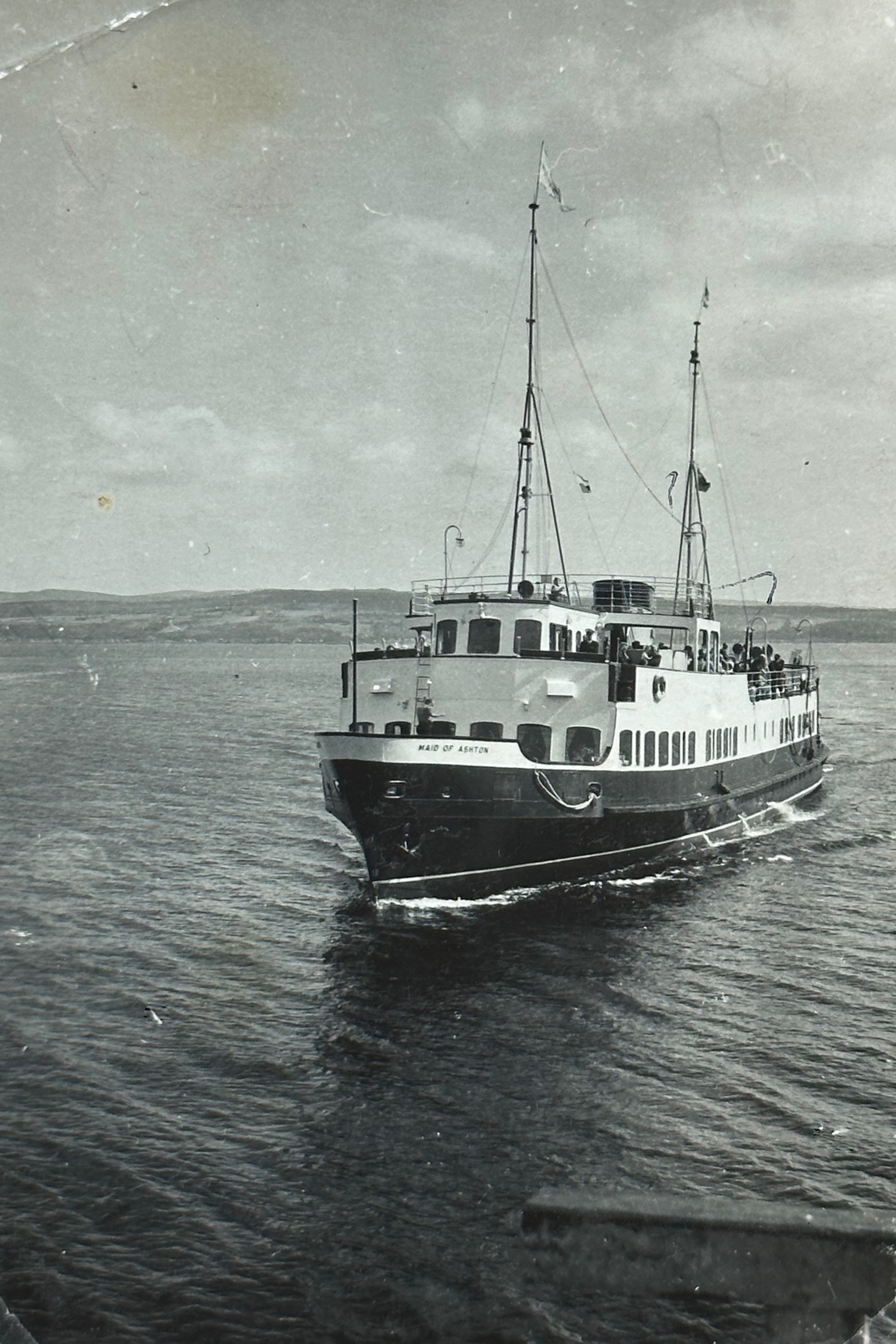
- MV Maid of Ashton approaching Blairmore, around 1960

History

United Kingdom
- Name: MV Maid of Ashton
- Operator: Caledonian Steam Packet Company
- Port of registry: Glasgow, United Kingdom
- Route: Gourock – Holy Loch service
- Builder: Yarrow & Co. Ltd, Scotstoun, Glasgow; Engine Builders: British Polar Engines
- Cost: £145,000
- Yard number: 2038
- Launched: 17 February 1953; by Lady Benstead
- In service: 25 May 1953
- Out of service: May 1971
- Fate: Floating Restaurant 1971-2020 Scrapped 2022

General characteristics
- Tonnage: 508 GT
- Length: 161.25 ft (49.15 m)
- Beam: 28 ft (8.5 m)
- Draught: 10 ft (3.0 m)
- Installed power: 2x Oil 2SCSA 6 cyl. 9 7/8" x 16 ½ "
- Propulsion: twin screws and rudders
- Speed: 15 knots
- Capacity: 624 passengers

MV Maid of Ashton was a passenger ferry operated by Caledonian Steam Packet Company, initially on the Holy Loch service. Rendered redundant by the car ferry revolution, she was sold for a new career as a floating restaurant on the Thames, under the name Hispaniola.

== History ==
Maid of Ashton was the first of a quartet of passenger vessels ordered in 1951 to modernise the Clyde fleet. She was the only Clyde passenger vessel ever built by Yarrow's naval yard at Scotstoun.

In May 1957, Princess Margaret took a cruise down river from Glasgow on Maid of Ashton.

With the switch to car ferry services, Maid of Ashton became redundant and was laid up in May 1971. In January 1973 she was sold to the Yardarm Club of London, as a floating club-house on the Thames Embankment. "Hispaniola", as she was renamed, was initially a private dining club, but later became a popular public restaurant. She was moved down river, to a berth close to an old Clyde consort, TS Queen Mary. In 2002, new owners, City Cruises had her refitted at the George Prior yard in Ipswich. She resumed business, under the shadow of the London Eye, with two decks of restaurant and function room facilities.

In 2020, due to financial constraints, the owners of the Hispanola restaurant announced that they had ceased trading and would be closing the facilities onboard. The vessel remained moored beside the Victoria Embankment until October 2022 when she was towed to Erith for scrapping. The former location where she was moored is now a work site for the Thames Tideaway Scheme.

== Layout ==
MV Maid of Ashton had a forward observation lounge and an aft tearoom, both with large windows. A lower deck lounge was later converted to a bar. Open deck space available for passengers was limited. The bridge was forward on the promenade deck, with a landing platform above, for use at very low tides. She had a single funnel, over the central engines, with the galley aft. A main mast was added after launch, to comply with new light regulations. She was the first Clyde passenger ship to enter service with radar.

== Service ==
MV Maid of Ashton operated the Holy Loch service from Gourock, with calls at Craigendoran, Kilcreggan, Blairmore, Kilmun and Hunters Quay. She was popular for her comfort and time-keeping superior to her predecessor, MV Marchioness of Lorne. In the late 1950s, the Maids lost their fixed routes and operated across the Clyde network.

== Gallery ==
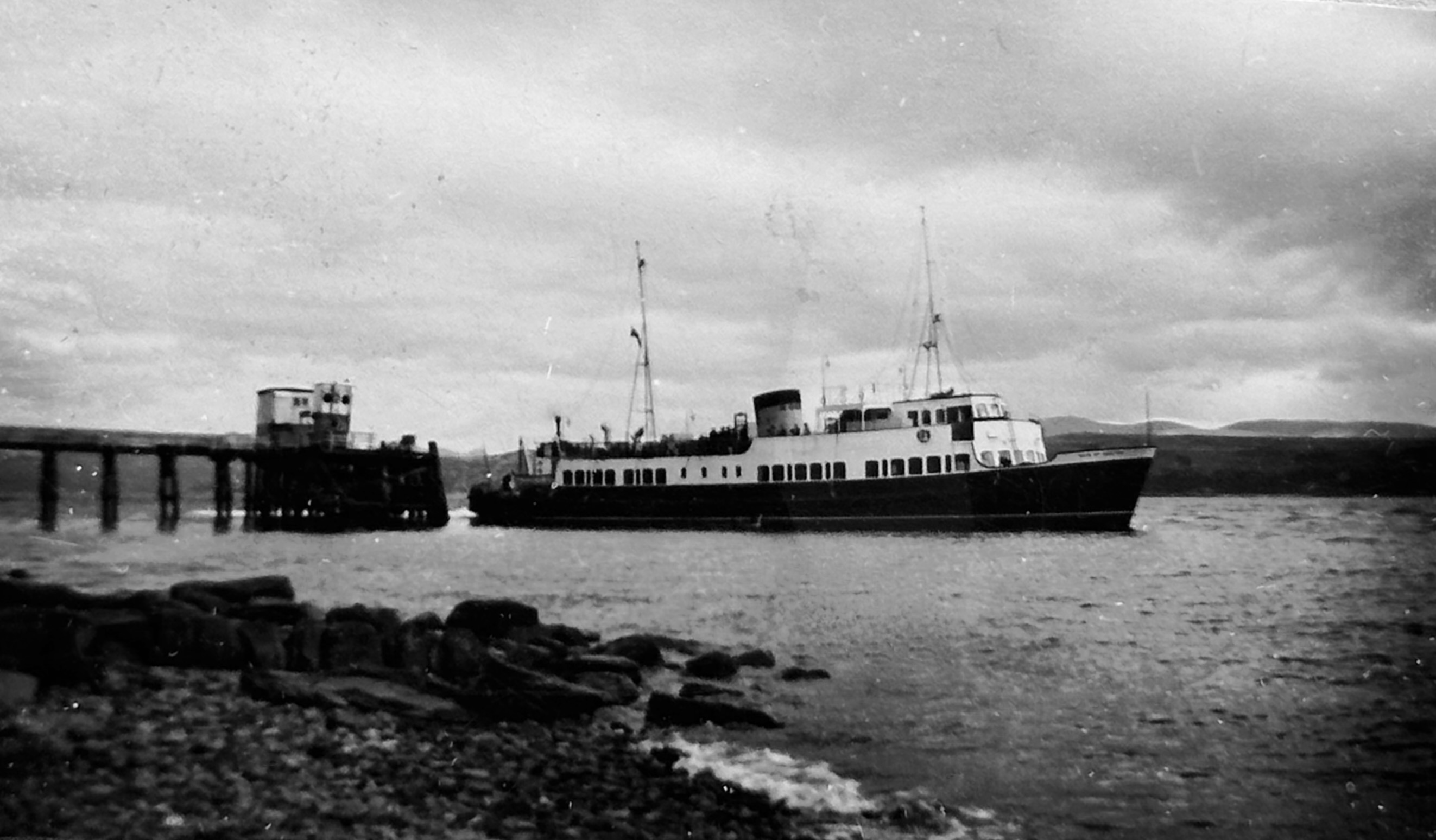
MV Maid of Ashton departing Blairmore pier

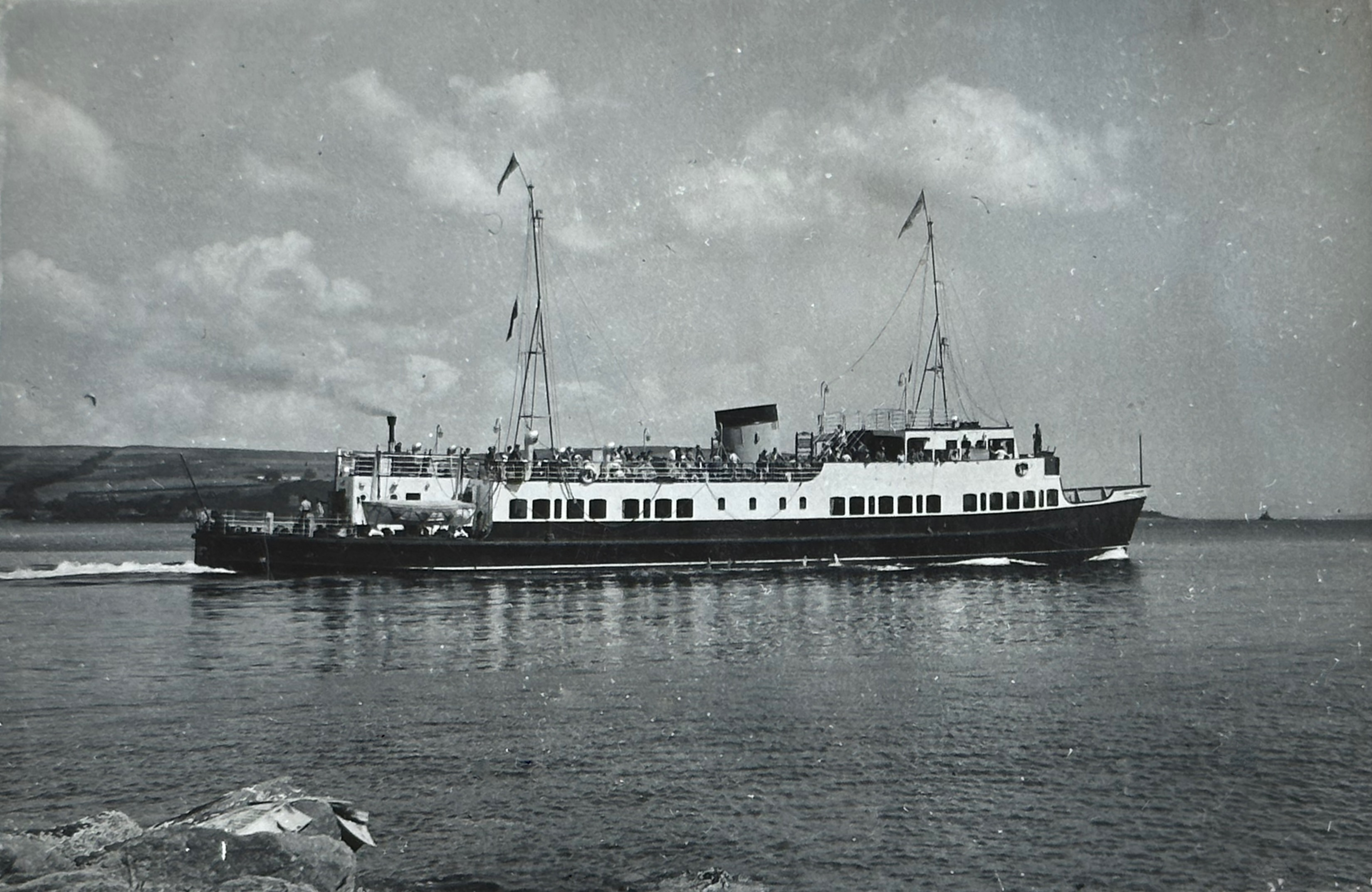
MV Maid of Ashton leaving Blairmore

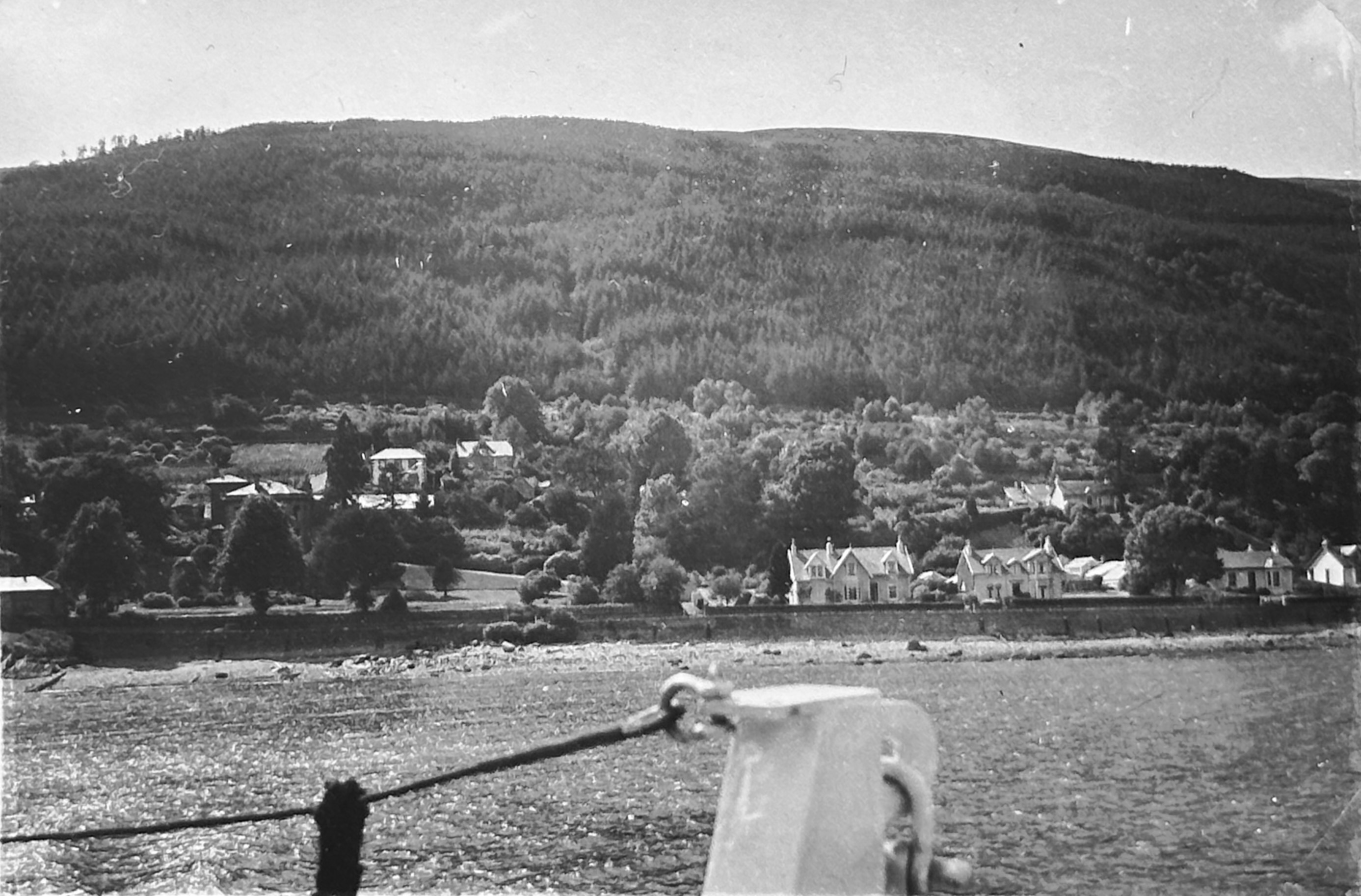
View of Blairmore from Maid of Ashton

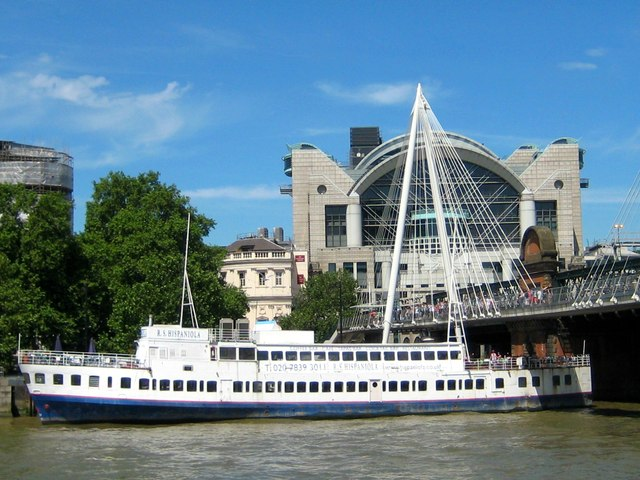
Hispaniola on the Thames in 2010

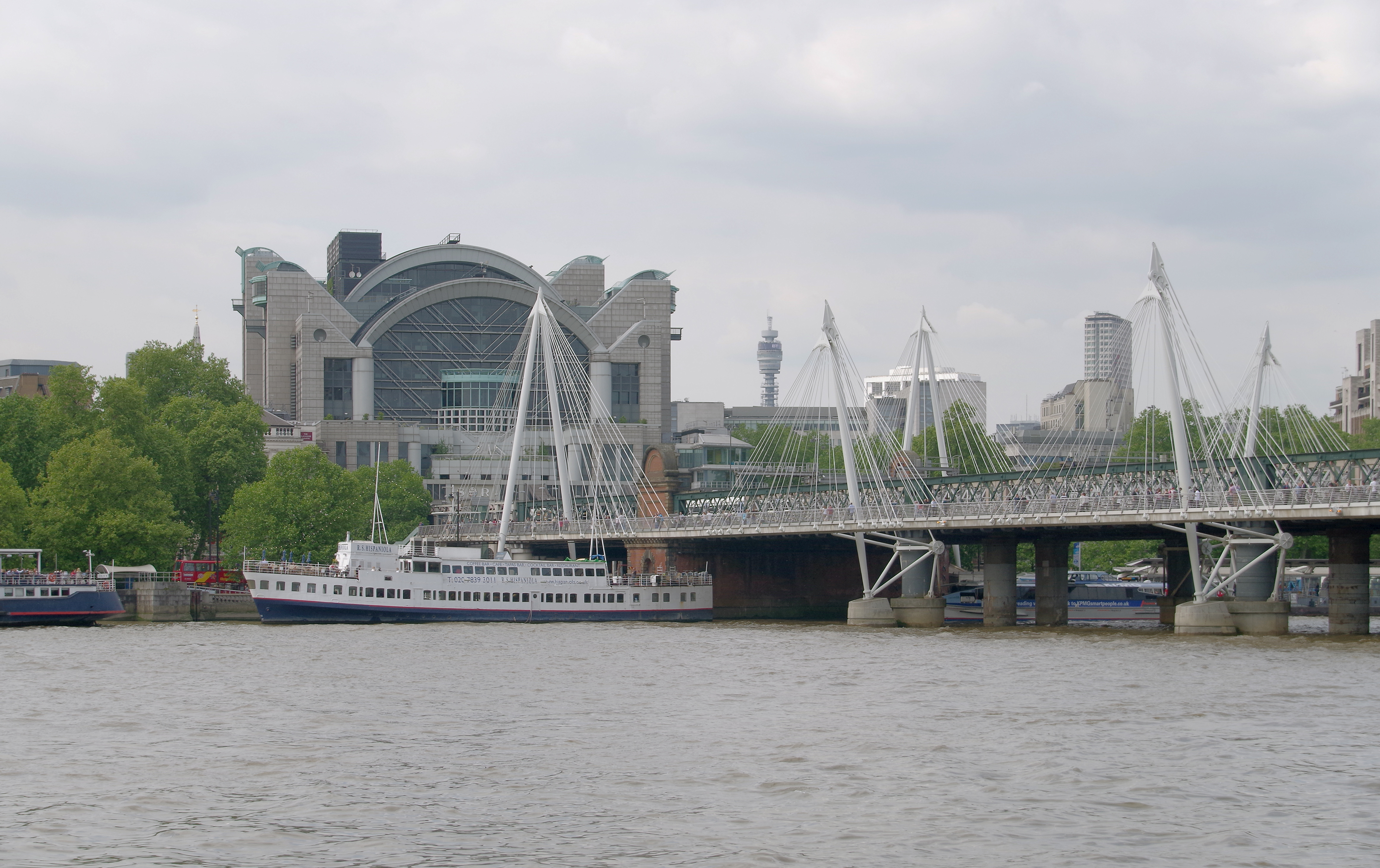
Hispaniola on the Thames in 2014

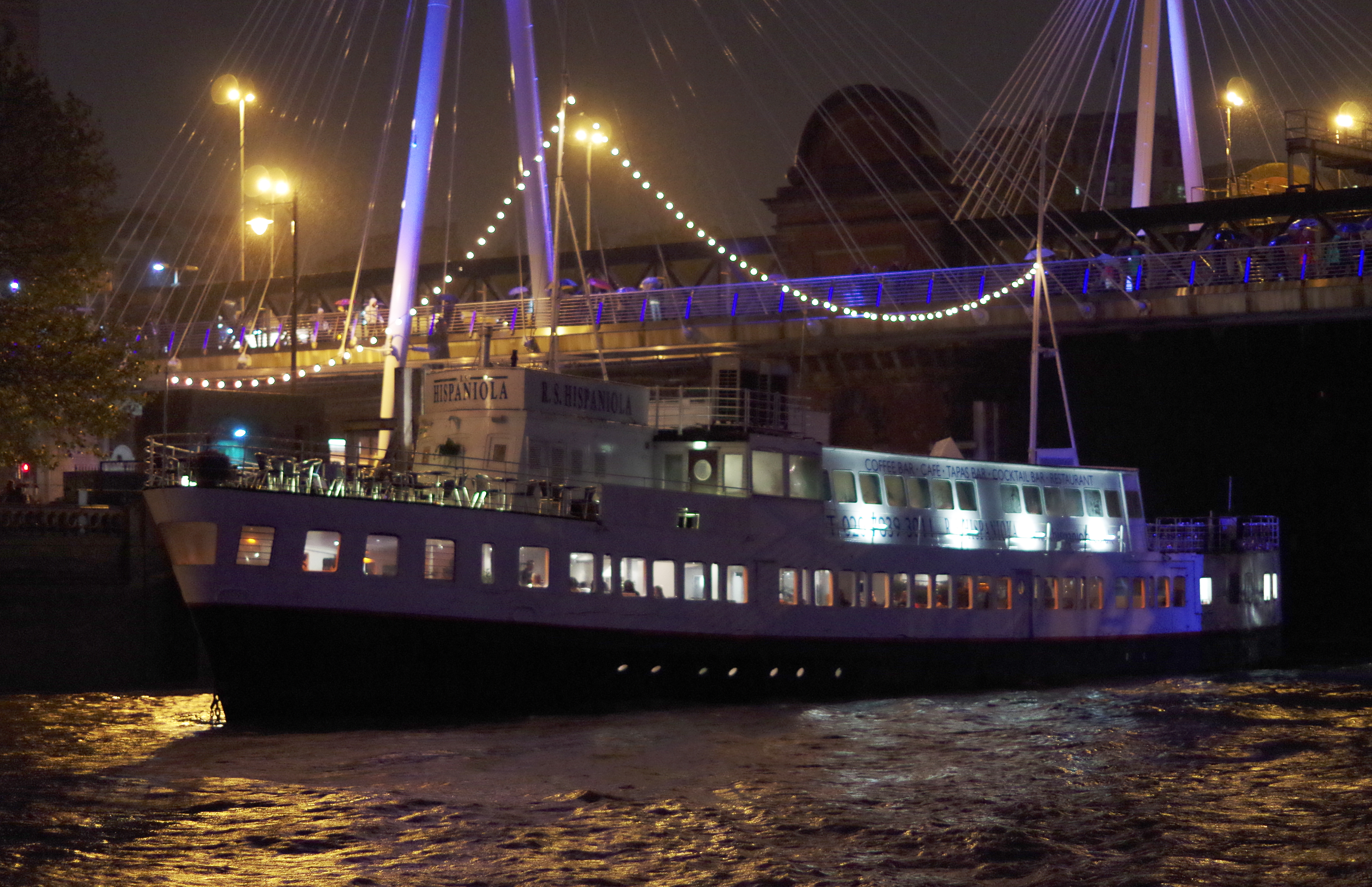
Hispaniola on the Thames, night scene
