= Napier and Miller =

Scottish shipbuilders in Glasgow, Scotland

Napier & Miller Ltd. (also Messrs Napier & Miller) were Scottish shipbuilders based at Old Kilpatrick, Glasgow, Scotland.

== Company history ==
The company was founded in 1898 at a yard at Yoker. In 1906 it moved to a new site a few miles downriver at Old Kilpatrick after its yard was acquired by the Clyde Navigation Trust to build a new dock (subsequently named Rothesay Dock). During World War I the company built sloops and minesweepers for the Royal Navy, along with merchant ships. It also assembled a number of Royal Aircraft Factory B.E.2 aircraft. In the 1920s the company built passenger ships and Great Lakes traders for United States, Canadian and Norwegian companies. The company also did contract work for other shipbuilders, for example being subcontracted by A. & J. Inglis to build the hull for the paddle steamer PS Eagle III for Buchanan Steamers. During the Great Depression the company went out of business, having built over 120 ships. The last ship was completed in 1930, and the yard was closed, sold, and demolished the following year.

== Ships ==
The company built two double-ended steam passenger ferries for the Port Jackson & Manly Steamship Company Limited in Sydney, Australia, launched in 1927 and 1928. They were named Dee Why and Curl Curl and were in service until 1968 and 1960 respectively. Their triple-expansion, four-cylinder reciprocating engines were built by D & W Henderson.
