= Hollycombe Steam Collection =

Steam-powered attractions in Hampshire, England

Coordinates: 51.0571°N 0.7813°W

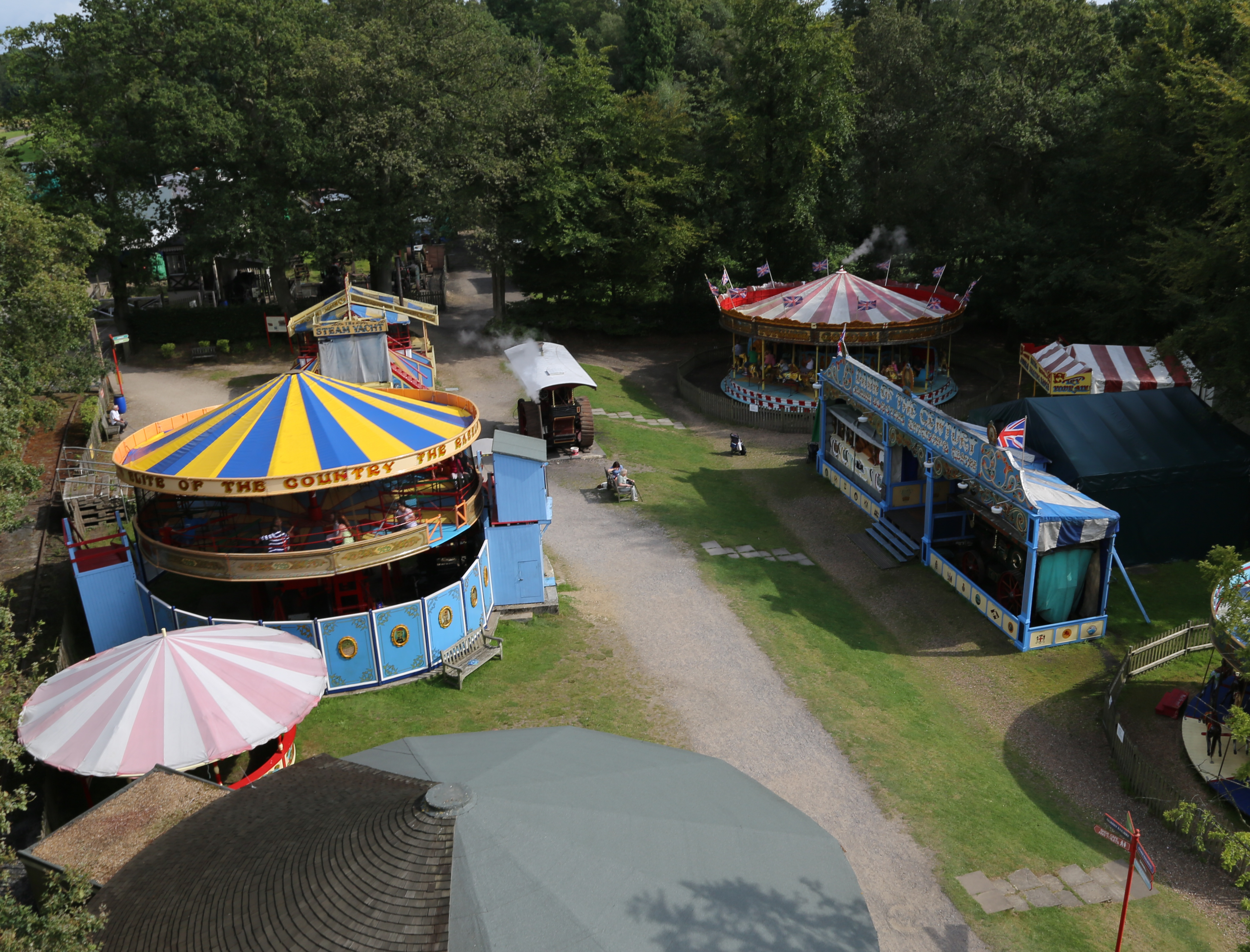
Part of the Fairground viewed from the top of the big wheel in 2012

The Hollycombe Steam Collection is a collection of steam-powered vehicles, amusement rides, and attractions in South East England. It is based in West Sussex, but the closest town is Liphook in Hampshire. The collection includes fairground rides, a display farm, two railways, and the woodland gardens.

== History ==
The collection dates to the late 1940s when Commander John Baldock decided to preserve some steam traction engines that were rapidly disappearing from British life. By the early 1960s, he had acquired a significant collection of road vehicles and began collecting fairground rides. In the late 1960s, he extended his interests again into preserving railway equipment.

Baldock's collection was opened to the public and became a major tourist attraction. Over time the collection grew so large it became impossible for one person to maintain, and by 1984 Baldock decided he would have to close the operation.

A society was formed by volunteers to operate the collection. This was successful and the collection continued to expand. The collection's bioscope was damaged in the Great storm of 1987 along with the roof of the then tea room. In the aftermath a Foden timber tractor was used to remove a number of the fallen trees.

At the beginning of 1999, a charitable trust took over most of the collection and its operation, funded by a Heritage Lottery Fund grant.

== Attractions ==
=== Edwardian Fairground ===
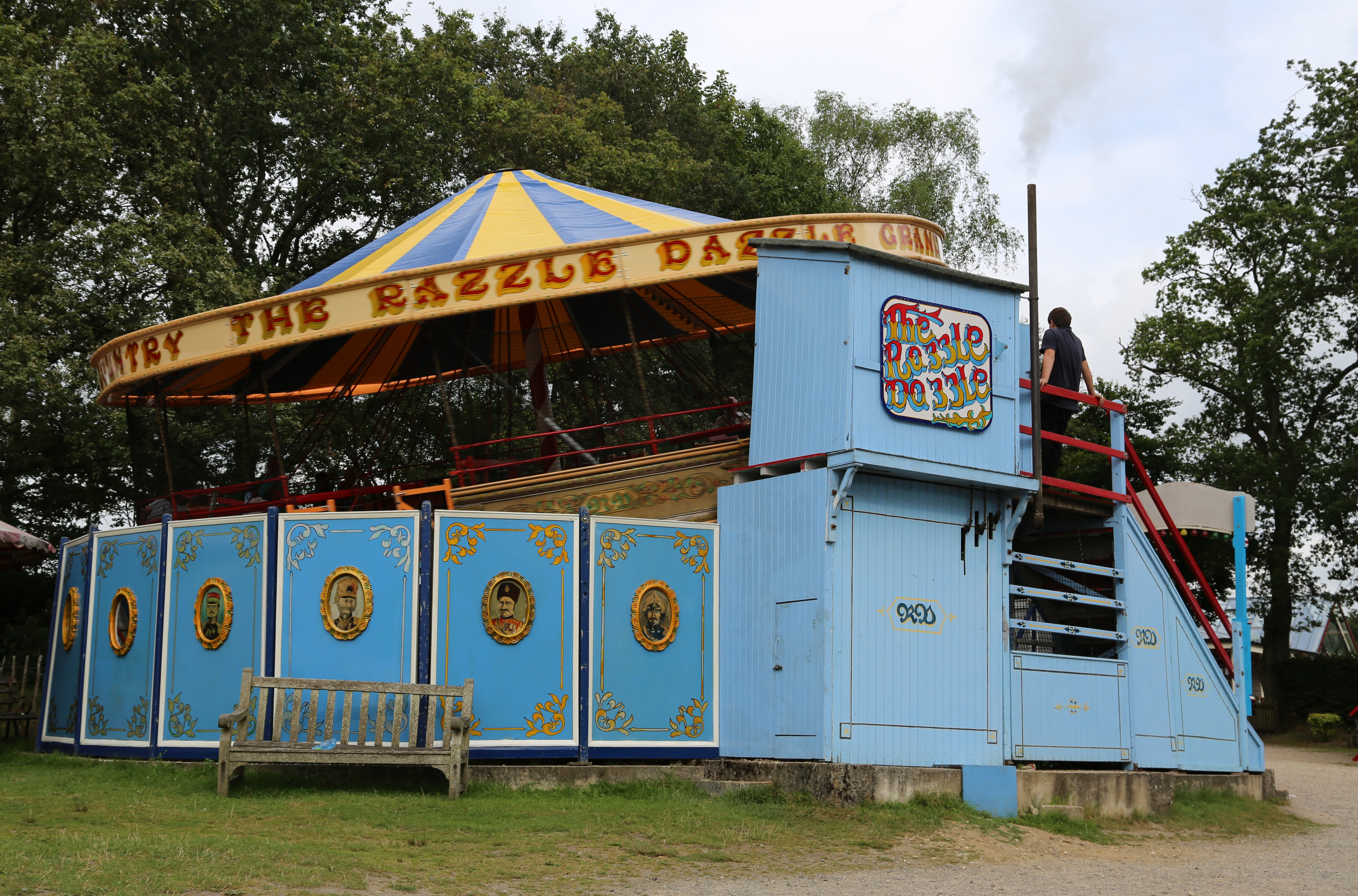
The Razzle Dazzle

The Edwardian Fairground offers an example of a steam fair comprising rides originating from the 1870s and later. Rides are built and operated on a seasonal rotation to allow the volunteers of Hollycombe Steam Collection opportunity to maintain and restore the collection. The rides include a Tidman three-abreast Golden Gallopers roundabout, a single steam yacht, and a razzle dazzle (a grand aerial novelty ride with a rotating and tilting movement). S. Fields Steam Circus was built between 1868 and 1872 and is the oldest surviving mechanically propelled fairground device. The fairground also has a set of steam swings, a set of Walker Chair-o-Planes, a big wheel, and a Bioscope show (an early travelling cinema). The rides are constructed mainly of wood and where appropriate are powered by steam engines. There are rides for all ages and the atmosphere is completed with a number of fairground organs and a range of side stalls.

=== Farm ===
The farm includes a wide range of vintage steam-powered farm equipment including ploughing engines, a threshing machine, a baler, and a stationary steam engine driving small machinery through a line shaft.

The sawmill is used to cut much of the wood used on-site and is powered by a large semi-portable Robey steam engine. Close by is the engine from the paddle steamer Caledonia.

=== Railways ===
There are two railways: narrow gauge and miniature. A third standard gauge line formerly operated but is now abandoned; further detail below.

=== Woodland Gardens ===
John Clarke Hawkshaw planted over a million trees on the Hollycombe estate from the 1880s, so it is a Victorian garden in origin. Planting continued into the 20th century and then, after a long pause before and after the war years, Clarke's son Oliver planted the one-quarter-mile-long (400 m) Azalea Walk in the mid-1920s, with the new Mollis hybrids from Knaphill. Baldock continued to manage and develop the gardens from the 1950s.

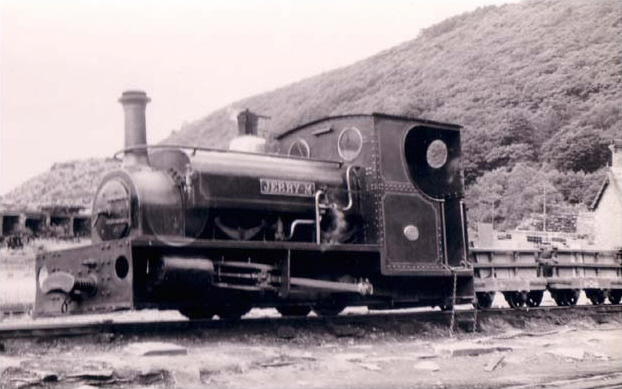
Jerry M running at Dinorwig before preservation at Hollycombe

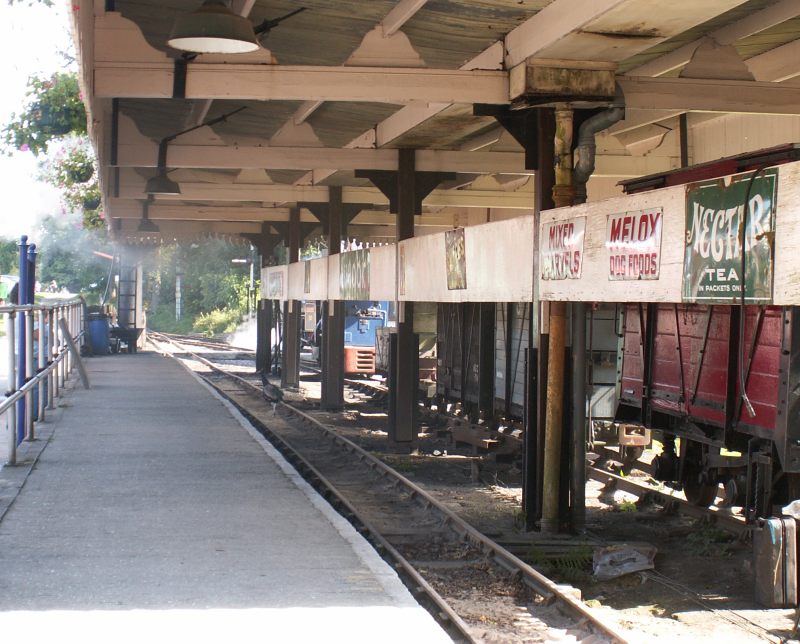
Narrow-gauge station at Hollycombe

== Miniature railway ==
The miniature railway at Hollycombe is 7 1/4 in (184 mm) gauge.

It starts at the station by the saw mill and climbs past crossing gates and through a cutting. It reaches the top and bends to the left. The fairground is then on the left and the woodland gardens is on the right. It then heads into another cutting before a 360-degree loop onto an embankment. It runs parallel with a five-inch gauge line into the two-platform station.

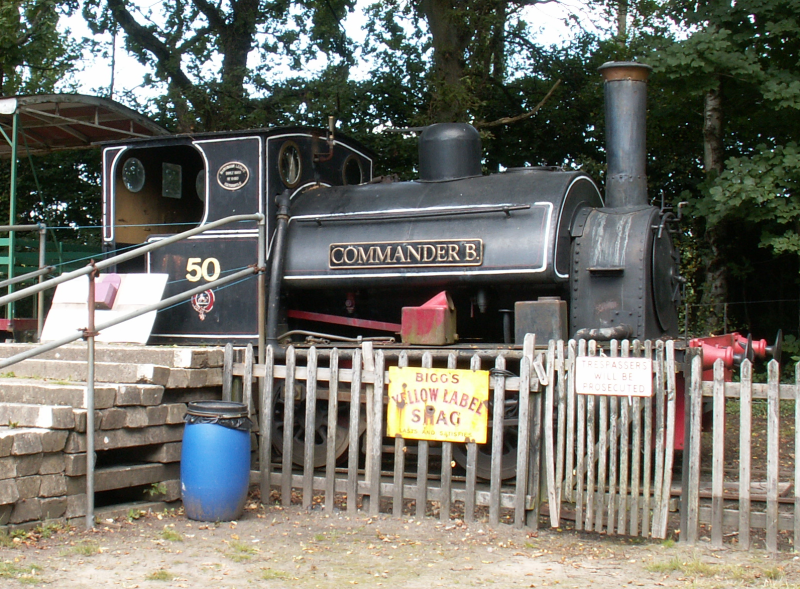
Hawthorn-Leslie 0-4-0ST Commander B

== Steam engines ==
The collection has over 30 different steam engines of various types.

== See also ==
- British narrow-gauge railways
- List of traction engine manufacturers
