= PS Eagle III =

Clyde-built paddle steamer (1910 - 1946)

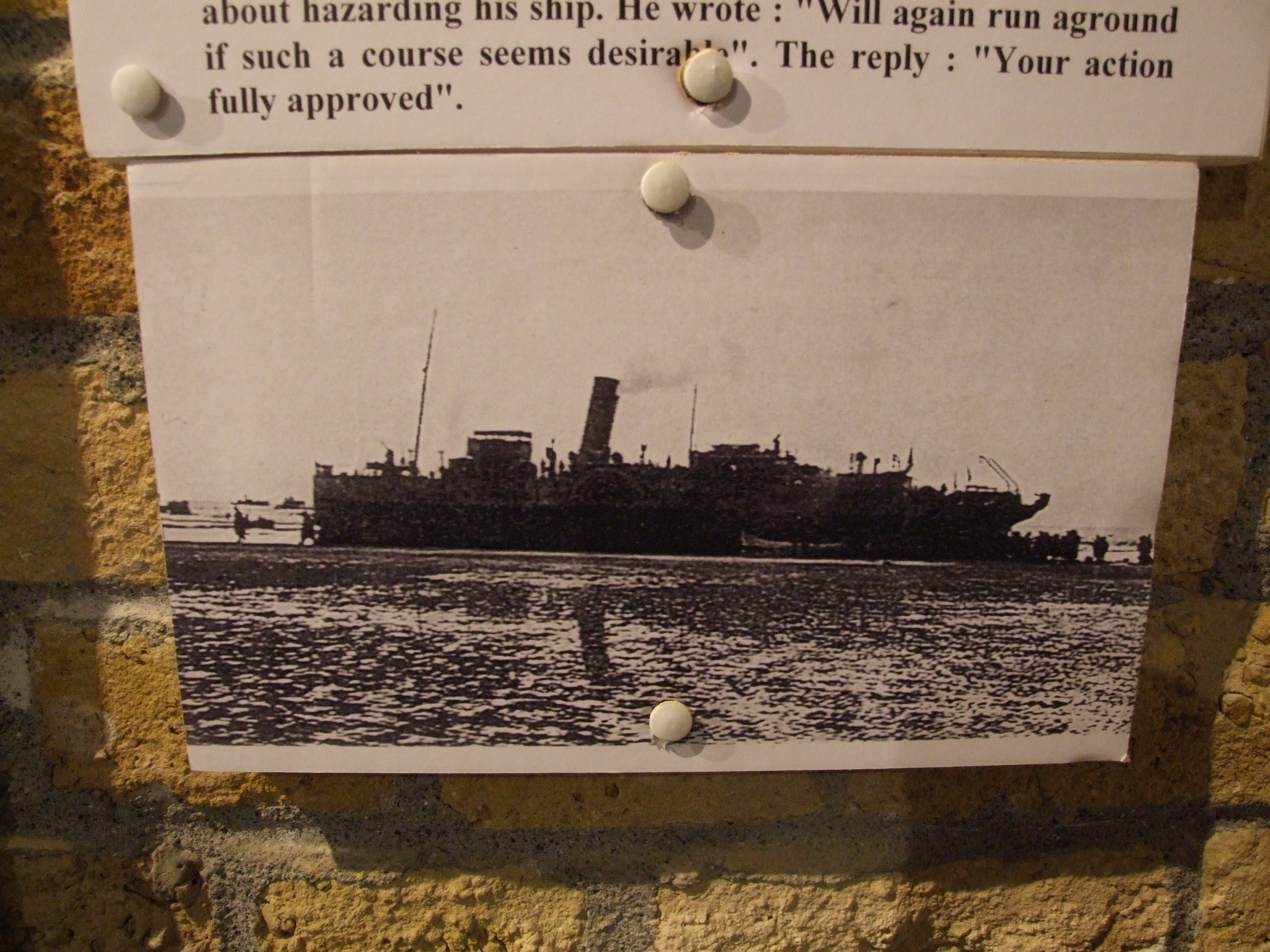
- A photograph which had been left at the Dunkirk war memorial of the beached HMS Oriole (PS Eagle III).

History

United Kingdom
- Name: PS Eagle III (1909–1939); HMS Oriole (1939–1946)
- Owner: Buchanan Steamers (1909-1919); Williamson-Buchanan Steamers (1919-1935); Caledonian Steam Packet Company (1935-1946)
- Operator: Buchanan Steamers (1909-1917); Royal Navy (1917-1919); Williamson-Buchanan Steamers (1919-1935); Caledonian Steam Packet Company (1935-1939); Royal Navy (1939-1945)
- Builder: A. & J. Inglis, Glasgow; Napier and Miller
- Launched: 14 April 1910
- Fate: Scrapped, 1946

General characteristics
- Type: Paddle steamer
- Speed: 16.5 knots

PS Eagle III was a passenger-carrying paddle steamer that was built and sailed on the Clyde, and was twice requisitioned by the Admiralty to serve as a minesweeper during the world wars.

In 1909, Buchanan Steamers ordered a passenger steamer from Glasgow shipbuilders A. & J. Inglis. While Inglis sub-contracted the construction of the hull to Napier and Miller, they built and installed the engine and boiler for the ship themselves. Her machinery was of a traditional design, with a Napier-type "haystack" boiler and the last simple diagonal engine to be fitted to a Clyde steamer.

She was launched on 14 April 1910 and entered service that summer, however on her first regular trip from Glasgow to Rothesay she listed heavily to port almost submerging the port paddle wheel and lifting the starboard wheel almost clear of the water. After repeating the same list on two or three subsequent journeys she was withdrawn from service, the design flaw was remedied by extensively re-building her hull bottom to give it a wider shape, and she was then returned to service in 1911.

Like other Clyde steamers, in 1917, she was requisitioned by the Admiralty to serve as a minesweeper during the First World War, based out of Grimsby. Before entering Naval service she was modified, with the most significant change being to bring her bridge forward in front of her funnel.

When Eagle III returned to the Clyde in 1919 her owners had merged with a competitor to form Williamson-Buchanan Steamers and she resumed regular sailings from Glasgow to Rothesay and Loch Striven. A decade and a half later, in 1935, Eagle and the rest of the Williamson-Buchanan fleet passed into the ownership of the Caledonian Steam Packet Company.

With the outbreak of the Second World War, in October 1939, she and other Clyde steamers like the PS Waverley were requisitioned again by the Admiralty for minesweeping duties. Renamed HMS Oriole to avoid confusion with the pre-existing ship called Eagle, she was modified again for war service with her main saloon being reduced in size to allow the installation of minesweeping gear at her stern, and an anti-aircraft gun being installed on her foredeck. In 1940 Oriole and the other active members of her minesweeper flotilla were ordered away from their regular duties patrolling the coast from their base at Harwich to take part in the Dunkirk evacuation. Arriving at La Panne beach, seeing the difficulty troops were having getting from the shallow beach to the ships, the captain of the Oriole Lieutenant E. L. Davies decided to beach the ship. This allowed the Oriole to act as a temporary pier speeding up the process of getting troops onto other ships and smaller boats. The Oriole stayed beached for ten hours open to attack from enemy positions on the beach and from the air, but left at dusk as the tide rose lifting her off the beach, returning to Harwich relatively unscathed. She made four more trips, and was finally credited with landing 2587 troops. In recognition of his actions, Lieutenant Davies was awarded the Distinguished Service Cross. In April 1941, she was transferred from Harwich to Kingston-upon-Hull. In 1945 when she was used to ferry food supplies to aid the Dutch famine.

After the war, Eagle returned to the Clyde but due to the cost of renovating her for a return to passenger service it was decided to scrap her and she was broken up in 1946 at the Smith & Houston yard in Port Glasgow.
