= PS Waverley (1899) =

Clyde-built paddle steamer (1899 - 1939)

History

United Kingdom
- Name: PS Waverley (1899–1940)
- Owner: North British Steam Packet Co. (1899–1902); North British Railway (1902–1923); London and North Eastern Railway (1923–1940
- Operator: North British Steam Packet Co. (1899–1902); North British Railway (1902–1915); Royal Navy (1915–1920); North British Railway (1920–1923); London and North Eastern Railway (1923–1939); Royal Navy (1939–1940)
- Ordered: 20 October 1898
- Builder: A. & J. Inglis, Glasgow
- Launched: 29 May 1899
- In service: 10 July 1899
- Fate: Bombed and sunk, 29 May 1940

General characteristics
- Type: Paddle steamer
- Tonnage: 537
- Length: 235 ft (72 m)
- Beam: 26 ft (7.9 m)
- Propulsion: Diagonal double expansion steam engine built by A. & J. Inglis, Glasgow
- Speed: 19.73 knots
- Capacity: 1,500 passengers

PS Waverley was a Clyde-built paddle steamer that carried passengers on the Clyde between 1899 and 1939. She was requisitioned by the Admiralty to serve as a minesweeper during World War I and again in World War II, and was sunk while participating in the Dunkirk evacuation in 1940. The current PS Waverley, launched in 1946, was built as a replacement for this vessel.

== History ==
Waverley was built for the North British Steam Packet Co. by A. & J. Inglis at their Pointhouse Shipyard on the Clyde in Glasgow, Scotland. The ship was designed to be the flagship of the North British Steam Packet Co. fleet with the intention that it could be used for regular Clyde services but also to help the company expand their initial foray into excursions in areas around Bute, Arran, Kintyre and Loch Fyne. Waverley was equipped with a compound engine, which was a first for ships employed on the Clyde which had up to this point only used single crank engines. But this was combined with a haystack boiler, which at the time was considered an older style of boiler, but being lighter than contemporary modern designs resulted in impressive speeds. She was launched on 29 May 1899 and completed official trials on 8 July during which she achieved 19.73 knots over the measured mile. After her trials she went downriver and around Bute before returning to Craigendoran. She entered service on 10 July 1899. In 1902, North British Steam Packet Co was dissolved and Waverley was transferred to the ownership of its parent company North British Railway operating a smaller range of routes that did not include Kintyre, Loch Fyne and the west of Arran.

=== World War I ===
Like many Clyde steamers, Waverley was requisitioned in 1915 by the Admiralty for service during World War I, being modified to increase her decked area and adding bow plating. For four years she served on the British and Belgian coasts and was discharged from service in April 1919.

=== Return to service ===
She spent over a year being renovated for her return to service, with the most obvious change being the repositioning of her bridge from its original location between her paddle boxes to a new location in front of her funnel. She was returned to her owners on 9 July 1920.

As the Railways Act 1921 took effect in 1923, Waverley was transferred again as North British Railway was merged into London and North Eastern Railway. In 1931 the Waverley was superseded as the fleet's flagship by the newly launched PS Jeanie Deans, but was renovated in 1923 with the addition of shelters on the promenade deck and remodeled interior passengers spaces to bring her up to the same standard as more modern steamers like the Jeanie Deans. By the late 1930s decreasing passenger numbers on the Clyde estuary resulted in other steamers being moved to service routes elsewhere, and the Waverley was removed from service in 1939.

=== World War II ===
With the outbreak of World War II she was brought briefly back into service to evacuate children from Glasgow to areas on the Clyde coast, and was then requisitioned by the Royal Navy to serve as the lead ship of the 12th Minesweeping Flotilla. The flotilla consisted of five paddle steamers, was based at Harwich on the east coast of England, and tasked with sweeping the shipping lanes. On 28 May 1940, this flotilla was given orders to stock up and sail south to take part in Operation Dynamo, the effort to evacuate Allied soldiers from the beaches of Dunkirk. Having spent several hours attempted to tow off the beached HMS Oriole (PS Eagle), Waverley was intercepted by 12 German Heinkels while returning to England with 600 troops on board. After avoiding their bombs for about 30 minutes, one struck the port side of the ship and opened a 6-foot hole in the bottom of the ship. The ship sank near Kwint Bank Buoy with the loss of two crewmembers and about 150 troops. 158 survivors were pulled from the water by the Cyclone, 285 by the PS Golden Eagle. A Dutch tugboat Java and two drifters picked up a few more.
