= TS Duchess of Montrose =

Clyde-built turbine steamer (1930-1965)

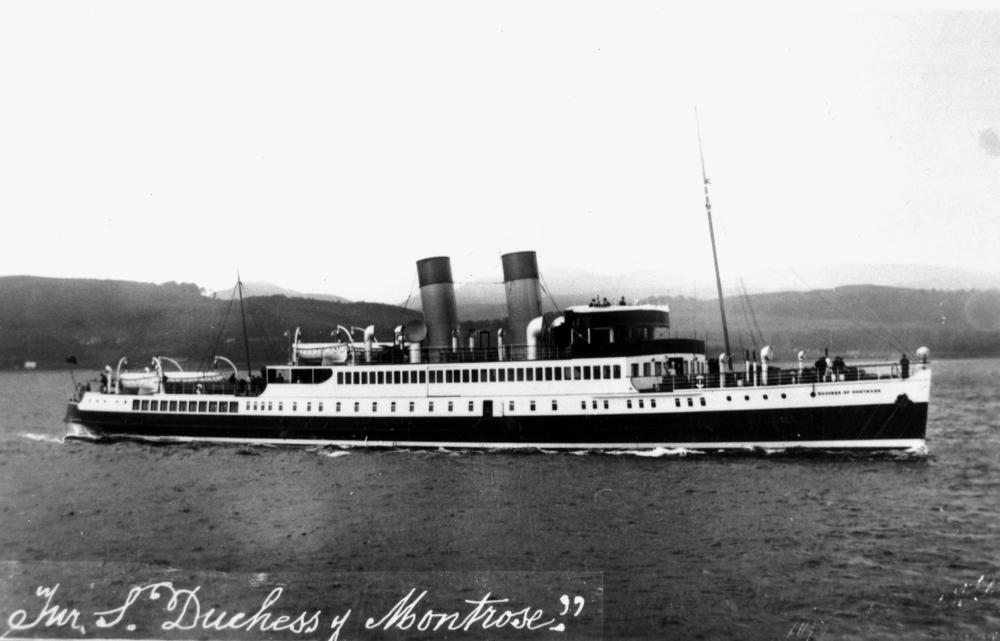
- TS Duchess of Montrose

History

United Kingdom
- Name: TS Duchess of Montrose
- Owner: Caledonian Steam Packet Company
- Builder: William Denny and Brothers, Dumbarton
- Yard number: 1245
- Launched: 10 May 1930
- In service: 1930
- Out of service: 1964
- Home port: Glasgow
- Fate: Scrapped in Ghent, 1965

General characteristics
- Type: Passenger turbine steamer
- Tonnage: 806 GRT; 314 NRT
- Length: 262 ft (80 m)
- Beam: 32 ft (9.8 m)
- Draft: 7 ft (2.1 m)
- Installed power: 3 turbines - converted to oil burning in 1956
- Speed: 18 kn (service); 20.7 kn (trial)

TS Duchess of Montrose was a Clyde passenger steamer, built in 1930 for the Caledonian Steam Packet Company. She was a popular boat, providing day cruises until 1964.

== History ==
TS Duchess of Montrose was built by William Denny and Brothers for the Caledonian Steam Packet Company in response to the growing competition from rival turbine steamers. She was the first one class vessel in the CSP fleet, carrying saloon class passengers only and proved popular with passengers. Her success led to her owners commissioning a sister ship, TS Duchess of Hamilton in 1932 for the important Ayr route.

Eventually superseded by diesel vessels, she was laid-up in Albert Harbour, Greenock from 31 August 1964 and scrapped the following year.

== Layout ==
Duchess of Montrose was similar in design to TS King George V with modifications based on experience. A double-ended, coal-fired Scotch boiler operated at a more traditional pressure (180 psi) than those trialled on the "King". The screws were driven directly, eliminating the gear equipment of the earlier vessel. She had a centre screw driven by the high-pressure turbine and two screws driven by the two low pressure turbines. The two low pressure turbines incorporated "astern turbines" for reversing.

Her single class made her spacious as facilities were not duplicated. She had an "Old English" style bar, a modern bright tea room and a large dining room with space for 100 diners at each sitting.

A wooden wheelhouse was added in 1948 and fully enclosed in 1951. New thicker funnels were added in 1952 and, like much of the fleet, she was converted to oil in 1956 and fitted with radar in 1960.

== Service ==
Duchess of Montrose sailed from her home berth at Gourock on a Round the Lochs cruise, via Ayr, Arran and Ailsa Craig. Towards the end of the decade, she operated CSP's newly acquired routes to Campbeltown and Inveraray, previously controlled by Turbine Steamers Ltd.

In 1940, she briefly served as a troop ship, but for most of the war, she maintained the Weymss Bay-Rothesay service and continued until 1948, when she returned to her peacetime role. In October 1946, she ran aground in fog at Kirn. The grounding was very gentle (most passengers did not realise what had happened) but the combined efforts of TS Duchess of Hamilton, TS King Edward and PS Marchioness of Lorne failed to pull her clear and she had to wait for tugs to pull her off.

She remained in service until August 1964, when the Clyde services were scaled down. She was laid up, did not return to service and was towed to Ghent, to be broken up the following year.

== See also ==
- List of ships built by William Denny and Brothers
