= PS Caledonia (1934) =

Clyde-built paddle steamer (1934 - 1980)

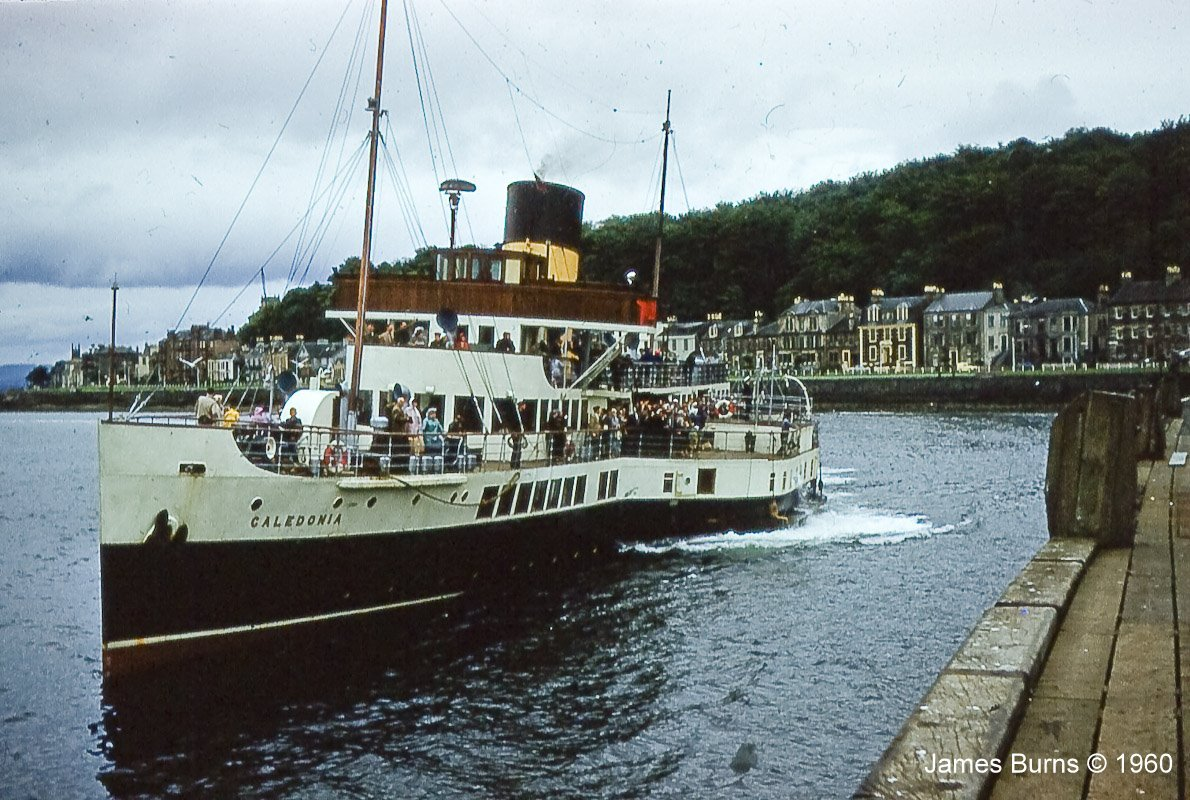
- Caledonia at Rothesay in 1960

History

United Kingdom
- Name: Caledonia
- Owner: London, Midland & Scottish Railway
- Operator: Caledonian Steam Packet Company
- Builder: William Denny and Brothers, Dumbarton
- Yard number: 1266
- Launched: 1 Feb 1934
- Completed: March 1934
- Out of service: 1939
- Home port: Glasgow
- Identification: 161981

History

United Kingdom
- Name: HMS Goatfell
- Commissioned: 1939
- Decommissioned: 1946
- Identification: J-125

History

United Kingdom
- Name: Caledonia
- Operator: Caledonian Steam Packet Company
- In service: 1946
- Out of service: 1969
- Fate: Used as floating restaurant; Damaged by fire and scrapped, July 1980

General characteristics
- Type: Paddle steamer
- Tonnage: 623 GRT; 161 DWT; 274 NRT
- Length: 70.1 m (230 ft 0 in)
- Beam: 18.9 m (62 ft 0 in)
- Draft: 2.3 m (7 ft 7 in)
- Installed power: Horizontal steam triple expansion 3cyl 1800 ihp
- Speed: 14 kn (26 km/h; 16 mph) (service); 17 kn (31 km/h; 20 mph) (max)

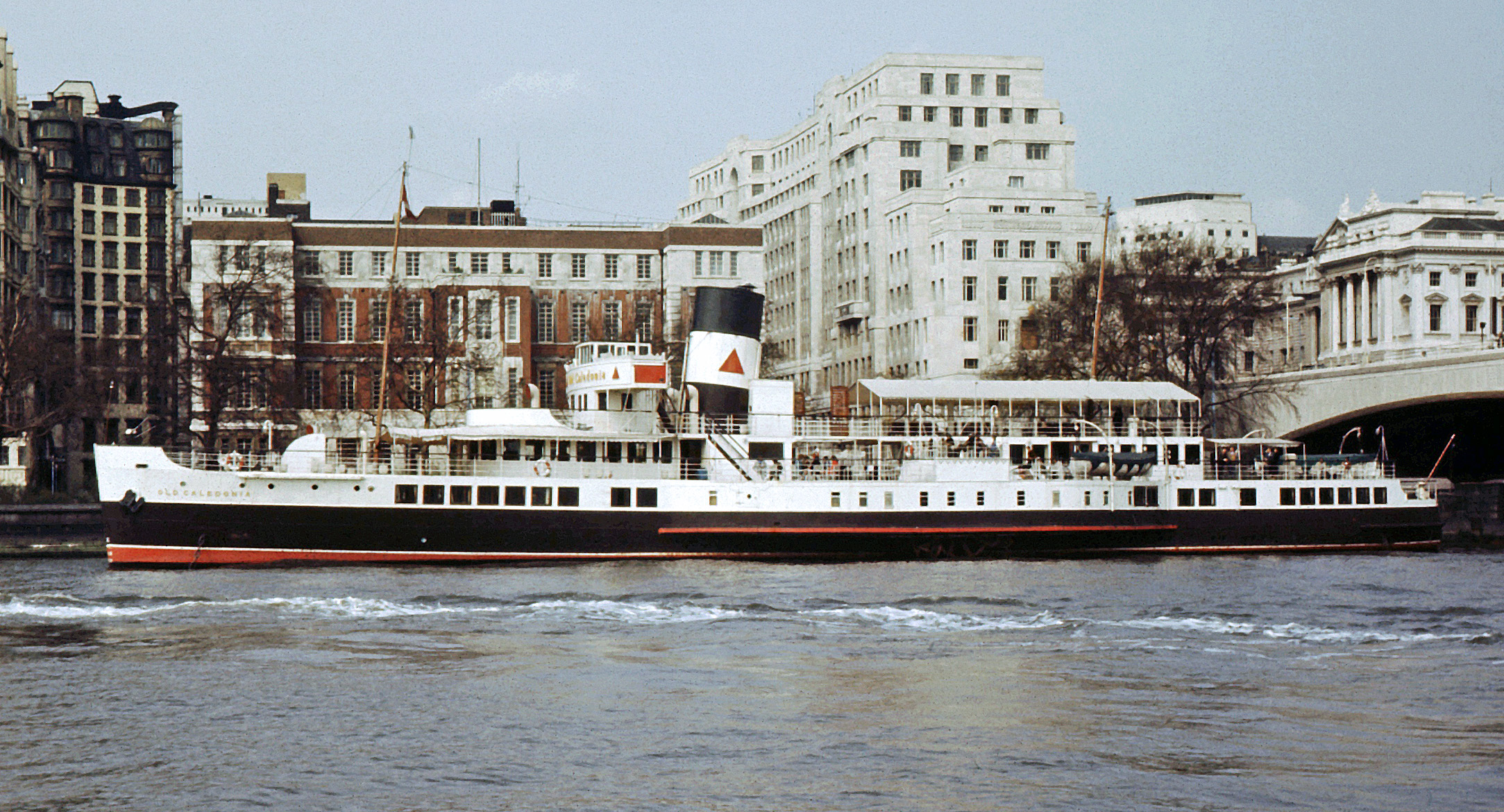
Restaurant ship Old Caledonia 1973 in London

PS Caledonia was a paddle steamer built in 1934. She principally provided an Upper Clyde ferry service, later moving to Ayr and then Craigendoran.

During the Second World War, she served in the Royal Navy as a minesweeper and then an auxiliary anti-aircraft ship under the name HMS Goatfell.

Her final days were as a floating pub in London until destroyed by fire in 1980.

== History ==
PS Caledonia was built by William Denny and Brothers of Dumbarton for the Caledonian Steam Packet Company. She was launched on 1 February 1934 and completed later that year.

== Layout ==
Built to look more like a screw turbine than a traditional paddle steamer, Caledonia and her sister Mercury had plating carried around the sponsons. They had promenade deck saloons fore and aft with observation decks above each, linked and extended forward of the forward saloon.

The navigation bridge was raised above the observation deck, forward of the single large elliptical funnel.

William Denny triple expansion three-crank engines gave a maximum speed of just over 17 knots.

In 1954 Caledonia was converted from coal burning to oil fuel.

== Service ==
Caledonia had a regular ferry programme connecting Gourock and Wemyss Bay with Dunoon and Rothesay. She also provided cruises to the Kyles of Bute and short cruises from Largs and Millport.

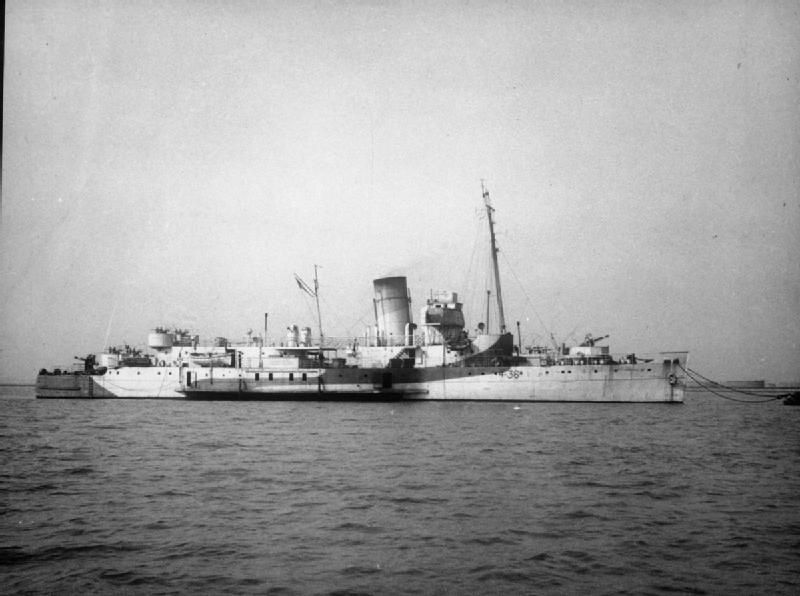
HMS Goatfell during World War II

In 1939 she was converted to a minesweeper and renamed HMS Goatfell. Her wartime service continued after 1941 as an anti aircraft ship.

In 1946 Caledonia was returned to her owners, but in 1954 the car ferry revolution displaced her to Ayr as excursion steamer, with relief sailings from Ardrossan to Arran. In 1965 she moved up-river to Craigendoran, to replace the withdrawn Jeanie Deans, cruising round Bute for a further five years, until the disastrous economics of Clyde cruising signalled the end.

In 1969 she was retired from service and sold for scrap. Saved by subsequent sale to Bass-Charrington, she served as a floating pub and restaurant named Old Caledonia on the Victoria Embankment of the River Thames. Badly damaged by fire in 1980, she was beyond economic repair and was scrapped in July 1980 at Milton Creek on The Swale near Sittingbourne, Kent. Her place in London was later taken by stable mate TS Queen Mary, until 2009. Caledonia's engines were saved and are preserved at the Hollycombe Steam Collection near Liphook, Hampshire.

== See also ==
- List of ships built by William Denny and Brothers
