= TS Duchess of Hamilton =

Decommissioned passenger steamboat based in Scotland

History

United Kingdom
- Name: TS Duchess of Hamilton
- Owner: Caledonian Steam Packet Company
- Builder: Harland & Wolff, Govan
- Cost: £60,000
- Yard number: 920G
- Launched: 5 May 1932
- Christened: by Her Grace The Duchess of Hamilton
- Completed: 24 June 1932
- In service: 1932
- Out of service: 1970
- Home port: Glasgow
- Fate: Scrapped 1974

General characteristics
- Type: Passenger turbine steamer
- Tonnage: 795 GRT; 314 NT
- Length: 262 ft (80 m)
- Beam: 32 ft (9.8 m)
- Draft: 10 ft (3.0 m)
- Installed power: 3 turbines
- Propulsion: Direct drive, triple screw
- Speed: 18 kn (service); 20.65 kn (trial)
- Capacity: 1918

TS Duchess of Hamilton was a Clyde passenger excursion steamer, built in 1932 for the Caledonian Steam Packet Company. She was a popular boat, providing day cruises from Ayr and remaining in service until 1970.

== History ==
TS Duchess of Hamilton was built by Harland & Wolff at Govan for the Caledonian Steam Packet Company following the success of her sister TS Duchess of Montrose. Built to replace PS Juno at Ayr, she was a one-class vessel, carrying saloon class passengers only and had a service speed of around 18 knots. She came under the control of British Railways in 1948, and in 1965 received new livery of a blue hull with red rampant lions on her funnels.

Superseded by diesel vessels, she gave her last voyage, to Campbeltown on 28 September 1970. Sold to the Reo-Stakis organisation as a night club/restaurant, she was moved to Ardrossan for modification, but the project failed and she was broken up, at Troon in 1974.

== Layout ==
Duchess of Hamilton was almost identical to her sister, TS Duchess of Montrose. Their single class made them spacious, as facilities were not duplicated. She had an "Old English" bar, a tearoom and two lounges – an observation lounge on the promenade deck and below that, a luxurious forward saloon. Aft on the main deck, there was a dining saloon.

Crosstrees were added to her mainmast in 1939. The wheel house was originally open but was enclosed in 1948. A cafeteria was installed in 1955 and the following year she was converted from coal to oil burning and was fitted with radar in 1960.

== Service ==
Duchess of Hamilton operated as an excursion steamer from Ayr, Troon and Ardrossan until 1939. During the Second World War she served as a troop carrier between Stranraer and Larne and she also tendered in the Clyde. After the war, she ran long distance excursions from Gourock to Campbeltown and later to Ayr, Arran and Inveraray as well.
