= TS Queen Mary =

Scottish riverine passenger ship

Coordinates: 51.4556°N 0.3600°E

History

United Kingdom
- Name: 1933–1935: TS Queen Mary; 1935–1976: TS Queen Mary II; 1976–: TS Queen Mary
- Owner: 1933–1935: Williamson-Buchanan Steamers Ltd; 1935–1936: Caledonian Steam Packet Company; 1936–1943: Williamson-Buchanan Steamers (1936) Ltd; 1943–1973: Caledonian Steam Packet Company; 1973–1978: Caledonian MacBrayne; 1978–1980: Glasgow District Council; 1980–1981: Euroyachts; 1981–1987: Tesright; 1987–2009: Bass plc; 2009–2011: Samuel Boudon; 2013–2015 : Ranjan Chowdhury; 2015– : TS Queen Mary Trust
- Operator: Owners
- Port of registry: Glasgow, (United Kingdom)
- Builder: William Denny and Brothers, Dumbarton
- Yard number: 1262
- Laid down: 9 December 1932
- Launched: 30 March 1933
- Out of service: 1978
- Identification: IMO number: 5287952; Callsign: MQPW
- Status: Under restoration to resume operating

General characteristics
- Tonnage: 1933–1950: 871 gross register tons (GRT); 1950–1957: 917 GRT; from 1957: 1,014 GRT
- Length: 252 ft 6 in (76.96 m)
- Beam: 35 ft 1 in (10.69 m)
- Draught: 10 ft 1 in (3.07 m)
- Decks: 5
- Installed power: 3,500 ihp (2,600 kW)
- Propulsion: 3 Parson Steam Turbines
- Speed: 21 kn (39 km/h)
- Capacity: 2,086

TS Queen Mary is a Clyde steamer launched in 1933 at the William Denny shipyard, Dumbarton, for Williamson-Buchanan Steamers. The ship is currently moored at Glasgow Science Centre, in Glasgow, where she is being restored to active service.

== Design and construction ==
TS Queen Mary originally measured 871 gross registered tons and was powered by three direct drive steam turbines built by Parsons Marine Steam Turbine Company. The vessel held a passenger certificate for 2,086 passengers, later reduced to 1,820.

Following the completion of her trials during which a maximum speed of 19.7 knots (36.5 km/h) was achieved on the Skelmorlie measured mile, she joined Williamson-Buchanan's fleet on 20 May 1933.

== Service history ==
Williamson-Buchanan based TS Queen Mary at Glasgow's Bridge Wharf, where she carried approximately 13,000 passengers each week.

TS Queen Mary sailed during the summer season for the Arran coast, or for the Kyles of Bute.

In 1935, Cunard Line asked Williamson-Buchanan to change the name of TS Queen Mary to TS Queen Mary II, in order to make the name available for their new flagship liner, which was due to be launched by Queen Mary. The owners of Williamson-Buchanan agreed and in exchange, Cunard Line presented them with a portrait of Her Majesty to hang in the forward lounge of the steamer.

In 1936, the entire Williamson-Buchanan fleet, including TS Queen Mary II, passed into the ownership of the London, Midland and Scottish Railway Company. Later that same year she joined Williamson-Buchanan Steamers (1936) Ltd.

During World War II the steamer provided a mail and passenger service to the Scottish Islands.

Queen Mary II was refitted and repainted in LMS colours after the war and returned to her normal passenger service. In 1948, nationalisation of the railways brought all the remaining passenger ships under the ownership of the Caledonian Steam Packet Company.

Over the winter of 1956-1957, Barclay Curle changed the fuelling of the propulsion system from coal to oil. This necessitated removing the two original Scotch boilers and replacing them with one new single ended boiler and the installation of a single funnel in place of the original two. In addition, a new mainmast was added so that TS Queen Mary II now had the requisite two required to meet the new regulations for ship lighting. After all of this work was completed, the vessel's tonnage increased to 1014 GRT.

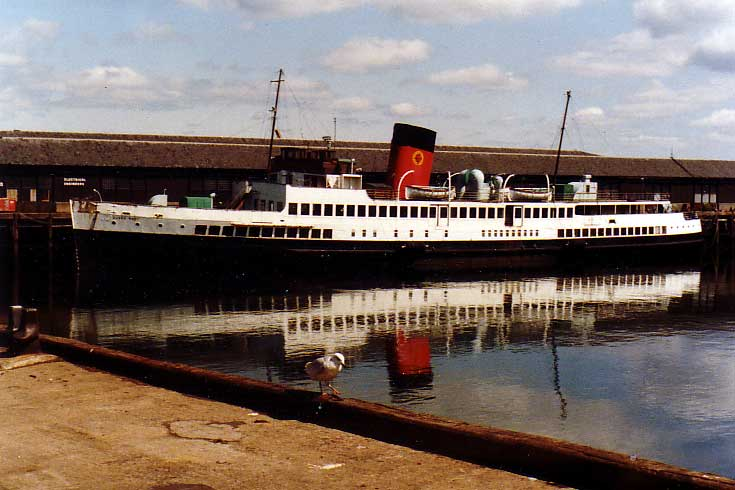
TS Queen Mary laid up at Greenock in 1981, still in Caledonian MacBrayne colours

In the 1960s, there was a decline in passenger sailings on the Firth of Clyde, but TS Queen Mary II continued in service and was refitted for cruises from Gourock to Inveraray, Brodick and Campbeltown. Regular sailings from Glasgow ended on 15 September 1969, with the Caledonian Steam Packet Company preferring to have her sail out of Gourock.

From 1969 onwards, TS Queen Mary II was placed on almost all of the cruise rosters, and she sailed regularly to Inveraray, Campbeltown, Ailsa Craig, Bute and to Stranraer. However, in order that she could continue to undertake sailings from Bridge Wharf, the masts were shortened to fit under the newly constructed Kingston Bridge although subsequently Bridge Wharf closed prior to the bridge opening.

The Caledonian Steam Packet Company gradually had been merging with the West Highland ferry company David MacBrayne, and in 1973, the company became Caledonian MacBrayne.

In 1976, following the removal of RMS Queen Mary from Lloyd's Register in a special ceremony on 4 May, TS Queen Mary II was once again formally registered as TS Queen Mary.

Whilst TS Queen Mary remained very popular in the charter market, nonetheless the vessel was over 40 years old and it was becoming apparent that some major work would be required to keep her in service. The decision was taken to retire the vessel from service and on 27 September 1977, TS Queen Mary undertook one final public sailing, before being laid up in the East India Harbour, Greenock.

== Retirement (1977–2009) ==
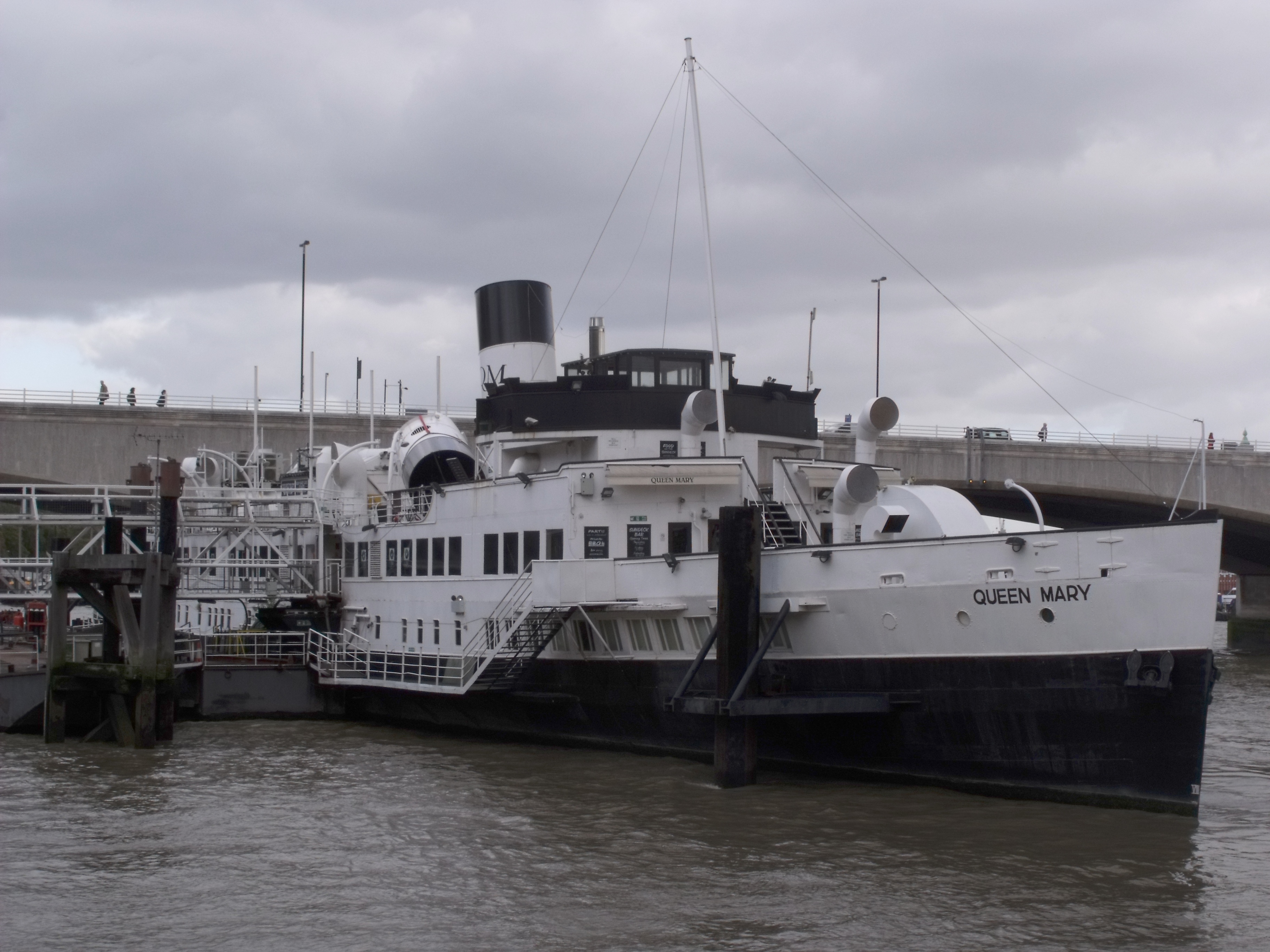
Queen Mary moored on the Victoria Embankment on 16 October 2009

In 1978, TS Queen Mary was sold to Glasgow District Council, which planned to convert her to a museum. The Council, however, was unable to commit the necessary funding and was sold to Euroyachts (1980). In 1981 TS Queen Mary again was sold, this time to Tesright Limited.

Tesright decided to relocate the ship to London, and Queen Mary departed under the tow of the tug Pellmell Delta on 29 January 1981, arriving in London four days later.

In 1987, Queen Mary was resold to Bass PLC. A £2.5M refurbishment was carried out in the vessel and was now moored at Victoria Embankment. Facilities included two bars and two function rooms, whilst the top deck of the ship was used as an open-air venue with bar facilities.

In November 2009, TS Queen Mary was towed to Tilbury, to be prepared for a new role at La Rochelle. She had been purchased by Samuel Boudon, who planned to renovate her as a floating restaurant and fitness centre. However, by 2011, the venture had fallen through and the steamer remained moored in Tilbury Docks, with an uncertain future

== 2009 – 2015 ==
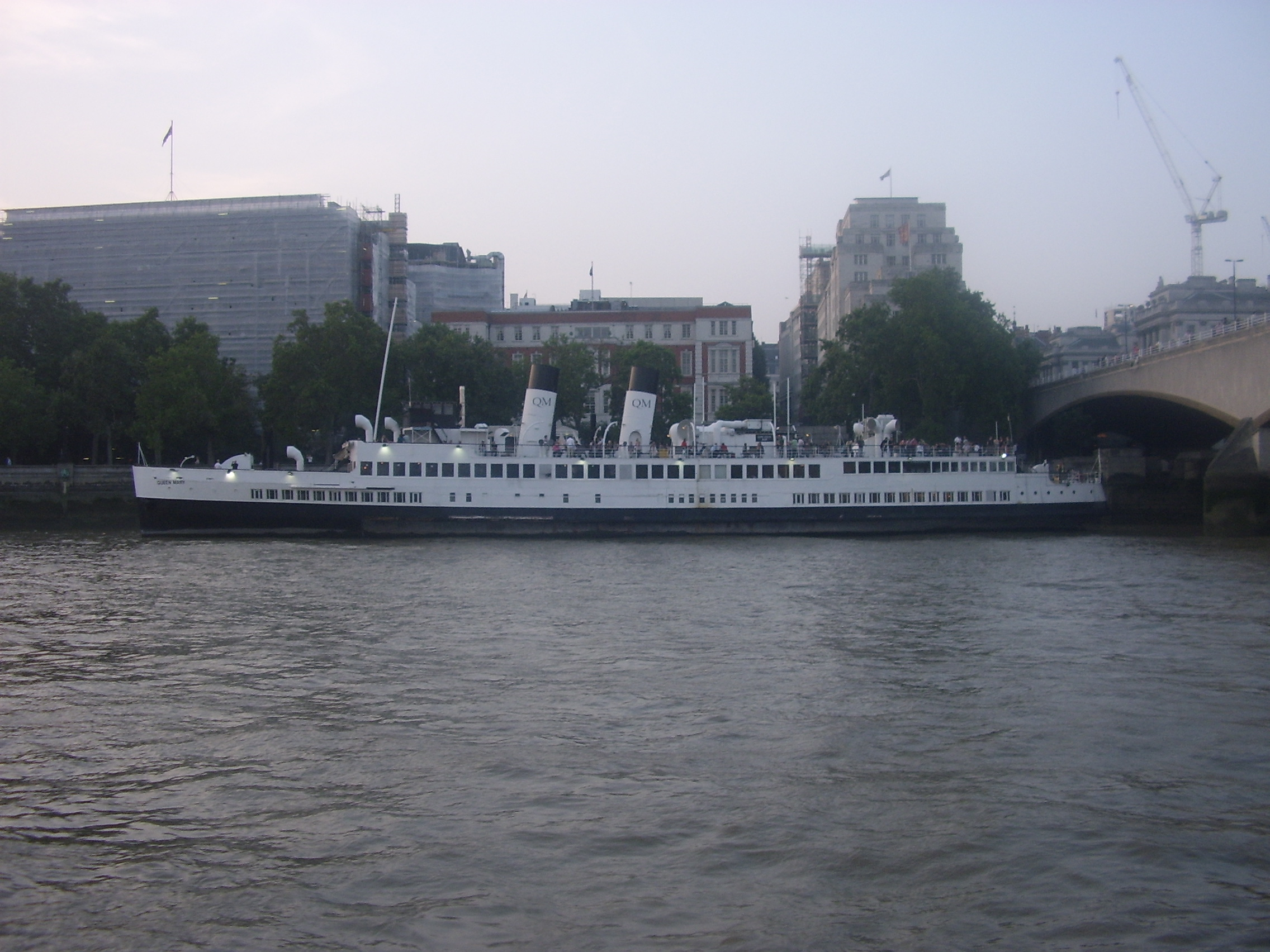
TS Queen Mary on the Thames in 2007, with two funnels restored

TS Queen Mary was auctioned by Capital Marine Services on 24 August 2011, and sold to Ranjan Chowdhury. He planned to restore the vessel to her 1930s glory. In 2012, the charity Friends of the TS Queen Mary was formed, with the clear goal of returning TS Queen Mary to a permanent berth in Glasgow.

In February 2015, TS Queen Mary was served with a prohibition notice by the Maritime and Coastguard Agency, preventing her from leaving the Port of Tilbury until made seaworthy. Later that year, TS Queen Mary was arrested by the Port of Tilbury Limited due to the non-payment of berthing dues by the owner, and once again faced the threat of being scrapped.

Eventually the Port of Tilbury put the vessel up for auction, with Friends of TS Queen Mary's bid which was funded by public donations from across the United Kingdom (with support from the businessman Jim McColl) being accepted, the purchase being finalised in October 2015.

== Return to Scotland ==
A campaign to undertake essential repairs was launched in December 2015, spearheaded by Robbie Coltrane and supported by the Sunday Mail. Donations flooded in from across the UK and by March 2016 all of the funding required (£120,000) was in place. The repairs contract was awarded to Dales Marine (Garvel Clyde), and work started in April 2016.

Following a survey by the MCA, TS Queen Mary received a Loadline Exemption Certificate and was able to be towed from Tilbury back home to Scotland. On 15 May, the vessel arrived back on the Clyde and was berthed in James Watt Dock throughout the summer of 2016.

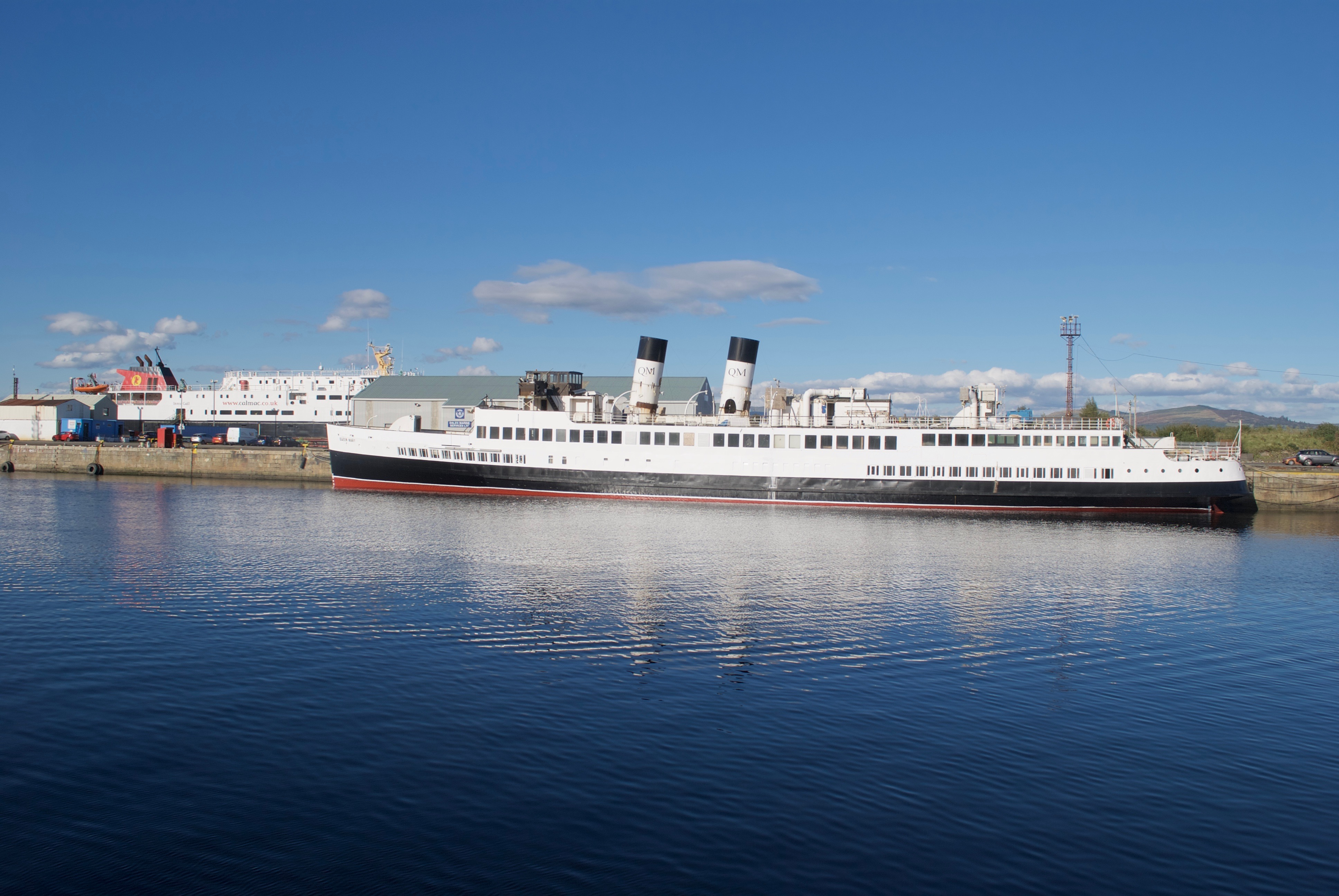
Queen Mary berthed, with MV Hebrides in the dry dock

On 1 September 2016, following a campaign to raise £350,000, TS Queen Mary was towed into Garvel Drydock for renovation works. On 1 October 2016, TS Queen Mary returned to James Watt Dock and on 9 November 2016, she left under tow for Glasgow on what would be her first visit to the city since 1977. She is now berthed at the entrance of Princes' Dock, at Glasgow Science Centre where she is undergoing a major refit to become a permanent heritage destination and education centre.

On 11 March 2022, the ship's royal patron, the Princess Royal, announced that the refit would now be extended to allow Queen Mary to return to passenger cruising in 2024. The plans would now require re-engining.

As of November 2026, restoration work continues at Pacific Quay in Glasgow to restore the vessel to active service.

== See also ==
- List of ships built by William Denny and Brothers
