= HMS King George V =

Two ships of the Royal Navy have been named HMS King George V, after George V, King of the United Kingdom, whilst another was planned:

- HMS King George V was to have been an Orion-class battleship. She was renamed HMS Monarch in 1910, prior to her launch in 1911. Captained by Lord Stanley.
- HMS King George V (1911) was a King George V-class battleship, originally to be named HMS Royal George, but renamed in 1910, before her launch in 1911. She was sold for scrapping in 1926, and was broken up in 1927.
- HMS King George V (41) was a King George V-class battleship launched in 1939 and broken up in 1959.

== Battle honours ==
Ships named King George V have earned the following battle honours:

- Jutland, 1916
- Dunkirk, 1940^{1}
- Atlantic, 1941
- Bismarck, 1941
- Arctic, 1942−43
- Sicily, 1943
- Okinawa, 1945
- Japan, 1945

1: Awarded to merchant vessel TS King George V

== See also ==
- King George V-class battleship (disambiguation)
- TS King George V - passenger steamer owned and operated by David MacBrayne Ltd, and used as a troop carrier during the Second World War.
- George V (disambiguation)
