= MV Lochfyne =

Early British diesel-electric coastal steam boat

History

United Kingdom
- Name: MV Lochfyne
- Namesake: Loch Fyne
- Owner: David MacBrayne Ltd
- Route: Ardrishaig mail service and cruising
- Builder: William Denny and Brothers, Dumbarton
- Yard number: 1256
- Launched: 20 March 1931
- In service: 8 June 1931
- Out of service: 30 September 1969
- Home port: Glasgow
- Fate: Scrapped April 1974

General characteristics
- Type: Passenger ferry
- Tonnage: 754 GRT; 251 NRT
- Length: 215 ft (66 m)
- Beam: 30 ft (9.1 m)
- Draught: 7.50 ft (2.29 m)
- Installed power: 2 × Paxman oil engines, powering; 2 Metrovic electric motors
- Propulsion: Twin screw
- Speed: 16.5 kn (service)
- Capacity: 1200 passengers; (later reduced to 906)

MV Lochfyne was a MacBrayne mail steamer, built in 1931 for the West Highland service, the first British coastal passenger ship with diesel-electric propulsion. After long service, she was withdrawn in 1969 and scrapped in 1974.

== History ==
Lochfyne was built by William Denny and Brothers for David MacBrayne Ltd, the last of four vessels built following the restructuring of the company in 1928. Lochfyne was the first British coastal passenger ship with diesel-electric propulsion and the first in the fleet to have the option of bridge-controlled engines.

In January 1970, Lochfyne was sold to the Northern Slipway Ltd, Dublin. She spent some time as a floating generator and accommodation ship at Faslane. Sold again, in 1972, to Scottish & Newcastle Breweries, it was hoped that she would have a static role, as a floating restaurant. This failed and on 25 March 1974 Lochfyne was towed for scrapping to Arnott Young Ship breakers at Dalmuir, clydebank..

== Layout ==
Lochfyne had a cruiser stern, a straight, slightly raked stem and two funnels (the forward, a dummy). She was a two class vessel, with passenger accommodation, but no overnight accommodation.

Lochfyne was fitted with two 5 cylinder VNS engines installed by Paxman. These produced 1,000 IHP at 330 rpm and powered two 670 hp DC propelling motors. The control system varied the power and hence speed. The electrical machinery was manufactured by Metropolitan-Vickers Electrical Co of Trafford Park, Manchester. The engine space she was visible from the main deck.

She was re-engined with a pair of British Polar K44M two-stroke engines in 1953.

== Service ==
Lochfyne was built for summer cruising in the Western Isles and the Ardrishaig mail service in winter. She was not commissioned during World War II and maintained the Ardrishaig mail from Wemyss Bay until the return of King George V in 1946.

After the withdrawal of Saint Columba in 1958, she became the year-round Ardrishaig boat. She spent some early summers cruising out of Oban, with MV Lochnevis substituting on the Clyde. She made the last ever run on the Royal Route 30 September 1969.

== See also ==
- List of ships built by William Denny and Brothers
