= MV Loch Seaforth (1947) =

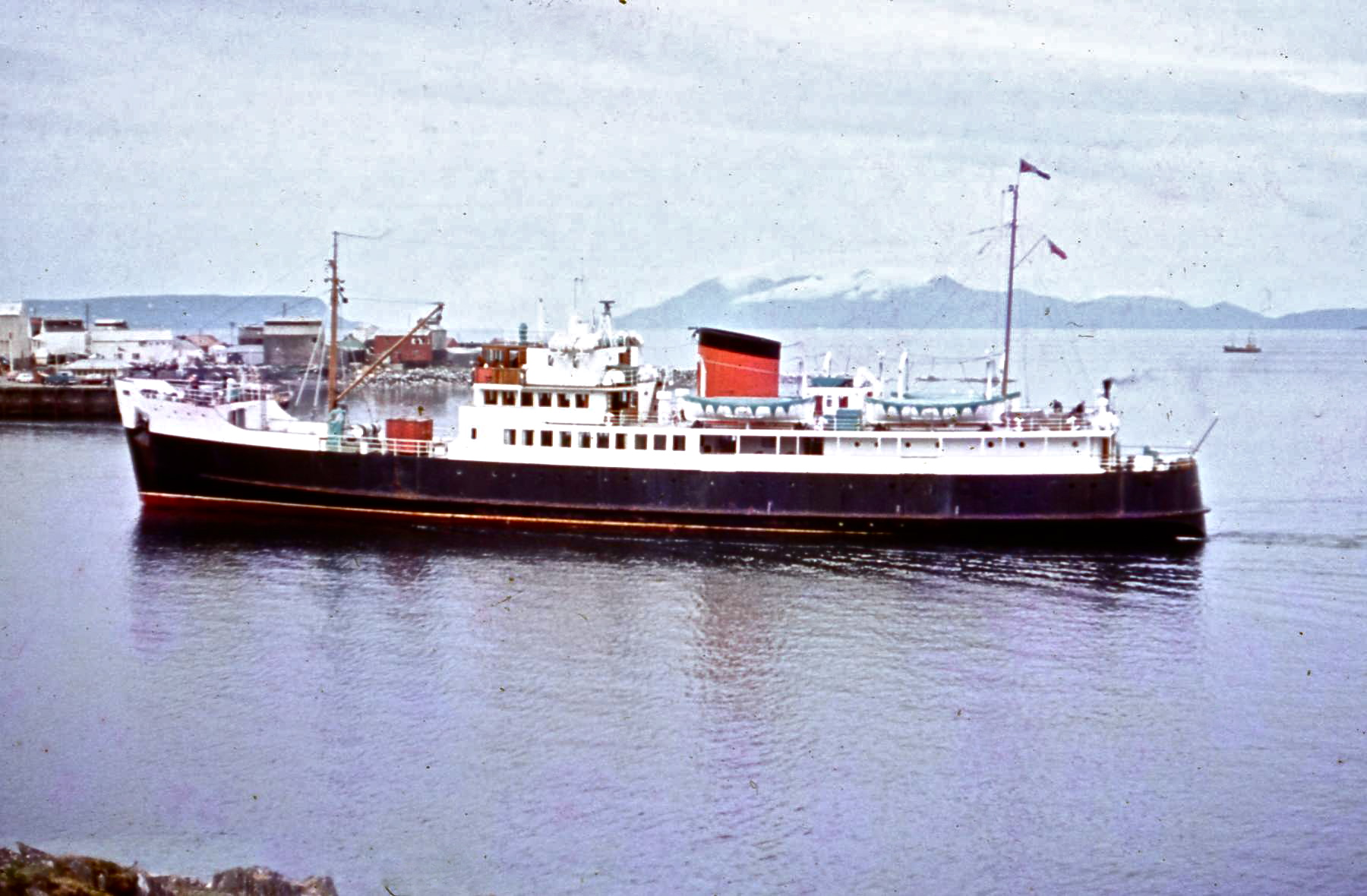
- Loch Seaforth at Mallaig in 1971.

History

United Kingdom
- Name: MV Loch Seaforth
- Namesake: Loch Seaforth, sea loch between Lewis and Harris
- Operator: David MacBrayne Ltd
- Port of registry: Glasgow, United Kingdom
- Route: Stornoway mail boat
- Ordered: late 1945
- Builder: William Denny and Brothers of Dumbarton
- Yard number: 1404
- Launched: 19 May 1947
- In service: 6 December 1947
- Out of service: 1973
- Fate: Broken up June 1973

General characteristics
- Tonnage: 1,126 GRT
- Length: 69.90 m (229 ft 4 in)
- Beam: 11 m (36 ft 1 in)
- Draught: 3.40 m (11 ft 2 in)
- Installed power: 2 x 6-cylinder Sulzer Bros Ltd Winterthur two-stroke diesel engines, 1,800 bhp at 235 rpm
- Propulsion: twin 3-blade propellers
- Speed: 15 knots

MV Loch Seaforth was the Stornoway mailboat operated by David MacBrayne Ltd, from 1947 until 1972. Running aground and sinking in 1973, she blocked the Tiree pier, until removed for scrapping.

== History ==
Built in 1947, Loch Seaforth was the delayed second of two mailboats ordered in 1938; the first, MV Lochiel had entered service in 1939. Larger and faster than her predecessors, she rapidly became a success at Stornoway.

Loch Seaforth remained the biggest MacBrayne ship until the 1964 car ferries. She is the only MacBrayne vessel to have been written off whilst on passenger service.

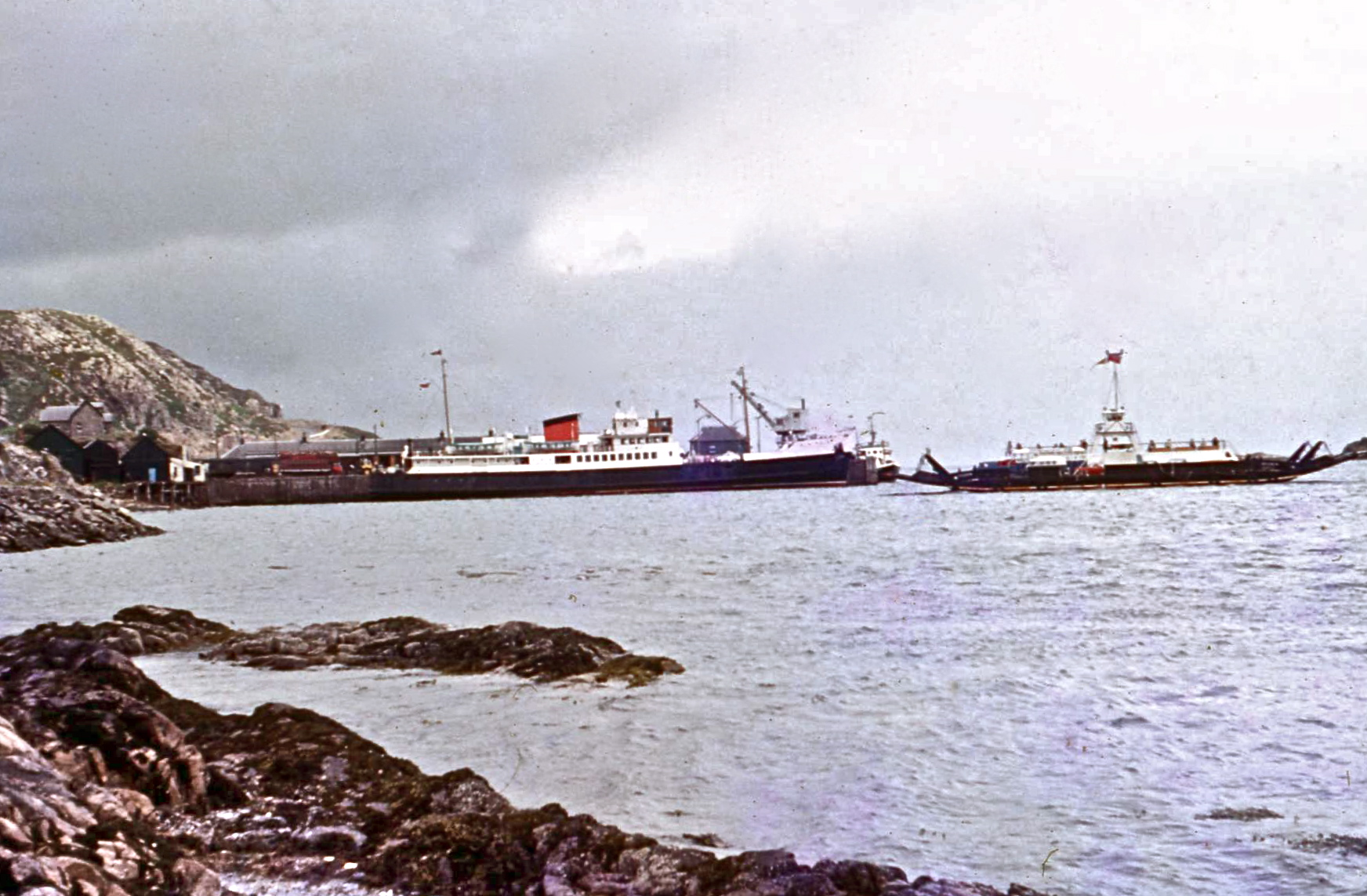
1971 at Kyle of Lochalsh.

She developed a reputation with the press for mishap, with groundings in Kyle, Mallaig and off Longay. The second of those, in 1966, left her high and dry for two days. On 22 March 1973, she ran aground on Cleit Rock in the Sound of Gunna with CalMac General Manager and Chairman on board. All passengers were safely taken off and she was towed to Gott Bay, Tiree. A bulkhead gave way when she was pumped out and she sank completely, blocking Tiree's only pier until 11 May. Floating crane, Magnus III lifted the former Stornoway mailboat onto the beach. She was patched, re-floated and towed to Troon for scrapping.

In 2013, CMAL ran a competition to name the new £42 million replacement ferry, ordered in June 2012 for the Stornoway crossing. The name of which won, revived the name of MacBrayne's mail steamer. Loch Seaforth (II) was constructed at Flensburger Schiffbau-Gesellschaft in Germany, launched on 21 March 2014 and entered commercial service in February 2015.

== Layout ==
Loch Seaforth originally had a short single funnel, later lengthened. All her cargo space was forward and the foremast incorporated two derricks. She had space for sixteen cars on deck. The "MacBrayne Highlander", a "quasi-figurehead" on her bows, appeared in company publicity for many years. In 1949 Loch Seaforth became the first member of the MacBrayne fleet to be fitted with radar.

== Service ==
Built for service from Stornoway, Loch Seaforth started her career there on 6 December 1947, replacing SS Lochness. She spent most of her career on the service to Mallaig and Kyle of Lochalsh. Until 1956, she made a regular call at Applecross and from 1959 to 1963, also provided an occasional car ferry service to Armadale, Skye.

Derrick-loading was slow and traffic was lost to the 1964 hoist-loading MV Hebrides at Uig, Skye. In January 1972, Loch Seaforth was withdrawn from the Stornoway route and transferred to Oban as the Inner Isles mailboat, serving Coll, Tiree, Castlebay and Lochboisdale in place of the younger MV Claymore. Soon after this, Ullapool became the mainland port for Stornoway, initially served by MV Iona and then the converted MV Clansman.

== See also ==
- List of ships built by William Denny and Brothers
