= MV Hebridean Princess =

Cruise ship

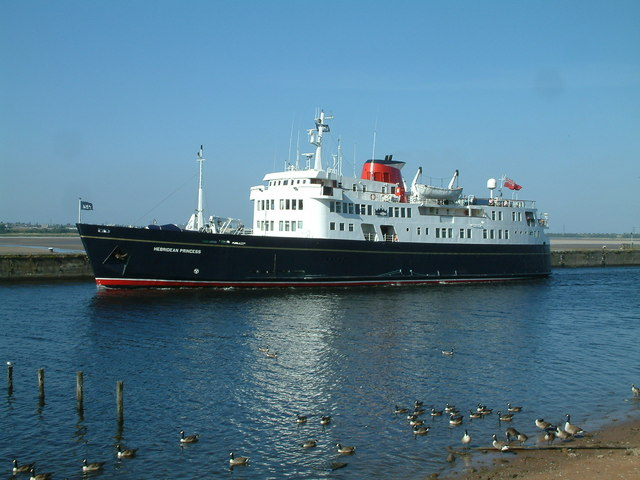
- MV Hebridean Princess in the Manchester Ship Canal at Runcorn

History

United Kingdom
- Name: 1964: MV Columba; 1989: MV Hebridean Princess
- Namesake: 6th-century saint and RMS Columba
- Owner: 1964–1989: Secretary of State for Scotland; 1989–2009: Hebridean Island Cruises; since 2009: All Leisure Holidays Ltd (All Leisure Group)
- Operator: 1964–1973: David MacBrayne Ltd; 1973–1989 Caledonian MacBrayne; since 1989: Hebridean Island Cruises
- Port of registry: 1964: (United Kingdom) Leith; 1989: (United Kingdom) Glasgow
- Route: since 1989: Scotland and Norway
- Builder: Hall, Russell & Company, Aberdeen; Engines: Crossley Bros. Ltd, Manchester
- Yard number: 912
- Launched: 12 March 1964 by Lady Craigton (Note: Wife of Jack Browne, Baron Craigton, the Minister of State for Scotland)
- In service: 30 July 1964
- Home port: Oban
- Identification: IMO number: 6409351; MMSI number: 232649000; Call sign GNHV
- Status: In service
- Notes: 870 passengers; 50 cars (as MV Columba); 49 passengers; 38 crew (as MV Hebridean Princess)

General characteristics
- Tonnage: 2,112 GT
- Length: 72 m (236 ft)
- Beam: 14 m (46 ft)
- Draught: 3 m (10 ft)
- Installed power: 2 × 2 Crossley SCSA each 8 cyls. 10 1/2–13 1/2 in (267–343 mm)
- Propulsion: Bow-thrust propeller fwd
- Speed: 12 kn (22 km/h)

MV Hebridean Princess is a cruise ship operated by Hebridean Island Cruises. She started life as the MacBrayne car ferry and Royal Mail Ship, initially RMS then MV Columba, based in Oban for the first 25 years of her life, carrying up to 600 passengers, and 50 cars, between the Scottish islands.

== RMS Columba ==
RMS Columba was the last of three car ferries built in 1964 by Hall, Russell & Company, Aberdeen for the Secretary of State for Scotland. The Secretary of State for Scotland ordered a trio of near-identical car ferries for the Western Isles. They were chartered to David MacBrayne Ltd and were all equipped to serve as floating nuclear shelters in the event of national emergency. This included vertical sliding watertight doors that could seal off the car deck, immediately aft of the hoist. Columba was the last of the three to enter service. Columba took up the Isle of Mull service, replacing the elderly ships MV Lochearn and MV Lochmor. She continued on this route for nine years. Columba's interiors, and those of her sisters MV Hebrides and MV Clansman, were designed by a young Scottish designer, John McNeece, who was to go on to design the interiors of numerous cruise ships over the next 40 years. In 1968, additional buoyant seating was added on the after deck, boosting her passenger complement from 600 to 870.

Cars were loaded via a forward hydraulic hoist. Below the car deck were sleeping berths for 51.

She was the first vessel to make Sunday sailings, which started in 1972 and were combined with short cruises. There was some opposition to the innovation. 1972 was her last year on the Mull station. That winter, Columba relieved at Stornoway and then took up MV Clansman's roster at Mallaig. Night sailings to Lochboisdale and Castlebay only lasted one year and in 1974 Columba only had the light Mallaig – Armadale, Skye roster. On the withdrawal of the veteran King George V, Columba was restored to Oban, serving Coll and Tiree, Colonsay, Iona, Lochaline and Tobermory. In winter Columba became the regular relief at Uig and, until 1979, of MV Iona on the Outer Isles run.

Columba continued in service after her sisters, MV Hebrides and MV Clansman. Even in CalMac operation, she gave special cruises, including St Kilda and Kishorn Yard as destinations. From 1985 she was the last dedicated hoist-loading vessel in service. In 1988, she was acquired by a new venture, Hebridean Island Cruises of Skipton to offer luxury cruises.

== MV Hebridean Princess ==
She underwent a major refit at George Prior Engineering in Great Yarmouth in 1989, emerging as the cruise ship, MV Hebridean Princess. She began operating on 26 May 1989 and provides cruises around the Western Isles of Scotland. More recently, itineraries have been extended to include Ireland, the Orkney and Shetland islands, the Norwegian Fjords and the Isles of Scilly.

Initially, she retained a car-carrying capability, giving the option of leaving at intermediate ports. Within two years the car-carrying capacity was removed and additional cabins constructed to allow a dramatic increase in the crew-to-guest ratio. By 1997, a crew of 37 was serving just 49 passengers in considerable luxury.

From 21 July to 29 July 2006, Queen Elizabeth II chartered Hebridean Princess for a holiday around the Scottish Islands to mark her 80th birthday. The Queen reportedly paid £125,000 for the use of the ship.

In June 2009, All Leisure Group, which also owns the Swan Hellenic and Voyages of Discovery lines, purchased the company. The company name was changed from Hebridean International Cruises (used when MV Hebridean Spirit was operating deep-sea itineraries), to its current name, but the ship continues to operate as it did before the take over.

In 2010 Queen Elizabeth II chartered Hebridean Princess for another holiday around the Scottish Islands, sailing from Stornoway on 23 July for two weeks.
