= MV Lochearn =

History

United Kingdom
- Name: MV Lochearn; 1964: Naias
- Namesake: Loch Earn
- Owner: David MacBrayne
- Port of registry: Glasgow
- Route: Inner Isles mail steamer from Oban
- Builder: Ardrossan Dockyard; Engines: i) Norris Henty & Gardner, Manchester; ii) Paxman Ricardo diesel
- Yard number: 348
- Launched: 29 April 1930
- Out of service: 1964
- Fate: Scrapped

General characteristics
- Type: Passenger Cargo Vessel
- Tonnage: 542 GRT
- Length: 162 ft (49 m)
- Beam: 29 ft (8.8 m)
- Draught: 9 ft (2.7 m)
- Installed power: 2 oil 4SA each 12cy 660bhp
- Propulsion: Twin screw
- Speed: 12 knots; <10 knot (service)
- Capacity: 400 passengers; 500 ton cargo

MV Lochearn was a mail steamer operated by David MacBrayne from Oban to Barra and South Uist from 1930 until 1955. She then became the Sound of Mull mail steamer until 1964, when she was superseded by a new generation of car ferry and sold for further service in the Greek Islands.

== History ==
MV Lochearn and her sister MV Lochmor were built by Ardrossan Dockyard. She was launched on 29 April 1930.

In March 1931 in thick fog, Lochearn ran aground on a sandbank at Lonbane, Applecross. Lochmor went to assist but she also became stuck. The 85 year old paddle steamer Glencoe successfully towed them both off.

On 14 May 1932, Lochearn struck rocks off Tiree in the Inner Hebrides and was beached. She was later refloated, repaired, and returned to service.

After the war, both sisters were fitted with Paxman Ricardo diesel engines, improving their performance.

With the introduction of the 1964 hoist-loading car ferries, Hebrides, Clansman and Columba, Lochearn became redundant. She and her sister Lochmor were sold to Greek owners on 26 August 1964, renamed Naias and Amimoni and left Scotland for service in the Greek Islands.

In Greece, she was converted to a private motor yacht. It is believed she was broken up in January 1975.

== Layout ==
Lochearn was a passenger and cargo vessel, with cabins for 22 passengers. Passenger accommodation consisted of a dining room, lounge and smoking room, with first and second class cabins. Vehicles were loaded, along with other cargo, using crane and sling.

== Service ==
Based in Oban, Lochearn was the Inner Isles mail steamer, serving Tobermory, Coll, Tiree, Barra and South Uist until 1955 when she was replaced by MV Claymore. From 1955 to 1964, she sailed from Tobermory to Oban with calls at Salen, Lochaline and Craignure.
