= SS Lochness =

History

United Kingdom
- Name: SS Lochness; 1955: Valmarina; 1958: Myrtidiotissa
- Namesake: Loch Ness
- Owner: David MacBrayne Ltd
- Port of registry: Glasgow
- Route: Stornoway mail; 1947–1955: relief
- Builder: Harland & Wolff, Govan, Glasgow; Engines: Bergius Kelvin, Glasgow
- Yard number: 872
- Launched: 6 June 1929
- Completed: 9 July 1929
- In service: 1 August 1929
- Out of service: 1955
- Identification: IMO number: 5244833
- Fate: Scrapped 15 March 1973 in Perama, Greece

General characteristics
- Type: Passenger Cargo Vessel
- Tonnage: 777 GRT
- Length: 63.64 m (208.8 ft)
- Beam: 10.39 m (34.1 ft)
- Draught: 3.20 m (10.5 ft)
- Installed power: 2 x 4SCSA, each 6 cyls. (5" x 5 5/8")
- Speed: 14 knots

SS Lochness was a David MacBrayne Ltd mail steamer launched in 1929. She served Stornoway until 1947 and as relief vessel until 1955. As Myrtidiotissa, she survived in the Aegean until the 1970s.

== History ==
SS Lochness was a mail steamer, built by Harland & Wolff, Govan, the first of four new vessels built under the terms of the constitution of the new company, David MacBrayne (1928) Ltd. She was the third vessel to carry the name and the last steamship ordered by MacBrayne's. Launched on 6 June 1929, she ran trials on 9 July and gave her first public service, to Tarbert, Loch Fyne, during Glasgow Fair Holiday.

With the introduction of Claymore in 1955, Lochness became redundant and was sold to Italian owners. As Myrtidiotissa, she survived in the Aegean until the 1970s.

== Layout ==
Lochness was a cargo and passenger boat, with sleeping accommodation. She loaded vehicles along with other cargo, using crane and sling.

== Service ==
Lochness was built for the Mallaig – Kyle – Stornoway route, to replace SS Sheila which had been wrecked in 1927. She entered service on this route on 1 August 1929 and soon became too small for the route. In 1947, she was displaced by MV Loch Seaforth and became the relief overnight steamer. Until 1955, she was found throughout the Outer Hebrides deputising for other vessels.
