= List of ships built by William Denny and Brothers =

This is a list of ships built by William Denny and Brothers, Dumbarton, Scotland.

== Ships ==
Launched	Ship's name at launch	Tonnage (GRT)	Yard number	Notes
1845	PS Loch Lomond	106	1	Built for the Dumbarton Steamboat Co. Moved to Liverpool in 1852.
1845	PS Rob Roy	30	2	Built for the Dumbarton Steamboat Co. Operated on Loch Katrine. Scuttled in 1859.
1845	SS Waterwitch	275	3	Built for the Taylor and Scott of Dublin. Sank on 2 November 1861 in a storm just after leaving the River Clyde.
1846	PS Premier	127	6	Built for the Dumbarton Steamboat Co. Moved to Weymouth in 1852. Cosens & Co Ltd pleasure steamer for several decades. Scrapped 1938.
1846	SS Erin's Queen	273	7	Collided with the Steamer Sabrina in the Bristol Channel on 6 January 1855. Written off.
1847	SS Northman	182	9	Built for the Orkney Steam Navigation Company. Sank in 1859
1847	SS Marchioness of Bredalbane	135	11	Sold via P&O to the Pasha of Egypt Muhammad Ali.
1847	SS Lochfine	83	12	Built for the Glasgow & Lochfyne Steam Packet Company. Broken up in 1896
1847	SS Dumbarton Youth	238	15	
1848	SS Ayrshire Lass	94	23	Built for the Girvan Steam Packet Company
1849	SS Chevy Chase	370	24	
1849	SS Victory	500		Built for the North-West Steam Packet Company.
1849	Miner	32	27	Sailing vessel
1849	SS British Queen	772	28	Built for Brownlow, Pearson & Company of Hull
1853	William Denny	596		First steamship to link Auckland and Sydney. Aground near Murimotu Island in 1857 and abandoned in 1858.
1858	SS Nova Scotian		68	Built for the Allan Line. Served for 34 years. Scrapped 1893.
1859	Bohemian	2,108		Sank in Casco Bay on approach to Portland, Maine, after striking an underwater ledge on 22 February 1864.
1862	SS City of Cork	1,547	86	Built for the Inman Line.
1869	Cutty Sark	963		Completed by Denny's after the liquidation of her contracted builders, Scott & Linton. Preserved in a dry dock at Greenwich, London
1870	SS Parthia	3,167	148	Built for Cunard Line. Served for 86 years; scrapped 1956.
1882	SS Cheribon	3,075	261	Built for the Compagnie Nationale de Navigation as a passenger ship, especially for immigrants to the USA. Converted into a troop ship for French soldiers in the Sino-French War. Wrecked off Panama in 1902.
1884	Lucinda	301	282	Government yacht, ordered by the Queensland Government by letter dated 30 January 1883, delivered 20 December 1884. Connected to the drafting of the Australian Constitution.
1886	SS Jumna	5,197	312	Steel passenger and cargo steamship built in 1886 by William Denny and Brothers in Dumbarton, Scotland, for British India Associated Steamers Ltd (managed by the British India Steam Navigation Company). Constructed specifically to serve the Queensland Royal Mail route, she carried mail, cargo, and thousands of assisted immigrants from Great Britain to Australia during the late 19th century
1889	SS Aramac	2,114	415	Built for the Australian United Steam Navigation Company
1889	SS Arawatta	2,114	416	Built for the Australian United Steam Navigation Company
1893	SS Coya	546	463	Veteran steamship on Lake Titicaca, Peru, now a floating restaurant
1895	SS Vladimir	5,331	507	Built for Russian Volunteer Fleet Association, Odessa. Purchased in 1915 by the Imperial Russian Navy.
1899	SS Sir Walter Scott	115	623	Veteran steamship still on Loch Katrine, Scotland
1901	TS King Edward	562	651	Excursion steamer, the first commercial vessel to be driven by steam turbines
1902	TS Queen Alexandra	665	670	Destroyed by fire 1911; sold to Canada
1903	TSS Kanowna	6,953	671	Australian United Steam Navigation Company passenger liner requisitioned as a troop ship and then a hospital ship. Foundered 1929.
1903	SS Kyarra	6,953	672	Australian United Steam Navigation Company passenger liner requisitioned as a hospital ship. Sunk by torpedo 1918
1905	TSS Arahura	1607	755	Passenger and cargo ship (also schooner rigged) built for the Union Steam Ship Company and operated in New Zealand coastal waters until May 1949. Hulk sunk as a target in 1952.
1905	SS Maheno	5282	746	Passenger ship owned by Union Company of New Zealand. Washed ashore on Fraser Island, Queensland, Australia while under tow to be scrapped in July 1935.
1906	TSS Duchess of Argyll	583	770	3 direct drive steam turbines, 21.6 knots LMS/CSP Passenger Vessel for the Ardrossan - Arran service; later on the Stranraer - Larne service; Scrapped 1970
1907	TSS Victoria	1689	789	2 direct drive steam turbines, 21.75 knots SE&CR Cross-channel ferry; later Isle of Man Steam Packet Co; Scrapped 1957
1908	SS Otaki	7,420	835	New Zealand Shipping Company refrigerated cargo liner; sunk 1917
1909	SS Ruahine	10,870	880	New Zealand Shipping Company liner; later Italian-flagged; scrapped 1957
1910	SS Rotorua	11,130	915	New Zealand Shipping Company liner; sunk 1917
1910	HMAS Yarra	700		Commonwealth Naval Forces Destroyer; struck 1928
1912	SS Indarra	9,735	966	Australian United Steam Navigation Company passenger liner, in 1920 Lloyd Royal Belge Pays de Waes and from 1923 Osaka Shosen KK Horai Maru. Japanese troopship in World War 2, sunk 1942.
1912	SS Infanta Isabel de Borbon	10,348	969	Compañía Transatlántica Española passenger liner, renamed Uruguay in 1931, prison ship from 1934. Sunk by a Nationalist air raid on Barcelona in 1939. Raised and scrapped.
1912	TS Queen Alexandra	785/827	970	1935 renamed Saint Columba and took over Glasgow to Ardrishaig until scrapped in 1958.
1912	TSS Brighton			Newhaven to Dieppe ferry.
1913	TSS Paris			Newhaven to Dieppe ferry. Sister ship to TSS Brighton. First ship to be fitted with the Michell Tilting Pad Thrust Bearing.
1924	SS Sagaing		1167	Built for P Henderson & Company's Shaw, Savill & Albion Line as a passenger and cargo ship. Severely damaged by the Imperial Japanese Navy in the Easter Sunday Raid on Trincomalee Harbour in 1942. Hulk sunk in 1943.
1925	Delta King		1168	Stern Wheel Paddle Steamer
1925	Delta Queen		1169	Stern Wheel Paddle Steamer
1925	TSS Glen Sannox	690	1170	3 shaft, single reduction Parsons geared turbines, triple screws, 21.5 knots LMS/CSP Passenger Vessel for the Ardrossan-Arran service; Scrapped 1954
1926	TS King George V	985	1182	Pioneering turbine steamer built for Turbine Steamers Ltd.
1929	MV Armadale	5066	1223	Cargo ship Armadale was built for Australind Steam Shipping Co.; Scrapped 1964
1930	TS Duchess of Montrose	806	1245	Turbine steamer built for CSP, operated until 1964. The first single-class Clyde vessel.
1931	MV Lochfyne	656	1256	David MacBrayne passenger vessel. First British-built diesel-electric passenger ship. Re-engined 1953 with British Polar diesels. Withdrawn from service 1969. Scrapped after attempted restaurant conversion in 1974.
1933	TS Queen Mary	871	1262	Turbine steamer built for Williamson-Buchanan, operated until 1977. The largest (though not the longest) excursion turbine on the River Clyde. Converted into a floating pub in 1987 and moored in London. Returned to the Clyde in 2016 and now being restored.
1934	PS Caledonia	623	1266	CSP Paddle Steamer. Latterly, a floating pub in London until destroyed by fire in 1980.
1935	SS Anselm	5,954	1276	Booth Steamship Co cargo and passenger liner. Converted into troop ship 1940; sunk by torpedo 1941
1936	MV Lochnevis	573	1273	David MacBrayne (1928) Ltd diesel-electric passenger vessel; Scrapped 1974
1936	MV Countess of Breadalbane	106	1294	CSP for Loch Awe service, later Clyde, then Loch Lomond; Scrapped 1999
1937	PS Ryde	603	1306	Paddle steamer built for the Southern Railway. Ryde was the last coal-fired sea-going paddle steamer in the world when taken out of service in 1969.
1938	MV Lymington	403	1322	Isle of Wight ferry which became MV Sound of Sanda for Western Ferries
1938	MV The Second Snark	50	1327	Former Denny-owned tug / tender on the River Clyde
1939	SS Royal Daffodil	2,061	1330	Thames Estuary / Continent day excursion for Steam Navigation Company Ltd, London; Scrapped Feb 1967
1939	MV Lochiel	603	1341	David MacBrayne Mailboat on Islay, Port Askaig and other routes; Scrapped Dec 1995
1941	SS Empire Cameron	7,015	1358	Empire class cargo vessel Empire Cameron; Scrapped Nov 1963
1947	MV Princess Victoria	2,694	1399	LMS ferry based in Stranraer; Sank Jan 1953
1947	MV Loch Seaforth	1,090	1404	David MacBrayne mailboat Mallaig - Kyle of Lochalsh - Stornoway; Scrapped June 1973
1948	MV Southsea	986	1411	Portsmouth – Ryde ferry for British Transport Commission. In service until 1986, then in reserve until 1997. Latterly owned in part by the Southsea Preservation Society in association with the Avon River Historic Vessel & Navigation Trust in 2002. Scrapped in 2005 in Denmark.
1948	MV Royal Sovereign	1,851	1413	General Steam Navigation Company. Originally summer excursions from Thames to Continent; 1967 Townsend Car Ferries Ltd
1948	PS Teal	460	1418	River passenger & cargo Paddle Steamer built for India General Navigation & Railway Company
1948	PS Tern	460	1419	River passenger & cargo Paddle Steamer built for India General Navigation & Railway Company
1951	MV Tofua	5,299	1447	Union Steam Ship Company ferry.
1950	MV Royal Iris	1,234	1448	Former Mersey ferry, now berthed at Woolwich, London
1951	MV Portree	53	1458	CSP Passenger Car Ferry
1951	MV Lochalsh	24	1459	CSP Passenger Car Ferry for Lochalsh-Kyleakin ferry
1953	MV Fenerbahçe	994	1456	Former Passenger Ferry, now a museum ship in Istanbul, Turkey
1953	MV Arran	568	1470	CSP Passenger Car Ferry
1953	MV Broadford		1483	CSP Passenger Car Ferry built for British Railways Board
1957	MV Bardic	2,550		Built for the Atlantic Steam Navigation Co Ltd made her maiden voyage on 2 September 1957 on the Preston to Larne route.
1957	MV Ionic	2,557		Built for the Atlantic Steam Navigation Co Ltd made her maiden voyage on 10 October 1958 on the Preston to Larne route.
1957	HMS Jaguar	2,560	1476	Leopard class frigate. Last frigate built by Dennys. Now BNS Ali Haider in Bangladesh Navy
1957	Koolama II	3,377	1490	Built for Stateships, Western Australia, later renamed Grain Trader and Eastern Peace, scrapped 1980
1961	TSS Caledonian Princess	3,630	1501	Irish Sea/English Channel car ferry; later Tuxedo Princess nightclub on the Tyne.
1961	GMV Aramoana	4,160	1502	Final ship completed by the yard. The first Interislander road/rail ferry used between Picton and Wellington by New Zealand Government Railways. Scrapped 1994.
	Denny D2 Hoverbus			
1964	MV Melbrook		1504	Cargo ship; completed by Alexander Stephen at Linthouse (yard number 685) after Denny's closure

== See also ==
- Scottish Built Ships database
