= TS Queen Alexandra =

Clyde-built turbine steamer (1912-1958)

History

United Kingdom
- Name: TS Queen Alexandra; 1936: Saint Columba
- Owner: 1912: Turbine Steamers; 1935: David MacBrayne
- Port of registry: (United Kingdom) Glasgow
- Builder: William Denny and Brothers, Dumbarton
- Launched: 8 April 1912
- Maiden voyage: 23 May 1912
- In service: 1912
- Out of service: 1958
- Fate: Scrapped, 1958

General characteristics
- Tonnage: 785 gross register tons (GRT) increased to 827
- Length: 270.3 ft (82.4 m)
- Beam: 32.1 ft (9.8 m)
- Propulsion: Steam Turbine
- Speed: 21.5 kn (trials)

TS Queen Alexandra was a MacBrayne turbine steamer built in 1912 and operating cruises on the Clyde. Following extensive modifications, in 1935, as Saint Columba, she took over the "Royal Route" from Glasgow to Ardrishaig until scrapped in 1958.

== History ==
TS Queen Alexandra was built in 1912 by William Denny and Brothers, Dumbarton for Turbine Steamers Ltd, to replace a previous Queen Alexandra of 1902, which had been extensively damaged by fire. The new Queen was designed for the long distance cruises. Her first public sailing was on 23 May 1912 to Campbeltown. Fast and manoeuvrable, she soon became a popular boat.

In 1935, her owners Turbine Steamers Ltd were sold to David MacBrayne Ltd and the turbine steamers King George V and Queen Alexandra transferred to the Western Isles. Queen Alexandra went for refit at Lamont's shipyard, where she was transformed. This was all in preparation for her new role on the "Royal Route". Her similarity to Cunard's Queen Mary earned her the nickname "MacBrayne's little Cunarder".

Withdrawn after 48 years of sterling service in September 1958, she was towed to Smith & Houston's shipyard in Port Glasgow on 23 December 1958 and was scrapped.

== Layout ==
Queen Alexandra was the longest turbine steamer ever built for service on the Clyde and remains the only three funnelled steamer ever to have served on the Clyde. Initially open, her promenade deck was enclosed, providing shelter. In 1935, her upper deck was extended aft, a third funnel fitted and a new smoke room, called the Clachan Bar installed. She was repainted in MacBrayne colours and renamed Saint Columba. In 1937, she became the first Clyde steamer to be converted permanently to oil fuel.

== Service ==
Queen Alexandra operated long distance cruises to Campbeltown and Inveraray, departing Glasgow’s Bridge Wharf at 7.11.

== World War I Service ==
She was requisitioned by the Admiralty as a troop transport ship in 1915, and operated in the English Channel between England and France ferrying soldiers and war materials to supply the Western Front. During her war service she rammed and sank the German Imperial Navy's U-boat UC-78 off of the French coast at Cherbourg on 9 May 1918.

== Return to cruising ==
At the end of the war she was released by the Admiralty and returned to the River Clyde in 1919 and resumed her long distance cruises, most often to Inveraray. After her extensive 1935 refit, she replaced the legendary paddle steamer RMS Columba on the "Royal Route" from Glasgow to Ardrishaig. She gave sterling service on this route from 1935 until the outbreak of war in 1939.

== World War II Service ==
During World War II, she was again requisitioned by the Admiralty and, possibly in view of her age, served as an accommodation ship in Greenock's East India Harbour.

== Final years ==
She was the last Clyde steamer to be returned to peacetime duties, resuming her service from Glasgow to Ardrishaig from 1947 until 1958.

== See also ==
- List of ships built by William Denny and Brothers
