= David MacBrayne =

Government-owned Scottish Ferry holding company

David MacBrayne Ltd
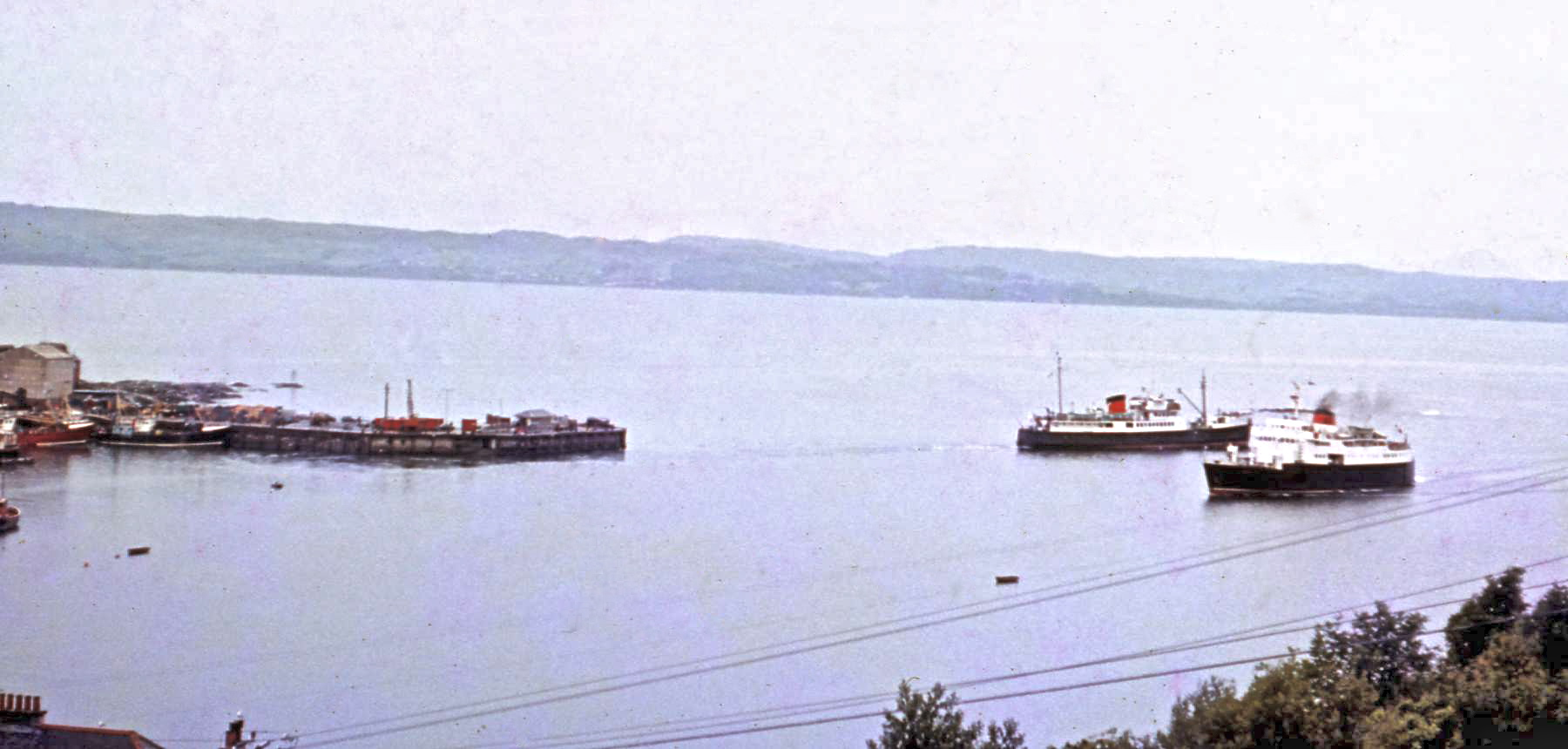
- David MacBrayne vessels Clansman and Loch Seaforth pass at Mallaig in 1971.
- Type: Public company
- Industry: Ferry operator holding company
- Founded: 1851, reconstituted in 2006
- Headquarters: Gourock, Scotland, UK
- Area served: Hebrides of Scotland and the Firth of Clyde

David MacBrayne is a limited company owned by the Scottish Government. Formed in 1851 as the private shipping company David Hutcheson & Co. with three partners, David Hutcheson, Alexander Hutcheson and David MacBrayne, it passed in 1878 to David MacBrayne.

It became the main carrier for freight and passengers in the Hebrides, with a co-ordinated network of shipping, road haulage and bus operations. In 1973, it was merged with Caledonian Steam Packet Company as state-owned Caledonian MacBrayne. Since 2006 it has been the holding company for ferry operators CalMac Ferries Ltd (operating as Caledonian MacBrayne) and Argyll Ferries, and is classified as an executive non-departmental public body of the Scottish Government.

== Formation ==
David MacBrayne Ltd house flag

In 1851, Burns Brothers, G. and J. Burns of Glasgow, passed their fleet of Hebridean vessels to their chief clerk, David Hutcheson. David Hutcheson was married to Margaret Dawson, who was born at her parents home 'Bonnytoun House' in Linlithgow. She was the sister of Adam Dawson, who owned the St. Magdalene Whisky Distillery in Linlithgow, and James Dawson, who were also born at 'Bonnytoun House'.

The new company, David Hutcheson & Co., had three partners, David Hutcheson, Alexander Hutcheson and David MacBrayne (1817-1907), nephew of Messrs. Burns. In 1878, the company passed to David MacBrayne (and was renamed David MacBrayne).

The company rapidly became the main carrier on the West Highland routes, providing passenger and freight services to most islands. It initially operated from Glasgow down the Firth of Clyde through the Crinan Canal to Oban and Fort William, and on through the Caledonian Canal to Inverness. It added the mail run to Islay, Harris and North Uist from Skye and then the Outer Isles run from Oban to Barra and South Uist. As each opened, the company added the railheads at Oban, Mallaig, and Stromeferry, subsequently extended to Kyle of Lochalsh.

MacBraynes remained in the hands of the family until 1928, when it was unable to support a bid for the renewal of the mail contract and effectively became bankrupt. No other operator was found for the contract and the company was reformed, with ownership divided between Coast Lines and the London, Midland and Scottish Railway (LMS).

== Expansion ==
The new owners rebuilt the ageing fleet with motor vessels such as MV Lochfyne, MV Lochnevis and MV Lochiel. After the Second World War, MV Loch Seaforth and MV Claymore were added.

In 1948 the shares in the company owned by the LMS Railway passed to the British Transport Commission, thus partially nationalising it.

In 1964, the rising number of motor vehicles led to the ordering of three purpose-built vessels, MV Hebrides, MV Clansman and MV Columba for the Uig-Tarbert-Lochmaddy, Mallaig-Armadale and Oban-Craignure-Lochaline routes.

== Bus services ==
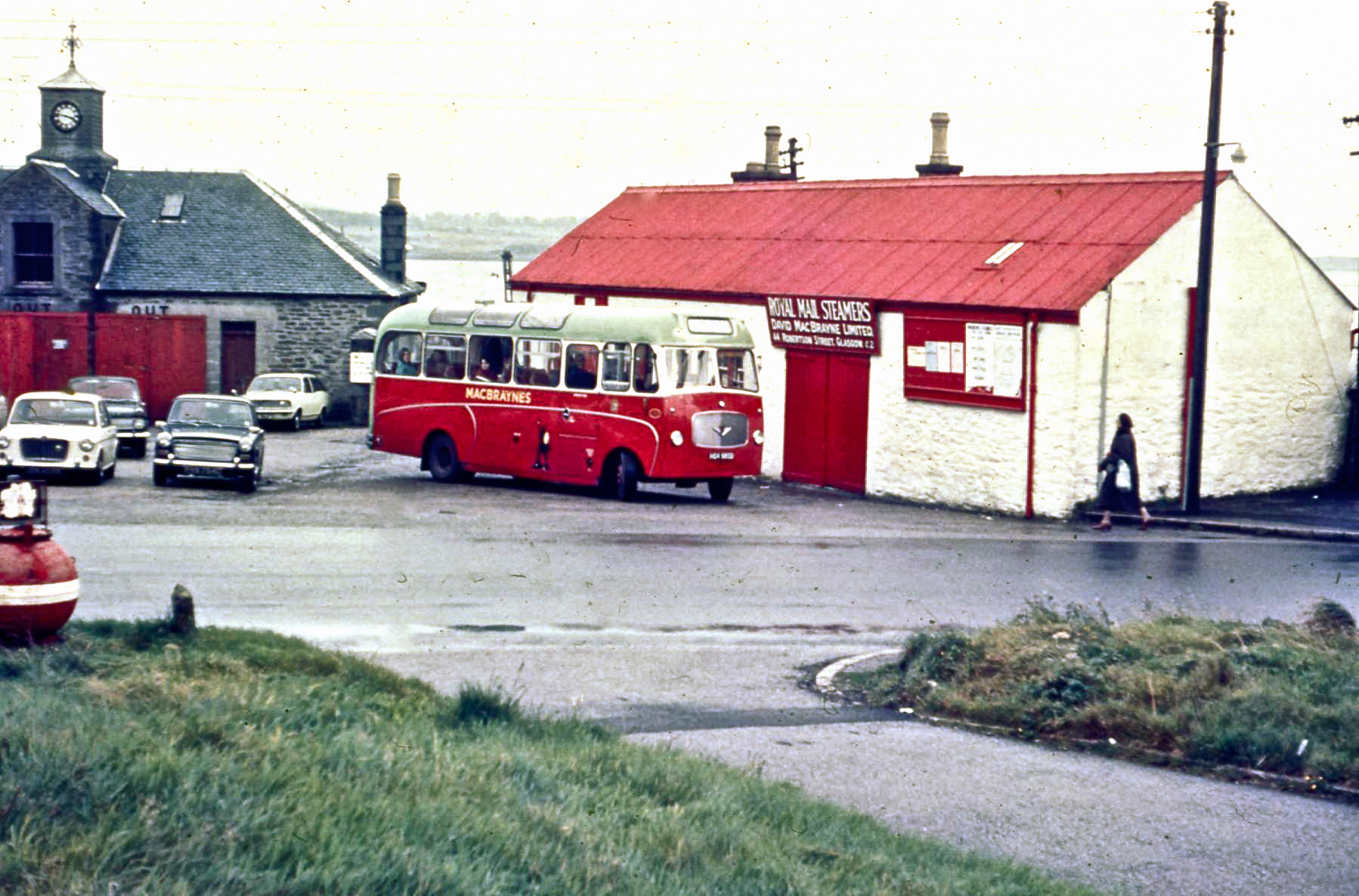
MacBrayne Bedford VAS bus at Ardrishaig 1970, when MacBrayne buses operated in many parts of the west coast and islands

Motor bus services began with a Fort William to Ballachulish route in 1906, and by the outbreak of the First World War several other bus routes had been established around Inverness, Fort William and Ardrishaig. No routes actually connected these detached operations with each other at that stage, and road operations remained a very small part of the business until after the reconstituting of the company in 1928. The new owners provided capital to modernise the business, including setting up a substantial road haulage division to replace cargo shipping services at many of the smaller ports. Expansion of the bus division was gradual, and mainly achieved by acquisition of existing small operators.

In 1929 Link Line of Glasgow introduced a coach route from Glasgow to Tarbert (Kintyre) in competition with MacBrayne's steamer service, and MacBrayne quickly responded by introducing its own coach service, which would become one of the firm's principal routes. Coaches were timed to connect at Tarbert with MacBrayne's steamer to Islay and McConnachie of Campbeltown's bus service to that town. Link Line sold out to MacBrayne in 1932 ending the competition, although from 1935 onward West Coast Motors of Campbeltown provided an overnight passenger and mail coach service between Campbeltown and Glasgow. MacBrayne's own buses did not reach Campbeltown until 1940, when they replaced the Glasgow to Campbeltown steamer. MacBraynes and West Coast co-existed on the route thereafter.

Another significant takeover was of Shields of Kinlochleven in 1934. Shields operated a service from Fort William to Tyndrum, where a connection could be made with W. Alexander & Sons' Oban to Glasgow (via Helensburgh) service. MacBrayne extended some journeys on this route through to Glasgow (via Luss), although connections with the Alexander service also continued. McIntyre of Fort William was acquired in 1936, giving MacBrayne an interest in the Fort William to Fort Augustus route, and through services between Fort William and Inverness were finally introduced in 1939 following cessation of the Fort Augustus to Inverness steamer.

This important route was jointly operated with Macrae & Dick of Inverness (a Highland Omnibuses predecessor). Various other small operators were taken over in the 1930s and 1940s, expanding or consolidating the route network on the mainland. Most MacBrayne bus services carried parcels and in some cases mail as well as passengers. In addition to the stage carriage routes, MacBraynes developed a significant coach tour operation in the West Highlands, often operated in conjunction with the firm's pleasure steamers.

On the islands served by MacBrayne steamers, connecting bus services were provided by local independent operators, but from 1941 onwards MacBrayne began to take over many of these businesses and to operate the buses themselves. Firms so acquired were McGibbon of Bowmore (Islay) in 1941, MacKinnon of Askernish (South Uist) in 1947, Ferguson of Clachan (South Uist) in 1947, MacLean & Donald of Ardvasar (Skye) in 1948, MacDonald of Sollas (North Uist) in 1948, Skye Transport (a Scottish Co-operative Wholesale Society subsidiary) of Portree (Skye) in 1958, Cameron of Tarbert (Harris) in 1964, Cowe of Tobermory (Mull) in 1964 and finally Carson of Dunvegan (Skye) in 1970.

Postwar expansion on the mainland included a detached operation on the Ardgour Peninsula. When Ardgour and Acharacle Motor Services ceased trading at the end of 1950, MacBaynes took over their services connecting Acharacle and Kilchoan with the Corran Ferry, by which means onward connection could be made with MacBrayne's buses for Fort William or Glasgow. MacBraynes also took over operation of the ferry itself in 1954. Another acquisition on the mainland was Campbell of Glenshiel in 1960, with the route from Inverness to Kyle of Lochalsh and a connecting service from Shiel Bridge to Glenelg.

Due to the highly dispersed nature of its operations, the MacBrayne bus fleet used a remarkably large number of bus depots relative to its size, none of which was particularly large and many of which were simply small sheds for overnight parking of one vehicle. For example, the five-vehicle operation on Islay had a depot at Port Ellen and overnight sheds at Port Askaig and Portnahaven. Many garage facilities were shared with the company's road haulage fleet. The largest bus depot was Fort William, and other larger facilities were at Ardrishaig, Glasgow, Inverness, Kinlochleven, and Portree.

== Divestments and merger ==
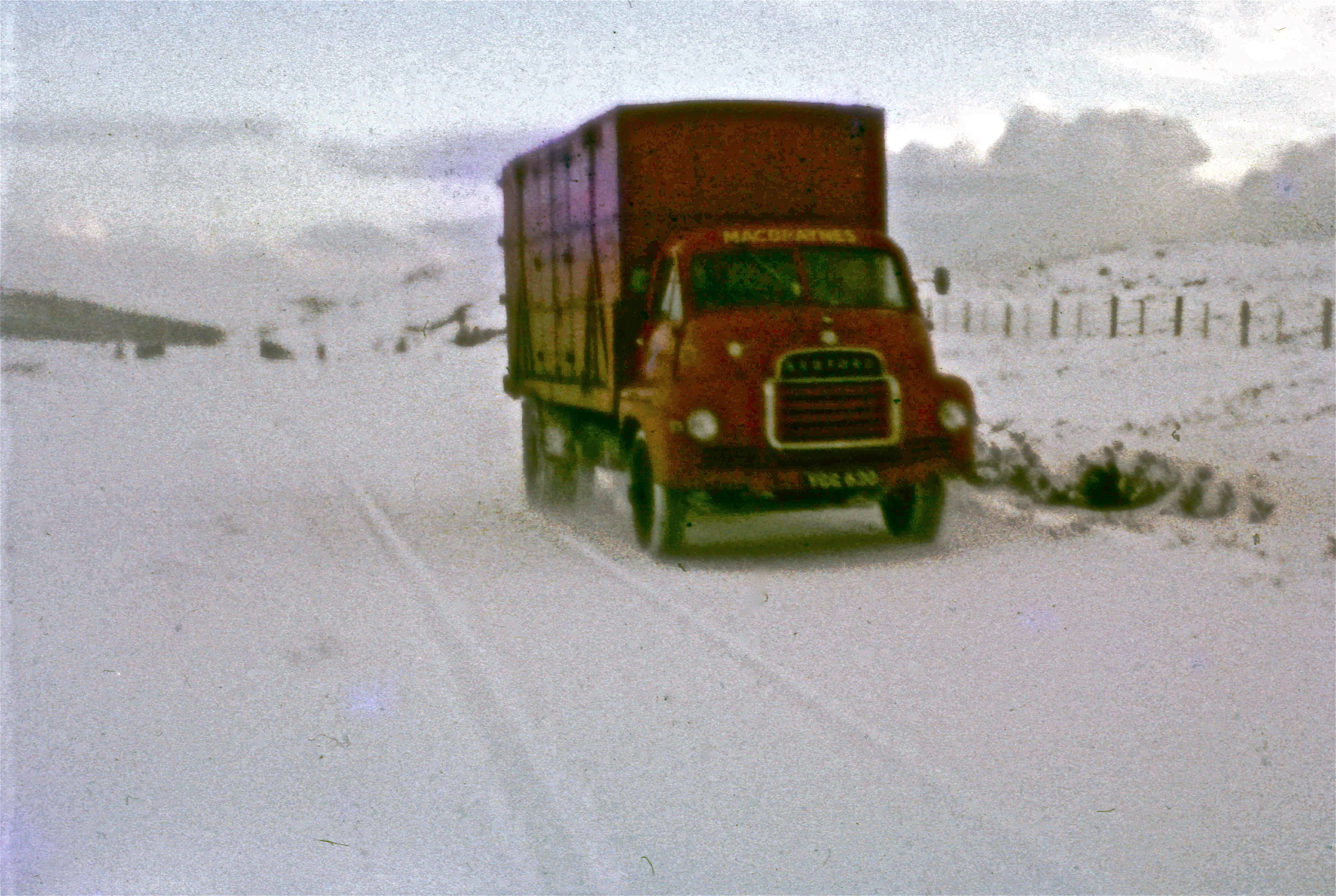
MacBrayne Bedford S-type lorry in snow south of Portree, 3 April 1968

In July 1969, Coast Line's 50% shareholding passed into state ownership, the company becoming a wholly nationalised subsidiary within the Scottish Transport Group. It was then decided to split MacBraynes shipping, road haulage and bus divisions into separate undertakings. The company's bus and coach services were transferred to the Scottish Bus Group in stages during 1970–72. The Glasgow-based coach tours passed to Alexander (Midland), the Ardrishaig depot including the Glasgow-Campbeltown and Ardrishaig-Oban routes passed to Western SMT, but the bulk of the bus operations passed to Highland Omnibuses (as did Alexander (Midland)'s Oban depot). Highland divested itself of some of the most peripheral routes within a few years, including all of the island operations except those on Skye. The road haulage division became MacBrayne Haulage Ltd., which was privatised and absorbed by Kilcionan Transport in 1985.

On 1 January 1973 the Scottish Transport Group's other shipping company, the Clyde-based Caledonian Steam Packet Company Ltd., acquired most of the ships and routes of David MacBrayne Ltd., and commenced joint Clyde and West Highland operations under the new name of Caledonian MacBrayne, with a combined headquarters at Gourock.

== Reactivation ==
After lying dormant for a number of years, the David MacBrayne Ltd. company was reactivated in 2006 by Scottish Ministers to act as the holding company for state-owned ferry operators. Scottish Ministers are the sole shareholder of the group, and all subsidiaries are private companies. The company is now categorised as an Executive Non Departmental Public Body (ENDPB) of the Scottish Government.

The group consisted of ferry operators CalMac Ferries Ltd, which (as Caledonian MacBrayne) operates the Clyde and Hebrides services and NorthLink Ferries Ltd, the former operator of the Aberdeen - Kirkwall - Lerwick and Scrabster - Stromness services. In 2011, newly created operator Argyll Ferries Ltd, which operated the Dunoon - Gourock passenger service was added to the group. In May 2012, NorthLink Ferries Ltd lost the Northern Isles ferry service contract to Serco. From 21 January 2019 the Argyll Ferries service was transferred into the existing Caledonian MacBrayne Clyde and Hebrides Ferry Service contract.

The vessels and some of the piers used by the ferry operators are owned by Caledonian Maritime Assets (CMAL), which is also owned by the Scottish Government. CMAL leases its vessels and piers to the operating companies for the duration of the contracts. The ships are chartered to the relevant ferry operators, and the piers and harbours operated under fairly standard berthing charges.

== Ships of David MacBrayne ==
MacBrayne ships featured red funnels with a black top. One of the best known was RMS Columba, MacBrayne's flagship from 1879 to 1935. She was an early steel-hulled 301-foot vessel, built by J & G Thomson in 1878, and was the largest and most luxurious Clyde steamer of the day; she operated the Glasgow to Ardrishaig service as part of MacBrayne's "Royal Route" to Oban. Her successor on the route, SS St Columba was the largest Turbine Steamer built for service on the Clyde and remains the only three-funnelled steamer ever to have served on the river.

=== List of ships operated by the company ===
Type	Name	Built	Launched	Tonnage (GRT)	Operated	Notes
PS	Curlew	David Napier, Glasgow	1836	82	1851-1854	From G & J Burns. Built as Loch Lomond, scrapped in 1862.
PS	Shandon	John Wood & Co., Port Glasgow	1839	165	1851-1853	From Thomson & MacConnell City of Glasgow Steam Packet Co. Served Australia, Hong Kong and China after Hutchesons. Scrapped in 1865.
PS	Duntroon Castle	Anderson & Gilmour, Glasgow	1842	217	1851-1853	From G & J Burns. Wrecked on Barbuda Island, Caribbean in 1863.
PS	Dolphin (I)	Robert Napier, Govan	27 July 1844	238	1851-1862	From G & J Burns. Sold for blockade running, trace lost after 1866.
PS	Pioneer (I)	Barr & MacNab, Paisley	25 June 1844	197	1851-1893	From G & J Burns. Withdrawn in 1893, scrapped in 1895.
PS	Edinburgh Castle	Smith & Rodger, Broomielaw	1844	114 (in 1844); 123 (in 1875)	1851-1927	From G & J Burns. Lengthened and renamed Glengarry in 1875. Scrapped in 1927.
HDB	Maid of Perth		c1840		1851-1866	From G & J Burns. Horse drawn track boat for Crinan Canal.
HDB	Sunbeam		c1840		1851-1866	From G & J Burns. Horse drawn track boat for Crinan Canal. Queen Victoria sailed on her in 1847 along the 'Royal Route'.
PS	Lapwing (I)	John Reid & Co, Port Glasgow	Aug 1848	101	1851-1859	From G & J Burns. Collided with the Islesman then foundered off Campbeltown on 21 February 1859, two lives were lost.
PS	Cygnet (I)	John Reid & Co, Port Glasgow	1848	101	1851-1882	From G & J Burns. Ran aground then wrecked in Loch Ailort.
PS	Mountaineer (I)	James & George Thomson, Govan	29 May 1852	190	1852-1889	Stranded on Lady rock, off Oban on 29 September 1889 and wrecked by bad weather, later broke in two.
PS	Chevalier (I)	James & George Thomson, Govan	24 Mar 1853	329	1853-1854	Ran aground in the Sound of Jura on 24 November 1854. Wreck sold at auction for £135.
PS	Islay (I)	Tod & MacGregor, Glasgow	4 Sept 1849	325	1854-1855; Feb-July 1868	Chartered to Hutchesons 1854 - 1855. Renamed PS Dolphin (II) in 1868. British registry closed in 1879.
PS	Iona (I)	James & George Thomson, Govan	22 Mar 1855	325	1855-1862	Sold for blockade running in US for Confederates, on transit she sank off Gourock after collision with Chanticleer on 2 October 1862.
PS	Clansman (I)	James & George Thomson, Govan	16 June 1855	414	1855-1869	Ran aground on 21 July 1869 then wrecked off the coast of Sanda, near Mull of Kintyre, in thick fog.
PS	Inveraray Castle	Tod & MacGregor, Glasgow	1839	208 (in 1839); 230 (in 1873)	1857-1889	Lengthened in 1862 and 1873. Withdrawn in 1889, scrapped in 1895.
PS	Mary Jane	Tod & MacGregor, Glasgow	1846	120 (in 1846); 226 (in 1875)	1857-1931	Lengthened and renamed Glencoe in 1875. In 1931, she towed MV Lochearn and MV Lochmor off a sandbank at Kyle of Lochalsh, after both of them grounded on the same bank after one tried to assist the other. Thought to be the oldest working and longest serving paddle steamer on Scotland's west coast at 85 years when scrapped in 1931.
PS	Stork	William Denny & Brothers Ltd, Dumbarton	1851	432	1857-1860	From G & J Burns. Sold to Italian Government in 1861.
PS	Duke of Argyll	Scott & Sons, Greenock	1852	256	1857-1858	Sank in Sound of Mull on 12 January 1858, subsequently beached then towed to the Clyde.
PS	Maid of Lorn	Thomas Wingate & Co., Glasgow	1 Aug 1849	120	1858; 1859-1883	Sold in 1858 and repurchased in 1859. Renamed PS Plover (I) in 1859. Hulked at Gareloch in 1883 and sold for scrapping in 1891.
SS	Fingal (I)	James & George Thomson, Govan	8 May 1861	462	June - Sept 1861	Only lasted 4 months in service before being sold to the confederates, the first to have managed to cross the Atlantic. Sank off Cape Hatteras, loaded with munitions, on 8 December 1869.
PS	Fairy	James & George Thomson, Govan	1861	151	1861-1863	Too great capacity for the Caledonian Canal, therefore sold to confederates in 1864.
SS	Clydesdale (I)	James & George Thomson, Govan	23 Apr 1862	403	1862-1905	Ran aground on Lady Rock near Oban, on her voyage from Oban to Barra on 13 January 1905, passengers taken onboard PS Carabinier enroute from Tobermory to Oban. She was later scrapped.
PS	Iona (II)	James & George Thomson, Govan	1863	368	1863-1864	Sank off Lundy Island in severe weather enroute to Nassau for fitting out for blockade running for confederates.
SS	Staffa (I)	James & George Thomson, Govan	June 1863	272	1863-1886	Wrecked off the coast of Gigha on August 1886.
PS	Iona (III)	James & George Thomson, Govan	10 May 1864	395	1864-1936	Scrapped at Dalmuir in 1936. Used much of the same interior and decks of her predecessors.
PS	Chevalier (II)	James & George Thomson, Govan	12 Apr 1866	292	1866-1927	Stranded on Barmore Island, near Tarbert (Loch Fyne), enroute to Ardrishaig, on 25 March 1927.
SS	Linnet	James & George Thomson, Govan	1866	33	1866-1929	Sold for use as a yacht clubhouse on Gareloch. Sunk in storm in Gareloch in January 1932.
PS	Gondolier	James & George Thomson, Govan	3 May 1866	169	1866-1939	In navy from 1939 to 1940, scuttled in Scapa Flow, Orkney.
SS	Clansman (II)	James & George Thomson, Govan	28 Apr 1870	618	1870-1910	She hit and grounded on Seal rock on 14 August 1888, investigation linked. Register closed in 1910.
SS	Queen of the Lake (I)		1863		1875-1882	
PS	Islay (II)	Barclay, Curle & Co. Ltd., Glasgow	1867	360 (in 1867); 401 (in 1882)	1875-1890	Lengthened in 1882. Wrecked, near Red Bay, County Antrim, on voyage from Portrush to Islay.
SS	Lochawe (I)	A. & J. Inglis Ltd., Glasgow	1876	97	1876-1924	Scrapped.
SS	Lochiel (I)	A. & J. Inglis Ltd., Glasgow	30 Apr 1877	262	1877-1907	Ran ashore near Portree then scrapped in 1907.
SS	Fingal (II)	A. & J. Inglis Ltd., Glasgow	6 Aug 1877	123	1877-1917	Launched as SS Lochness, but changed while fitting out. Foundered on 1 September 1917 enroute from Fleetwood to Kinsale.
PS	Columba (I)	James & George Thomson, Clydebank	9 Apr 1878	543	1878-1936	Scrapped at Dalmuir.
SS	Claymore (I)	James & George Thomson, Clydebank	1881	726	1881-1931	Scrapped at Bo’ness.
SS	Cavalier	Aitken & Mansel, Glasgow	1883	369	1883-1919	Scrapped in Port Glasgow in 1926. Sold to North of Scotland, Orkney & Shetland Co Ltd, renamed Fetlar. First clyde ship with electric lighting.
PS	Lochness (I)	Barr & MacNab, Renfrew	1853	121	1885-1912	Built as Loch goil, renamed Lough Foyle in 1871.
SS	Ethel	Workman, Clark & Co Ltd	1880	287	1885-1916	Renamed SS Clansman (III) in 1910. Foundered off Haisborough, enroute from Hull to Yarmouth in 1924.
PS	Grenadier	James & George Thomson, Clydebank	1885	321	1885-1927	In navy from 1916 to 1919 as HMS Grenade. While approaching Oban bay it caught fire and then sank.
PS	Gladiator	Matthew Pearse & Co, Stockton-on-Tees	1860	592	1887-1893	Wrecked near Cadiz, Spain on passage to Mauritius from Liverpool with sugar. Originally built for T & J Harrison of Liverpool.
SS	Countess of Kellie	Alexander Stephen & Sons Ltd, Kelvinhaugh	1870	68	1887-1904	Originally built for Caledonian Railway. Reduced to hulk in 1934.
SS	Handa	Blackwood & Gordon, Port Glasgow	1878	146	1887-1917	Built as Aros Castle. Sold for scrapping, but never reached the yard, foundered in severe weather on Christmas Eve.
SS	Mabel		1882	30	1887-1911	Laid up at Loch Maree.
PS	Pelican	Ebenezer Pike, Cork	1850	561	1888-1895	Wrecked near Tobermory.
PS	Falcon	Ebenezer Pike, Cork	1854	613	1888-1890	Wrecked in Atlantic Ocean enroute to the US.
SS	Staffa (II)	William Simons & Co. Ltd., Renfrew	1861	211	1888-1909	Built as Adela. Scrapped.
SS	Udea	Schlesinger, Davis & Co, Newcaslte	1873	157	1888-1894	Wrecked of the coast of Gigha at Cath Sgier with the cargo of coal and iron.
PS	Fusilier	J. McArthur & Co, Paisley	1888	251	1888-1934	Scrapped at Barrow-in-Furness in 1839.
SS	Loanda	John Elder & Co., Govan	1870	1475	1889-1897	Scrapped in 1897.
PS	Margaret	Cumming & Swan, Glasgow	1875	33	1889-1892	Register closed due to being wrecked.
SS	Flowerdale	Barrow Shipbulding Co Ltd, Barrow-in-Furness	1878	539	1889-1904	Wrecked then Scrapped at Bowling, Glasgow.
SS	Texa	Scott & Co, Bowling	1884	186	1889-1917	Wrecked near Ballyshannon.
SS	Maud	T. B. Seath & Co., Rutherglen	1888	10	1889-1897	Steam launch, chartered from 1889 - 1893.
PS	Hero	Thomas Wingate & Co., Glasgow	1858	157	1890-1909	Renamed PS Mountaineer (II) in 1892 to do summer excursions from Oban.
PS	Islay (III)	Tod & MacGregor, Glasgow	1872	497	1890-1902	Built as Princess Louise for Larne & Stranraer Steamboat Co. Wrecked on route between Glasgow and Port Ellen with passengers and cargo saved.
PS	Cygnus	James Henderson & Son, Renfrew	1854	264	1891-1896	Renamed PS Brigadier in 1892. Wrecked near Rodel, Harris.
PS	Lovedale	William Simons & Co. Ltd., Renfrew	1867	458	1891-1904	Built as Great Western, scrapped.
PS	Gael	Robertson & Co, Greenock	1867	361	1891-1924	Scrapped.
PS	Carabinier	Oswald, Mordaunt & Co, Southampton	1878	299	1893-1908	Scrapped at Troon.
PS	Ardmore	Barclay, Curle & Co. Ltd., Glasgow	1861	142	1894-1919	Built as Sultan, renamed Gairlochy in 1895. Destroyed by fire at Fort Augustus, then sank.
SS	Hibernian	Henry Murray & Co, Port Glasgow	1875	334	1894	Collided with the SS Prince of Wales of Isle of Man Steam Packet Co near the Isle of Man and almost immediately sank.
PS	Glendale	John Elder & Co., Govan	1875	491	1902-1905	Built as Paris. Wrecked off the Mull of Kintyre due to confusion between the Sanda and Mull of Kintyre lights.
SS	Lapwing (II)	Scott & Sons, Bowling	1903	211	1903-1918	Scrapped in 1931. Government service 1918 - 1920 sailing Penzance - Scilly and Plymouth - Channel islands.
SS	Sheila	A. & J. Inglis Ltd., Glasgow	1904	263	1904-1927	Ran aground and sank off Loch Torridon.
SS	Brenda	Scott & Sons, Bowling	1904	115	1904-1930	Scrapped at Troon.
SS	Cygnet (II)	A. & J. Inglis Ltd., Glasgow	1904	191	1904-1930	Scrapped at Barrow in 1931. Got the starboard engine and boiler from the wrecked SS Flowerdale.
SS	Plover (II)	Scott & Sons, Bowling	1904	208	1904-1946	Submarine surfaced near it when it was close to Tiree in 1918, passengers made to shore on lifeboats, no casualties. Renamed and refitted as SS Loch Aline in 1934. Scrapped in Llanelly in 1951. Got the port engine and boiler from the wrecked SS Flowerdale.
PS	Pioneer (II)	A. & J. Inglis Ltd., Glasgow	1905	241	1905-1944	Scrapped at Rotterdam in 1958.
SS	Clydesdale (II)	Scott & Sons, Bowling	1905	394	1905-1953	Scrapped at Port Glasgow in 1953.
MV	Comet	A. W. Robertson & Co. Ltd., London	1905	43	1907-1947	Built as MV Win. First motor vessel in the fleet. Now houseboat at Shoreham named Gradley.
MV	Scout	Ailsa Shipbuilding Co. Ltd., Troon	1907	82	1907-1913	Beached near Ballachulish, Loch Leven after a fire due to an engine issue in 1913, total loss.
SS	Chieftain (I)	Ailsa Shipbuilding Co, Ayr	1907	1088	1907-1919	Sold to North of Scotland, Orkney & Shetland Co Ltd, renamed St Margaret. Scrapped at La Spezia in 1952.
SS	Nellie	John H. Gilmour & Co, Irvine	1892	89	1908-1916	Renamed Staffa (III) in 1910. Wrecked in storm near Alderney in 1942.
SS	Lochiel (II)	Scott & Sons, Bowling	1908	241	1908-1917	In navy from 1917 until 1918 when wrecked on east side of England.
MV	Lochinvar (I)	Scott & Sons, Bowling	1908	216	1908-1960	Triple-screw, after WW2 changed to twin-screw with 1 less engine. In 1966 she ran ashore as Anzio 1 at Donna Nook and lost her entire 13 crew including some of the new owners.
SS	Dirk	Scott & Sons, Bowling	1909	181	1909-1915	In navy from 1915 until 1918 when wrecked on east side of England after explosion.
PS	Mountaineer (III)	A. & J. Inglis Ltd., Glasgow	1910	235	1910-1938	Scrapped at Port Glasgow.
SS	Loch Leven Queen	Russell & Co, Port Glasgow	1896	82	1911-1929	Renamed Lochness (II) in 1912. Scrapped in Charlestown in 1929.
SS	Duke of Abercorn	Grangemouth Dockyard Company	1888	144	1914-1915	Built as Britannia. Laid up with boiler trouble in 1914, register closed in 1915.
PS	Countess of Mayo	T. B. Seath & Co., Rutherglen	1897	46	1914-1917	Scrapped on the River Tyne in 1953.
SS	Devonia	Scott of Kinghorn Ltd, Kinghorn	1906	318	1919-1938	Renamed Lochiel (III) in 1920. Capsized and sank at Port Said in 1952 as Monte Lirio, scrapped on site.
SS	Cameo	Fullerton & Co, Paisley	1883	338	1927	Chartered. Struck rocks and sank near Torre Annunziata in 1939.
SS	Welshman	Murdoch & Murray, Port Glasgow	1893	361	1927	Chartered. Built as Maggie Barr. Scrapped at Port Glasgow.
SS	Lochdunvegan (I)	Caird & Company, Greenock	1891	411	1929-1948	Built as Grouse. Scrapped at Faslane in 1948.
SS	Lochness (III)	Harland & Wolff, Govan	1929	777	1929-1955	Scrapped at Perama in 1973.
MV	Loch Shiel (I)	H. Robb Ltd, Leith	1929	208	1929-1970	Foundered off Arran.
MV	Lochearn	Ardrossan Dockyard Ltd, Ardrossan	1930	542	1930-1964	See MV Lochmor (I) below. Scrapped in 1975.
MV	Lochmor (I)	Ardrossan Dockyard Ltd, Ardrossan	1930	542	1930-1964	Grounded on a sandbank at Kyle of Lochalsh in 1931, MV Lochearn came to help and grounded on the same bank as well, PS Glencoe ended up towing the two of them off the bank. Scrapped in 1984.
SS	Loch Broom (I)	John Elder & Co., Govan	1871	977	1931-1937	Built as City of London. Scrapped at Port Glasgow in 1937.
FB	Mingary				1931-1963	
DEMV	Lochfyne (I)	William Denny & Brothers Ltd, Dumbarton	1931	754	1931-1970	First diesel electric passenger ship in UK. Starboard diesel engine exploded in Oban bay in July 1939, returned to service March 1940. Scrapped at Dalmuir in 1974.
FB	Staffa (IV)				1932-1939	
FB	Dumb Barge No 1				1932-1948	Rodel rowing boat tender
FB	Kyle				1933-1941	
FB	Glenelg				1933-1948	
FB	Soay				1933-1955	
FB	Dumb Barge No 2				1933-1956	Stockinish rowing boat tender
FB	Fingal (III)				1933-1961	
DEMV	Lochnevis (I)	William Denny & Brothers Ltd, Dumbarton	1934	568	1934-1970	Scrapped in Wormer, Netherlands in 1974.
SS	Princess Louise	Ritchie, Graham & Milne, Glasgow	1898	106	1935-1939	In navy from 1939 until 1941 when lost in air raid in Greenock harbour.
TS	Saint Columba	William Denny & Brothers Ltd, Dumbarton	1912	785	1935-1958	Built as Queen Alexandra, renamed HMS Columba from 1941 to 1945. Scrapped at Port Glasgow in 1958.
TS	King George V	William Denny & Brothers Ltd, Dumbarton	1926	815	1935-1975	Transferred to CalMac during merger with CSPC. Got 2 lifeboats from MV Scout, which had been destroyed by a fire, were previously on PS Columba. Scrapped at Briton Ferry in 1984.
SS	Lochgorm (II)	Blackwood & Gordon, Port Glasgow	1896	668	1936-1951	Built as Lily. Scrapped at Port Glasgow in 1951.
SS	Lochgarry	A. & J. Inglis Ltd., Glasgow	1898	1280	1937-1942	Built as Vulture. Acted as a boom defence vessel during WW2, wrecked off Rathlin island, enroute from Glasgow to Oban. Assisted in evacuation of Dunkirk.
FB	Garry	Hugh McLean & Sons Ltd, Govan	1937		1937-1969	Sold to a private owner in Acharacle.
MV	Lochiel (IV)	William Denny & Brothers Ltd, Dumbarton	1939	603	1939-1970	Scrapped at Bristol in 1995.
SS	Hebrides (I)	Ailsa Shipbuilding, Troon	1898	585	1939-1945; 1948-1955	Chartered from McCallum, Orme & Co during WW2. Assisted to evacuate residents of Soay and St Kilda. Scrapped at Port Glasgow in 1955.
MV	Loch Nell	James A Silver Lyd, Roseneath	1941	31	1947-1981	Ex hospital launch. Transferred to CalMac during merger with CSPC. Used as a yacht and houseboat after CalMac, and has been in a boatyard at Faversham since 2012.
MV	Loch Seaforth (I)	William Denny & Brothers Ltd, Dumbarton	1947	1090	1947-1973	Grounded then sank in Gunna Sound, between Coll and Tiree, she was then refloated and taken to the pier at Gott Bay and sank again. Only ship in CalMac history to have been written off in active passenger service. Ferries couldn't berth at Tiree therefore everything had to be tendered ashore.
SS	Dunara Castle	Blackwood & Gordon, Port Glasgow	1875	423	1948	Ex McCallum, Orme & Co vessel, operated for MacBrayne's less than 1 month. Scrapped at Glasgow in 1948. Evacuated last residents of St Kilda in 1930.
SS	Challenger	Hall, Russell & Co Ltd, Aberdeen	1897	143	1948	Converted from a fishing vessel. Ex McCallum, Orme & Co vessel. Scrapped at Faslane in 1948.
MV	Loch Broom (II)	Scott & Sons Ltd, Bowling	1945	325	1948-1972	Wrecked in 1974 after running aground on Andros Island, Greece.
FB	Janet B	Eyemouth	1905	40	1948-1949	Ex McCallum Orme Ltd vessel.
FB	Arinagour				1948-1949	Ex McCallum Orme Ltd vessel.
FB	Nora				1948-1949	Ex McCallum Orme Ltd vessel.
FB	Glassard				1948-1949	Ex McCallum Orme Ltd vessel.
FB	Eriskay (I)				1948-1951	Ex McCallum Orme Ltd vessel.
FB	Marne				1948-1967	
FB	Kallin				1948-1968	
FB	Dumb Barge No 3		1946		1949-1956	Old lifeboat from SS Loch Frisa.
SS	Loch Frisa (I)	Morton Engineering & Drydock Co., Quebec	1946	519	1949-1963	Last steamer bought by MacBrayne's. Foundered off Italy in 1979.
MV	Lochbuie (II)		1949	33	1949-1968	
FB	Craignure		1904		1950-1964; 1973-1979	Bought again by CalMac in 1973.
MV	Loch Dunvegan (II)	Akt. Lindholmens Varv, Gothenburg	1946	562	1950-1973	Hull strengthened for ice breaking. Last known to be in service in 1994.
FB	Iona (V)	J Barr & Son (Craigendoran) Ltd, Dumbarton	1950	15	1950-1961	Wrecked in September 1961 in aftermath of a hurricane.
FB	Staffa (I)	J Barr & Son (Craigendoran) Ltd, Dumbarton	1950	15	1950-1967	
FB	Coll (I)	J Barr & Sons (Craigendoran) Ltd, Dumbarton	1951	15	1951-1967	Sold on completion of Coll pier in 1967 to a man from Tobermory.
FB	Colonsay	J Barr & Sons (Craigendoran) Ltd, Dumbarton	1951	15	1951-1969	Renamed FB Eriskay (II) in 1965. Sold to a man from Berneray in 1969.
MV	Loch Carron	Ardrossan Dockyard Ltd, Ardrossan	1951	683	1951-1976	Transferred to CalMac during merger with CSPC. Register closed in 2012.
FB	Lochshiel (II)	J Barr & Sons (Craigendoran) Ltd, Dumbarton	1951	16	1953-1970	Collision with unidentified vessel and sank off Toward while enroute from Ardrishaig to Gareloch for overhaul.
FB	Lochailort	J Barr & Sons (Craigendoran) Ltd, Dumbarton	1954	14	1954-1969	Burnt as her wooden hull was becoming rotten at Kyle of Lochalsh.
MV	Loch Toscaig	J. Bolson & Company Ltd, Poole	1945	49	1955-1975	Transferred to CalMac during merger with CSPC. Sold in 1975 for private use for fishing, she sank at her moorings at Gourock in 1978, finally scrapped in 1986.
MV	Loch Ard	Ferguson Brothers (Port Glasgow) Ltd	1955	611	1955-1971	Sank off Tunisia on 7 May 1984, all crew saved, scrapped in 1985.
MV	Claymore (II)	William Denny & Brothers Ltd, Dumbarton	1955	1021	1955-1976	Transferred to CalMac during merger with CSPC. Foundered whilst laid up in Eleusis Bay, Greece as City of Hydra in 2000.
FB	Ulva	Timbacraft Ltd, Shandon	1956		1956-2001	Transferred to CalMac during merger with CSPC. Sold, engine reused for another purpose, hull scrapped.
MV	Loch Arkaig	J. Bolson & Company Ltd, Poole	1942	179	1960-1979	Transferred to CalMac during merger with CSPC. Built as a wooden hulled inshore minesweeper. Could take 1 car on top of her bridge. Sunk near Cadiz during trials in 1985.
MV	Loch Eynort	Wivenhoe Shipyard Ltd, Wivenhoe	1947	117	1961-1971	Worked as an Irish pilot boat before CalMac, used as a yacht afterward, renamed Skellig. Little service between 1964 and 1971, normally laid up at Gareloch.
FB	Iona (VI)	Timbacraft Ltd, Shandon	1962		1962-1988	Transferred to CalMac during merger with CSPC. Scrapped due to woodworm, engine kept for spares.
FB	Applecross		1944		1963-1969; 1973-1985	Bought again by CalMac. Sold for private use.
MV	Hebrides (II)	Hall, Russell & Co Ltd, Aberdeen	1963	1420	1963-1985	Transferred to CalMac during merger with CSPC. Scrapped at Aliaga, Turkey in 2003.
MV	Clansman (IV)	Hall, Russell & Co Ltd, Aberdeen	1964	1420 (in 1964); 1705 (in 1972)	1964-1984	Transferred to CalMac during merger with CSPC. Rebuilt in Troon in 1972 to drive through with bow visor, lengthened and lifted the height of the car deck. Wrecked off Port Sudan in 1994 in position 19 22' 35.87"N, 37 18' 56.11”E.
MV	Columba (II)	Hall, Russell & Co Ltd, Aberdeen	1964	1420 (in 1964); 2112 (in 1994)	1964-1989	Transferred to CalMac during merger with CSPC. Sold for use as a luxury cruise ship named Hebridean Princess in 1989, her hoist and side ramps were removed in 1992. Queen Elizabeth had chartered her several times.
MV	Scalpay (I)	James Noble Ltd, Fraserburgh	1956	10	1965-1971	Built as Maid of Glencoe. Scrapped in 1971.
FB	Eigg (I)	Harland & Wolff, Belfast	1923		1966-1978	Transferred to CalMac during merger with CSPC. Converted lifeboat from P&O Mooltan when she was decommissioned in 1954.
MV	Iona (VII)	Ailsa shipbuilding company, Troon	1970	1192	1970-1997	Transferred to CalMac during merger with CSPC. Sold to Pentland Ferries and renamed Pentalina-B. Wrecked near Moia Moia, Cape Verde in June 2014 at position 15°1′26″N 23°26′21.5″W.
MV	Scalpay (II)	Ailsa shipbuilding company, Troon	1957	60	1971-1979	Bought from CSPC, renamed from Lochalsh (II). Transferred to CalMac during merger with CSPC.
MV	Largs	Ailsa shipbuilding company, Troon	1960	60	1972-1983	Bought from CSPC, renamed from Kyleakin (II). Transferred to CalMac during merger with CSPC.
MV	Morvern	James Lamont, Port Glasgow	1972	65	1972-1995	Transferred to CalMac during merger with CSPC. Still in service for Arranmore Ferries.
