= PS Gondolier =

Clyde-built paddle steamer (1866-1939)

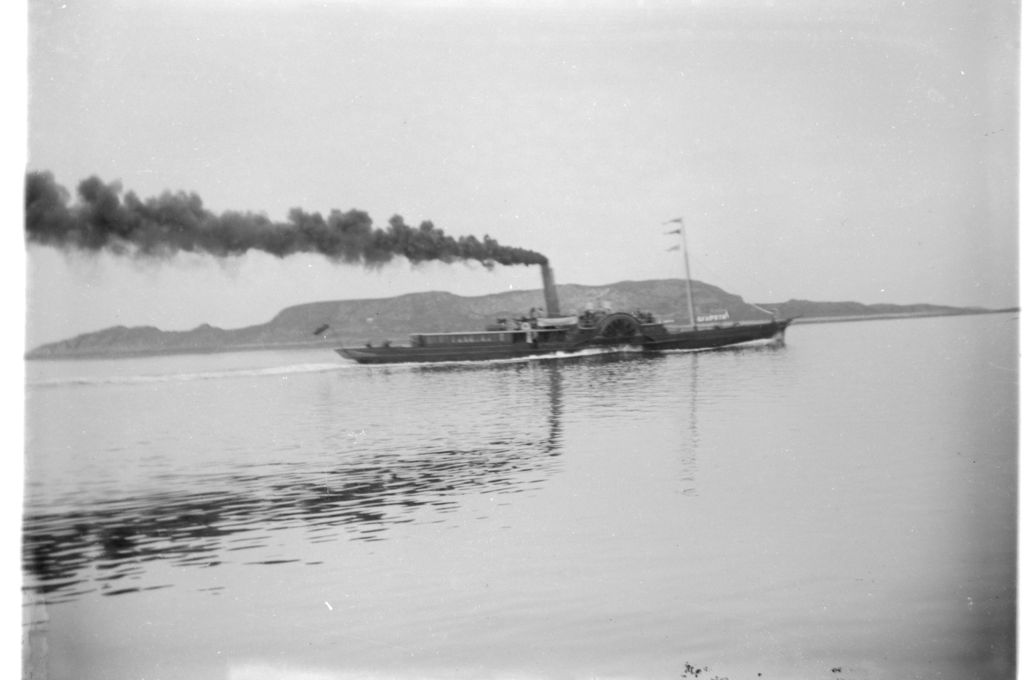
- PS Gondolier steaming past Lismore Island

History

United Kingdom
- Name: Gondolier
- Owner: Hutcheson and MacBrayne, Glasgow
- Operator: David MacBrayne
- Port of registry: Glasgow
- Route: Inverness - Banavie (Caledonian Canal); 1866–1939
- Builder: James & George Thomson, Govan, Glasgow
- Launched: 3 May 1866
- In service: 11 July 1866
- Out of service: 1939
- Fate: Blockship at Scapa Flow, 1940

General characteristics
- Type: Passenger & cargo vessel
- Tonnage: 169 GRT
- Length: 45.17 m (148 ft 2 in)
- Beam: 6.15 m (20 ft 2 in)
- Draught: 2.37 m (7 ft 9 in)
- Capacity: 700

PS Gondolier was a Scottish paddle steamer built in 1866 by J & G Thomson of Govan, Glasgow. Designed for service on the Caledonian Canal, she operated for over seventy years, primarily on the route between Inverness and Banavie. The vessel was commissioned by a partnership including David and Alexander Hutcheson and David MacBrayne, and was later operated by David MacBrayne Ltd.

== Design and construction ==
Gondolier was a passenger and cargo ship constructed with an iron hull and powered by a two-cylinder oscillating steam engine turning paddle wheels. She could carry up to 700 passengers. She was specifically designed to navigate the narrow locks and shallow waters of the Caledonian Canal, a major inland waterway in the Scottish Highlands. The canal, completed in 1822 under the direction of engineer Thomas Telford, connected the east and west coasts of Scotland via a series of lochs and man-made channels.

== Service history ==
The vessel entered service in 1866 and maintained a regular schedule along the canal, initially three times a week, between Inverness and Banavie sailing on alternate days to another of the company's paddle steamers, PS Edinburgh Castle (later renamed PS Glengarry), which had been on the route since 1847. Initially operated by David Hutcheson & Co., she later came under the ownership of David MacBrayne Ltd., a company that played a central role in maritime transport around the Scottish Highlands and Islands.

On 16 September 1873, Gondolier was chartered for a trip along the canal from Banavie to Inverness by Queen Victoria.

In 1930, Gondolier was refitted with a haystack boiler salvaged from the decommissioned paddle steamer, Grenadier, replacing her original locomotive boilers. This upgrade extended her operational life until the outbreak of World War II. In 1935, she was given a new saloons with larger windows and in 1936, a deckhouse was added to her promenade deck.

== Wartime use and scuttling ==
At the end of the 1939 season, Gondolier was withdrawn from service and requisitioned by the Admiralty. Her engines, boiler, paddle boxes, and superstructure were removed, and the hull was transported to Scapa Flow in the Orkney Islands. There, she was scuttled as a blockship, part of a defensive measure to prevent enemy vessels from accessing the Royal Navy's anchorage during the war.
