= St Kilda, Britain's Loneliest Isle =

1928 film

- Directed by: Paul Robello; Bobbie Mann
- Production company: Topical Productions
- Release date: 1928
- Running time: 18 minutes
- Country: United Kingdom
- Language: Silent

St Kilda, Britain's Loneliest Isle (also known as Britain's Loneliest Isle) is a 1928 short silent documentary film directed by Paul Robello and Bobbie Mannabout. The film is about St Kilda, an isolated archipelago to the west of Scotland, and the final period of its habitation. The permanent population of St Kilda was evacuated in 1930.

== Scenario ==
Filmed primarily in 1923, it includes scenes and people on Hirta, the main island of the archipelago. The film shows the St Kilda men hunting fulmar on the cliff face.

== Production ==
In the 1920s, John McCallum & Co., the steamship company running a service between Glasgow and St Kilda, commissioned the film.

== Availability ==
The film is available for viewing on the National Library of Scotland website.

It was included as an extra on the 2004 DVD release of Michael Powell's The Edge of the World."

== Preservation status ==
In May 2010, the film was inscribed in UNESCO's UK Memory of the World Register.

== See also ==
- SS Hebrides
- The Edge of the World (1937)
