= King George V-class battleship =

King George V-class battleship may refer to:

- King George V-class battleship (1911), a class of four Royal Navy battleships that served in World War I
- King George V-class battleship (1939), a class of five Royal Navy battleships that served in World War II
