= MV Hebrides (1963) =

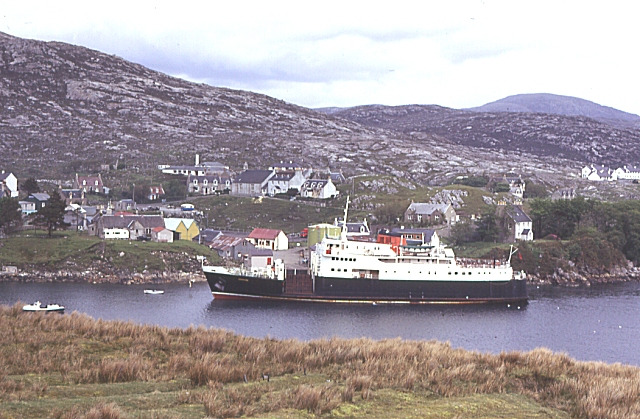
- Hebrides at Tarbert

History

United Kingdom
- Name: MV Hebrides; 1985: Devonian; 1994: Illyria
- Owner: Secretary of State for Scotland; October 1973: David MacBrayne Ltd; April 1974: Caledonian MacBrayne Holdings Ltd; 1980: Caledonian MacBrayne Ltd
- Operator: David MacBrayne Ltd
- Port of registry: Leith then Glasgow
- Route: Uig, Skye - Tarbert - Lochmaddy
- Builder: Hall, Russell & Company, Aberdeen; Engines: Crossley Bros Ltd, Manchester
- Cost: £2 million for the three ships
- Yard number: 910
- Launched: 20 November 1963
- In service: 15 April 1964
- Identification: Official Number: 305301; Callsign: GMOV
- Fate: Scrapped 2003

General characteristics
- Class & type: Hoist-loading vehicle ferry
- Tonnage: 2104 ton
- Length: 220 ft (67.1 m)
- Beam: 43 ft (13.1 m)
- Depth: 13 ft (4.0 m)
- Propulsion: Machinery: 2 x SCSA. each 8 cyls. 10 1/2 in × 13 1/2 in (270 mm × 340 mm)
- Speed: 14 kn (26 km/h)
- Capacity: 600 passengers and 50 cars

MV Hebrides was the first of a trio of hoist-loading car ferries built for David MacBrayne Ltd in 1964 and operated on the Uig, Skye to Tarbert and Lochmaddy route in Scotland for over twenty years. She is the only Calmac vessel to have crossed the Atlantic. In later years, as Illyria she sailed between Italy and Albania.

== History ==
The Secretary of State for Scotland ordered a trio of near-identical car ferries for the Western Isles. Hall, Russell & Company of Aberdeen won the contract to build them, ahead of fifteen other British yards. The new ferries were initially chartered to David MacBrayne Ltd, and were all equipped to serve as floating nuclear shelters, in the event of national emergency. This included vertical sliding watertight doors that could seal off the car deck, immediately aft of the hoist. Hebrides, the first of the trio, was launched on 20 November 1963, entered service on 15 April 1964 and served Calmac until 14 November 1985.

After a lay up, she was sold to Torbay Seaways, owners of her sister ship, Clansman. From 24 May 1986, for a couple of years, as Devonian, she ran between Torquay and the Channel Islands. In 1990 she was laid up in Ipswich. From 1993, as Illyria she sailed between Italy and Albania, initially between Brindisi and Valona, then in 1994, for Illyria Lines, between Bari and Durrës and later between Brindisi and Durrës. She still carried the Calmac lion on her funnel.

Later, she became the first MacBrayne vessel ever to cross the Atlantic, and in 1998, she was sailing out of Kingstown in St Vincent and the Grenadines. On 11 October 1999, the ship caught fire in Eleusis Bay, Greece. To prevent her from sinking, she was taken to shallower water. By April 2004, it was reported that the ship had been laid up in a damaged condition for some years, her future in serious doubt. Sold for demolition to Huzur Gemi Sokum Ltd., Turkey, she arrived in Aliağa under tow on 31 July 2003.

== Layout ==
Hebrides had several innovations, stabilisers and a bow-thrust propeller to assist with berthing. She was though, like her sisters not fitted with twin rudders aft of the screws, making the vessel slow to respond to the helm. Her car deck could take 50 cars. Hydraulic lifts and side-ramps allowed vehicles to drive on and off conventional piers at any state of tide. Vehicles were turned on the hoist platform and at the stern end of the vehicle deck, using 14-foot-diameter (4.3 m) manual turntables. The hoists avoided the cost of installing linkspans on the piers, but the process was slow and restricted the length and weight of vehicles that could be carried.

On the enclosed upper deck, there was a bright cafeteria /restaurant aft, with a substantial galley and pantry. Forward were a lounge-bar, a little shop and the pursers' office. Forward on the promenade deck was a well-fitted observation lounge, with comfortable armchairs. Here, in a special mahogany presentation stand, was the ship's bell from the original MacBrayne Hebrides, an 1898 steamer. There was ample open deck space aft of this lounge. The interiors of Hebrides, and her sisters Clansman and Columba, were designed by young Scottish interior designer, John McNeece. The funnel and two lifeboats stood on the boat deck, with the bridge forward. Hebrides had sleeping accommodation for 51 below the car deck.

== Service ==
Hebrides' new Uig-Tarbert-Lochmaddy service opened up car travel to the Western Isles. From 1964, she spent over twenty years on the route. On her introduction, the old Outer Isles mail steamer Lochmor ceased her crossings of the Minch, instead taking up the Armadale service from Mallaig, until the second new car ferry arrived.

Hebrides developed a reputation for reliability. Several times, she touched rocks in East Loch Tarbert. In July 1981, she lost her rudder there and had to retreat to the Clyde for repairs. Having served Harris faithfully for over twenty years, she was replaced by the larger and drive through vessel MV Hebridean Isles in 1985.
