= MV Claymore (1955) =

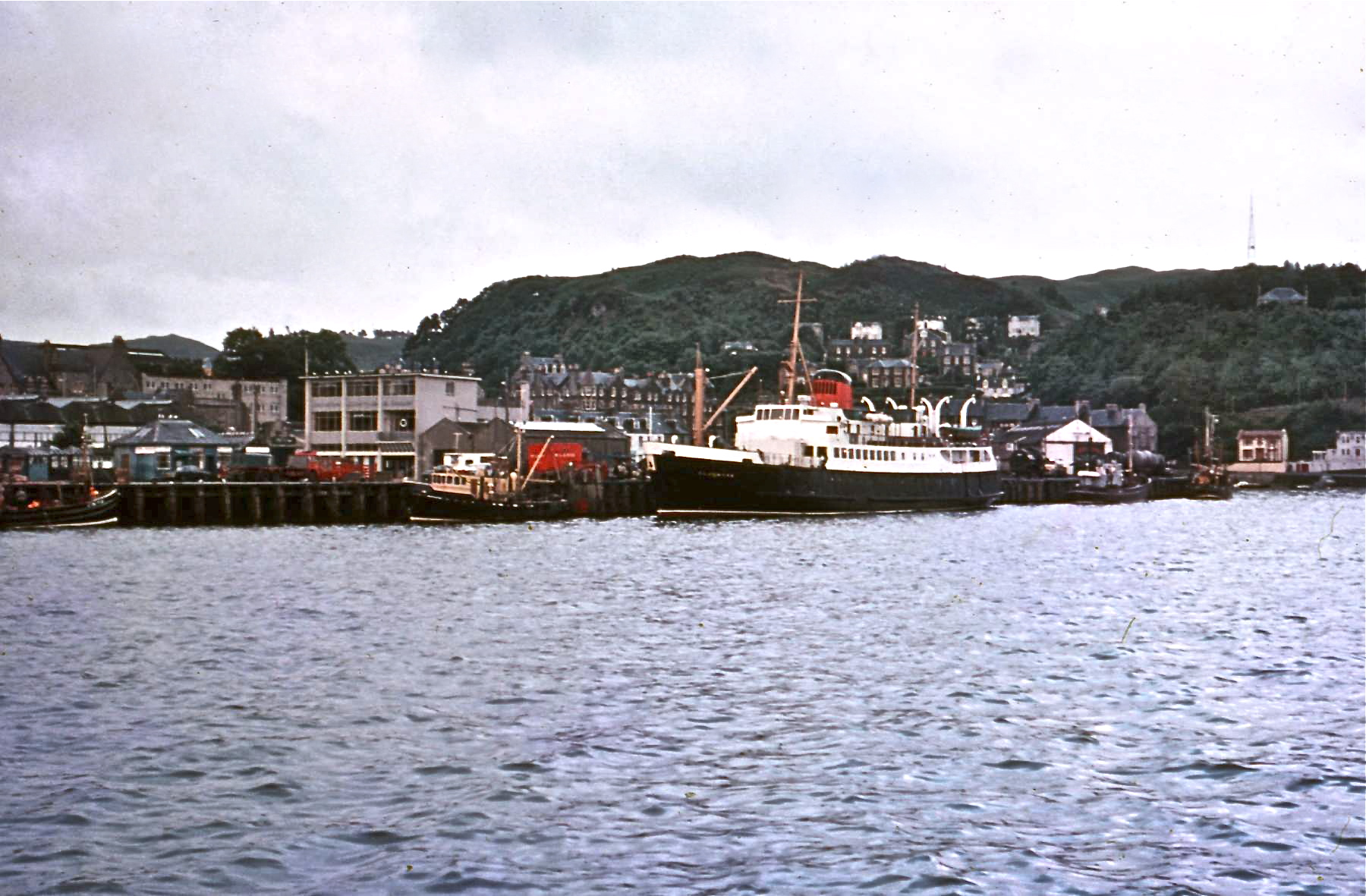
- RMS Claymore at Oban in 1970

History
- Name: Claymore; City of Andros; City of Hydra
- Owner: 1955: David MacBrayne; 1976: Cycladic Cruises
- Port of registry: 1955–1976: Glasgow, United Kingdom; 1976–2000: Piraeus, Greece
- Route: 1955–1972: Inner Isles mail from Oban; 1976–1993: Saronic Islands
- Builder: William Denny and Brothers, Dumbarton; Engine builder: Sulzer Bros. Ltd
- Yard number: 1482
- Launched: 10 March 1955
- Identification: IMO number: 5075799
- Fate: Sank at mooring at Eleusis 24 November 2000

General characteristics
- Type: Steel Double Screw Motor Vessel
- Tonnage: 1,024 GT
- Length: 185.4 ft (57 m) (original)
- Beam: 35 ft (10.7 m)
- Draft: 11.2 ft (3.4 m)
- Propulsion: 2 Oil SCSA each 8 cyls; 4TD36 airless injection 360 x 600 mm; 1,299 bhp
- Speed: 12 kts
- Capacity: 500 passengers

MV Claymore (II) was David MacBrayne's last mail boat built in 1955. She served on the Inner Isles Mail on the west coast of Scotland until 1972. Subsequently sold for day cruising in the Greek Islands until 1993, she sank at her mooring in 2000.

== History ==
Built by William Denny and Brothers of Dumbarton, Claymore was launched in 1955. She revived the name of an 1881 steamer, which had sailed for almost half a century between Glasgow and Stornoway. Claymore was the last major passenger vessel ordered by MacBraynes which was not a car ferry and entered service on the Inner Isles mail from Oban, replacing the elderly Lochearn. Thus also known as R.M.S. Claymore.

On merger, in 1973, Claymore remained registered to David MacBrayne Ltd and never adopted the Caledonian MacBrayne funnel.

In April 1976, she was sold to Canopus Shipping of Piraeus, and left Scotland on 10 May, as City of Andros, to join her ex-CSP consort City of Piraeus (ex-Maid of Argyll). After rebuilding in Greece, Claymore's name was changed again, to City of Hydra. She was withdrawn around 1993 and laid up at Eleusis. On 24 November 2000, she sank at her moorings and was subsequently scrapped.

== Layout ==
Claymore was a two-class vessel with passenger accommodation over three decks. The dining saloons on the main deck were divided by a mid-line sliding partition. The promenade deck had a first-class observation lounge and bar, a second-class open lounge, first-class staterooms and a hospital room. The lower deck had first- and second-class cubicles. Claymore could carrying 494 in all and had sleeping accommodation for 56 passengers, a big improvement on the 22 who could sleep on Lochearn.

Claymore had the latest navigational aids of the day, radar, Decca, an echo-sounder and wireless-telegraphy. A forward hold and 7.5 ton derrick allowed her to carry 100 tons of cargo and 26 head of cattle. Up to eleven cars could be lifted on board.

She underwent a substantial rebuild and lengthening for her service as a cruise ship in Greece, emerging complete with swimming pool, dramatically flared bows and painted silver all over.

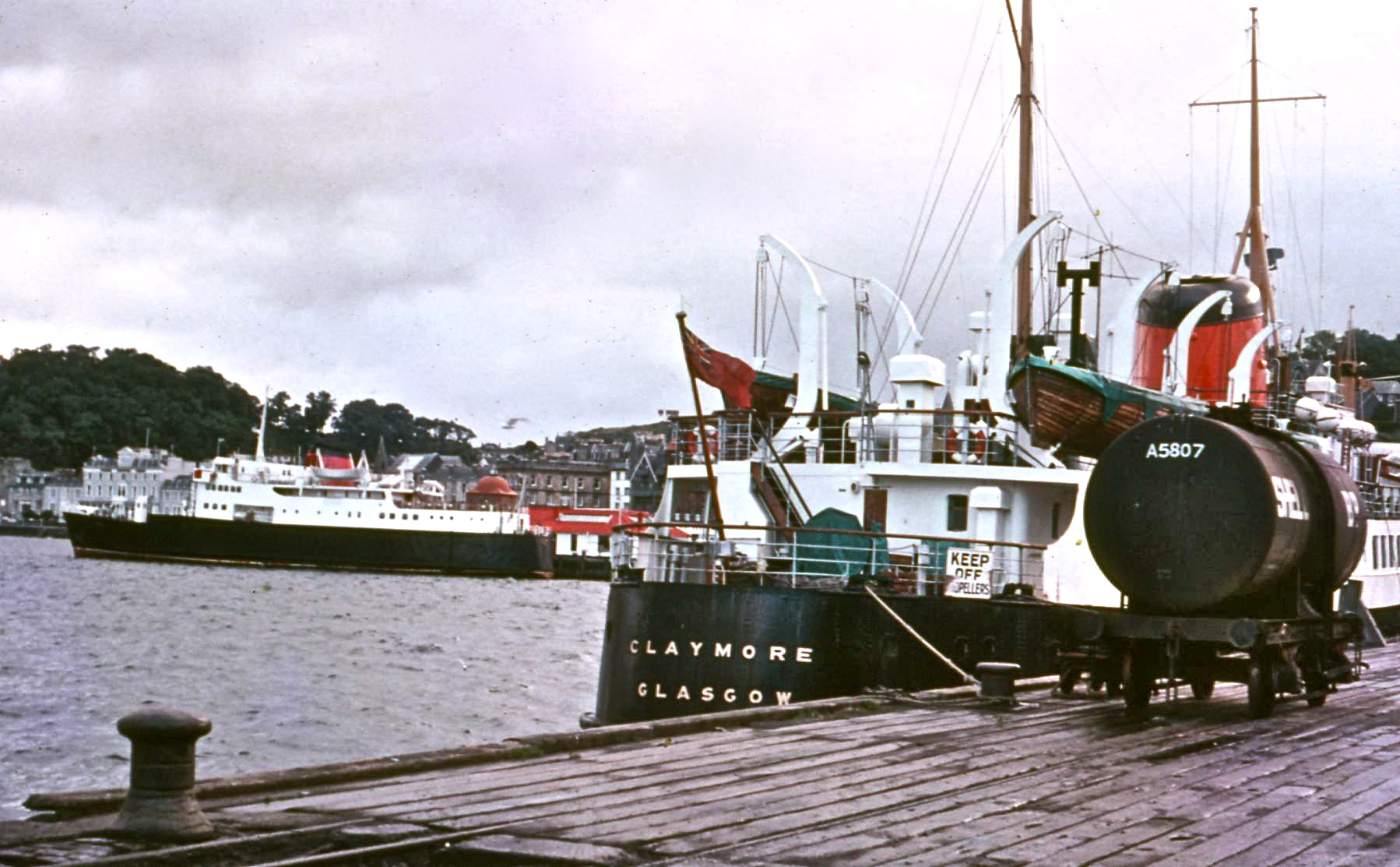
at Oban railway wharf

== Service ==
Claymore entered service in 1955 on the Inner Isles mail route and remained on this route for almost her entire career. She sailed from Oban to Tobermory, Coll, Tiree, Castlebay and Lochboisdale three time per week. On some summer afternoons she gave short excursions from Oban. Until the arrival of the 1964 car ferries, Claymore was the regular relief at Stornoway. She continued as relief there until the arrival of MV Iona.

In the spring of 1972, Loch Seaforth, which could carry more cars, replaced her on the Inner Isles Mail. The wreck of Loch Seaforth in March 1973 prolonged the survival of Claymore, although she was largely laid up for much of her last years on the west coast. Claymore spent the summer of 1974 largely serving Coll, Tiree and Colonsay. After over a year laid up at Greenock, Claymore emerged in October 1975, for a last, brief spell of west coast service, making her last passenger sailing in Scotland, from Colonsay to Oban, on 7 November 1975.

In Greece, City of Hydra made day-cruises for Cycladic Cruises to Hydra, Aegina and Poros from Flisvos Marina.
