= SS Hebrides =

Passenger and cargo ship

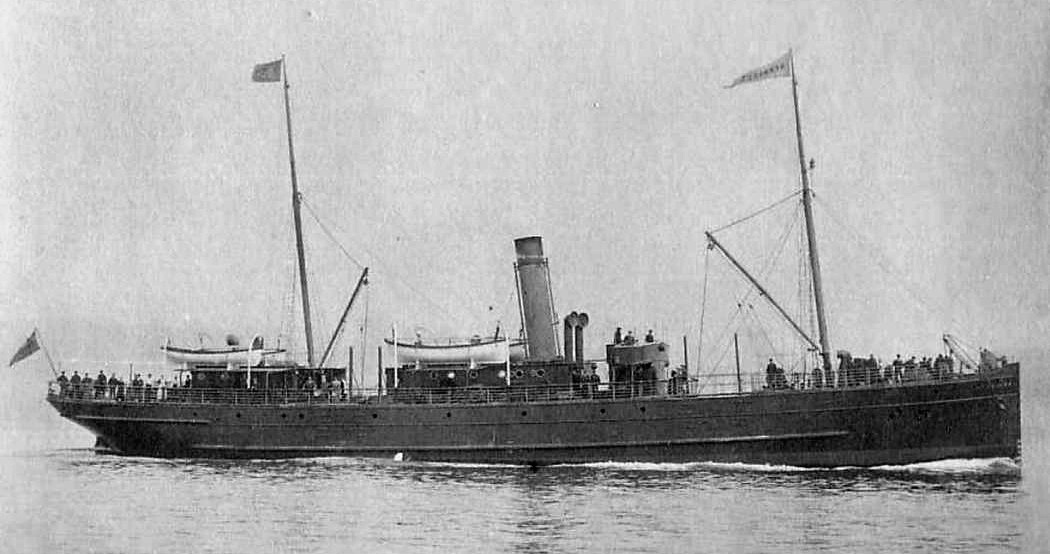
- SS Hebrides in her early years

History

United Kingdom
- Name: SS Hebrides
- Owner: 1898: John McCallum, Glasgow; 1930: McCallum, Orme & Co., Glasgow; 1955: David MacBrayne
- Route: Hebrides
- Builder: Ailsa Shipbuilding Company; Engines by A & J Inglis
- Yard number: 70
- Launched: 24 March 1898
- Home port: Glasgow
- Fate: Broken up at Port Glasgow 1955

General characteristics
- Tonnage: 585 GRT
- Length: 180 ft (54.9 m)
- Beam: 28.1 ft (8.6 m)
- Draught: 13.2 ft (4.0 m)
- Installed power: Triple expansion steam
- Propulsion: single screw
- Speed: 12.8 kn (trials)

SS Hebrides was a passenger and cargo ship which operated in the Western Isles of Scotland. Built in 1898 for John McCallum, it became part of the fleet of David MacBrayne, serving St Kilda until 1955.

== History ==
Hebrides was the only cargo ship owned by John McCallum. Built in 1898, she had passenger cabins and also offered leisurely summer cruises round the Western Isles. She was re-boilered in 1937. Taken over by MacBrayne's in 1948, she survived in their fleet until the arrival of Loch Ard in 1955.

Hebrides was scrapped at Smith & Company, Port Glasgow. The ship's bell was in the foyer of the Harris Hotel, Tarbert for 20 years and is now on display in the lounge of the present Caledonian MacBrayne ferry MV Hebrides.

== Service ==
John McCallum operated his own routes in the area generally covered by MacBraynes. Hebrides provided a service to St Kilda. During the Second World War, she was chartered to MacBraynes, sailing between Oban and Tiree. She assisted at the evacuation of Soay and took part in a similar duty at St Kilda. In her final years, she carried cargo and livestock only on her old route from Glasgow, on alternate runs with Loch Frisa.

== See also ==
- St Kilda, Britain's Loneliest Isle
