= David Hutcheson (businessman) =

Scottish shipowner (1799–1880)

- David Hutcheson, photographed c. 1870.
- Born: 22 March 1799
- Died: December 1880 (aged 81)
- Monuments: Hutcheson Monument, Isle of Kerrera
- Occupation: Shipping businessman
- Years active: 1848 - 1876
- Organization(s): David & Alexander Hutchinson

David Hutcheson (1799–1880) was a Scottish businessman and shipowner who was a founder of David & Alexander Hutcheson & Co., a steamship company that operated services to the West Highlands and Islands of Scotland.

Hutcheson's company opened up travel to remote western islands and developed the Glasgow–Ardrishaig “Royal Route”. He is memorialised in the Hutcheson Monument on the Isle of Kerrera.

== Life ==
David Hutcheson was born in Inverkeithing, Fife, on 22 March 1799, the son of David Hutcheson and Mary Grierson.

His early years were spent in Port Glasgow, Inverclyde.

His first employment was as clerk in "Steel's cooperage" in Port-Glasgow, which he left in 1817.

Hutcheson worked for J & G Burns Steamship Co, rising to the position of Chief Clerk. In 1848 he formed David & Alexander Hutcheson, with his brother Alexander Hutcheson and David MacBrayne as his partners.

D & A Hutcheson acquired Burns' shipping lines serving the Highlands and Islands. They opened new routes, acquired rival businesses, and in 1855 ordered the Iona, their first purpose-built paddle steamer. By 1878 they had a fleet of fifteen vessels. They leased the island of Staffa, ensuring access to Fingal's Cave for the tourist trade.

Hutcheson retired from the business in 1876 and his brother two years later, leaving MacBrayne as sole owner of the line. The company would eventually become Caledonian MacBrayne.

== Death ==
Hutcheson died in December 1880. Prior to his death, he had written the following poem about his desire to be buried near Oban, which was realised:

"For I would wish my bones to lie

Among the scenes I loved so well;

The mountain glen, the gorgeous sky,

The wimpling burn, the gowany dell.

And where were sepulchre more sweet

For me than 'mong dear Oban's braes,

Where oft in contemplation sweet

I, rambling, tuned my simple lays."

The Hutcheson monument is a granite obelisk erected in 1883 by public subscription on the Isle of Kerrera overlooking Ardantrive Bay.

"Erected by a grateful public in memory of David Hutcheson by whose energy and enterprise the benefits of greatly improved steam communication were conferred on the West Highlands and Islands of Scotland 1883"

The monument is catgeory C listed by Historic Scotland. On their statement of special interest, they note:

"David Hutcheson is a person of significance in the history of the West Highlands and Islands. His firm's contributions to travel and accessing remote islands is of regional importance whilst contributing to the national prevalence of touring and travelling in Scotland. Hutcheson's association with the monument is directly recorded by its inscription, which is a testament to local feeling and gratitude to Hutcheson and tells the story of his impact on the region".
