= MV Lochmor (1930) =

History

United Kingdom
- Name: MV Lochmor; 1964: Amimoni (Panama)
- Owner: David MacBrayne; 1964: Tamis SA (Ezkos Maritime Technical Co Ltd), Piraeus
- Port of registry: Glasgow
- Route: Outer Isles mail steamer from Mallaig and Kyle of Lochalsh
- Builder: Ardrossan Dockyard; Engines: Davey Paxman & Co Ltd, Colchester; new engines fitted 03/1960 & 04/1961
- Yard number: 349
- Launched: 15 May 1930
- Out of service: 1964
- Fate: Scrapped – 1984

General characteristics
- Type: Passenger Cargo Vessel
- Tonnage: 543 GRT
- Length: 162 ft (49 m)
- Beam: 29 ft (8.8 m)
- Draught: 9 ft (2.7 m)
- Installed power: 2 oil 4SA each 12cy 660bhp
- Propulsion: Twin screws
- Speed: 12 knots; <10 knots (service)
- Capacity: 400

MV Lochmor I was the David MacBrayne Ltd Outer Isles mail steamer from 1930 until 1964. She was superseded by a new generation of car ferries.

== History ==
MV Lochmor and her sister MV Lochearn were built by Ardrossan Dockyard. She was launched on 15 May 1930. For much of her career, the skipper was Captain "Squeaky" Robertson, a well known and popular local man.

In March 1931 in thick fog, Lochearn ran aground on a sandbank at Lonbane, Applecross. Lochmor went to assist but she also became stuck. The 85 year old paddle steamer Glencoe successfully towed them both off.

After the war, both sisters were fitted with Paxman Ricardo diesel engines, improving their performance.

Lochmor grounded on rocks to the northeast of Scarba, Argyll in a gale in October 1948, while transporting cattle to Jura. She was again stranded overnight close to the pier at Lochboisdale in November 1952.

Both sisters were sold to Greek owners on 26 August 1964 and left Scotland for service in the Greek Islands. Lochmor was renamed Amimoni.

== Layout ==
Lochmor was a passenger and cargo vessel, with cabins for 22 passengers. Passenger accommodation consisted of a dining room, lounge and smoking room, with first and second class cabins. She loaded vehicles along with other cargo, using crane and sling.

== Service ==
Based at Kyle, Lochmor was the Outer Islands mail steamer from 1930 until 1964. She served Tarbert and Rodel (Harris), Lochmaddy (North Uist) and Lochboisdale (South Uist) three times a week. In the summer of 1963, she sailed out round the south of Skye to Lochmaddy on Mondays, with calls at Glenelg, Mallaig and the Small Isles, returning round the north of Skye on Tuesdays with calls at Rodel, Tarbert, Harris and Scalpay. She reversed the route on Wednesdays/Thursdays to Lochmaddy and Lochboisdale and made a further "anti-clockwise" outward trip on Fridays. The direct return to Mallaig on Saturday morning left time for the Small Isles (Eigg, Rùm and Canna) in the afternoon, before returning via Mallaig to Kyle, where she spent Sundays tied up. During the tourist season the regular Skye boat took cruises to Loch Coruisk, and Lochmor added Portree to the mail route.

On arrival of the first hoist-loading car ferry, MV Hebrides on the Uig triangle in 1964, Lochmor moved to the Mallaig to Armadale crossing, awaiting MV Clansman later in the same year. Scalpay and the Small Isles were served by their own dedicated vessels.
