= MV Lochnevis (1934) =

History

United Kingdom
- Name: MV Lochnevis
- Namesake: Loch Nevis
- Owner: David MacBrayne Ltd
- Route: Portree mail steamer from Mallaig
- Builder: William Denny and Brothers, Dumbarton
- Cost: £45,999
- Yard number: 1273
- Launched: 15 May 1934
- In service: 1934
- Out of service: 1969
- Home port: Glasgow
- Fate: Sold for scrap, 1974

General characteristics
- Type: Passenger ferry
- Tonnage: 573 GRT; 217 NRT; 115 DWT
- Length: 178.5 ft (54.4 m)
- Beam: 31.1 ft (9.5 m)
- Draught: 7.5 ft (2.3 m)
- Installed power: 2 x Paxman oil engines, powering 2 electric motors each 525shp
- Speed: 15 kn (service)
- Capacity: 700 passengers

MV Lochnevis was a MacBrayne mail steamer, built in 1934 for the West Highland service. She was withdrawn in 1969, sold to Dutch owners in 1970 and scrapped in 1974.

== History ==
Lochnevis was built by William Denny and Brothers for David MacBrayne Ltd as the Portree mail steamer. As Mail steamers were superseded by car ferries, Lochnevis served as an excursion steamer from Oban. She was sold in 1970 and finally scrapped in 1974.

== Layout ==
Lochnevis was a two class vessel, designed for shorter voyages. Her passenger accommodation consisted of lounges, dining rooms, smoke rooms and plenty of covered deck space, but no overnight accommodation.

Lochnevis was fitted with two 6-cylinder Paxman MY monobloc engines (a marine version of the 13" x 16" VY engine), each rated 650 bhp at 500 rpm. These powered two shunt motors, each with an output of 525 shaft horsepower at 400 rpm and directly connected to a propeller. The engine's spring mounted box girder bedplate was designed and provided by Christie & Grey to minimise vibration. The electrical machinery was manufactured and supplied by the General Electric Company. She was re-engined in 1957 by Mirlees National Gas & Oil, Ashton-under-Lyne with 4SA 6-cylinder engines.

== Service ==
Lochnevis was built for the Mallaig - Kyle - Portree route, then the principal access to the Isle of Skye, replacing the paddle steamer, Fusilier. She was launched on 15 May 1934 with the naming ceremony performed by Lady Elena Read, the wife of Sir Alfred Read, chairman of Coast Lines Ltd. In addition to the mail run, she also gave popular cruises to Gairloch, Loch Torridon and Loch Scavaig. The first of these, on 5 July 1934, was an evening cruise from Portree to Gairloch and back again. During World War II, she served as a minelayer. After the war, she ran the first summer excursion sailing from Oban, to the Sound of Mull and Tobermory, Mull with all the tickets selling in 15 minutes. The Portree mail service was being superseded by the short car ferry crossing at Kyle. In 1958, Lochnevis was replaced by a smaller vessel and moved to Oban, where she served as an excursion steamer in summer and relief mail steamer in winter.

Withdrawn from service in 1969, she was sold to Dutch owners (A.C. Slooten, Wormer), but did not return to service and was scrapped at Wormer in 1974.
