= TS King George V =

Clyde-built turbine steamer (1926-1984)

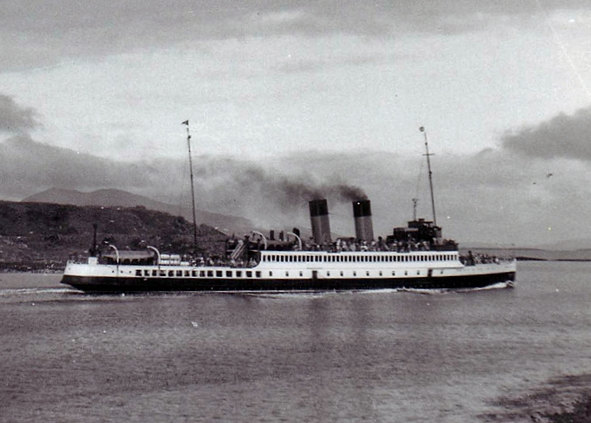
- TS King George V leaving Oban in 1967

History

United Kingdom
- Name: TS/RMS King George V
- Namesake: King George V
- Owner: 1926: Turbine Steamers Ltd; 1935: David MacBrayne Ltd; 1973: Caledonian MacBrayne; 1975: Bristol Channel Shiprepairers; 1981 - 1984: Bass Charrington
- Builder: William Denny and Brothers, Dumbarton; Engines: Parsons Marine Engineering
- Yard number: 1182
- Launched: 29 April 1926
- In service: 1926
- Out of service: 1974
- Home port: Glasgow
- Fate: Scrapped, 1984

General characteristics
- Type: Passenger turbine steamer
- Tonnage: 789 GRT; 320 NRT
- Length: 260.6 ft (79.4 m)
- Beam: 32.1 ft (9.8 m)
- Draft: 7 ft (2.1 m)
- Installed power: 7 turbines
- Propulsion: twin screw
- Speed: 16 kn (service)

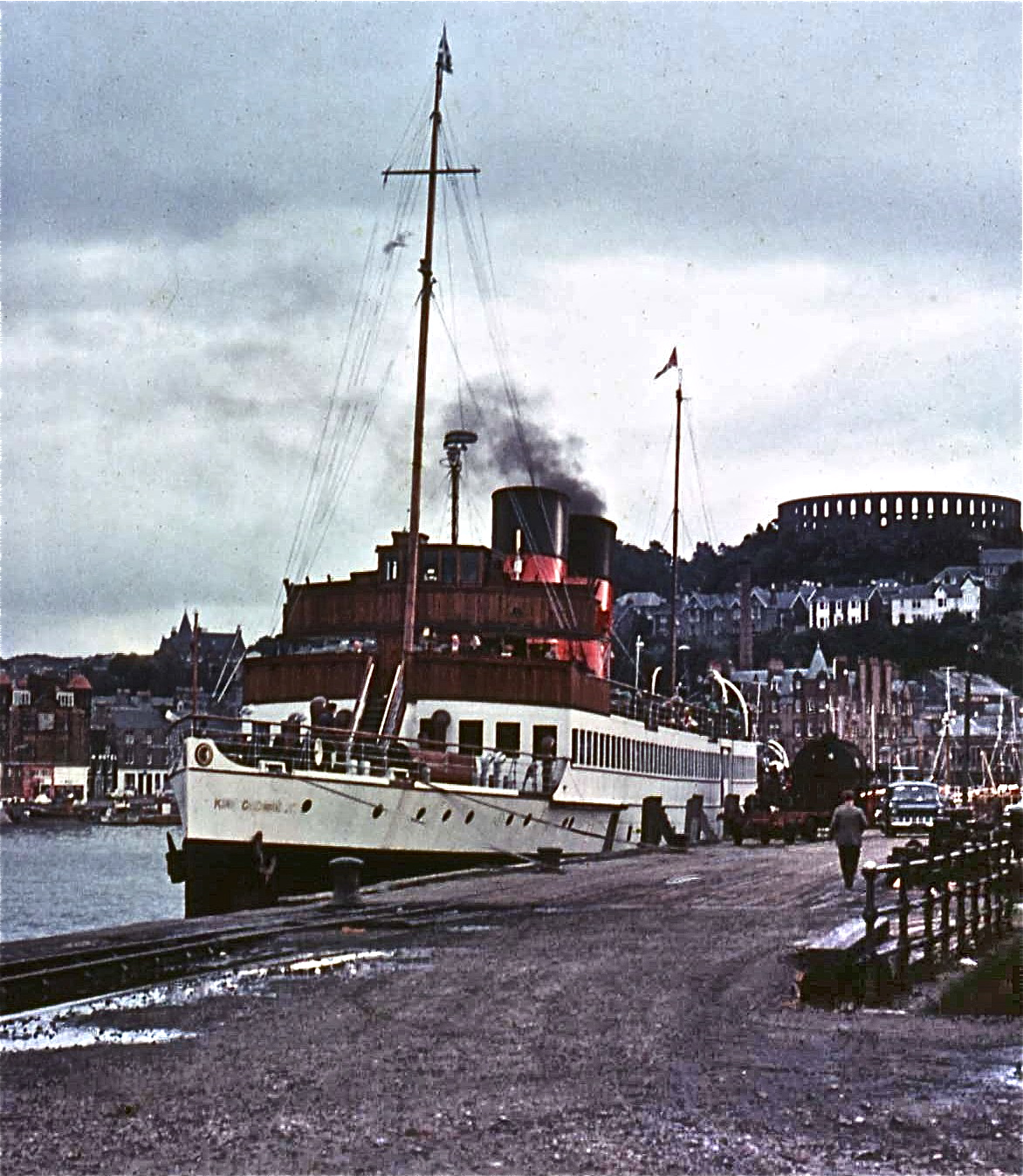
At railway quay Oban 1970.

TS King George V (the "KGV") was a pioneering Clyde passenger turbine steamer, built in 1926. She was a popular boat, seeing service to Inveraray and later based in Oban, and withdrawn in 1974.

== History ==
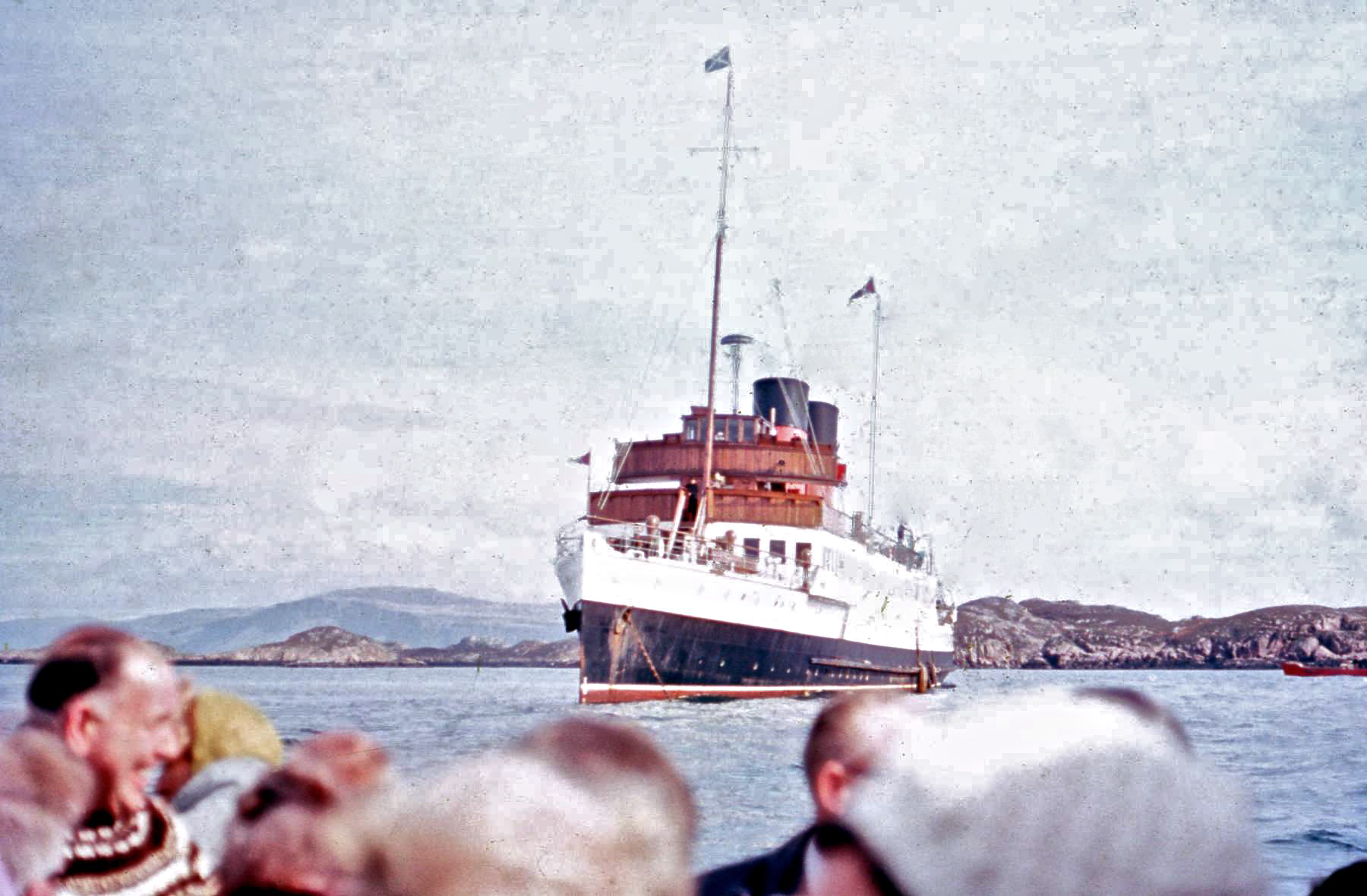
View from tender in 1970, when anchored off Iona.

King George V was built by William Denny and Brothers for the Turbine Steamers Ltd as a pioneering turbine powered vessel intended for longer routes. She passed to the ownership of David MacBrayne Ltd in October 1935, when plans to rename her were never enacted. Displaced by MV Columba, she was withdrawn from service in 1974. Several attempts were made to preserve her as a floating pub or restaurant, but all failed. King George V was burnt out at Cardiff docks in 1981 and scrapped in 1984.

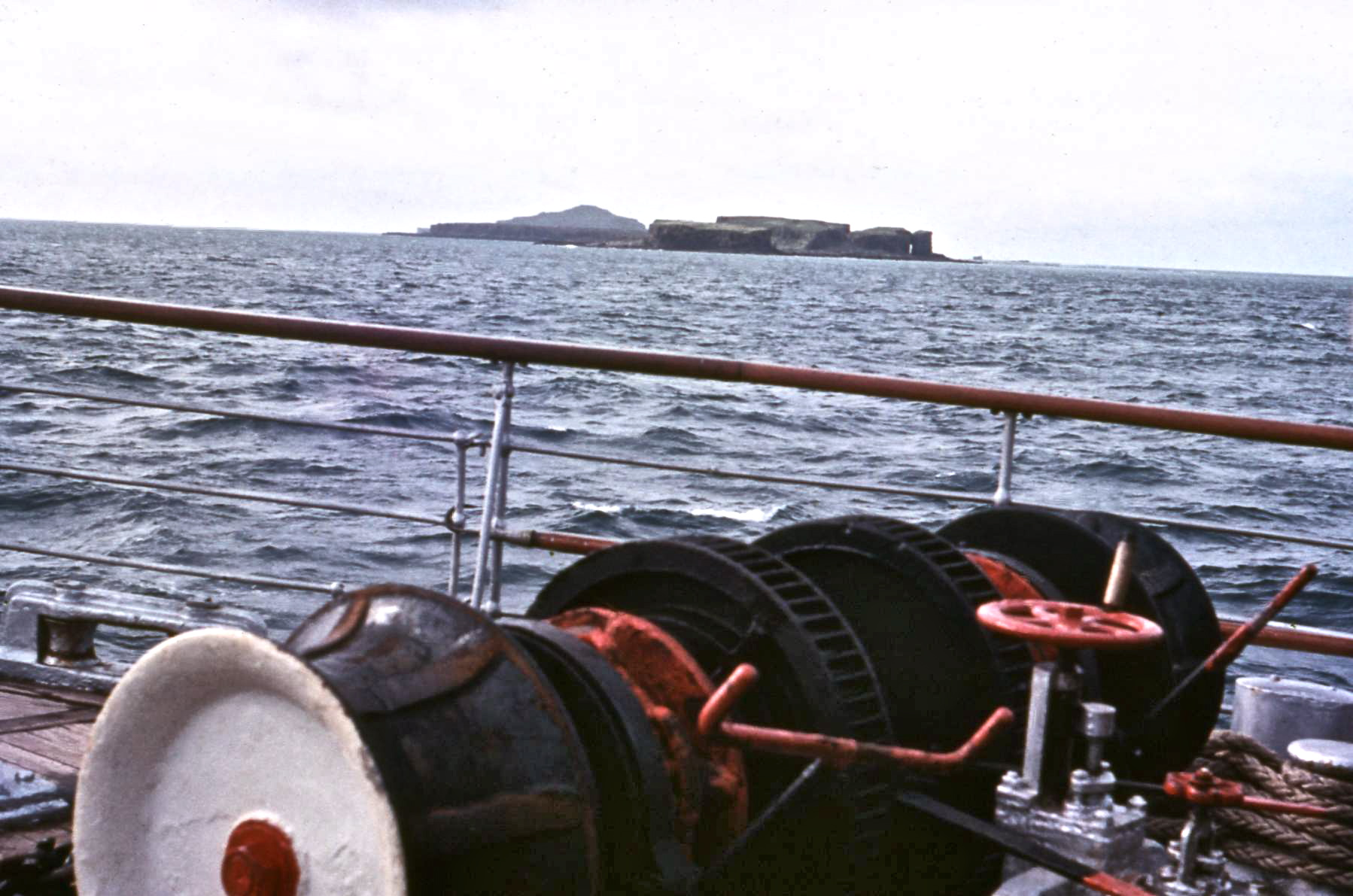
View of capstan in 1970 off Staffa.

== Layout ==
King George V was novel in design, providing spacious accommodation with an enclosed promenade deck, the saloon extending the full width of the hull and half the length of the vessel. Above this was an observation deck. The restaurant was aft on the main deck, with large observation windows.

Her machinery was even more innovative. Seven turbines, with two very high pressure boilers, were linked by gears to twin propellers. The boilers had to be replaced after tubes burst. A first incident happened off Irvine at the end of the 1927 season, when two firemen were killed. A second incident was in Kilbrannan Sound, with no loss of life. She was re-boilered in 1929 and again 1935. In 1935, one turbine was removed to simplify the power system and two new, slightly broader funnels were fitted.

A main mast was fitted in 1952, radar in 1958 and in 1959, inflatable life rafts replaced two of her lifeboats. She was further modernised in the winter refits of 1960 and 1961.

== Service ==
King George V was initially mainly used on the Inveraray service but also visited Campbeltown. She became a much loved ship. After 1935, she was based in Oban cruising round Mull, to Iona, Staffa and Fort William.

In World War II, she was requisitioned as a troop carrier, initially based at Southampton. In 1940, she evacuated troops from Rotterdam, Ostend, Calais, Boulogne and famously, Dunkirk, landing 4300 men at Dover. Returning to the Clyde in 1941 for tendering duties, she carried Prime Minister, Winston Churchill to his battleship en route to the Atlantic Conference.

After the war, she resumed MacBrayne cruises on the Clyde in 1946, including the summer Ardrishaig mail service. She was back to Oban in 1947 and each summer until withdrawn in 1974. In her final years she also undertook charters, including one to Bangor in Ireland.

== See also ==
- List of ships built by William Denny and Brothers
