= MV Clansman (1964) =

1964 ferry

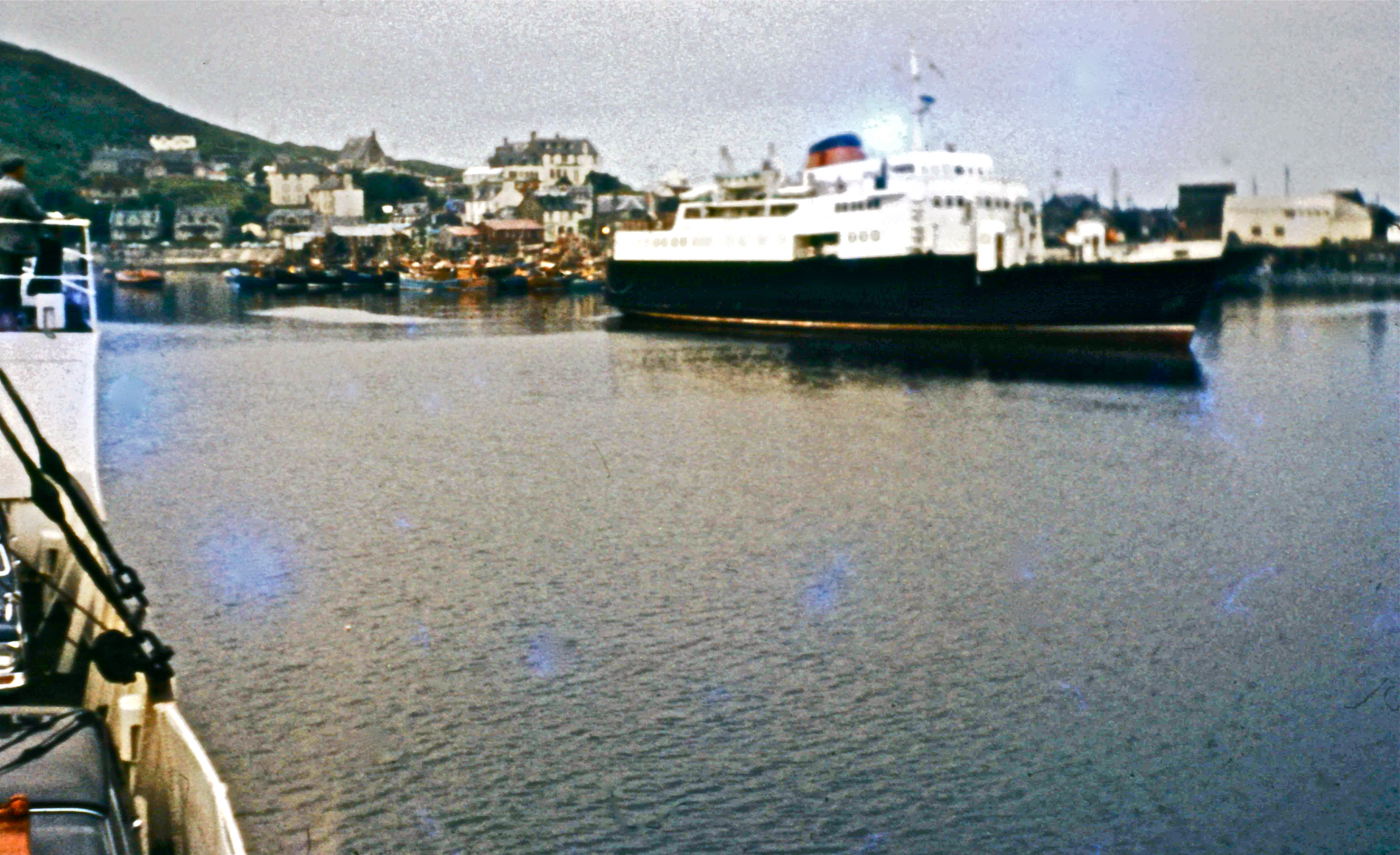
- MV Clansman at Mallaig in 1967, viewed from MV Loch Seaforth

History

United Kingdom
- Name: MV Clansman; 1985: Tamira; 1986: Al Hussen; 1986: Al Rashheed
- Owner: Secretary of State for Scotland; October 1973: David MacBrayne Ltd; April 1974: Caledonian MacBrayne Holdings Ltd; 1980: Caledonian MacBrayne Ltd
- Operator: David MacBrayne Ltd
- Port of registry: Leith then Glasgow
- Builder: Hall, Russell & Company, Aberdeen; Engines: Crossley Bros Ltd, Manchester
- Yard number: 911
- Launched: 16 January 1964
- In service: 5 June 1964
- Out of service: August 1984
- Identification: Official Number: 305302; IMO number: 6404935; Callsign: HZIJ

General characteristics
- Type: Vehicle ferry
- Tonnage: 1,420 GT; 407 DWT
- Length: 235 feet (72 m)
- Beam: 46 feet (14 m)
- Draught: 9 feet (2.7 m)
- Installed power: 4 x Glenniffer generators
- Propulsion: Machinery: 2 x Crossley SCSA. each 8 cyls. 10½ x 13½"
- Speed: 14 knots (26 km/h) (service)
- Capacity: 600 passengers and 50 cars

MV Clansman was the second of a trio of hoist-loading car ferries built for David MacBrayne Ltd in 1964 and operated on the Mallaig to Armadale, Skye route for ten years. Converted to ro-ro operation, she operated on the Stornoway, Isle of Mull and Arran services. Underpowered and troubled by mechanical breakdowns, she was taken out of service after 20 years.

== History ==
The Secretary of State for Scotland ordered a trio of near-identical car ferries for the Western Isles. Hall, Russell & Company of Aberdeen won the contract to build them, ahead of fifteen other British yards. The new ferries were initially owned by the Scottish Office and registered in Leith. They were chartered to David MacBrayne Ltd and were all equipped to serve as floating nuclear shelters, in the event of national emergency. This included vertical sliding watertight doors that could seal off the car deck immediately aft of the hoist, a positive pressure CBRN defence system, and decontamination sprinklers. Clansman, the second of the trio, was launched on 16 January 1964 and entered service on 5 June 1964.

To combat the limitations of hoist operation, Clansman underwent a nine-month refit at Troon from October 1972 to convert her to a drive-through ferry. Hoist and side-ramps were removed, and bow and stern ramps were fitted. She was lengthened by 36 feet forward of the superstructure, and her passenger accommodation was raised to increase headroom in the car deck. Twin rudders and a new 4-ton bow-thrust unit were added, and her machinery was converted to be fully bridge controlled. She emerged in the new CalMac livery, but unfortunately was not re-engined, which ultimately led to her premature downfall.

== Layout ==
As originally fitted, Clansman had a car deck that could take 50 cars. Hydraulic lifts and side-ramps allowed vehicles to drive on and off conventional piers at any state of tide. Vehicles were turned on the hoist platform and at the stern end of the vehicle deck, using 14-foot-diameter (4.3 m) manual turntables. The hoists avoided the cost of installing linkspans on the piers, but the process was slow and restricted the length and weight of vehicles that could be carried.

On the enclosed upper deck, there was a bright cafeteria/restaurant aft, with a substantial galley and pantry. Forward were a lounge-bar, a little shop and the pursers' office. Forward on the promenade deck was a well-fitted observation lounge, with comfortable armchairs. The interiors of Clansman were designed by John McNeece. There was ample open deck space aft of this lounge. The funnel and two lifeboats stood on the boat deck, with the bridge forward. The vessel had sleeping accommodation for 51 below the car deck.

In 1973 Clansman had bow and stern doors fitted, allowing full ro-ro operation.

== Service ==
Clansman entered service on the Mallaig to Armadale, Skye crossing, replacing the former Outer Isles mail steamer Lochmor, which had been displaced by the arrival of MV Hebrides. Her primary function was as a relief vessel and she was considerably under-employed on the summer Skye crossing. From June 1967, she added Minch crossings to her summer roster, initially to Lochboisdale, and from 1971 to Castlebay.

In 1969, Clansman become the first MacBrayne vessel to circumnavigate Britain when she sailed to London for a ten-day "Highland Fling" extravaganza thrown by the Highlands and Islands Development Board. For five months in early 1970 she had a yellow funnel while on charter to the CSP, operating between Gourock and Dunoon, awaiting the new MV Iona. 1971 saw varied service, with a temporary service from Oban to Port Askaig and Colonsay, and relief on the Inner Isles Mail.

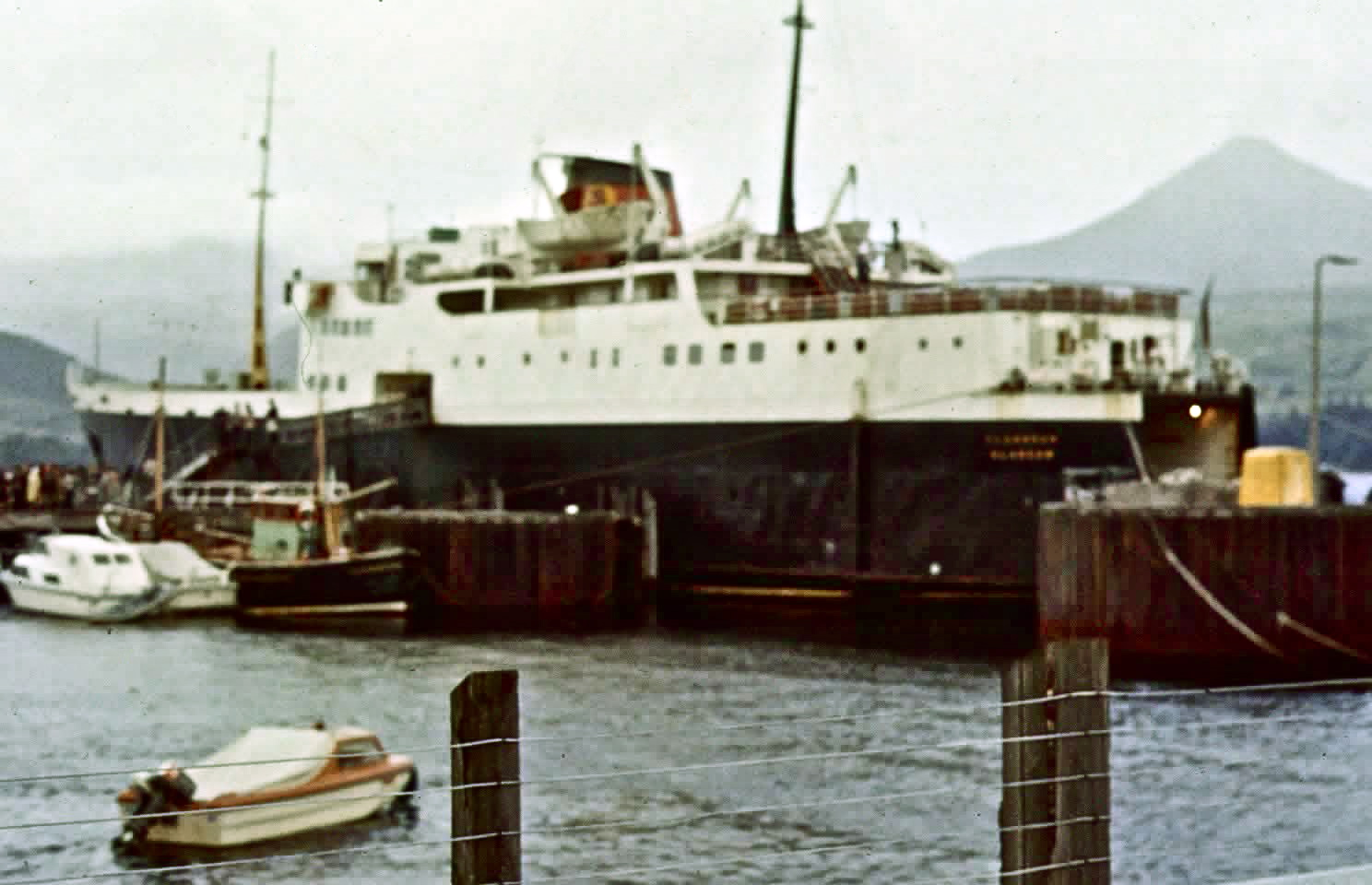
1979 at Brodick, Arran.

Following her 1972/73 rebuild at the Ailsa yard in Troon, Clansman took over the new Ullapool to Stornoway car ferry service, inaugurated earlier in 1973 by MV Iona. The service was disrupted when Iona suffered an engine failure in June 1973 and Clansman was rushed to the Minch while work continued on board and soon broke down herself. Eventually, the service settled down, but Clansman was both vulnerable to serious weather and too slow and by 1974 was replaced by the new MV Suilven. Clansman spent several seasons on the Isle of Mull crossing, before moving to Arran. Clansman continued to deputise on the Ullapool to Stornoway service throughout the 1970s and early 1980s while Suilven went for overhaul.

Withdrawn from service following a serious mechanical breakdown in March 1984, Clansman was sold to Torbay Seaways for a new service to the Channel Islands. The inability to construct a linkspan, led to her sister, MV Hebrides running the service. Clansman was sold to Maltese owners for Red Sea service. Her last entry in Lloyd's Register was in 1994–95.
