= MV Pentalina-B =

Ferry built in 1970

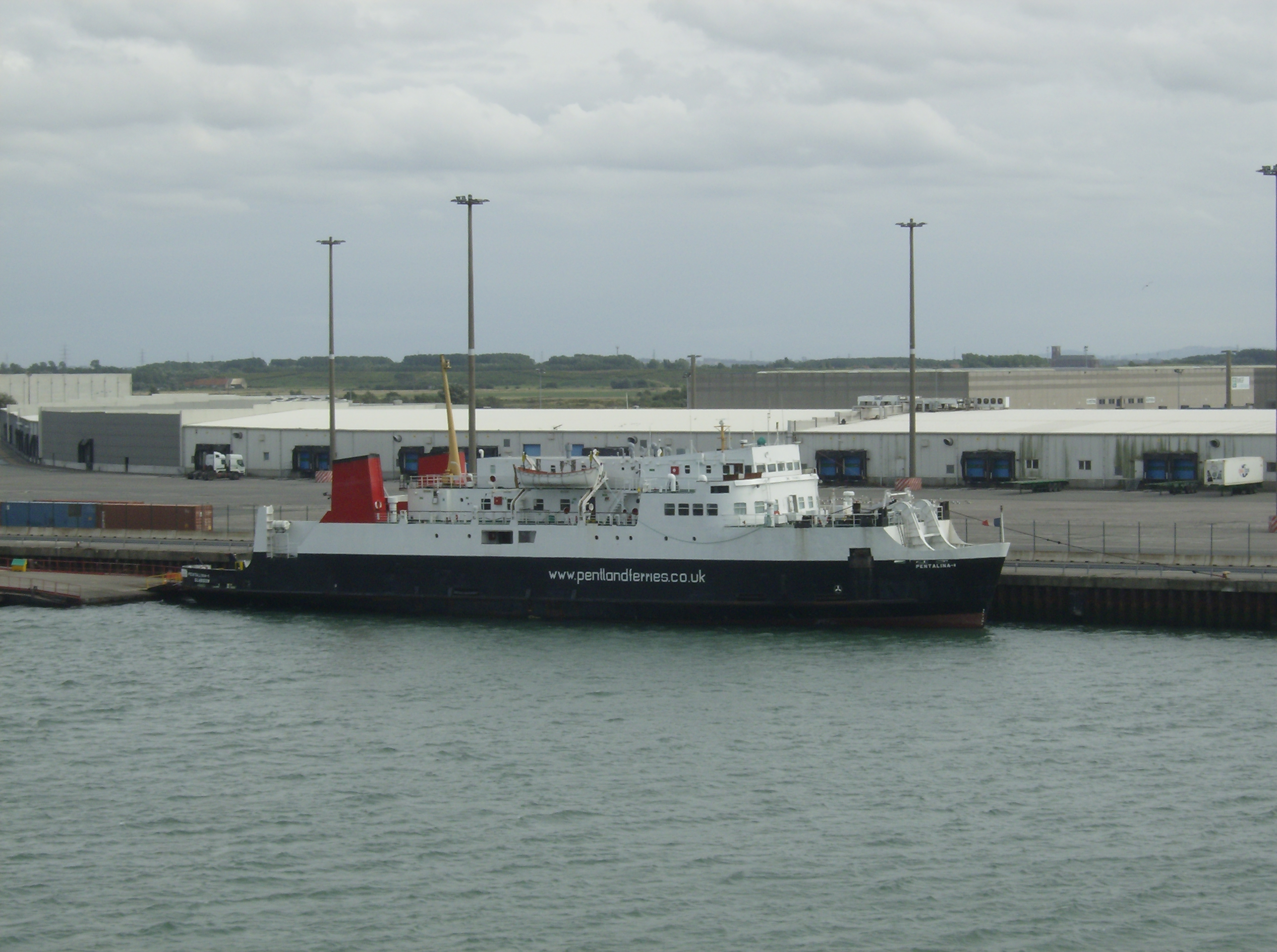
- MV Pentalina-B

History

United Kingdom
- Name: MV Iona
- Namesake: Hebridean island, Iona
- Owner: Scottish Transport Group (STG)
- Operator: 1970 - 1973: David MacBrayne / CSP; 1973 - 1997: Caledonian MacBrayne
- Port of registry: Glasgow
- Ordered: 10 December 1968
- Builder: Ailsa Shipbuilding Company, Troon
- Cost: £740,000
- Yard number: 530
- Launched: 22 January 1970
- Christened: Mrs P M Thomas, wife of STG Chairman
- In service: 29 May 1970
- Out of service: 25 October 1997
- Home port: Glasgow
- Identification: MMSI Number: 235018108; IMO number: 7009653

United Kingdom
- Name: MV Pentalina-B
- Owner: Pentland Ferries
- Route: Pentland Firth
- Acquired: November 1997
- In service: May 2001
- Home port: Glasgow
- Identification: Callsign: GNOT
- Fate: Sold 2009

History

Cape Verde
- Name: MV Pentalina-B
- Port of registry: Cape Verde
- Acquired: late 2009
- Out of service: June 2014
- Identification: Callsign: D4FU
- Fate: Ran aground at Moia Moia, Cape Verde

General characteristics
- Type: Steel TSMV
- Tonnage: 1324 GT
- Length: 230 feet (70 m)
- Beam: 44 feet (13 m)
- Draught: 11.5 feet (3.5 m)
- Ramps: Stern/side
- Installed power: Twin English Electric/ Paxman, Colchester, (12YLC) engines, 3,200 Total BHP
- Propulsion: Twin propellers, 1 Bow thruster
- Speed: 15 knots (28 km/h; 17 mph) (service)
- Boats & landing craft carried: 4 lifeboats
- Capacity: 581 passengers, 47 cars
- Crew: 23

MV Pentalina-B was a ferry which operated on a variety of Scottish routes. Launched in 1970 as MV Iona, she was the first drive-through roll-on/roll-off ferry built for the David MacBrayne fleet. She was the first ship in the company's history to have bridge-controlled engines and geared transmission, rather than direct drive. During her career she inaugurated more endloading linkspans than the rest of the fleet put together. Purchased by Pentland Ferries in 1997, she was renamed MV Pentalina-B and operated across the Pentland Firth until the arrival of their new vessel. In 2009, she was sold to a Cape Verde owner.

== History ==
MV Iona (VII) was the first of a new generation of major car ferries built for the Scottish Transport Group to replace the ageing 1939 mailboat Lochiel, serving Islay, Jura, Gigha and Colonsay from West Loch Tarbert. Early in 1968 MacBraynes were authorised to order a large new car ferry for the Argyll Hebrides and placed an order with the Ailsa yard in Troon. The deep-drafted vessel could not operate from MacBrayne's existing West Loch Tarbert pier and a site at Redhouse, much further down the loch was identified. In January 1969, Argyll County Council announced that they would not proceed with works at Redhouse. As the alternative route from Oban was too long, the entire scheme was abandoned in August 1969. Instead, the hoist-loading MV Arran, one of the pioneering Clyde car ferries replaced MV Lochiel at Islay, competing with Western Ferries.

Iona was launched on 22 January 1970. The historic MacBrayne name had last been used by a celebrated paddle steamer of 1864, finally scrapped in 1935 after 72 years. She ran trials on 25 and 28 May and entered service the following day on the Gourock - Dunoon service for CSP, with MV Bute. She remained almost constantly on the Gourock - Dunoon station until November 1971, with the occasional assistance at Arran.

She was troubled by a run of early breakdowns: starboard ramp, hoist, forward capstan, bow-thrust unit and automatic steering. All were duly fixed, but her gearboxes continued to be a regular problem throughout her career. The absence of a turntable at the forward end of her car deck made the management of on-board traffic difficult. Initial problems were exacerbated by the need to use a side-loading hoist. Things improved after she hanselled the new end-loading linkspan at Gourock on 26 July 1971.

In April 1972 Iona moved to the Western Isles, serving Port Askaig and Colonsay, but from Oban rather than West Loch Tarbert. From 1 May she displaced the ageing Loch Seaforth as the Stornoway mailboat, and offered a car-carrying service to Kyle of Lochalsh and Mallaig. Iona's basic passenger facilities were less than ideal for the very long sailing to the West Highland railheads. Ullapool had been selected as a more suitable mainland port and Iona inaugurated a new terminal and linkspan there on 26 March 1973. Hoist loading continued at Stornoway for another two months. Thereafter Iona bow-loaded at Stornoway and stern-loaded at Ullapool. She was not a popular Lewis mailboat.

Major service problems began on 13 June 1973, when the Stornoway linkspan broke down. Iona had to hoist-load, again, for three days. Then Iona herself broke down, and for several days sailed at 10 knots on one engine. The newly rebuilt MV Clansman also lay idle at Stornoway. Iona again suffered engine trouble in July and spent the rest of that season as the Oban - Craignure ferry, opening the new Oban linkspan on 15 October.

On 29 April 1974, still without a permanent role, she started a new fast "Marine Motorway" from Oban to Castlebay and Lochboisdale, inaugurating a Lochboisdale linkspan that July and berthing there overnight. Iona included Coll and Tiree only in her winter roster, which also included a non-landing call at Tobermory. She still used her lift at Barra, Coll and Tiree. Even without Coll and Tiree, the sail from Oban to Barra and South Uist was still a long one and, with very early morning departures. Iona's lack of sleeping berths was greatly criticised. In her 1975 refit, a new deckhouse was added, aft of the officers' accommodation and incorporating eight double cabins. MV Iona completed five seasons on the Oban - Castlebay / Lochboisdale service, but proved increasingly too small, especially with the heavy year-round army traffic to Uist bases via Lochboisdale.

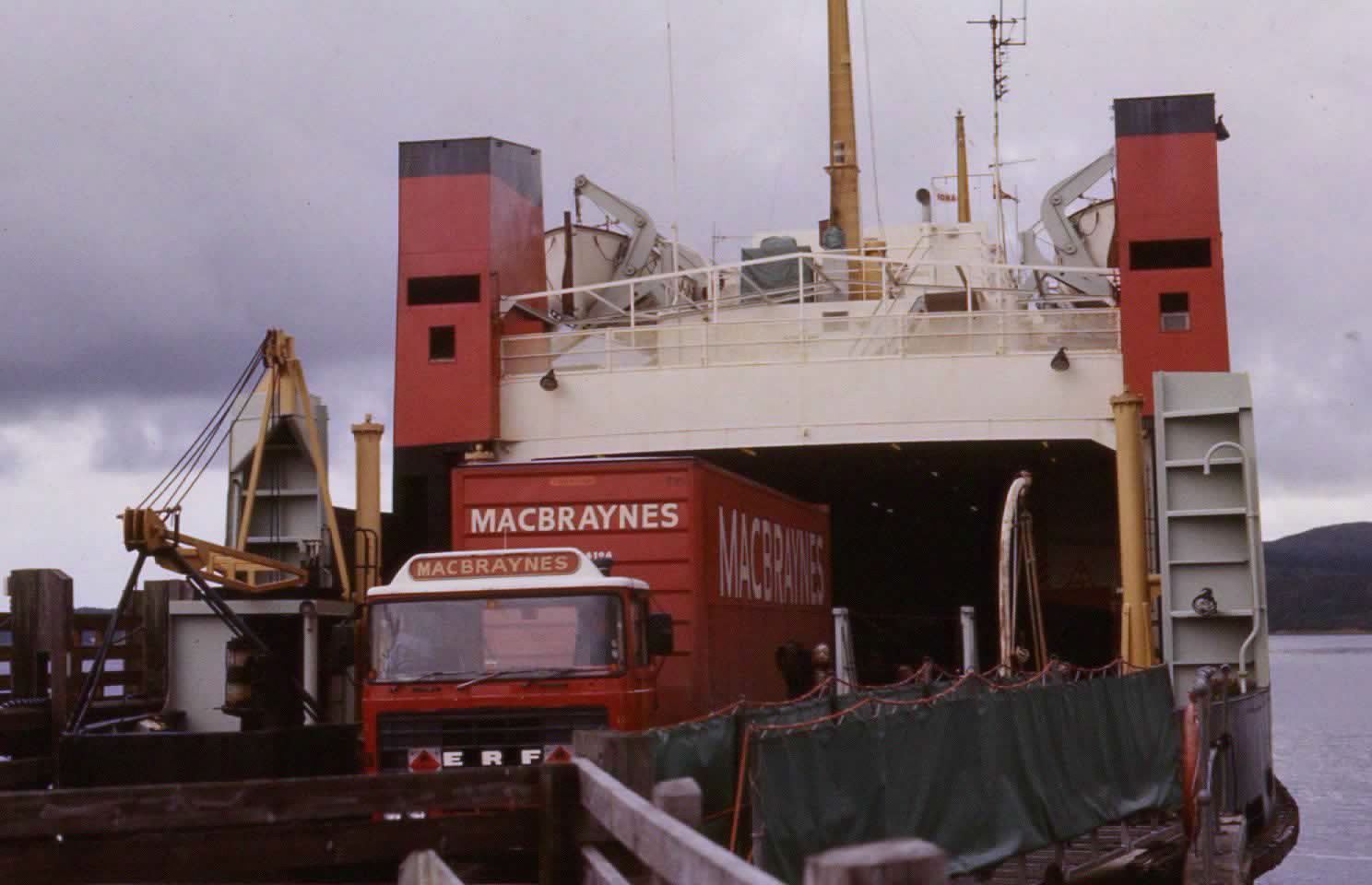
On Islay ferry route, 1979

The arrival of the new MV Claymore at Oban and the purchase of Western Ferries' Kennacraig facilities in October, finally allowed Iona to take up the Islay service on 15 February 1979. At first she gave three return runs daily between Kennacraig and Port Ellen, with two on Sundays. From 24 October 1979, she gave two calls weekly at the newly extended Port Askaig pier. After Western Ferries finally abandoned their Islay service at the end of September 1981, Cal-Mac offered more calls to Port Askaig.

Each winter Iona returned to Oban, relieving Claymore and usually had her own refit in February or March, sometimes at Govan, but more usually in Greenock. Losing her crane in 1983 and a Perspex canopy on her limited open deck space, she was extensively refurbished in 1984. She continued to be bothered with mechanical trouble, usually her gearboxes.

In May 1989, Iona was once again displaced by Claymore, cascading to the Islay station on the commissioning of MV Lord of the Isles. Iona took over the Mallaig - Armadale service. For the first time in sixteen years, she was again on a purely hoist-loading route, until she opened linkspans at Mallaig and Armadale on 1 April 1994. She was a great success at Armadale seeing an increase in traffic, and offering a varying routine of weekend sailings from Mallaig to Castlebay, Lochboisdale. In winter she relieved widely throughout the fleet.

It was not deemed worth massive alterations for her to remain in year-round Cal-Mac service. With the arrival of a new MV Clansman in July 1998, MV Lord of the Isles took over the Mallaig - Armadale run and Iona was placed on the sale list. She was sold during the 1997 season to newly reformed Pentland Ferries, eager to revive a Pentland Firth car ferry service from Gills Bay in Caithness to Burwick or St Margaret's Hope on Orkney.

Renamed MV Pentalina-B, it was several seasons before she took up the Gills Bay - Orkney service. In plain red and black funnels, she had an unexpected Cal-Mac charter in May 1998, when MV Isle of Lewis sustained a major breakdown before the new MV Clansman was ready for service. She maintained the Oban - Craignure service for just under three weeks, in partnership with MV Pioneer.

Pentalina-B's hoist and side ramps were removed in the summer of 1999.

From 2006 to 2009 Pentalina-B was chartered out in her off-season, to carry livestock across the English Channel from Dover. She was chartered to Cal-Mac in December 2008, operating the Ullapool - Stornoway freight run in place of MV Muirneag. She was again chartered to Cal-Mac in April 2009, operating a freight run from Kennacraig to Port Askaig.

She was sold in late 2009 to an owner in Cape Verde. and passed through the Irish Sea on 10 January 2010, en route for Mindelo. On the delivery voyage, she suffered water ingress and was towed to Brest Roads for repair.

In June 2014 she ran aground on rocks in Moia Moia Bay, Sao Domingos, Cape Verde following a breakdown during a storm. A short causeway was built out to the ship, allowing the cargo to be unloaded. The remains of the wreck remain extant on the shore at 15°1′26″N 23°26′21.5″W.

== Layout ==
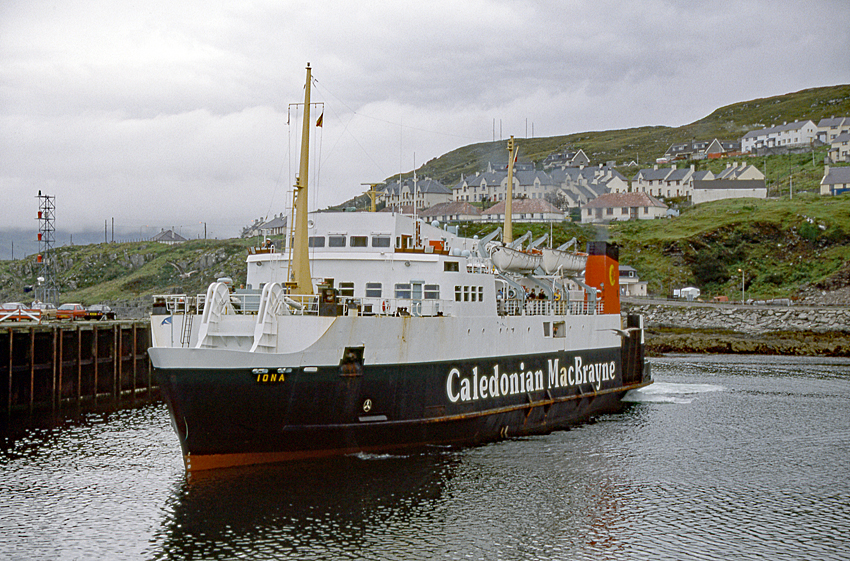
Iona at Mallaig in 1989

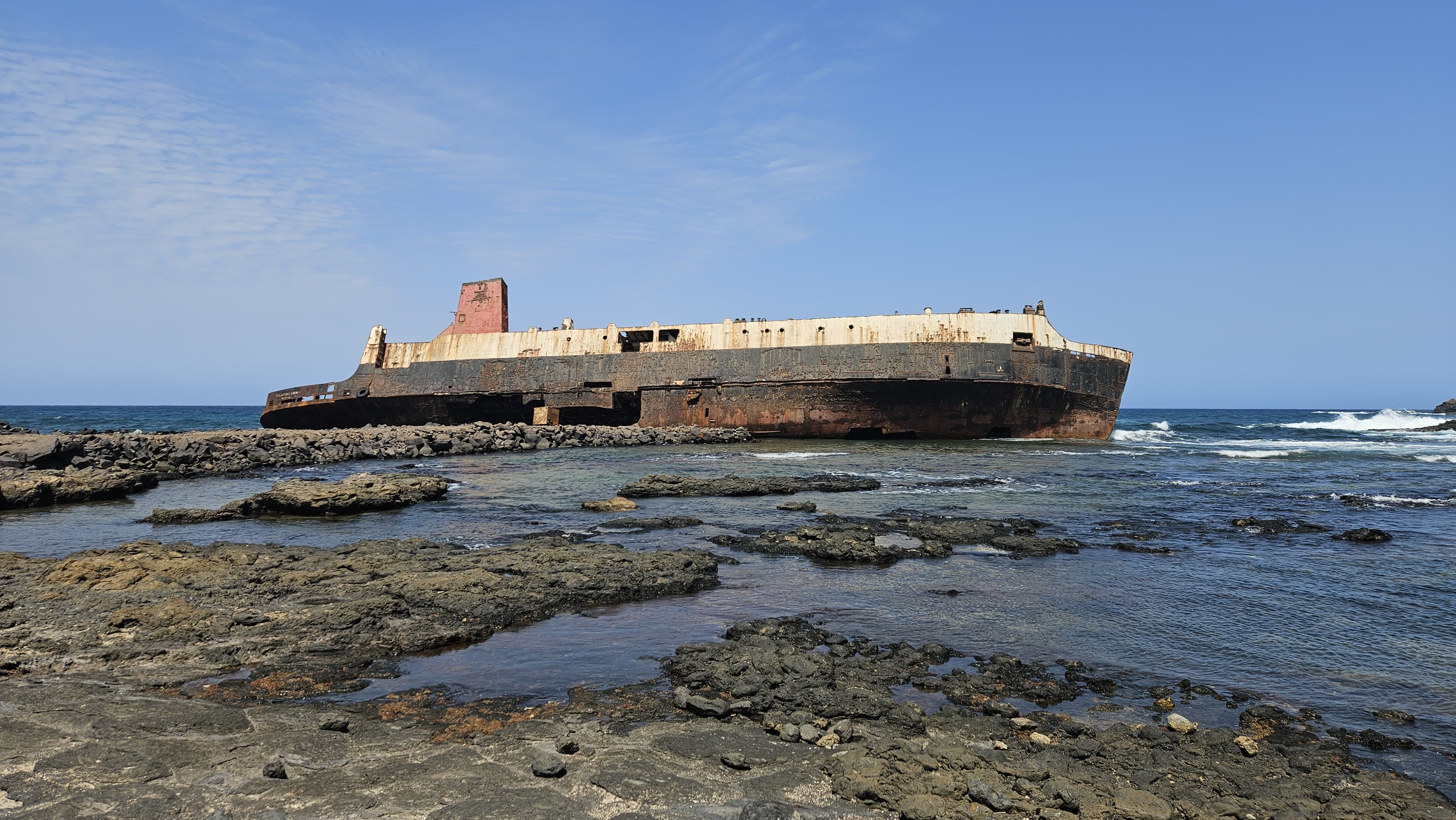
Wreck of Pentalina-B in Moia Moia Bay, Cape Verde, 2025

Iona bore hardly any resemblance to a previous Ailsa car ferry like MV Glen Sannox or the 1964 trio of MacBrayne ferries. The most obvious influence was her intended rival, MV Sound of Jura, built in Norway for Western Ferries in 1968 – the first drive-through ferry in west coast waters.

Iona was ten feet longer than MV Hebrides, and of greater draft, but twin rudders gave her greater manoeuvrability than the earlier MacBrayne ferries. She was the company's first vessel without traditional teak decking. Her vehicle facilities impressed, but passenger accommodation compared poorly with the 1964 ships. She had very little open deck space for passengers. Forward on the boat deck ('B' Deck), there was a full-width lounge for 101 passengers with seating upholstered in blue and purple until they were recovered with vinyl by 1979. High bows obstructed the forward view for seated passengers. Aft of this, a deckhouse held a cafeteria. On the lower deck ('E' Deck'), below the car deck were a smoke-room/bar (no longer used) and crew quarters. Unusually for a large MacBrayne ship, Iona had no sleeping accommodation for passengers.

Iona's main machinery was twin Paxman engines, each driving a fixed-pitch propeller through a gearbox, reducing an engine speed of 900 rpm to a propeller speed of 300 rpm. The first ship in the company's history to have such geared transmission, these gearboxes were a regular source of trouble throughout her career. She was equipped with Denny-Brown retractable stabilisers and a bow-thrust controllable-pitch propeller. Engine Control was possible from the consoles in the engine-room, in the wheelhouse, in the bridge wings, or at the aft end of the navigation bridge deck, for astern working.

Iona's car deck could take vehicles up to 16.5 feet in height and 32-ton in weight. She had a bow visor, a stern-and side-ramps with a hoist that could handle 27.5 tons. Traffic for the hoist was marshalled by automatic barriers. Her bow-visor, raised by a racking system, rather than a hinge, was not watertight, limiting her passenger-carrying capacity later in her career. The bow-ramp was in several sections, which coiled back into the vehicle deck, reducing available car spaces.

== Service ==
for Caledonian MacBrayne:
1970 - 1971	Gourock - Dunoon (charter to CSP)
1972	Stornoway - Kyle - Mallaig
1973	Stornoway - Ullapool
1974 - 1978	Oban - Castlebay - Lochboisdale
1979 - 1990	Kennacraig - Islay
1989 - 1993	Mallaig - Armadale (& - Tobermory - Coll - Tiree)
1994 - 1997	Mallaig - Armadale (& - Castlebay - Lochboisdale)
for Pentland Ferries:
2001 - 2007	Gills Bay - St Margaret's Hope
2006 - 2009	Dover - Dunkerque
April 2009	Kennacraig - Port Askaig
