= MV Pentalina =

Catamaran ferry

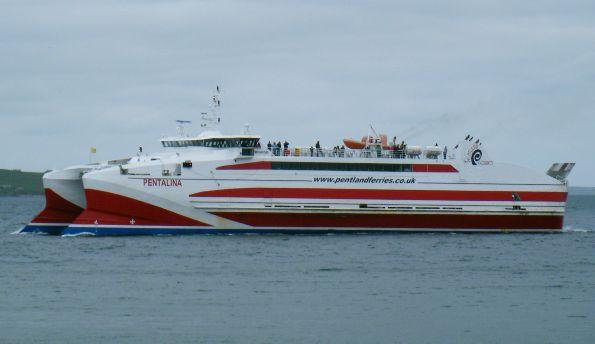
- MV Pentalina approaching Gills Bay

History

United Kingdom
- Name: Pentalina
- Owner: Pentland Ferries
- Port of registry: Kirkwall
- Route: Gills Bay - St Margaret's Hope
- Ordered: 2007
- Builder: FBMA Marine yard, Cebu, Philippines
- Cost: est £10–15 million
- Yard number: 1025
- Laid down: February 2007
- Launched: April 2008
- Maiden voyage: 6 February 2009
- In service: 30 March 2009
- Out of service: 1 November 2019 – 25 April 2023; 30 April 2023 –
- Homeport: Kirkwall
- Identification: MMSI number: 235061705; IMO number: 9437969; Callsign: 2AOW6
- Status: In Service

General characteristics
- Type: Ferry
- Tonnage: 2,382 GT; 360 DWT
- Length: 70 m (229 ft 8 in)
- Beam: 20 m (65 ft 7 in)
- Draft: 2.2 m (7 ft 3 in)
- Speed: 15 knots (28 km/h; 17 mph) (service)
- Capacity: 247 passengers, 70 cars

MV Pentalina is a 70 m (230 ft) RoPax catamaran ferry purchased by Pentland Ferries in 2008 to operate between Gills Bay, Caithness and St Margaret's Hope, Orkney.

== Layout ==
Pentalina was designed by the naval architects Sea Transport Solutions of Australia. The catamaran form has a steel hull with aluminum superstructure. She is designed to handle the rough seas off the north coast of Scotland. Her overall length is 70 m (230 ft), with a beam of 20 m (66 ft).

== Route ==
Pentalina replaced the ferry MV Claymore, crossing the Pentland Firth, between Gills Bay, Caithness and St Margaret's Hope, Orkney. The journey time for the crossing on this vessel is one hour.

== Construction and career ==
Pentalina was built in Cebu, Philippines, starting in February 2007. She was ready to launch in April 2008, although there were delays in installing equipment. The 10,000-mile (16,000 km) journey from the Philippines to Scotland was delayed by bad weather, forcing a short detour to Salalah, Oman. She arrived in St Margaret's Hope on 9 December 2008.

There was proposals of her operating between Gills Bay and Shetland.

Pentland Ferries commissioned a larger catamaran, MV Alfred, to replace Pentalina on the St Margaret's Hope to Gill's Bay route, and the new vessel entered service on 1 November 2019. On 5 July 2022, Alfred ran aground on the island of Swona and Pentland Ferries confirmed that the port bulbous bow had sustained impact damage. Pentalina returned to serve on the St Margaret's Hope– Gill's Bay route while Alfred was in dry dock in Belfast. Alfred returned to service on 12 August 2022.

=== 2023 grounding ===
On 29 April 2023, Pentalina ran aground near St Margaret's Hope. Pentland Ferries stated that smoke was detected in the ship's engine room around 19:30 and she subsequently grounded. The Royal National Lifeboat Institution arrived at the incident, and 60 people were safely evacuated. It was described as a Major Incident by the RMT. Pentalina was moved to her berth, about 90 m (300 ft) away, the next morning and was expected to be out of service for repairs until 21 May 2023.
