= Pentalina =

Pentalina may refer to:

- MV Pentalina
- MV Pentalina-B
- Pentland Ferries
