= MV Alfred =

Catamaran ferry

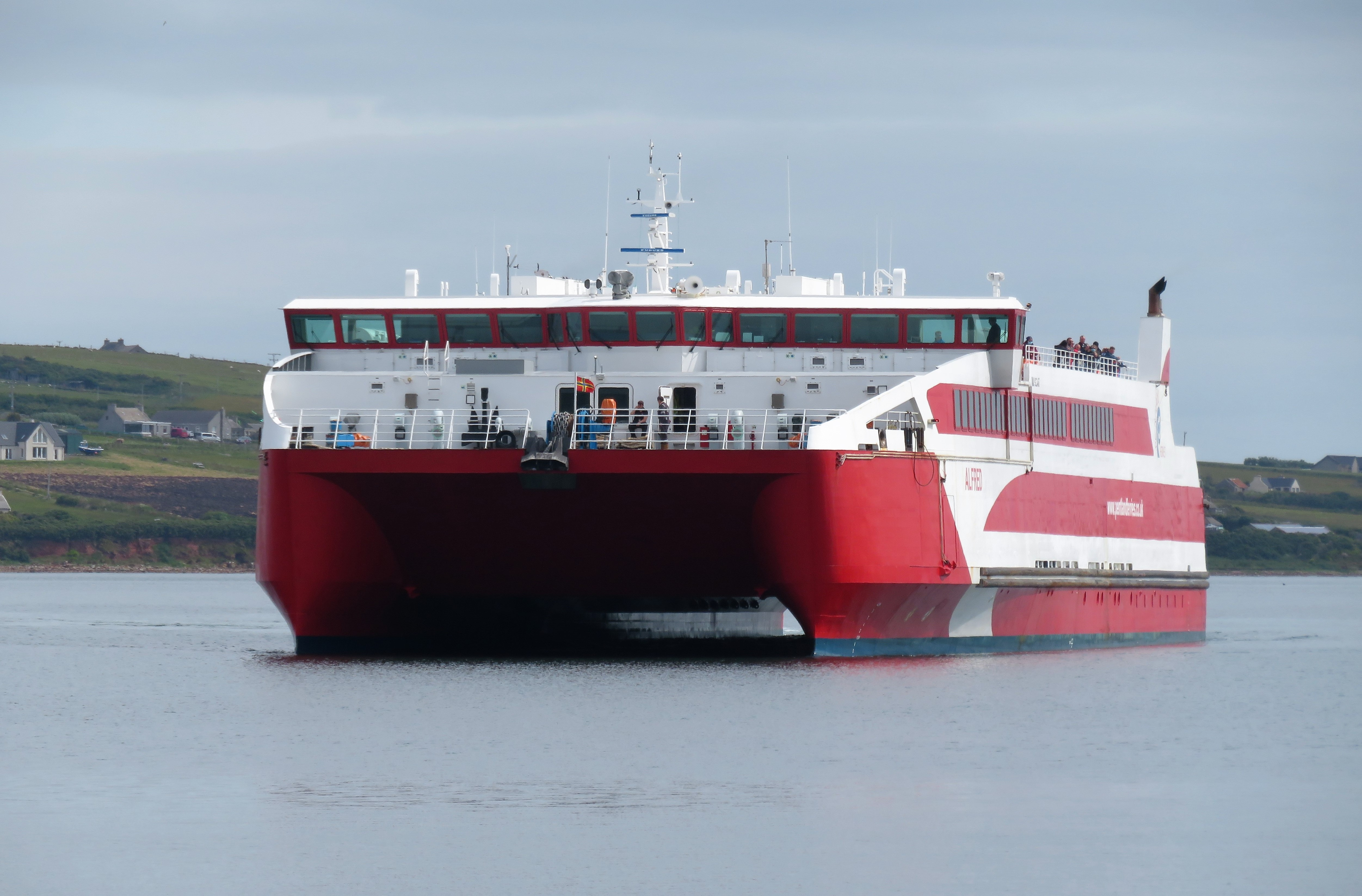
- The Alfred approaches St Margaret's Hope in June 2021

History
- Name: MV Alfred
- Namesake: Andrew Banks' (owner of Pentland Ferries) father
- Owner: Pentland Ferries
- Operator: Caledonian MacBrayne
- Route: Troon - Brodick
- Builder: Strategic Marine Shipyard, Vũng Tàu, Vietnam
- Cost: £14.5 million
- Laid down: April 2017
- Launched: 22 February 2019
- In service: 1 November 2019
- Home port: Kirkwall, Orkney, Scotland

General characteristics
- Type: Ro-Pax Catamaran
- Tonnage: 2,995 GT
- Length: 84.5 m (277 ft)
- Beam: 22 m (72 ft)
- Draft: 2.7 m (9 ft)
- Depth: 5.3 m (17 ft)
- Installed power: Main engines: 4 x Yanmar 6EY17W at 749KW; Generators: 2 x Volvo Penta D9-MG; Bow thrusters: 4 x VETH VT-240 FP
- Propulsion: 4 x fixed pitch propellers
- Speed: 16 knots
- Capacity: 430 passengers; 98 cars, or; 54 cars and 12 trucks; 550t deadweight
- Crew: 12/13
- Notes: Crew cabins:12; Fuel: 50,000 litres; Fresh water: 20,000 litres; Black water: 12,000 litres

MV Alfred is a catamaran ferry owned by Pentland Ferries, currently on charter to Caledonian MacBrayne for its west coast service.

== Background ==
MV Alfred was built in Vũng Tàu, Vietnam, by Strategic Marine Vietnam at a cost of £14.5 million, and launched on 22 February 2019. Designed with a capacity of 430 passengers and 98 cars, Alfred is described by their owner as the most environmentally friendly ferry in Scotland, claiming the diesel-powered ship is "more than 60 per cent more efficient in terms of fuel consumption and emission levels than other comparable ferries operating in Scotland". In 2020, Pentland Ferries became the first ferry operator in the UK to win a Green Tourism Award for the Alfred.

Upon completing sea trials, Alfred departed Vũng Tàu, Vietnam, on 29 August 2019 and arrived in St Margaret's Hope, Orkney, Scotland, on 9 October 2019, entering service on the Caithness and Orkney route on 1 November 2019.

== Isle of Swona grounding ==
At about 14:00 on 5 July 2022, Alfred grounded on the uninhabited island of Swona while en route from Gills Bay to St Margaret's Hope. It resulted in damage to the port bulbous bow and no reported water ingress. There were 84 passengers and 13 crew on board at the time of grounding. Some passengers sustained injuries, such as fractures, sprains and soft tissue damage; one passenger was hospitalised.

Alfred was refloated within one and a half hours, and taken to Orkney under her own power under escort of two lifeboats and two tugs. She was taken off service until 18 July 2022.

== CalMac Ferries charter ==
In March 2023, the Scottish Government announced that it had chartered Alfred for nine months to supplement the Caledonian MacBrayne fleet, at a cost of £9 million. The charter was due to start on 18 April 2023, but was delayed for a week due to MV Pentalina being unable to get her Passenger Ship Safety Certificate in time; she received a temporary one and resumed service on 26 April 2023, allowing Alfred to be released to her charter.

After completing berthing trials across the CalMac network, Alfred was laid up at Ayr in order to carry out repairs to her hydraulics system and make adjustments to her stern ramp. During this time, she was off hire from her charter.

On 11 May 2023, CalMac confirmed that she had completed berthing trials at Lochmaddy, Ullapool, Port Askaig, Brodick, Ardrossan (only the Irish berth), Troon and Campbeltown. However, she could not operate out of Port Askaig at the time due to a technical issue with her starboard thruster. As a result, CalMac initially deployed her on the Ardrossan to Brodick route from 12 May 2023, carrying out two return sailings to Arran per day for the first two weeks. After which, she began the schedule of three return sailings to Arran Friday to Monday, and two Tuesday to Thursday. From 10 August, there was an additional return sailing on Thursdays.

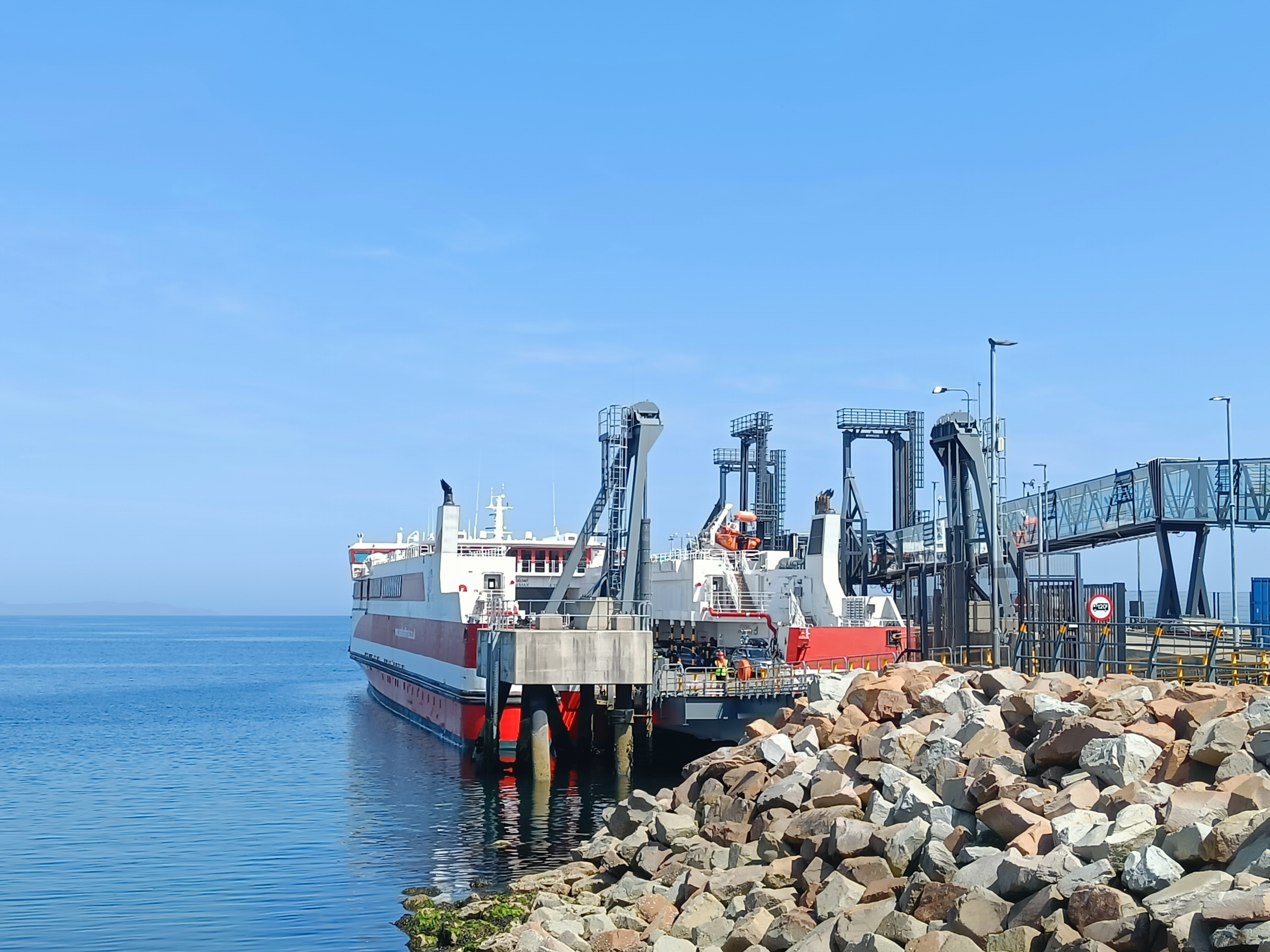
Alongside at Brodick, Isle of Arran, in May 2023

During September 2023, it was announced that Alfred would undergo further berthing trials in Stornoway at the end of the month, after finishing the peak summer season second vessel duties at Arran. If successful, she would have carried out the freight sailings there whilst MV Arrow was unavailable and Loch Seaforth was at annual overhaul. The berthing trial was postponed as Alfred was broken down in Ayr with a gearbox problem. Her berthing trials at Stornoway were unsuccessful. On 27 October 2023, CalMac assigned Alfred back to the Arran route for her next period of resilience operations beginning on 4 November 2023, releasing MV Caledonian Isles for berthing trials for services to Islay, Colonsay, Mull, Coll and Tiree.

On 6 November 2023, Alfred's charter to CalMac was extended by six months to last until 21 August 2024. She will also undergo ramp modifications so that she will be suitable for service to Campbeltown and Troon from Islay. Retail and catering options are also being looked at.

On 8 November 2023, it was announced that due to a technical issue with MV Loch Portain, Alfred will take up service on the temporary Tarbert - Lochmaddy route. On 10 November, after completing three services on the route, CalMac announced that Alfred would return to Arran for a temporary period owing to MV Caledonian Isles having a steering fault.

On 18 December 2023, CalMac announced that Alfred would remain on the Tarbert - Lochmaddy service for an indefinite period of time as a contingency measure. In January 2024, she returned to Ardrossan to serve Arran alongside MV Isle of Arran, relieving MV Caledonian Isles for her annual dry-docking.

In February 2024, the Irish berth at Ardrossan closed permanently owing to safety concerns, forcing Alfred to operate her daily services to Brodick from Troon, initially carrying freight only. From 29 March 2024, Alfred began to operate a regular passenger service from Troon to Brodick, albeit not carrying motorhomes, campervans, caravans or coaches due to infrastructure restrictions. A shuttle bus service was also introduced to connect Troon railway station to the ferry terminal.

On 9 July 2024, CalMac announced a further extension of the charter to March 2025 to provide additional resilience. In addition, CalMac announced that Alfred had undergone ramp modifications, allowing her to carry all vehicles except for motorhomes over six metres in length and caravans.

On 26 February 2025, CalMac announced a further extension of the charter to May 2025, owing to MV Caledonian Isles requiring additional remedial work to her propeller shaft tubes.

On 3 June 2025, Pentland Ferries announced that Alfred's charter to CalMac had been extended for further fleet resilience, with Alfred expected to serve Brodick from Troon partnering MV Glen Sannox.

In May 2026, the charter was extended, with Alfred to continue serving Arran from Troon while MV Glen Sannox became a relief vessel based at Stornoway in Lewis.
