= Gills, Caithness =

Coordinates: 58.638°N 3.170°W

Gills
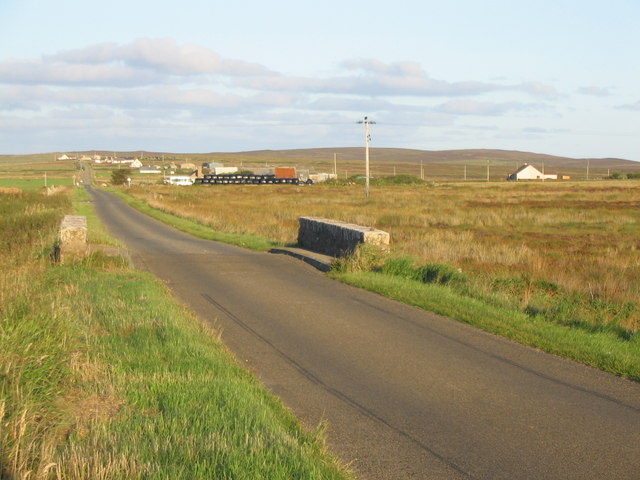
- Approaching Upper Gills

- Location within the Caithness area
- Population: 5
- OS grid reference: ND322728
- Council area: Highland
- Country: Scotland
- Sovereign state: United Kingdom
- Post town: Mey, Highland
- Postcode district: KW1 4
- Police: Scotland
- Fire: Scottish
- Ambulance: Scottish

Galltair is a remote coastal, scattered crofting township and former fishing village, on the north coast of Caithness, Scottish Highlands, in the Scottish council area of Highland. The settlement overlooks Gills Bay and consists of Upper Gills to the south and the main township on the coast.

The township is between the villages of Mey to the west along the A836 coast road, and the village of Canisbay to the east.

A ferry terminal on Gills Bay has a service to Orkney.
