= Swona =

Uninhabited island in the Pentland Firth off the north coast of Scotland

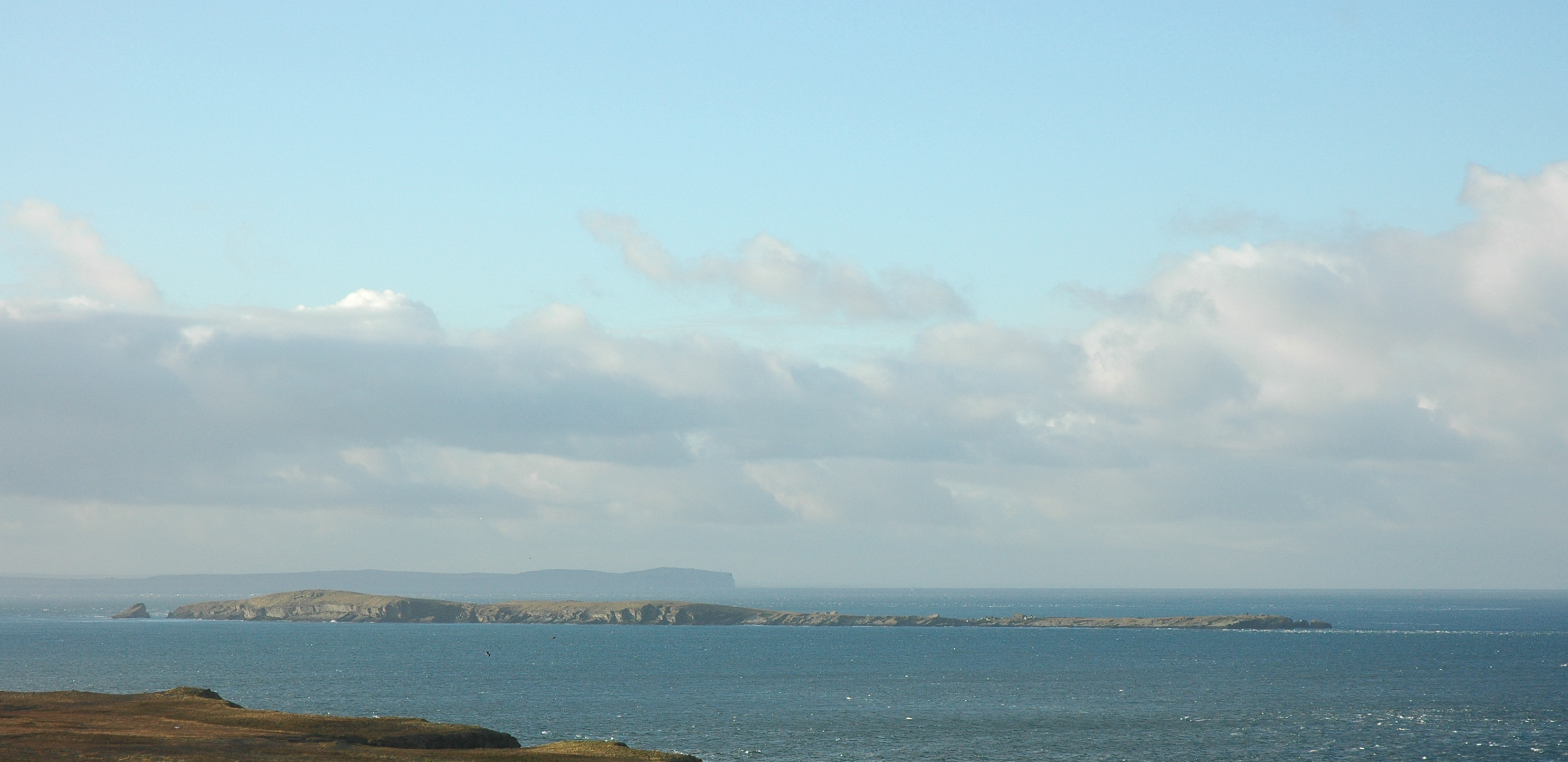
- Swona, viewed from South Ronaldsay

Location
- Swona shown within Orkney
- OS grid reference: ND387844
- Coordinates: 58.74279°N 3.05815°W

Name
- Name meaning: Sweyn's Island; Pig/whale island
- Old Norse name: Svíney; Swefney

Physical geography
- Island group: Orkney
- Area: 92 ha (230 acres)
- Area rank: 153
- Highest elevation: Warbister Hill 41 m (135 ft)

Administration
- Council area: Orkney Islands
- Country: Scotland
- Sovereign state: United Kingdom

Demographics
- Population: 0
- Swona Lighthouse
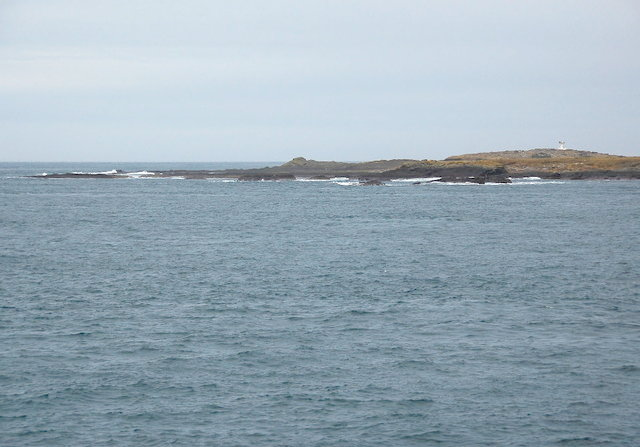
- The beacon on The Tarf, Swona
- Coordinates: 58.737451°N 3.070497°W
- Constructed: 1906 (first)
- Foundation: concrete base
- Construction: concrete tower (current) cast iron tower (first)
- Automated: 1983
- Height: 8 m (26 ft)
- Shape: quadrangular tower with external ladder, balcony and light
- Markings: white tower
- Power source: solar power
- Operator: Northern Lighthouse Board
- First lit: 1983 (current)
- Deactivated: 1983 (first)
- Focal height: 17 m (56 ft)
- Range: 9 nmi (17 km; 10 mi)
- Characteristic: Fl W 8s.

Swona is an uninhabited privately owned island in the Pentland Firth off the north coast of Scotland. It has a herd of feral cattle resulting from the abandonment of stock in 1974.

== Geography and geology ==
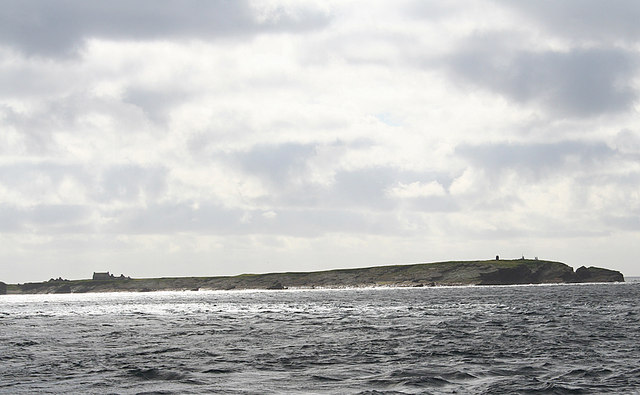
Approaching the north head of Swona. Several houses can clearly be seen.

Swona is the more northerly of two islands in the Pentland Firth between the Orkney Islands and Caithness on the Scottish mainland. It lies in the southern approach to Scapa Flow, west of South Ronaldsay.

Situated in the tidal stream of the Pentland Firth, a tidal race is present at both the north and south ends of the island, being minimal briefly at the turn of the tide. Between the races is a calm eddy which extends down-tide as the tide strengthens. The races are highly visible, with over-falls and whirlpools. Large swell waves can also be present, especially in bad weather conditions. When entering or leaving the eddies crossing the races, even large powerful vessels can be pushed off course, such is the demarcation between the relatively calm eddy and the fast-moving tide in the races.

Swona is about 1 1/4 miles (2.0 kilometres) long by about 1/2 mile (800 m) wide, with a maximum height of approximately 41 m (135 ft) and an area of about 92 hectares (230 acres). It is made up of Old Red Sandstone with cliffs on the east coast.

It is administered as part of the Orkney Islands, while Stroma, to the south, is part of the Highland Region (although traditionally part of Caithness). There is no regular access to the island, however, the Pentland Ferries sailing from Gills Bay, near John o' Groats, to St Margaret's Hope usually passes close to the island, dependent on the tidal direction at the time.

In 2005 Swona was owned by two Orkney farmers, but not worked due to difficulty of access. It is a SSSI (Site of Special Scientific Interest) conservation area with a number of rare plants.

== History ==
The island takes its name from Old Norse, Svíney or Swefney, meaning either "Swine Isle" or "Sweyn's Isle". There is a similarly named island, Svínoy, in the Faroe Islands.

There are prehistoric, pre-Norse and Norse remains on the island. More recent crofting settlement remains include a herd of feral cattle. The island was populated from around 500 BC until 1974.

Boats were built on the island for a number of years. The last of these, the Hood can be seen pulled well up the shingle beach by the landing stage. It is no longer seaworthy, having a hole in it caused by the feral cows using it as a rubbing post. The landing stage and boat can be seen briefly in passing through a gap in the rocks near the north end of the island on the east side. The last house to be occupied can also be seen in this area.

The island was the site of many shipwrecks caused by the strong currents in the Pentland Firth. In 1931, a 6,000 ton Danish freighter called Pennsylvania was wrecked on the island. The Orkney newspaper of the time said that it was one of the most richly-laden ships that was ever wrecked in the area. After some salvaging, the wreck was finally bought by a syndicate of Stroma and Swona men.

The Swona Minor light was built in 1906 on the south west tip of Swona. It was originally a cast iron tower but was replaced by a reinforced concrete square tower sometime in the 1980s. The earlier Stroma Lighthouse was built in 1896 and stands at the northern end of the Island of Stroma.

In summer 1973 Arthur Rosie left the island and died shortly afterwards. James and Violet Rosie (brother and sister) left in March 1974. James had Parkinsons Disease and died c. 1976 of a perforated stomach ulcer. Violet died c. 1984 in South Ronaldsay. They returned only periodically to the island. Many of the houses, while in a state of dilapidation, are as they were left, with various possessions still to be seen where they were left.

Swona is one of the locations described in Cal Flyn's Islands of Abandonment: Life in the Post-Human Landscape (2020, William Collins: ISBN 978-0008329761).

In July 2022 the Pentland Ferries' MV Alfred, running between Gills Bay and St Margaret's Hope, grounded on Swona. Alfred was refloated within one and a half hours.

== Wildlife ==
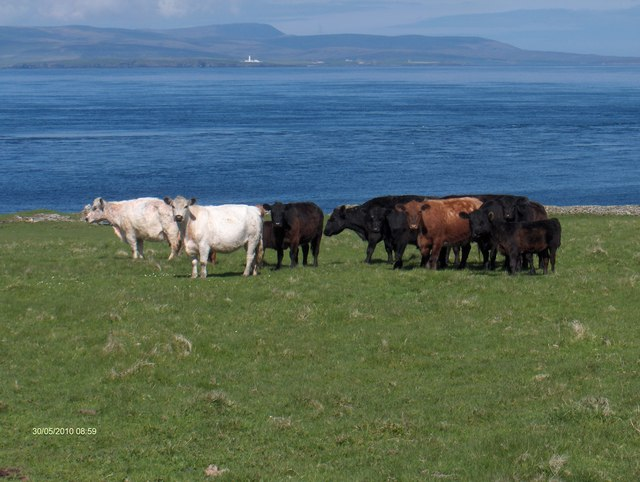
Swona cattle in 2010

When the population departed they left a herd of beef cattle – eight cows and one bull (Shorthorn - Aberdeen-Angus cross). Five generations later, in 2004, the herd which had turned feral was still going strong, and is now classified as a new breed in the World Dictionary of Livestock Breeds. It then consisted of ten bulls, four cows and two calves. Two calves are born each spring, although not all live to maturity. The herd gets no additional feed, although it is checked by a vet each year. The animals are self-selecting for hardiness, easy calving, and low-maintenance, feeding off the grass and seaweed.

Having been separated from the mainland for so long, they are completely disease-free, and have reverted to wild behaviour. Because of this, DNA samples have been taken, from the ears of some of the cattle that died. In the summer the main herd is usually in the centre of the island. By 2012 the herd had settled to an average of seventeen animals. This appears to be around the maximum number that the island can support. In 2017 The BBC documentary series Britain's Ancient Capital: Secrets of Orkney briefly visited Swona; Chris Packham counted twenty cows and calves and three bulls.

=== Birds ===
The island is part of the Pentland Firth Islands Site of Special Scientific Interest (SSSI) and is home to thousands of breeding seabirds, including Arctic terns, which have a colony on the northern part of the island, and Atlantic puffins, which burrow into the hillside. It is also part of the Pentland Firth Islands Important Bird Area (IBA), so designated by BirdLife International because it supports significant breeding populations of seabirds.

== See also ==
- List of lighthouses in Scotland
- List of Northern Lighthouse Board lighthouses

== Bibliography ==
- John S. Findlay, A Photographic Portrait of Swona, Galaha Press, Kirkwall, 2010.
- John S. Findlay, Swona revisited, Galaha Press, Kirkwall, 2014.
