= Pentland Firth =

Strait between the Orkney Islands and Caithness in the north of Scotland

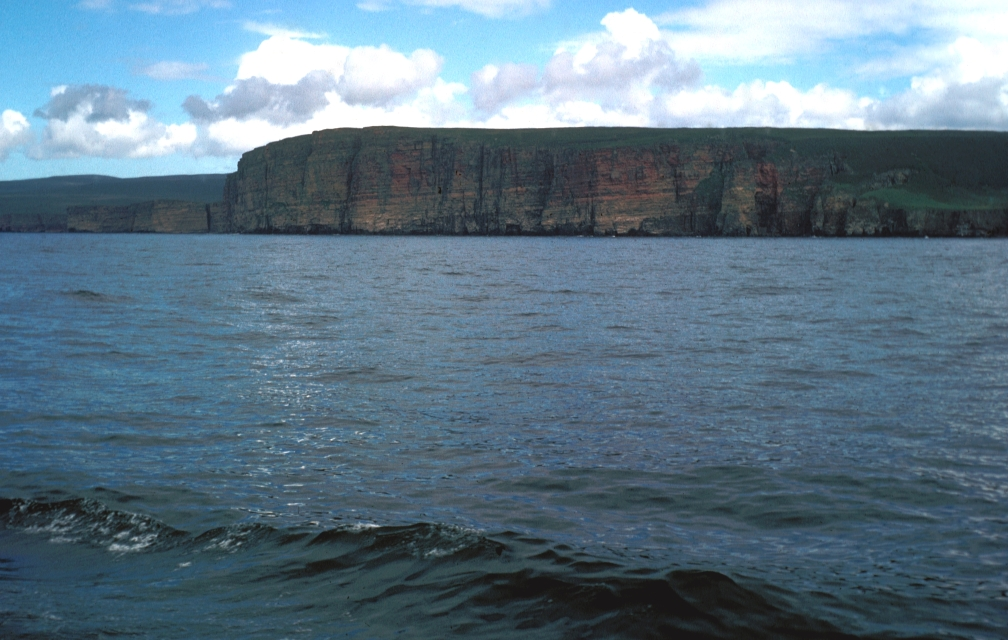
- Looking across the waters of the Pentland Firth to the island of Hoy in Orkney

- Location in Scotland
- Location: Scotland, UK
- Coordinates: 58.7°N 3.2°W

The Pentland Firth (Scottish Gaelic: An Caol Arcach, meaning the Orcadian Strait) is a strait which separates the Orkney Islands from Caithness in the north of Scotland. To the west is the Atlantic Ocean, with the North Sea to the east.

Despite the name, it is not a firth in the common meaning of a broad estuary or fjord.

== Etymology ==
The name is presumed to be derived from of the Old Norse "Petlandsfjörð", meaning "the fjord of Pictland", and is completely unrelated to the Pentland Hills near Edinburgh.

Prior to the Norse occupation of Orkney the strait was known as the "Sea of Orcs" – a reference to the Pictish tribe who inhabited Orkney. Such was their marine prowess that there are also instances of this name referring to the sea lanes of the entire west coast of Scotland down to Kintyre. One version of the 9th-century Historia Brittonum states that "the Britons originally filled the whole island with their peoples from the English Channel to the Sea of Orcs".

== Geography ==
On the Caithness (southern) side the Firth extends from Dunnet Head in the west to Duncansby Head in the east, while on the Orkney (northern) side from Tor Ness on Hoy in the west to Old Head on South Ronaldsay in the east.

In the middle of the Firth are two significant islands, Stroma and Swona. The small Pentland Skerries group are in the east. The islands of Hoy and South Ronaldsay border the firth to the north and are part of the Orkney Islands.

The most northerly point of the headland of Dunnet Head, Easter Head, is also that of mainland Britain. John o' Groats, Mey (site of the Castle of Mey), and many smaller villages are also to be found on the Caithness side, as are the town of Thurso and Scrabster Harbour in Thurso Bay, on the western fringe of the Firth.

== Crossing the Firth ==
In the West the ferry from Scrabster to Stromness operated by NorthLink is the oldest continuous ferry service across the firth by the ferry MV Hamnavoe, started in 1856 as a continuation of the railhead at Thurso. The Far North Line opened 28 July 1874

Historically the Gills Bay area has been the main setting off point from the mainland to the islands of Stroma and Swona and Orkney itself. At present Pentland Ferries operate on this route from Gills Bay to St Margaret's Hope on South Ronaldsay.

At the eastern end John o' Groats Ferries sail to Burwick, also on South Ronaldsay. This is a small passenger ferry which ran in the summer months only. It did not run in the 2024 season.

Consideration was also given to construction of a tunnel linking the islands to the mainland. The 10-mile (16 km) tunnel was initially projected to have cost £100 million based on preliminary studies carried out in 2005 but as of 2012 no further progress had been made.

The first recorded swim across the Pentland Firth was by Coleen Blair in 2011. It has since been swum by others including Andrea Gellan (2011; fastest swim) Mark Cameron (2018) and Alison Lievesley (2020)

== Tidal races ==
The Firth is well known for the strength of its tidal currents, which are among the fastest in the world, a speed of 30 kilometres per hour (16 kn) being reported close west of Pentland Skerries. The force of the tides gives rise to overfalls and tidal races which can occur at different stages of the tide. Combined with gale-force winds, they often give rise to extremely violent sea conditions, which have caused accidents such as the 2015 sinking of the cargo ship MV Cemfjord that resulted in the death of eight crew members.

Some of the principal tidal races are:

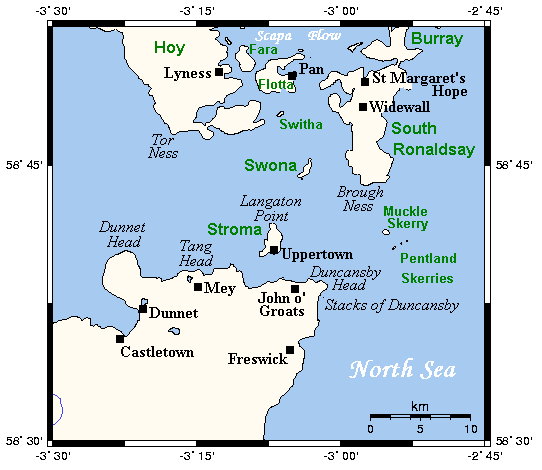
Map of the Pentland Firth and associated lands

- ‘The Merry Men of Mey’. Forms off St John's point in the west-going stream and extends as the tide increases NNW across the firth to Tor Ness. The worst part is over a sand wave field about 5.5 kilometres (3.4 mi) west of Stroma. The waves formed by this race form a natural breakwater with relatively calm water to the east of it, particularly noticeable when a westerly swell is running. Tides in this area can exceed 19 km/h (10 kn).
- ‘The Swelkie’. The race at the north end of Stroma, off Swelkie Point is known as "The Swelkie". It extends from the point in an easterly or westerly direction depending on the tide and can be particularly violent. The whirlpool, according to a Nordic tradition recorded in the Eddas, is caused by two gýgjar named Fenja and Menja turning the millstone Grótti, which grinds out the ocean's salt. The witches 'Grotti Finnie' and 'Grotti Minnie' feature in later Orcadian and Shetlandic folklore. The name of the race is derived from Old Norse: Svelgr, meaning "the Swallower".
- The ‘Duncansby Race’ forms off Ness of Duncansby at the start of the SE-going tidal stream (flood). Initially extending ENE but wheeling gradually anti-clockwise until it extends about 1.5 kilometres (0.93 mi) NW some 2 1/2 h later at which point it is known as ‘The Boars of Duncansby’. During the time of the SE stream there is additional turbulence off Duncansby Head, particularly to the East. The race temporarily ceases at the turn of the tide before forming in an ENE direction in the NW-going tidal stream (ebb) before ceasing again at the next turn of the tide. The race is particularly violent and dangerous when the tidal stream is opposed by gales in the opposite direction. During the east-going stream a race forms off Ness of Huna. This race can be particularly violent in an easterly or southeasterly gale.
- The ‘Liddel Eddy’ forms between South Ronaldsay and Muckle Skerry in the East-going stream (flood). A race also forms for part of the time off Old Head at the SE part of South Ronaldsay.

In addition to ‘The Swelkie’, races form at both the north and south ends of Stroma and Swona. Between the races there is a calm eddy which extends down tide as the tide strengthens. The races are highly visible with overfalls and whirlpools. Large swell waves can also be present, especially in bad weather conditions. When entering or leaving the eddies, crossing the races, even large powerful vessels can be pushed off course, such is the demarcation between the relatively calm eddy and the fast-moving tide in the races. There are other races in the firth particularly off Brough Head.

== Tidal power ==
Currents of up to 5 metres per second (11 mph) make the Pentland Firth potentially one of the best sites in the world for tidal power. This has taken on a political dimension. The SNP Energy Review of July 2006 claimed that the Firth could produce "10 to 20 GW of synchronous electricity" and First Minister Alex Salmond claimed that the Pentland Firth could be "the Saudi Arabia of tidal power" with an output of "20 gigawatts and more than that". In July 2013 Thomas Adcock of Oxford University stated that the Firth "is almost certainly the best site for tidal stream power in the world" although a peer-reviewed study he led suggested that the maximum potential of the Firth was 1.9 GW of tidal power, with one GW being a more realistic figure.

In October 2008 tidal power developer Atlantis Resources Corporation (ARC) announced it was considering a site near the Castle of Mey for a computer data centre that would be powered by a tidal scheme in the Firth. In October 2010 MeyGen, a consortium of ARC, Morgan Stanley and International Power, received operational lease from the Crown Estate to a 400 MW project for 25 years. Consent was granted in September 2013 for MeyGen to build a 9 MW demonstration project of six AR1000 turbines commissioning in 2015 with 86 MW planned for phase 1 by 2020. The second phase would install up to 400 turbines generating 398 MW.

MeyGen completed the longest-ever run of continuous tidal electricity generation in 2019 with 25 GWh produced, enough to power nearly 4,000 homes. In 2025 Meygen announced that they had kept four turbines running for six 1/2 years in the inner sound of the Pentland Firth between Stroma Island and the Scottish Mainland 40 metres (44 yards) beneath to ocean surface. The four turbines were producing 6 Megawatts, enough to power 7,000 homes continuously. Meygen planned to add more turbines in 2030 once the Scottish electricity grid had been upgraded. The trade association Ocean Energy Europe said the length of time these turbines have been able to run without needing to be removed for maintenance is a crucial step to commercial viability of tidal power projects.

== Marine wildlife ==
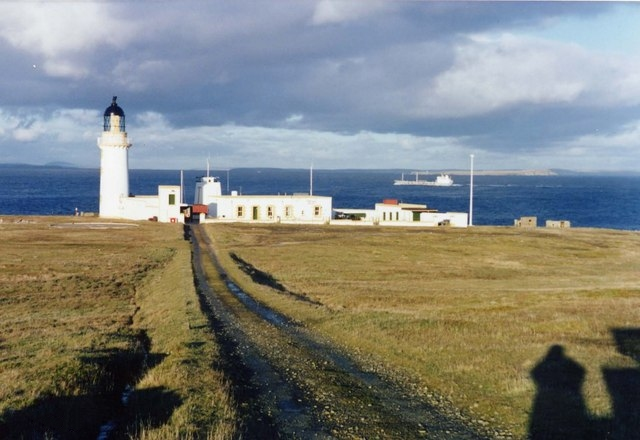
Stroma Lighthouse

Seals can be seen at all times of the year in all parts of the firth. They usually bask on the rocks on the ebb (falling) tide since it saves them having to move as the water rises. Large groups of seals can be seen at the north of Stroma, from the lighthouse round to the north-west part of the island and at the south end in the area of the beacon and to the east between the old jetty and the lighthouse. On Swona they can be seen around the midpoint of the west coast. The common seal come in various colours with spots and have their pups in May, June and July. They are of a similar colour to the adults and can swim from birth, The grey seal, which is more common in this area having one of the largest British populations, also comes in a number of colours and live in colonies giving birth to white pups from October through to January. These pups do not swim at first until they shed their white coat. When giving birth seals can often be seen inland.

Porpoises can be seen all year round in all parts of the firth although they tend to favour shallower water. They grow to about 1.5 m and are black with a broad based triangular fin which can be seen as they surface. They have a small, rotund body with a short, blunt head, no beak, and a small, triangular dorsal fin. They are usually seen singly or in small numbers although in the autumn many groups may be seen in Gills Bay. When in groups, they tend to swim in a more random fashion than dolphins who swim together.

Dolphins are not very common but seen from time to time. Many different types visit the firth and may be seen anywhere at any time. Larger than porpoises, 2–3 m depending on the type, black, with the rear edge of the fin curved back at the top unlike the straight edge of the porpoise. Head has a distinct beak. Often swim alongside the bow of vessels and frolic in the bow waves. Probably more than one usually swimming together in a more synchronised manner, sometimes leaping out of the water.

Killer whales are mostly seen around May to July although may be sighted at any time of the year. Usually swim in a pod of a maximum of from six to twelve individuals led by a matriarchal female. Males can grow up to 9 m long and can be about 25% larger than females and juveniles in the pod. They tend to be fairly distinctive due to their size, fin and markings. The male has a very tall, triangular and erect dorsal fin which is sometimes tilted forwards. Juveniles and adult females both have a smaller, sickle-shaped dorsal fin. When surfacing the grey saddle shows up over the black back, behind the dorsal fin. It has a conical-shaped black head, with a distinctive white oval patch above and behind the eye, an indistinct beak, white throat and large paddle-shaped flippers.

Minke whales are quite often seen in June and occasionally through to October but also at other times of the year. Tend to feed in the up-welling water of the tidal races but can be seen elsewhere. Usually seen singly but may be in pairs. Grows to 7–8.5 m, black with diagonal white band on flipper and a slender, pointed triangular head. Relatively small dorsal fin curved back at top at rear part of body. Will probably see the long back with small fin to rear breaking the surface although they are known to bow and stern ride the waves of vessels.

Basking shark. Rare but being seen more often around May to August. A fish rather than a marine mammal, it spends most of its time cruising on the surface filter feeding. The dorsal fin can be seen moving steadily through the water with the tip of the tail moving from side to side behind it. Usually seen feeding inshore at high tide around here in the Gills Bay, Stroma, area though may be seen in deeper water. Generally around 8 m long, greyish brown to bluish black with pale belly. Seen in northern waters in the summer, southern in winter. Often in groups of three or four.

Turtles. Very rarely seen, however, they are occasionally found caught in fishing nets in this area. The leatherback is the most frequently recorded species in UK waters and probably the only one in this area. Grows to about 2.9 m with an elongated black shell spotted with white, which tapers to a blunt spike. Migrates to UK waters from the tropics in the summer to feed on jellyfish. There are four other species less frequently encountered in UK waters where they usually occur as stray juveniles carried by currents from warmer seas.

== See also ==
- Gulf of Corryvreckan
- Renewable energy in Scotland

== Bibliography ==
- Watson, W. J. (1994) The Celtic Place-Names of Scotland. Edinburgh; Birlinn. ISBN 1-84158-323-5. First published in Edinburgh; The Royal Celtic Society, 1926.
