= MV Cowal =

History

United Kingdom
- Name: MV Cowal
- Namesake: Cowal peninsula
- Operator: Caledonian Steam Packet Company
- Port of registry: Glasgow, Scotland
- Route: 1954 – 1977: Clyde service
- Builder: Ailsa Shipbuilding Company, Troon; Engine Builders: British Polar Engines
- Cost: £257,960
- Yard number: 480
- Launched: 20 January 1954; by Lady Bilsland
- In service: Easter 1954
- Out of service: 20 May 1977
- Fate: Broken up 1984

General characteristics
- Tonnage: 569 GT
- Length: 186 ft (57 m)
- Beam: 36 ft (11 m)
- Draught: 7.5 ft (2.3 m)
- Installed power: 2x Oil Atlas 2SCSA 6 cyl. 340 x 570mm
- Propulsion: twin screws and rudders
- Speed: 14 knots
- Capacity: 650 passengers; 34 cars

MV Cowal was a hoist-loading vehicle ferry introduced by Caledonian Steam Packet Company in 1954. She spent the whole of her 24 years with Caledonian MacBrayne on the Upper Clyde crossings.

== History ==
MV Cowal was the second of a trio of vehicle vessels ordered in 1951 to modernise the Clyde fleet. Three "general purpose" vessels were planned for the Clyde routes of their names, MV Arran, MV Bute and MV Cowal. Built by Ailsa Shipbuilding Company, Cowal was launched at Troon on 20 January 1954.

On 1 January 1973, the Caledonian Steam Packet Company and MacBrayne fleets combined under one management. Cowal was the last vessel to receive the new Caledonian MacBrayne livery, retaining the vivid CSP yellow funnel until 1974.

After 24 years' service, she was laid up in East India Harbour, Greenock from early June 1977. Surviving a galley-fire on 9 June, she was moved to the James Watt Dock in 1978 and offered for sale. Increasingly forlorn and cannibalised for parts to keep Arran running, Cowal was finally sold to Phetouris Ferries in Greece on 5 January 1979, and left under tow for Perama on 15 May. Despite the tow parting in the Bay of Biscay, she arrived in Piraeus, and was advertised, as Med Star, to take up service across the southern Adriatic, from Otranto to Igoumenitsa. Phetouris died in 1983 and his vision for the former Cowal and MV Bute was never progressed. Med Star was sold for scrap in December 1983, and broken up the following year.

== Layout ==
MV Cowal was virtually identical to her older sister, MV Arran. Cowal was the first Clyde vessel to enter service with radar. Passenger accommodation consisted of a large lounge and a tearoom above, and a bar below, the car deck. The bridge was above the upper deck, allowing passengers unobstructed views forward. Officer and crew accommodation was below the bridge and at the stern. She was fitted with electric hoists and side-ramps to allow the loading of vehicles from conventional piers and at any state of tide. The 14-ton cargo lift had space for five average cars, which were turned on two 14-foot turntables on the lift and a further one at the front of the "garage". An aft cargo hold had two 7-ton derricks for cargo handling. These were removed in 1958 and the hold plated over, to provide additional car deck area.

== Service ==
MV Cowal entered service on the Gourock to Dunoon crossing in 1954. She inaugurated the regular Wemyss Bay to Rothesay car ferry service, on 1 October 1954 and remained in the upper Clyde for her whole career. From 1957 the three sisters were working interchangeably.

In May 1970, Cowal inaugurated a short-lived seasonal Fairlie-Tarbert-Brodick service. When this ended in September 1971, Cowal operated between Largs and Millport, until displaced in March 1972 by the former Skye ferry MV Coruisk on the quicker Largs to Cumbrae Slip run. With linkspans at Gourock and Dunoon, the hoist-loading Bute and Cowal were restricted to the Wemyss Bay to Rothesay crossing, where Cowal spent her last five years. From 1974 to 1977, she assisted with a contract to service Sir Robert McAlpine's oil platform construction yard at Ardyne. After this ended, she retired from the Rothesay service on 20 May 1977 and was laid up at Greenock's East India Harbour from early June 1977.
