= MV Bute (1954) =

History

United Kingdom
- Name: MV Bute
- Namesake: Isle of Bute
- Operator: Caledonian Steam Packet Company
- Port of registry: Glasgow, United Kingdom
- Route: 1954 – 1978: Clyde service
- Builder: Ailsa Shipbuilding Company, Troon; Engine Builders: British Polar Engines
- Cost: £257,960
- Yard number: 481
- Launched: 28 September 1954; by Mrs W P Allen
- In service: 6 December 1954
- Out of service: 21 October 1978
- Fate: Sold 5 November 1979; Scrapped 1984-85

General characteristics
- Tonnage: 569 GT
- Length: 186 ft (57 m)
- Beam: 36 ft (11 m)
- Draught: 7.5 ft (2.3 m)
- Installed power: 2x Oil Atlas 2SCSA 6 cyl. 340 x 570mm
- Propulsion: twin screws and rudders
- Speed: 14 knots
- Capacity: 399 passengers; 30 cars

MV Bute was a Clyde vehicle ferry introduced by Caledonian Steam Packet Company in 1954. She spent 24 years on the Upper Clyde crossings. During her final years with Calmac, she relieved in the west highlands.

== History ==
MV Bute was the last of a trio of vehicle vessels ordered in 1951 to modernise the Clyde fleet. Three "general purpose" vessels were planned for the Clyde routes of their names, MV Arran, MV Bute and MV Cowal. Built by Ailsa Shipbuilding Company, she was launched from their Troon yard on 28 September 1954.

After 24 years' service, she was laid up in Greenock's James Watt Dock in late 1978 and was still there the following spring. In November 1979, she was sold to Gerasinos Phetouris of Greece. As Med Sun, registered in Piraeus, she left the Clyde, on 17 June 1980, under tow, for the Adriatic. Phetouris died in 1983 and his vision for her and MV Cowal was never progressed. The former Clyde ferry was broken up in 1984–85.

== Layout ==
MV Bute's passenger accommodation consisted of a large lounge and a tearoom above, and a bar below, the car deck. The bridge was above the upper deck, allowing passengers unobstructed views forward. Officer and crew accommodation was below the bridge and at the stern. She was fitted with electric hoists and side-ramps to allow the loading of vehicles from conventional piers and at any state of tide. The 14-ton cargo lift had space for five average cars, which were turned on two 14-foot turntables on the lift and a further one at the front of the "garage". An aft cargo hold had two 7-ton derricks for cargo handling. These were removed in 1958 and the hold plated over, to provide additional car deck area.

In 1975, Bute's lift-supports were extended to allow her hoist to be raised an additional four feet for service at Mallaig. For her final service, a door was cut in her side ramp, allowing access to flit boats on the Small Isles run.

== Service ==
MV Bute entered service on the Rothesay service in 1954. She remained in the upper Clyde for much of her career, initially on the service for which she was named. From 1957 the three "A, B, C" sisters were working interchangeably. By 1972, linkspans at Gourock and Dunoon, and the use former Skye ferries on the Cumbrae crossing, restricted Bute and Cowal to the Wemyss Bay to Rothesay crossing.

From December 1972 Bute was chartered to MacBrayne's for two months on the Oban - Craignure - Lochaline run, while MV Clansman was rebuilt as a drive-through ferry. By the time she returned to the Clyde, the two fleets had combined under one management on 1 January 1973. Bute's funnel was the first to carry the new red CalMac colour, applied before she went north in December 1972 while that of Cowal remained the vivid CSP yellow until 1974. Bute returned to Mull in 1973.

In early 1975, Bute operated on contract, transporting workers to the oil rig construction site at Ardyne. For four summers from 1975 she maintained the Armadale crossing. Winters saw her back on the Clyde, but the arrival of the new MV Claymore made Bute (and MV Arran) redundant. MV Pioneer, MV Columba and MV Glen Sannox were all available for relief. Bute gave her last passenger sailing to the Small Isles, on 21 October 1978.
