= MV Arran =

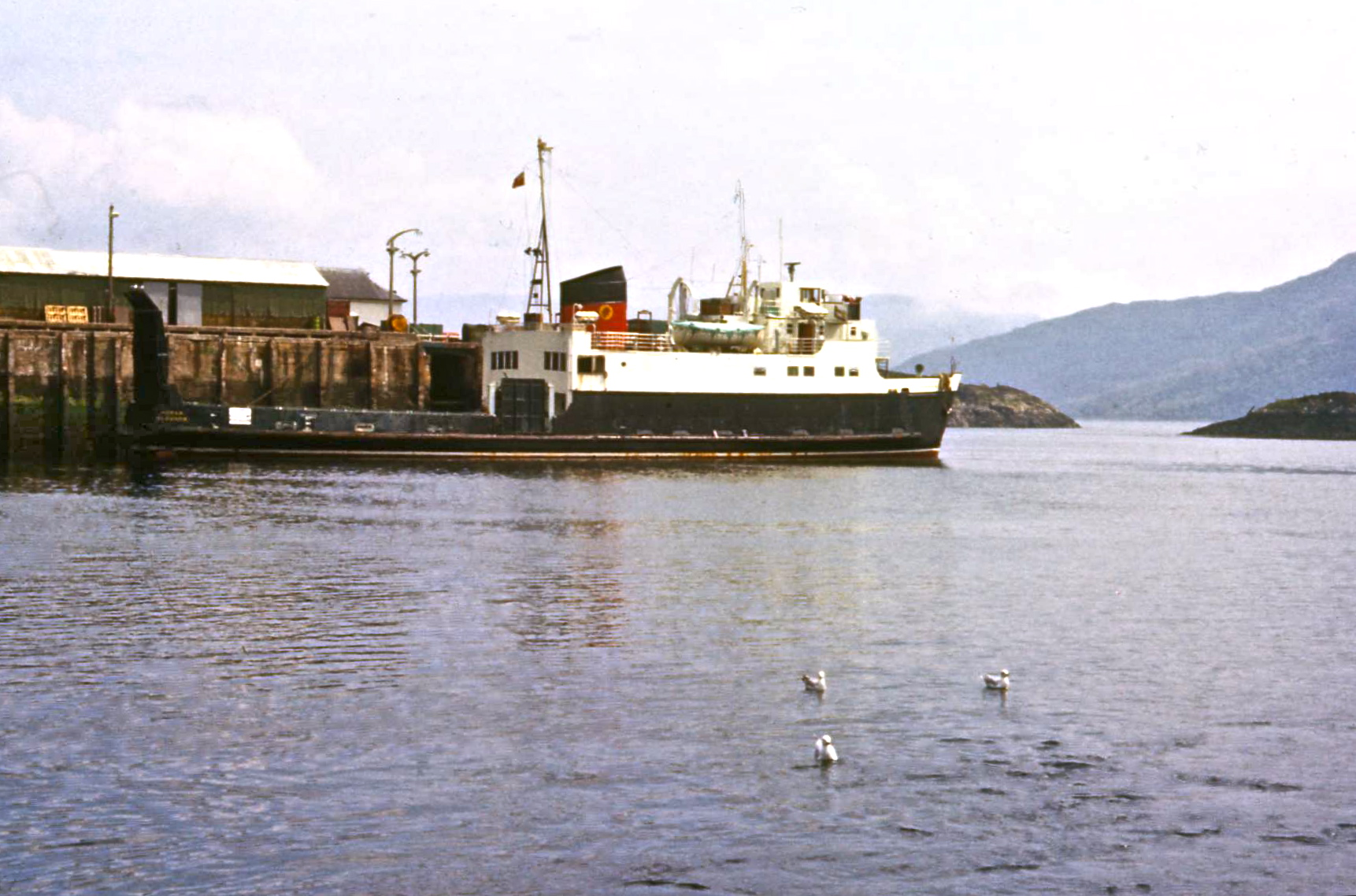
- Arran at Kyle of Lochalsh on a Mallaig sailing in 1979

History

United Kingdom
- Name: MV Arran
- Namesake: Isle of Arran
- Operator: Caledonian Steam Packet Company
- Port of registry: Glasgow, Scotland
- Route: 1953 – 1981: Clyde service
- Builder: William Denny, Dumbarton; Engine Builders: British Polar Engines
- Cost: £257,960
- Yard number: 1470
- Launched: 22 September 1953
- Sponsored by: Mrs J L Harrington
- In service: 4 January 1954
- Out of service: 19 July 1979
- Fate: Scrapped January 1993

General characteristics
- Tonnage: 540 GT
- Length: 186 ft (57 m)
- Beam: 36 ft (11 m)
- Draught: 7.5 ft (2.3 m)
- Installed power: 2 x Oil Atlas 2SCSA 6 cyl. 340 x 570mm
- Propulsion: twin screws and rudders
- Speed: 14 knots
- Capacity: 399 passengers; 30 cars

MV Arran was a pioneering Firth of Clyde vehicle ferry introduced by Caledonian Steam Packet Company in 1953. She spent fifteen years on the Upper Clyde crossings, followed by five years at Islay. Initially hoist-loading, via side ramps, these were replaced by a stern ramp in 1973. During her final years with CalMac, she relieved across the network. Several unsuccessful attempts were made to turn her into a floating restaurant, before she was scrapped in 1993.

== History ==
MV Arran was the first of a trio of vehicle vessels ordered in 1951 to modernise the Firth of Clyde fleet. Three "general purpose" vessels were planned for the Clyde routes of their names, Arran, MV Bute and MV Cowal. It rapidly became apparent that greater capacity was required in the summer and winter relief. MV Glen Sannox was launched in 1957. Built by William Denny, she was launched from their Dumbarton yard on 22 September 1953, the last Clyde vessel to be launched there. The previous Arran of 1933 was renamed Kildonan, to release the name - she was scrapped on arrival of MV Glen Sannox in 1957.

== Layout ==
MV Arran's passenger accommodation consisted of a large lounge and a tearoom above, and a bar below, the car deck. The bridge was above the upper deck, allowing passengers unobstructed views forward. Officer and crew accommodation was below the bridge and at the stern. She was initially fitted with electric hoists and side-ramps to allow the loading of vehicles from conventional piers and at any state of tide. The 14-ton cargo lift had space for five average cars, which were turned on two 14-foot turntables on the lift and a further one at the front of the "garage". An aft cargo hold had two 7-ton derricks for cargo handling. These were removed in 1958 and the hold plated over, to provide additional car deck area.

In November 1969, she underwent a £40,000-refit at Lamont's. The tearoom was upgraded to a cafeteria/restaurant with a proper galley. The observation lounge was refurbished and additional crew cabins were provided. Watertight doors were fitted forward of the hoist and the side ramps were remodelled to better fit piers on her new service at Islay. She lost her Caley lions and was repainted in MacBrayne colours, although only briefly operated by that company.

At her next major refit, costing £100,000, in April 1973 she took the new CalMac colour-scheme and a stern-loading configuration. A new stern ramp replaced the hoist and side-ramps. The aft crew accommodation was transferred below-decks, displacing the bar into the lounge.

== Service ==
MV Arran entered service on the Gourock to Dunoon crossing on 4 January 1954. For fifteen years, she remained in the upper Clyde: Gourock to Dunoon; Wemyss Bay to Rothesay and Wemyss Bay (or Largs) to Millport. She relieved as the Arran car ferry.

From January 1970, Arran was based at West Loch Tarbert and gave two weekday return sailings daily, one each to Port Ellen and Port Askaig. She also called at Craighouse (Jura) (until October 1970), Gigha and Colonsay. Once in stern-loading layout, she assumed three double crossings a day between modified at terminals at Port Ellen and West Loch Tarbert. Port Askaig was abandoned to Western Ferries. In West Loch Tarbert, she was able to stern load off a mild concrete slope with no linkspan, as tides are so slight.

MV Pioneer took over the Islay service on 14 August 1974, and Arran became a spare vessel, relieving regularly on both the Clyde and the Western Isles. A starboard side-ramp was re-fitted at the 1975 overhaul, so she could relieve at Dunoon. She was in service throughout the winters, relieving at Oban, Mallaig and Islay. She spent her final summers on standby at Gourock, frequently carrying gas tankers to Rothesay. The arrival of the new MV Claymore effectively made Arran (and MV Bute) redundant. MV Pioneer, MV Columba and MV Glen Sannox were all available for relief. Arran made her last CalMac sailing, from Tiree to Tobermory on 19 July 1979, and was laid up in the East India Harbour, Greenock.

== Dispoal ==
She was sold to Orisot Ltd on 2 September 1981 as a floating restaurant-nightclub. She was berthed in Dublin, and underwent a refit costing £750,000. Superstructure, including a helicopter pad, was built up aft, over the former car deck. In 1983, the enterprise was abandoned. In December 1986 she was sold to Manxman Leisure (who then ran a floating restaurant-nightclub at Preston, Lancashire in the former ferry Manxman) and towed to Salford Quays, Manchester. A similar nightclub venture in Albert Dock, Hull, to be named The Revolution, was proposed. The project failed to materialise and she was broken up in Manchester in January 1993.

== See also ==
- List of ships built by William Denny and Brothers
