= MV Claymore (1978) =

Scottish ferry and supply vessel

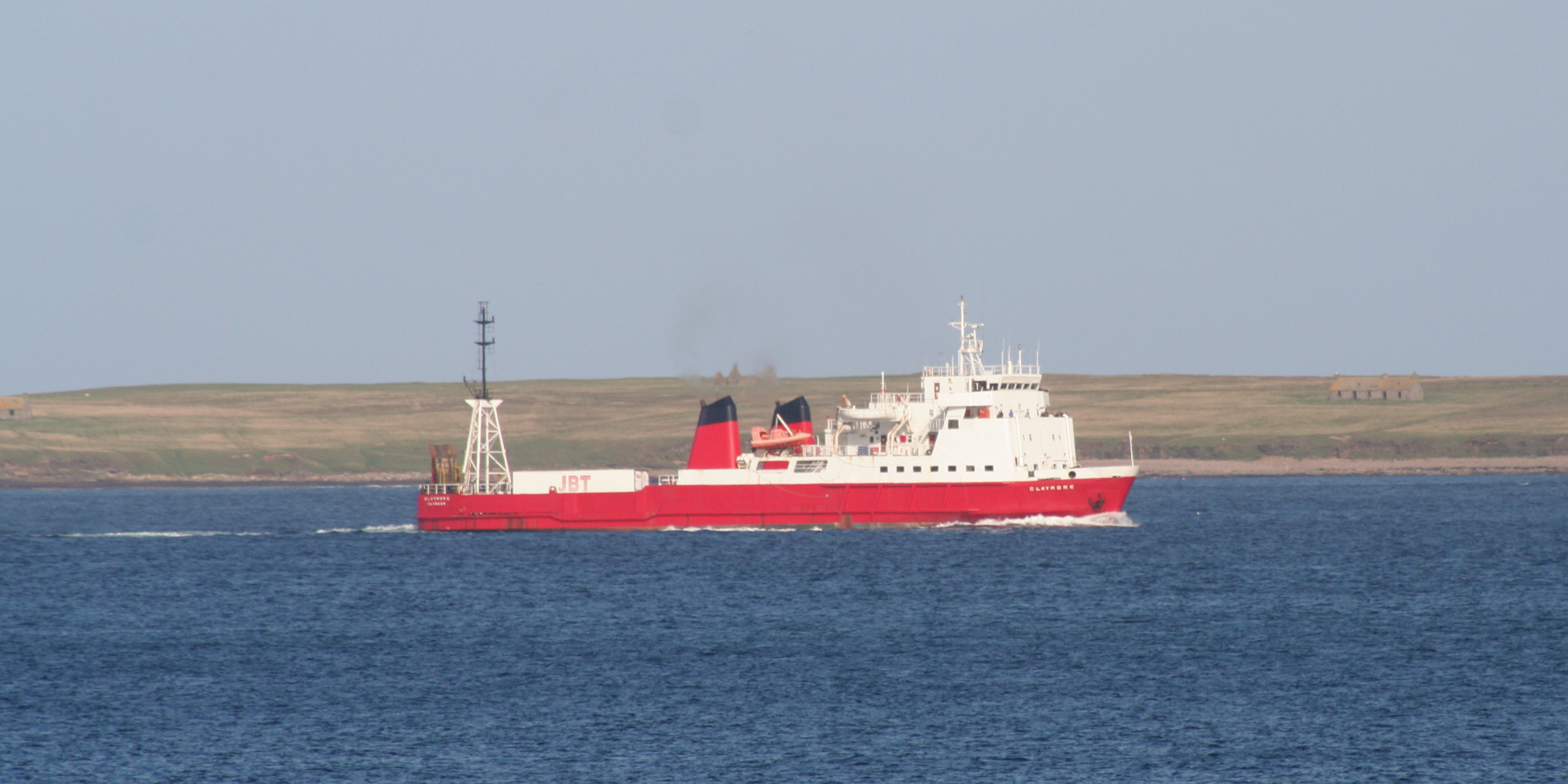
- As MV Claymore in Pentland Ferries service (2008)

History

Panama
- Name: MV Ocean Link
- Owner: CT Offshore
- Acquired: March 2009
- In service: 2010
- Home port: Svendborg
- Identification: IMO number: 7715434; MMSI number: 219013938; Callsign: OWFI2
- Status: awaiting service

United Kingdom
- Name: MV Claymore
- Owner: December 1978 – May 1997: Caledonian MacBrayne; May 1997 – 1999: Argyll & Antrim Steam Packet Co; 1999 – 2002: Sea Containers; October 2002 – March 2009: Pentland Ferries
- Operator: 13 May 2000 – 23 June 2000: Strandfaraskip Landsins, Tórshavn, Faroe Islands (on charter)
- Port of registry: Glasgow
- Route: March 1979 – 1989 Oban – Barra / Lochboisdale; 1989 – 1993: Kennacraig – Islay; 1997 – 2000: Campbeltown – Ballycastle; October 2002 – March 2009: Gills Bay – St. Margaret's Hope
- Builder: Robb Caledon, Leith
- Yard number: 522
- Launched: 31 August 1978
- Sponsored by: Lady Kirkhill
- In service: 1 March 1979
- Identification: IMO number: 7715434; MMSI number: 235009221; Callsign: GYAE

General characteristics
- Type: Steel Double Screw Motor Vessel
- Tonnage: 1,631 GT
- Length: 230 ft (70.1 m)
- Beam: 51 ft (15.5 m)
- Draft: 16 ft (4.9 m)
- Propulsion: Mirrlees Blackstone Diesels
- Speed: 15 kn (28 km/h)
- Capacity: 500 passengers, 50 cars

MV Claymore was a car and passenger ferry built in 1978 for Caledonian MacBrayne. For ten years, she operated between Oban and the Outer Isles. Between October 2002 and March 2009, she was the Pentland Ferries relief vessel on the Short Sea Crossing to Orkney. Since March 2009, she has operated, as MV Sia, a RORO cable-laying and supply vessel. During 2022, the vessel was renamed to MV Ocean Link.

== History ==
MV Claymore was built by Robb Caledon, Leith for Caledonian MacBrayne and launched on 31 August 1978. The third ferry to bear the name Claymore, she entered service between Oban and the Outer Isles.

She was out of service for the three months in 1982 after running into rocks at the entrance to Lochboisdale harbour. A collision in 1986 resulted in significant bow damage. She performed the annual Govan Shipbuilders charter with a flat plate welded across the damaged area. It was painted black with a large yellow CalMac lion to make it look less odd.

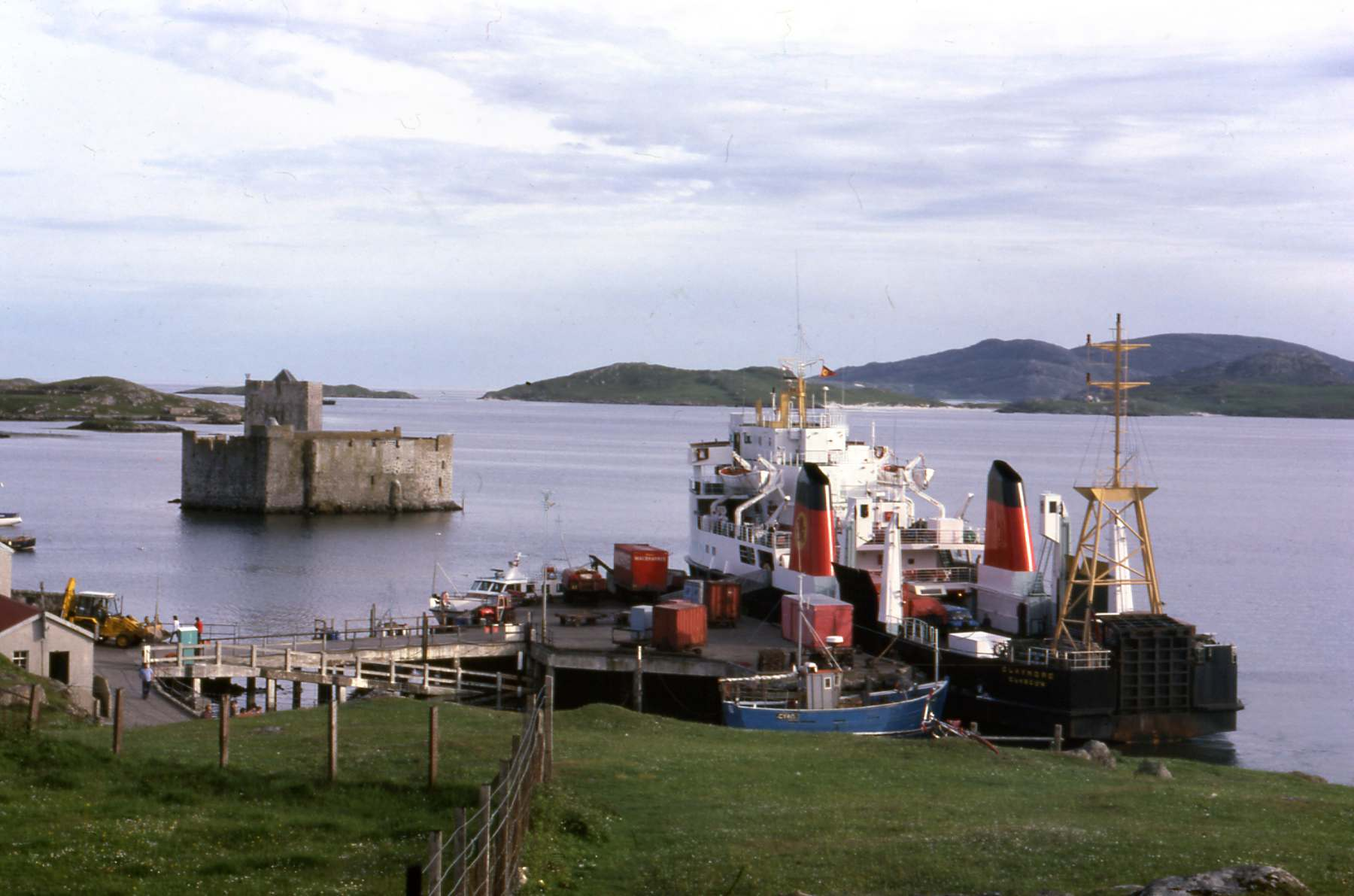
Claymore at Castlebay, Barra (1985)

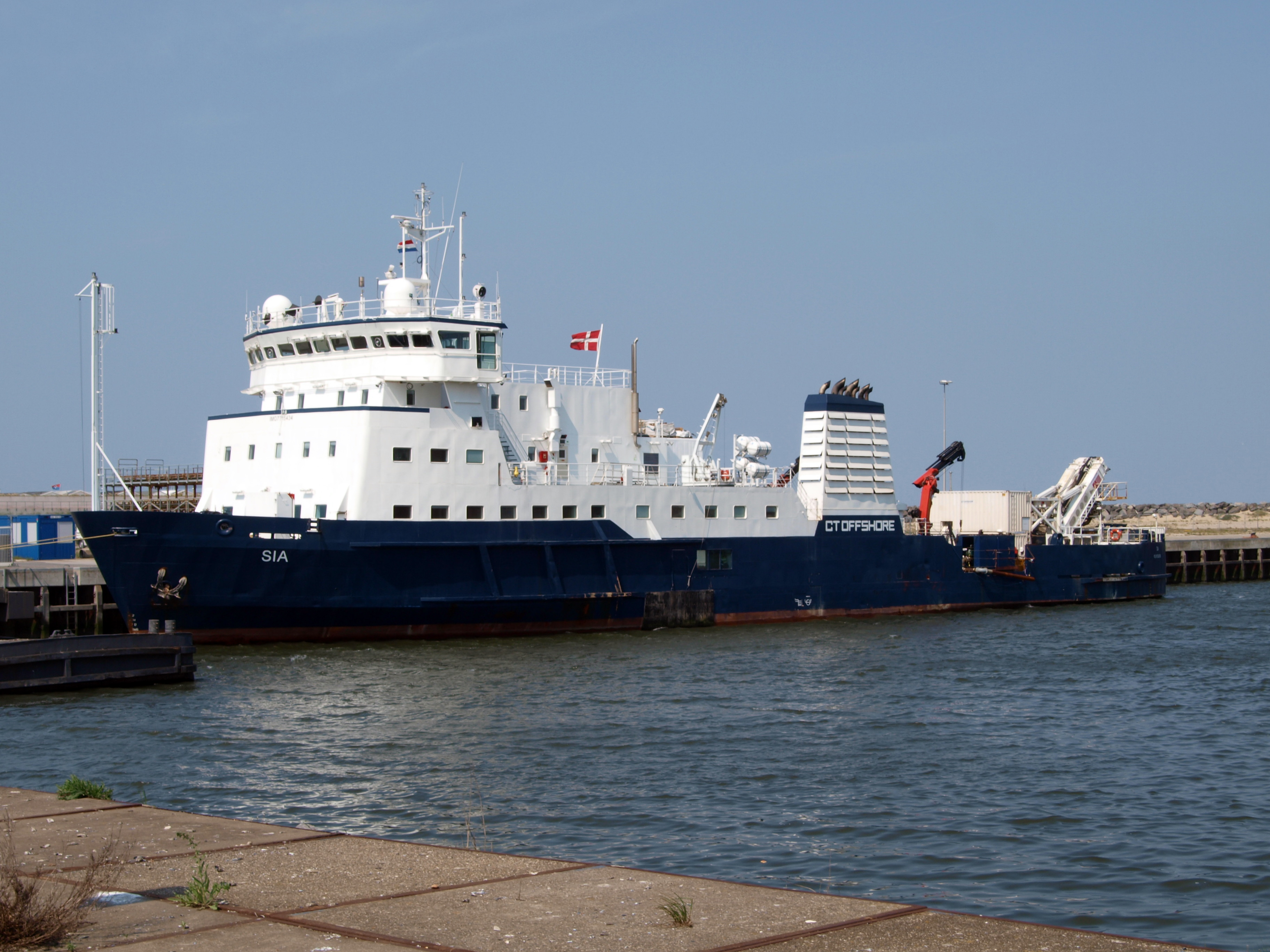
Sia at Port of Amsterdam (2011)

The cafeteria was refurbished in 1997 when sold to Sea Containers.

On 11 March 2003, in gale-force winds, Claymore was blown away from her intended berth in St Margaret's Hope Bay. Her starboard propeller became entangled in the moorings of smaller vessels and the 12 passengers were disembarked safely by the Longhope Lifeboat. The subsequent investigation by the Marine Accident Investigation Branch (MAIB) made several recommendations to improve safety.

In March 2009 Claymore was sold to CT Offshore ApS, a Danish shipping company and moved to Svendborg. She was renamed Sia on 29 April 2009. The new owners added 4x 600 kW auxiliary engines to supply 4 forward thrusters and 3 aft thrusters, giving dynamic positioning capability for her new cable-laying role.

She now appears to have a new name "Ocean Link", and is currently operating around Albania.

== Layout ==
Claymore is a larger half-sister to MV Pioneer, built by the same shipyard. She has four decks of accommodation including saloons, bars and cabins for 32 passengers. The ticket office is forward of the car deck. The cafeteria is above the lounge bar, reached by two sets of stairs outside the bar. The toilets are next to these stairs.

She had room for 50 cars, loaded via a stern ramp and a 36-ton hoist. The hoist was removed in December 2007.

== Service ==
Claymore entered service on the Outer Isles route from Oban. She remained on this route for ten years, sailing to Barra and Lochboisdale. She made calls at Tobermory, Lochaline on the Morvern coastline, and Coll and Tiree on alternate days. Claymore was transferred to the Kennacraig - Islay service in 1989, and in 1993 became CalMac's spare summer vessel. During the summer of 1993 she was on the Clyde, seeing service at Rothesay, Dunoon and Brodick. In 1994 and 1995 Claymore provided weekend voyages to Douglas, Isle of Man. For this service she was given an International Passenger Certificate for 300. She was the first vessel to use hoist loading on the Isle of Man. In September 1995 Claymore became the first CalMac vessel to visit Wales, under charter to the Hamilton Oil Company. She became probably the most travelled member of the CalMac fleet, visiting twenty-four terminals in total in 1996, her last full year with the company.

In May 1997 Claymore was sold to Argyll and Antrim Steam Packet Company, a subsidiary of Sea Containers (Scotland) Ltd. For three years Claymore operated a new summer sailing from Campbeltown to Ballycastle, Northern Ireland, providing winter overhaul relief for CalMac under charter. On termination of the Ballycastle service, she was moved to Birkenhead and put on the market. She carried out a five-week charter to the Faroe Islands in June 2000.

Andrew Banks of Pentland Ferries bought Claymore for the service between St Margaret's Hope, Orkney and Gills Bay, Caithness in October 2002, where she joined the former CalMac vessel, Iona, since renamed MV Pentalina-B. On occasions her passengers numbers were limited to twelve.

During the summer of 2006 she was employed on short-term charter as a livestock carrier between Dover and Calais.

CT Offshore list her as a RORO Supply Vessel with dynamic positioning.
