= Pentland Ferries =

Private ferry company in Scotland

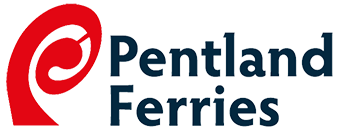
- Type: Private
- Industry: Transport
- Founded: 1997
- Headquarters: St Margaret’s Hope, Scotland
- Area served: Pentland Firth
- Key people: Andrew Banks
- Website: pentlandferries.co.uk

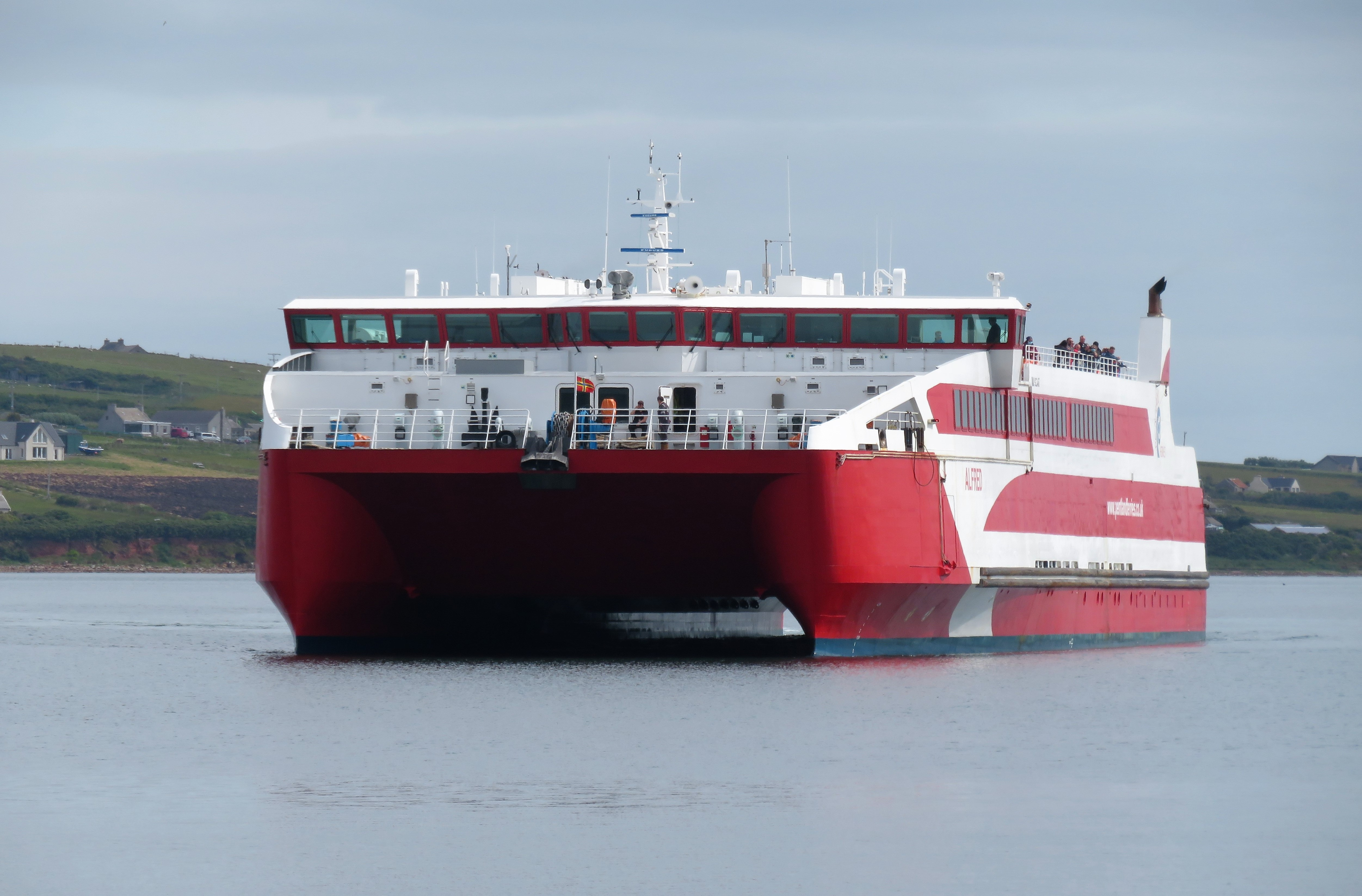
MV Alfred

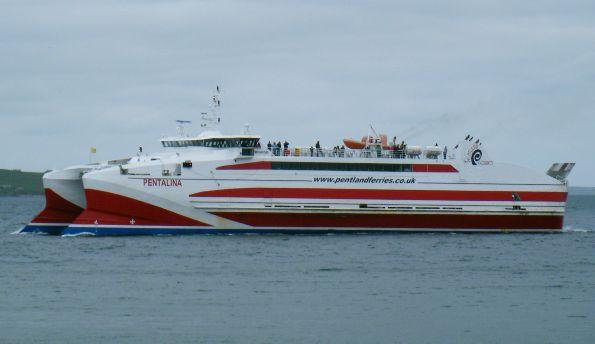
MV Pentalina

Pentland Ferries is a privately owned, family company which has operated a ferry service between Gills Bay in Caithness, Scotland and St Margaret's Hope on South Ronaldsay in Orkney since May 2001. The company is one of only two major vehicle ferry operators within Scotland not owned by, or contracted to run a public service for, the Scottish Government or local authorities.

== History ==
Pentland Ferries was founded by its present managing director, Andrew Banks, in 1997. In October that year he purchased the Caledonian MacBrayne passenger and vehicle ferry Iona. Banks obtained a 99-year lease on the Gills Bay terminal, about 3 miles (5 kilometres) west of John o' Groats. After two years work improving the site, and further work at St Margaret's Hope, he started operating the short sea crossing with Pentalina B in May 2001. The service operates year-round with the custom built passenger and vehicle catamaran Pentalina.

An earlier attempt to operate the short sea crossing between Caithness and Orkney had been abandoned in 1989, mainly because of the exposed conditions at Gills Bay.

Andrew Banks was recognised in the 2014 New Year Honours and in March 2014 was appointed an OBE by Queen Elizabeth II for "services to transport and the community in Orkney".

== Fleet ==
The current Pentland Ferries fleet consists of:

- MV Alfred, since 2019
- MV Pentalina, since 2008

Former fleet consists of:

- MV Orcadia, 2015–2021
- MV Pentalina-B, 1997–2009
- MV Claymore, 2002–2009

The current catamaran ferry, MV Pentalina, was built in the Philippines for the Pentland Firth, where it entered service in March 2009. The ferry has a capacity of 350 passengers and either 32 cars and 8 articulated lorries or an increased number of cars, with a service speed of 18 knots (33 km/h).

The original ferry, former Caledonian MacBrayne vessel MV Iona, was purchased in October 1997 and renamed Pentalina-B. The first drive-through MacBrayne ferry with both bow and stern doors, she carried around 50 cars, or 4–5 articulated lorries and fewer cars. During the off-seasons since 2006, she was chartered out, carrying livestock across the channel from Dover and providing freight relief for CalMac. She was sold to an owner in Cape Verde in late 2009.

Another former CalMac vessel, Claymore, was owned between October 2002 and March 2009. After another attempt at starting up the Orkney to Invergordon route fell through, the vessel was put to work during the winter season in place of Pentalina-B. Claymore was sold in March 2009.

The fleet also includes a barge, used for dredging at Gills in the summer and an extension to the pier at St Margaret's Hope in the winter, a former fishing boat, to tow the barge and a tug / workboat for general duties. In addition to the usual tractor units and tugs for moving trailers and other cargo equipment there are a number of pieces of construction and earth-moving equipment not usually required by a ferry company.

In February 2015, the company bought a further CalMac vessel, MV Saturn, to be used as a freight vessel.

In April 2017, an order for a new 85m catamaran ferry was placed with Strategic Marine with funding secured from Bank of Scotland. The vessel was built by Strategic Marine Vietnam (Vũng Tàu). Initially due to enter service in summer 2018, the vessel, named MV Alfred, arrived in St Margaret's Hope on 9 October 2019, and entered service on 1 November 2019. The vessel was designed by BMT Specialised Ship Design (formally BMT Nigel Gee) and is claimed to be one of the cleanest and greenest ferry of its kind, with over 60% less fuel consumption and CO_{2} emissions than similar ferries serving the Scottish islands.

== Route ==
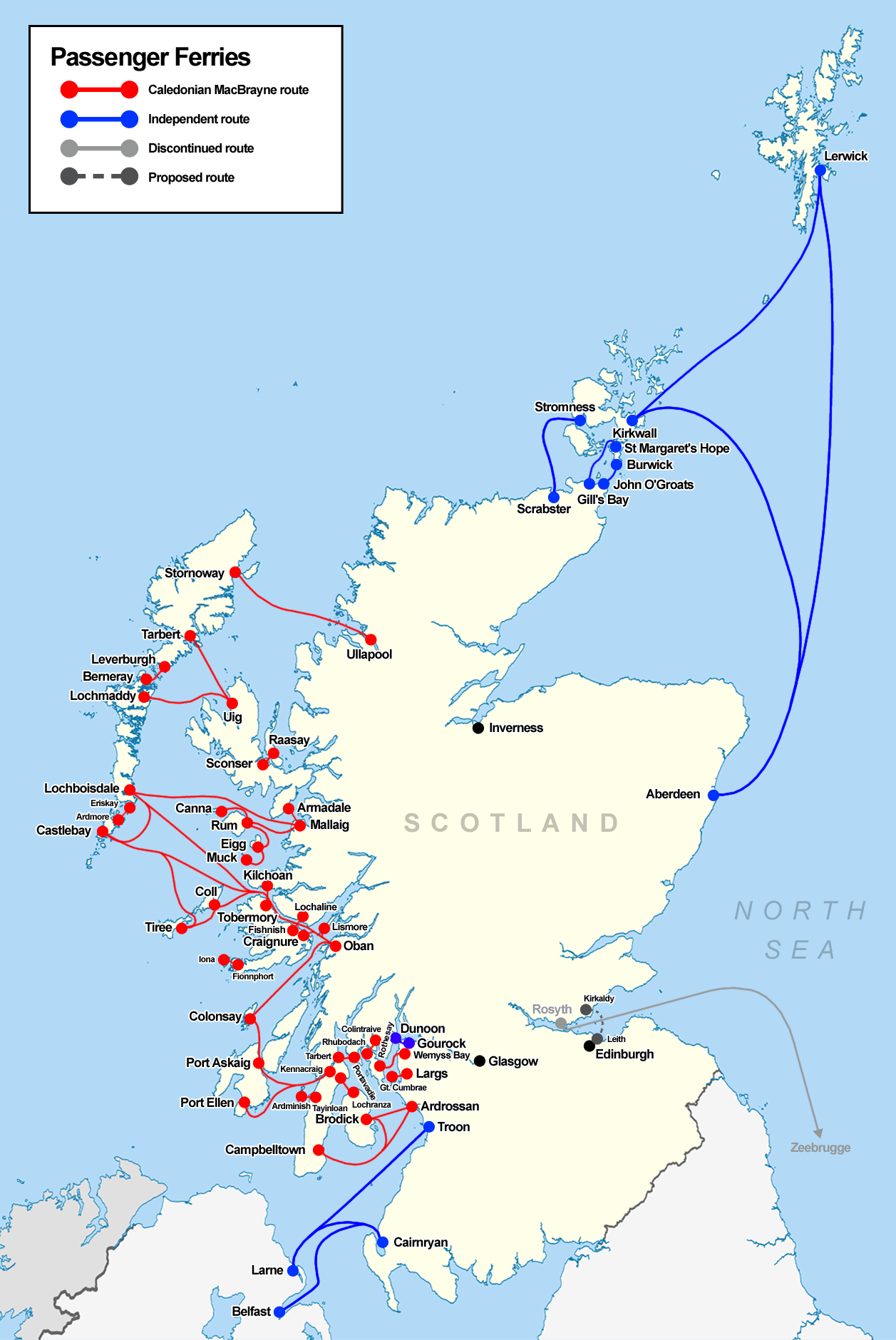
Map of ferry services in Scotland

The Short Sea Crossing is the quickest route across the Pentland Firth by car, taking under an hour. Due to the short sailing time the vessels have a cafeteria for meals and refreshments, but no cabin accommodation.
