= Gills Bay =

Bay in Scotland

Coordinates: 58°39′N 3°09′W

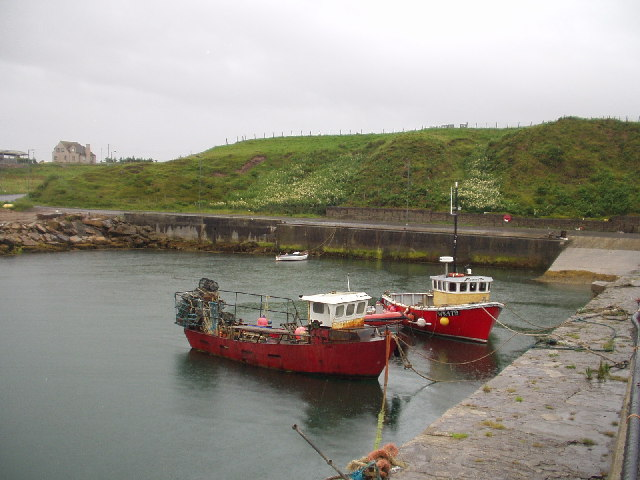
Gills Bay

Gills Bay, which is situated about 3 mi (4.8 km) west of John o' Groats with the community of Gills close by, has one of the longest stretches of low-lying rock coast on the northern shores of Caithness. Its main features are a small harbour and the pier used as the mainland terminal for Pentland Ferries. The harbour shelters some small local boats together with those used for working the sheep on the off lying island of Stroma. In the right sea conditions the area is sometimes used for surfing.

== Short sea crossing ==
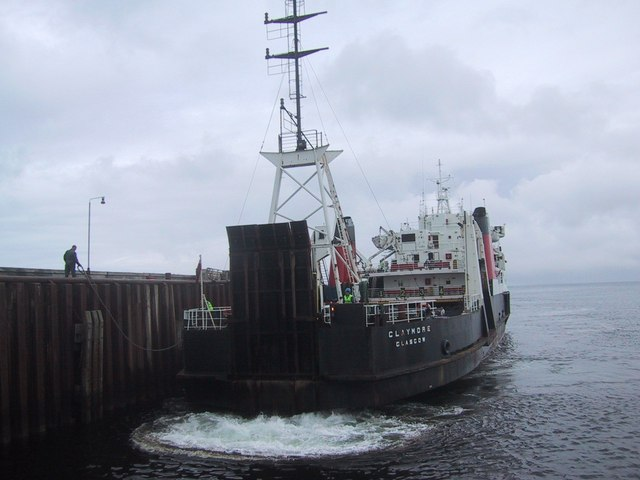
A ferry at Gills Bay pier

While Scrabster to Stromness is the longest continuously used ferry route to Orkney, started in 1856, historically the Gills Bay area has been the main setting off point from the mainland to the islands of Stroma and Swona and Orkney itself. This route, known as The Short Sea Crossing, is generally considered to be both the quickest and safest across the waters of the Pentland Firth. At present Pentland Ferries operate a year-round service on this route to St Margaret's Hope on South Ronaldsay.

== History ==
The first pier was constructed in 1905 with the harbour some time later. In the 1980s Orkney Island Council decided to re-introduce the short sea crossing from Gills Bay to Burwick on South Ronaldsay. Tens of millions of pounds were spent on a new ferry and building a terminal and linkspan at Gills Bay together with similar facilities at Burwick. The service started on 15 August 1989, sailing to Houton near Orphir as dredging still had to be done at Burwick, and ended on 16 September 1989 when the linkspan at Gills was damaged by heavy weather.

It was then realised that it would be impossible to run a regular service as planned due to the weather conditions and the operation was closed down, the ferry being laid-up for a while before being utilised by Orkney Ferries for inter-island work. Recently Burwick has been used by the passenger-only ferry which operates from John o' Groats during the summer.

In the late 1990s Andrew Banks, an Orkney entrepreneur and founder of Pentland Ferries saw the potential of re-introducing the short sea crossing and attempted to make use of the terminal. It was only after he had threatened to build his own a short distance away that the council relented and he obtained a 99-year lease on the site. With a handful of local workers and some second hand construction machinery he spent two years, living in a caravan on site, making the terminal better able to withstand the swell and weather conditions experienced. This involved the construction of a pier, incorporating the dolphins (freestanding structures a vessel lies against) constructed by the previous operators, together with some dredging work.

By the summer of 2001 Pentland Ferries were ready to start regular sailings with their vessel, the MV Pentalina-B to St Margaret's Hope. It was soon realised that even with these improvements, there would still be problems and that a much longer pier would be needed. Fortunately an old floating dock was available for disposal at Lerwick. This was purchased, towed to St Margaret's Hope, where it was cleaned of all contaminants and then towed to Gills Bay where it was sunk to form a continuation of the pier thus greatly increasing its length. Old oil transfer hoses from the Scapa Flow oil terminal were used as fenders for the ferry while rock armour was dumped on the seaward side for protection against the waves. The tanks have been filled with concrete and the dock itself filled with the spoil from dredging to make more room for the ferry to maneuver. By the time all this work was completed the dock was incorporated into the pier.

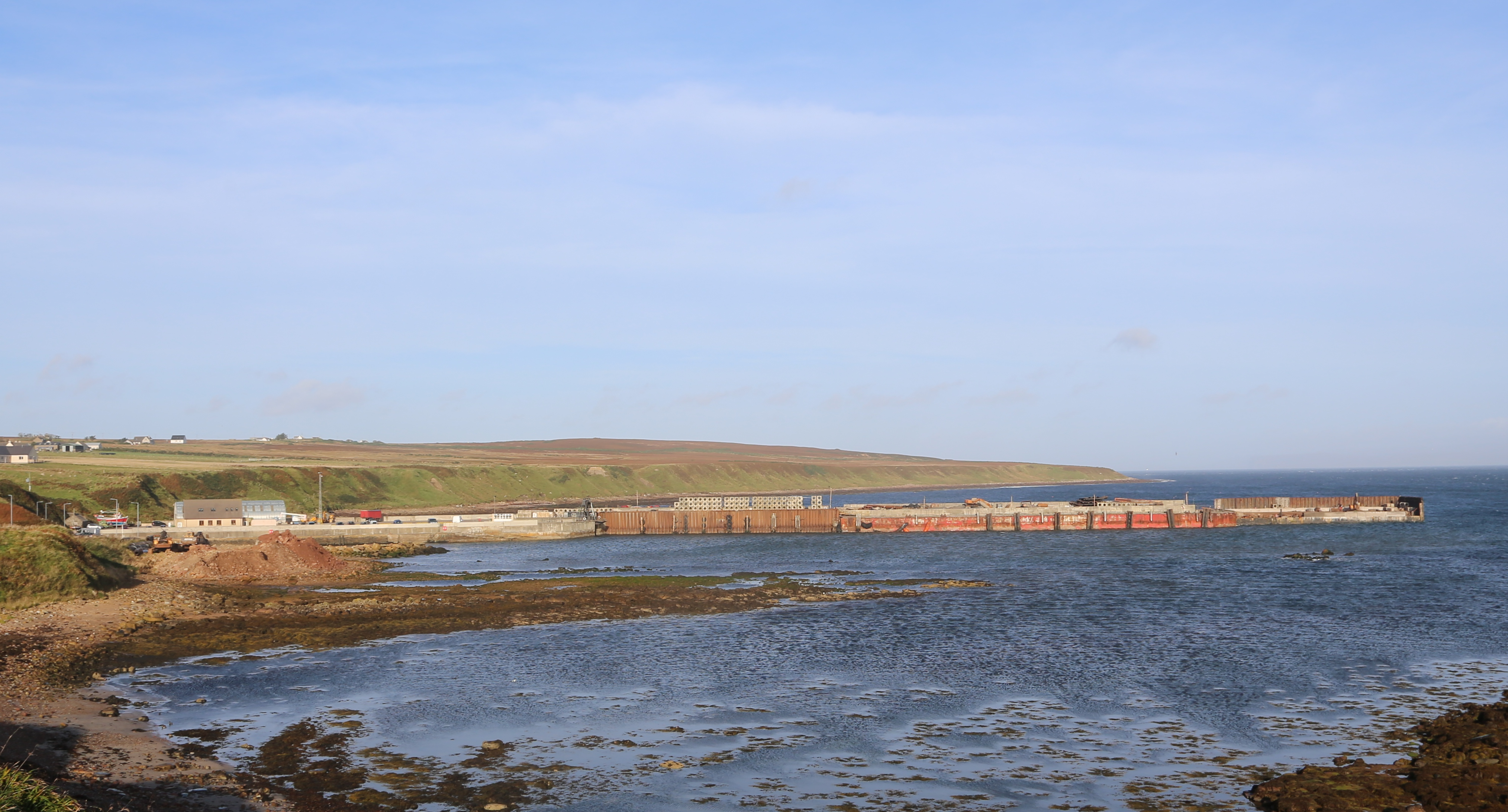
The pier in 2016

== Wildlife ==
Seals can be seen at all times of the year, on the rocks and swimming in all parts of the firth. They usually bask on the rocks on the ebb (falling) tide since it saves them having to move as the water rises. Some are often seen close to the far (West) side of the pier. A larger group are usually on protruding rocks a few hundred yards away on the harbour side. The grey seal is the more common, this area having one of the largest British populations, however the common seal is also present.

Wild dogs are often spotted around the Gills area which are believed to have come across on the ferry from Orkney.

Porpoises can be seen all year round in all parts of the firth and at Gills Bay as they tend to favour shallower water. Usually seen singly or in small numbers although in the autumn many large groups may be seen in Gills Bay where they congregate.

Basking sharks are rare but are being seen more often around May to August. Usually seen feeding inshore at high tide around here in the Gills Bay / Stroma area though may be seen in deeper water.
