= Mey, Highland =

Coordinates: 58.63751°N 3.22535°W

Mey
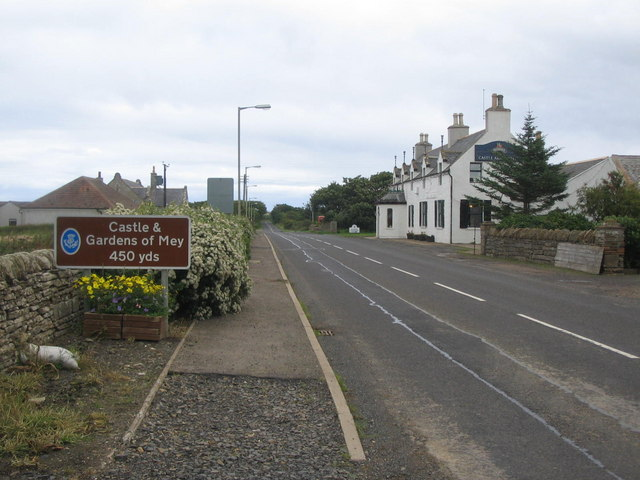
- A view looking to the northeast along the A836 at Mey

- Location within the Caithness area
- OS grid reference: ND289728
- Council area: Highland
- Lieutenancy area: Caithness
- Country: Scotland
- Sovereign state: United Kingdom
- Post town: THURSO
- Postcode district: KW14
- Dialling code: 01847
- Police: Scotland
- Fire: Scottish
- Ambulance: Scottish
- UK Parliament: Caithness, Sutherland and Easter Ross
- Scottish Parliament: Caithness, Sutherland and Ross

Mey is a remote village, located on the north coast of Scotland in Caithness, Scottish Highlands and is in the Scottish council area of Highland.

Mey lies 6 miles (10 kilometres) west of John o' Groats and 1/2 mi (800 m) southeast of the Loch of Mey. The Castle of Mey lies 1 mi (1.6 km) northeast overlooking Mey Bay. There is also a hotel run in the former coaching inn.

== Fishing ==
The Annual Reports of the Fishery Board for Scotland provide an insight into the state of fishing from Gills and Mey in the years before the First World War.

Fishery Statistics

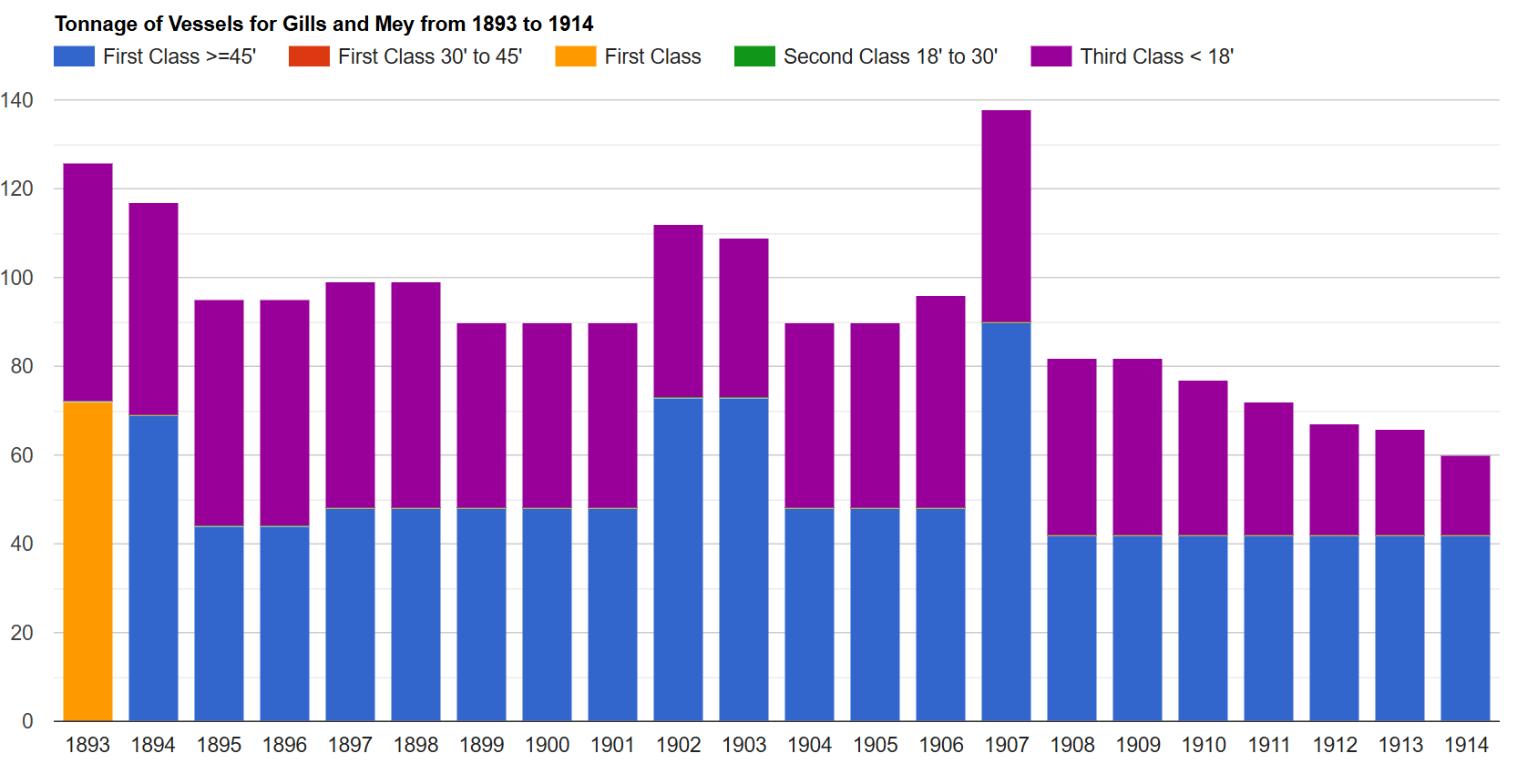
Tonnage of vessels

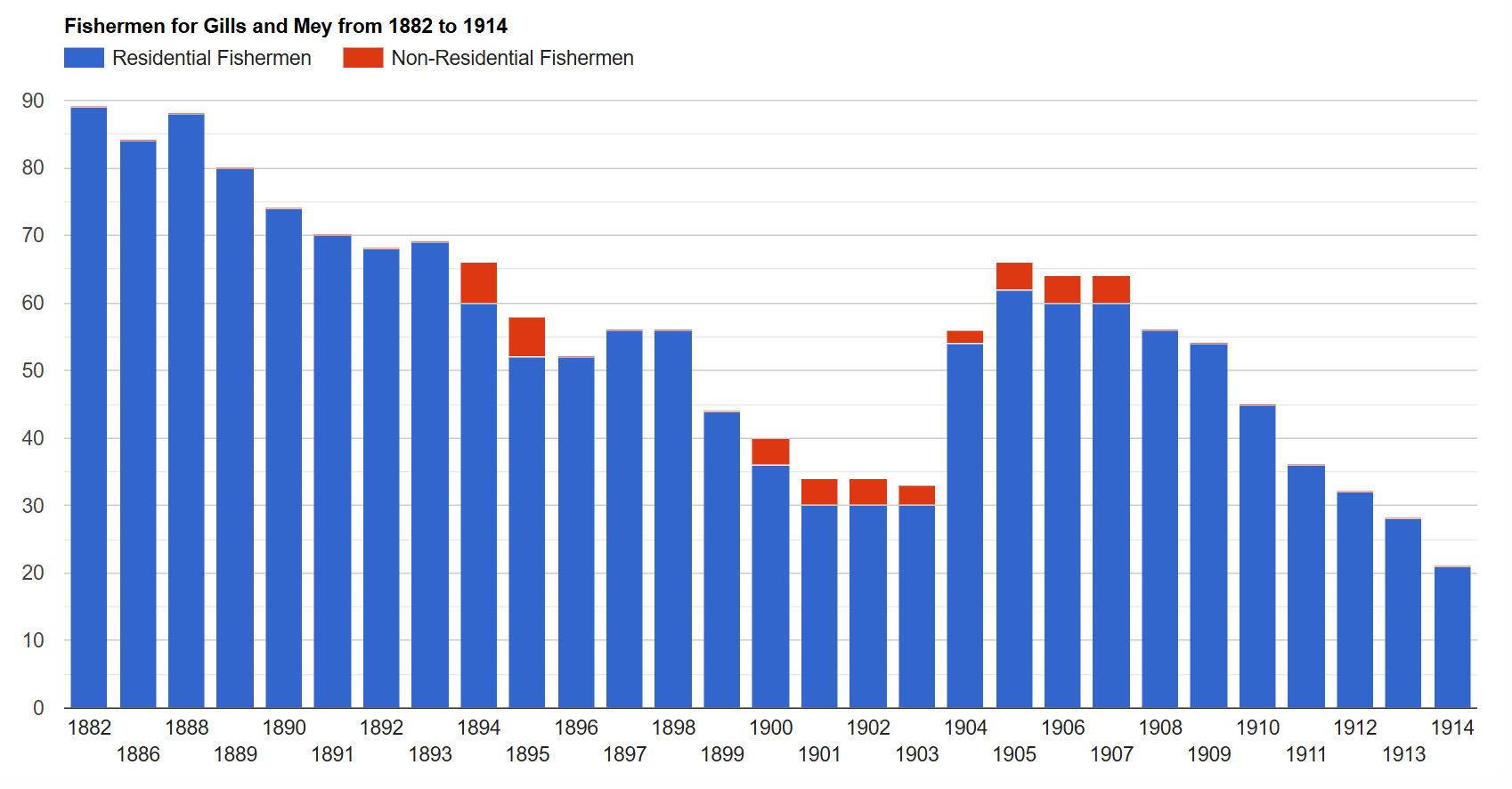
Fishermen

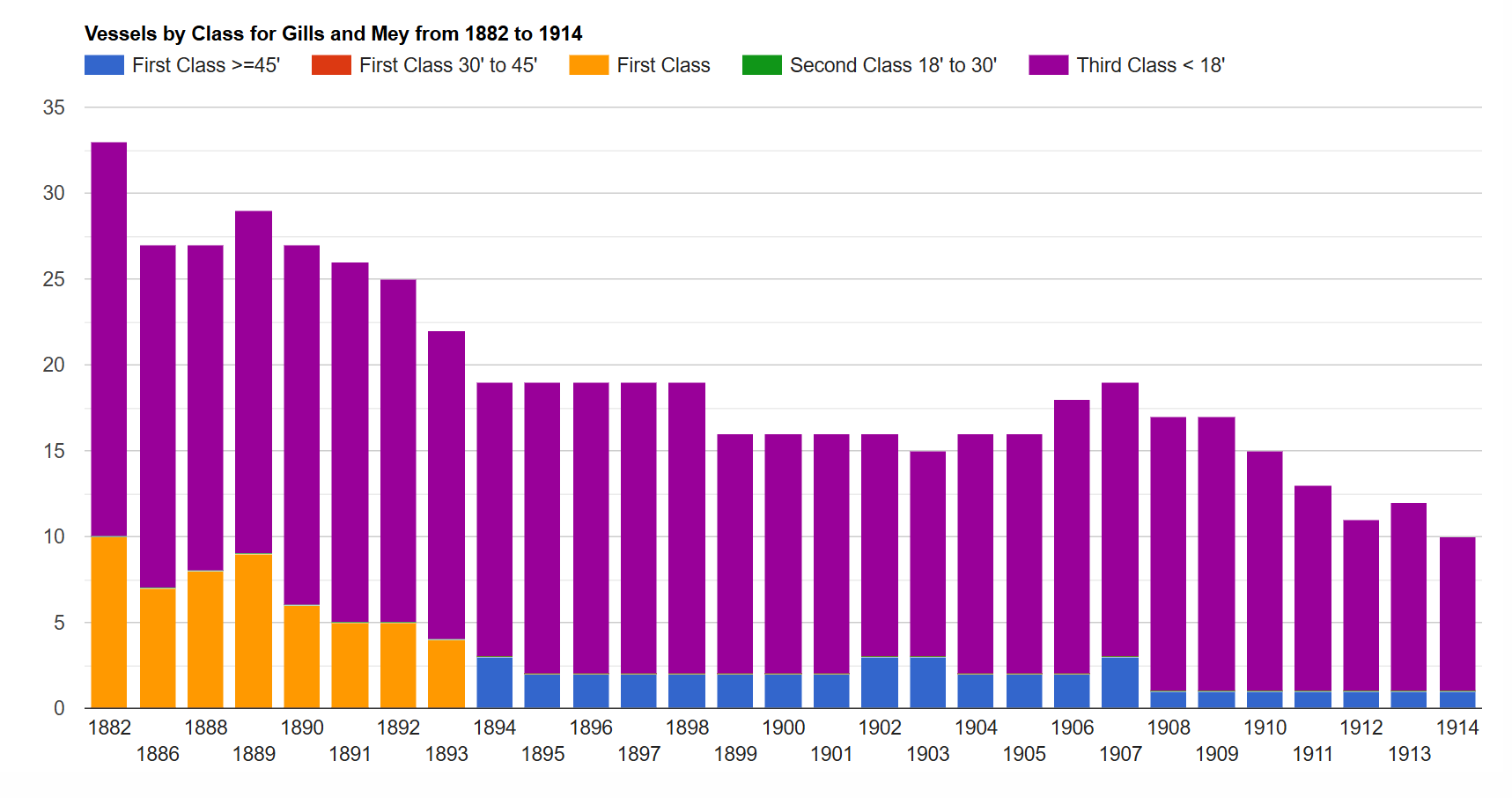
Vessels by class

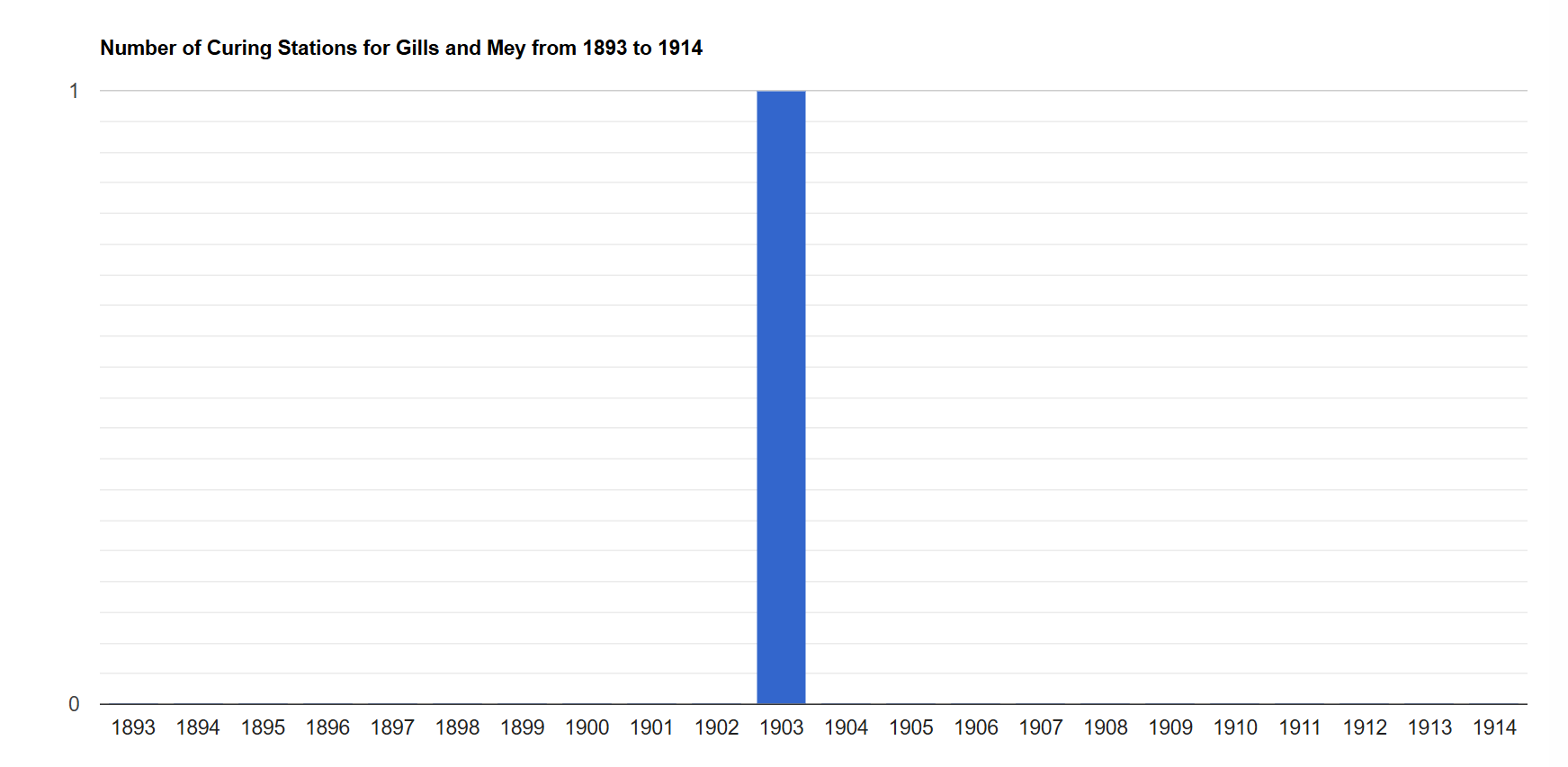
Number of curing stations
