= St Margaret's Hope =

Coordinates: 58.826°N 2.961°W

St Margaret's Hope: Scots: Saunt Marget's
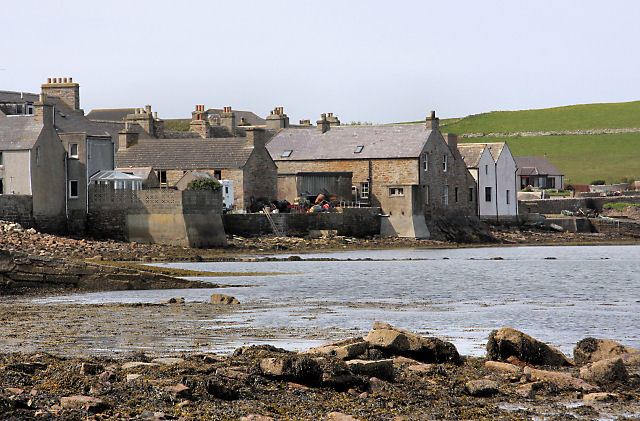
- Buildings on the shore at St Margaret's Hope

- Location within Orkney
- Area: 0.42 km^{2} (0.16 sq mi)
- Population: 550 (approx.)
  - Density: 1,310/km^{2} (3,400/sq mi)
- OS grid reference: ND445935
- Council area: Orkney Islands
- Lieutenancy area: Orkney Islands
- Country: Scotland
- Sovereign state: United Kingdom
- Post town: ORKNEY
- Postcode district: KW17
- Dialling code: 01856
- Police: Scotland
- Fire: Scottish
- Ambulance: Scottish
- UK Parliament: Orkney and Shetland
- Scottish Parliament: Orkney

St Margaret's Hope is a village in the Orkney Islands, off the north coast of Scotland. It is known locally as The Hope or The Hup. With a population of about 550, it is Orkney's third largest settlement after Kirkwall and Stromness.

St Margaret's Hope is the main settlement of the island of South Ronaldsay. Situated off Water Sound at the head of a calm bay on the island's northern coast, it is connected to the Orkney Mainland by the A961 road running across the Churchill Barriers.

St Margaret's Hope is believed to have been named after either Saint Margaret of Scotland (c.1045-1093), the wife of Malcolm III, or Margaret, Maid of Norway, who died in Orkney and possibly in this location in 1290.

The village has a primary school, a small blacksmith's museum, a few shops and a cafe, a pub and a wine bar. Pentland Ferries run a service from the pier in the bay to Gills Bay on the Scottish mainland.

It is also known for its annual Boys' Ploughing Match, a local tradition where young boys plough the sands at the nearby Sands of Wright, and girls (or boys, though this is now a rarity) wear traditional 'horse' costumes resembling a harness. The event, which incorporates The Festival of the Horse, is known to have been in existence for at least 200 years, and takes place on the third Saturday of August.

Scant traces of an Iron Age broch can be found in a field off the Ontaft road above the village. The site could once be identified by Victorian OS maps, but with the passage of time and all but a 'crop mark' remaining, modern maps fail to show its location.
