= MV Clyde Clipper =

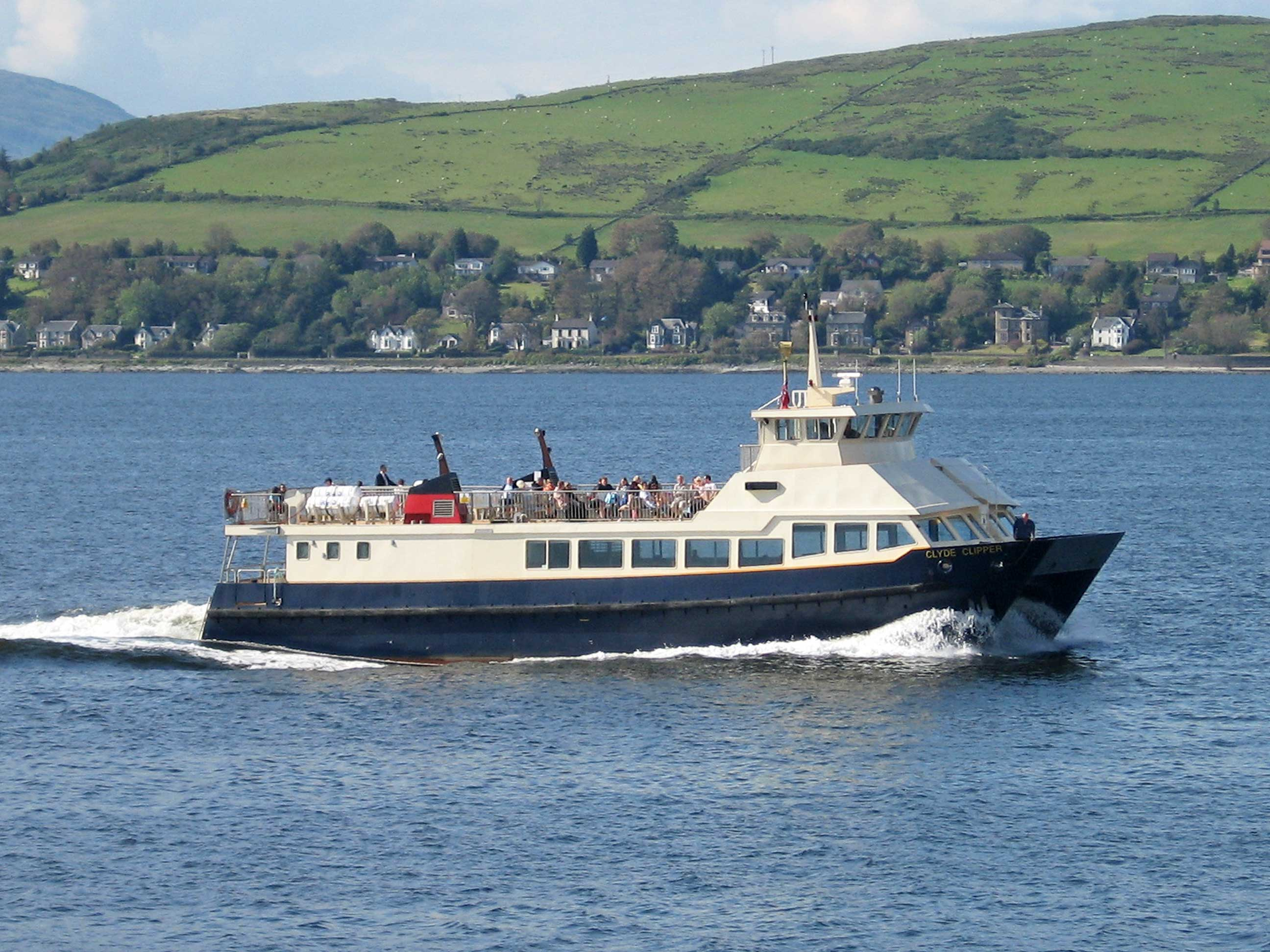
- Clyde Clipper arriving at Gourock, on the Argyll Ferries service from Dunoon

History

United Kingdom
- Name: Clyde Clipper
- Builder: Abels Shipbuilders
- Yard number: 128
- Completed: 2010
- Identification: MMSI number: 235068375; Callsign: 2BQF3

General characteristics
- Type: Passenger ferryboat
- Tonnage: 125 GT
- Length: 27.2 m (89 ft 3 in)
- Beam: 11.2 m (36 ft 9 in)
- Draught: 2.2 m (7 ft 3 in)
- Depth: 3.9 m (12 ft 10 in)
- Propulsion: 2 × 540 bhp (403 kW) Doosan engines; 2 × fixed pitch propellers
- Speed: 12.7 knots (23.5 km/h; 14.6 mph)
- Capacity: 250 passengers

MV Clyde Clipper is a cruise boat, a purpose built catamaran with a capacity of around 250 passengers and facilities for weddings, functions and corporate hospitality, including bar and catering facilities. She was built by Abels Shipbuilders of Bristol in 2010.

From 30 June 2011 it was leased by Argyll Ferries Ltd as an interim ferry on the Gourock-Dunoon service, covering the service along with the MV Ali Cat until the 244 passenger ferry MV Argyll Flyer was converted from the ten-year-old Banrion Chonamara of the Irish Aran Island Service.
