= MV Orcadia =

Passenger and vehicle ferry

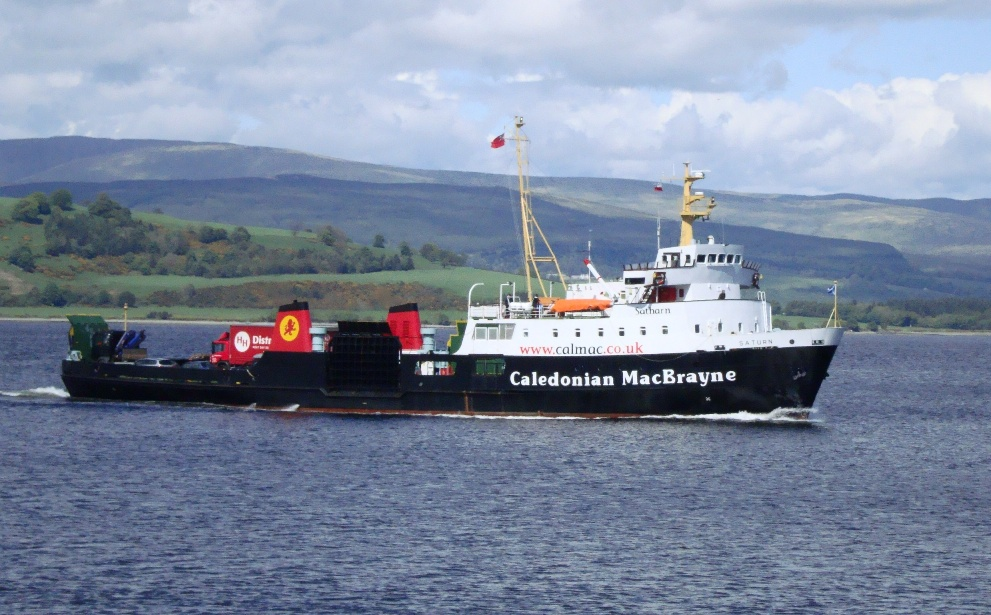
- MV Saturn arriving at Gourock in May 2009

History

United Kingdom
- Name: 1978–2015: Saturn; 2015-2021: Orcadia; 2021-2023: Orion; 2024 – present: Orion K
- Namesake: Saturn; Orcadia; Orion
- Operator: 1978–2011: Caledonian MacBrayne; 2015–2021: Pentland Ferries; 2021–2023: Creta Cargo Lines
- Port of registry: Glasgow
- Route: Firth of Clyde; 1977–1986: Wemyss Bay–Rothesay; 1986–2005: Wemyss Bay–Rothesay/Gourock–Dunoon; 2005–2011: Wemyss Bay–Rothesay/Gourock–Dunoon; /Ardrossan-Brodick; 2011–2015: Laid up, Rosneath; 2015–2021: Repaired, use on Pentland Firth; 2021–2022: Towed to Greece, conversion work
- Builder: Ailsa Shipbuilding Company, Troon
- Yard number: 552
- Launched: 30 June 1977
- Maiden voyage: 2 February 1978
- Identification: IMO number: 7615490; Callsign: GXID; MMSI Number: 232003374
- Status: Undergoing refurbishment in Perama, Greece

General characteristics
- Tonnage: 851 GRT, 899 GT
- Length: 69.5 m (228 ft 0 in)
- Beam: 13.8 m (45 ft 3 in)
- Draft: 2.45 m (8 ft 1/2 in)
- Depth: 4 m (13 ft)
- Installed power: 2 × Mirrlees Blackstone 4SCSA 8-cylinder oil engines, 1,000 bhp (750 kW) each
- Propulsion: 2 Voith Schneider propellers, one at each end of the hull, on the centreline
- Speed: Approximately 12 kn (22 km/h)
- Capacity: 531 passengers, 38 cars
- Crew: 10

MV Orion (formerly MV Saturn and MV Orcadia) is a ro-ro passenger and vehicle ferry. Saturn was operated by Caledonian MacBrayne in the Firth of Clyde in Scotland between 1978 and 2011, for the first decade of her career on the Rothesay crossing. Later, she also saw service on the Dunoon and Brodick crossings, as well as on short cruises around the Clyde.

After a lengthy lay-up, she was sold in 2015 to Pentland Ferries, renamed Orcadia, and converted for ferry services work with the renewable energy sector around Orkney and the Pentland Firth. In 2021 she was sold to Creta Cargo Lines, Greece, renamed Orion, and towed to Perama for conversion to increase freight capacity.

== Description and Construction ==
Saturn was an evolution of the design used for the earlier Jupiter and Juno. Instead of conventional propellers, all three vessels had two fore-and-aft Voith-Schneider units, which had been successfully used on the fleet's 1972 Skye ferries. This propulsion system made the vessels fast and highly manoeuvrable compared to other vessels of the day, greatly reducing sailing and turnaround times and leading to them being nicknamed "Streakers".

The vessel incorporates a large open vehicle deck towards the stern, with passenger accommodation and services towards the bow across three decks. The design is of the roll-on/roll-off type, with vehicles boarding using either the stern ramp or one of the ramps amidships that lower to port and starboard respectively. She has two passenger lounges, one with a cafeteria. There is crew accommodation on the upper deck and open-air passenger areas.

Unlike Jupiter and Juno, Saturn's bridge was constructed one deck above the upper passenger deck, giving passenger access right around the front of the ship and allowing views directly over the bow. Saturn also did not have the large mast structure fitted above the car deck.

== History ==
=== CalMac Service ===
Together with her sister ships, Saturn formed a new generation of car ferries built in the 1970s to serve the routes on the Firth of Clyde. These ships were nicknamed the "Streakers" because of their greater speed (compared to what had served the area's routes previously) and superb manoeuvrability (due to their novel propulsion units).

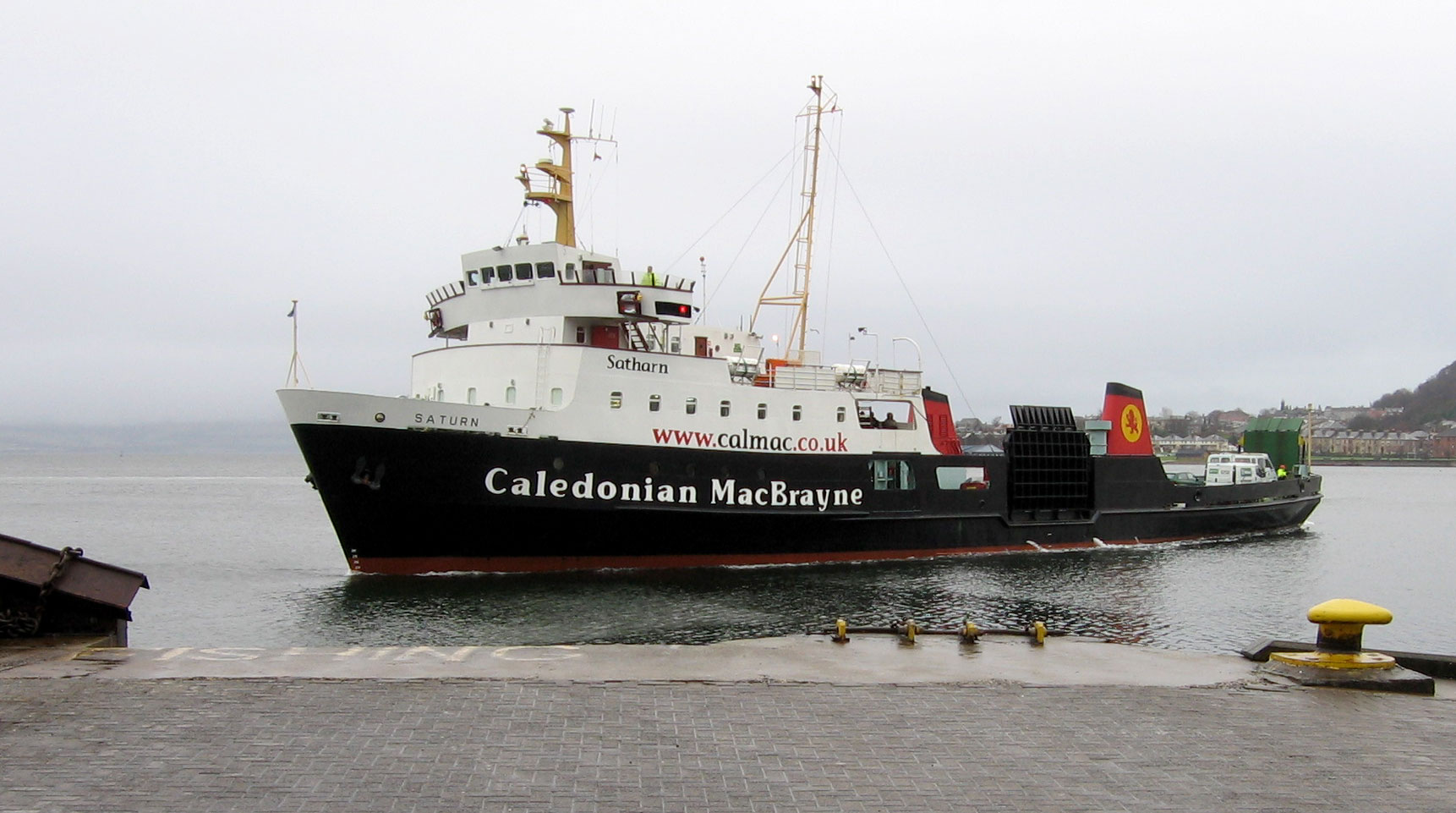
Saturn approaching Gourock pierhead, with "Caledonian Macbrayne" having replaced "Rothesay Ferry" on the hull.

With "Rothesay Ferry" emblazoned on her hull, Saturn operated primarily on the Wemyss Bay – Rothesay crossing for much of her first decade. From 1986, a new rostering policy saw the three streakers switching between the Rothesay and Dunoon routes. The third vessel provided additional peak sailings on both crossings, served Kilcreggan and, between 1993 and 1999, provided cruises on summer afternoons. Later, there were two vessels at Rothesay for most of the day with the former Western Isles' ship MV Pioneer providing additional capacity.

After more than 35 years, the Streakers were replaced by a new generation of CalMac ferries designed for the Upper Firth, just as in the 1970s they had replaced an earlier generation. Bute came into service on the Rothesay route in 2005, followed by Argyle in 2007. With Bute's introduction, Saturn moved down the firth to Ardrossan, assisting Caledonian Isles on the Brodick crossing during summer, and acting as a spare vessel during the winter. Major work at Rothesay throughout the winter of 2006/2007 required the vastly superior maneuverability of the 'Streakers' for access to the pier and Saturn with sister ship Juno were in service for the duration of the winter while newer ships Bute and MV Coruisk were laid up. This continued until April 2007 when the newer ships could resume service. Sister ship of Bute, MV Argyle entered service the following month which allowed Saturn to return to her summer duties at Arran.

In September 2007 Saturn became the first and only 'streaker' to leave the Firth of Clyde when she carried out berthing trials at Port Ellen, Port Askaig and Kennacraig to test her suitability on the Islay service. Saturn also carried out special cruises from Gourock and Dunoon to mark the return of Cunard liner Queen Elizabeth 2 to the Firth of Clyde upon the liner's 40th anniversary in 2007 and her final visit to the Clyde in 2008.

==== Last of the Clyde Streakers ====
Juno was taken out of service in 2007, and laid up at Rosneath until she was dismantled there in 2011. In October 2010, Saturn took over the Dunoon sailings from older sister Jupiter, which was laid up at Rosneath as spare vessel for that winter, although she never saw service again, and on 25 June 2011 she was towed away to be broken up in Denmark.

Saturn was the main ferry on the Gourock–Dunoon route for the last 9 months of the vehicle crossing, before the route was made passenger only. The Caledonian MacBrayne vehicle service there finished on 29 June 2011, and Saturn returned to assisting at Ardrossan. She was back on the Bute run on 20 August 2011 to provide extra sailings for the Bute Highland Games, subsequently returning to Gourock on 27 August 2011 to help out the Argyll Ferries passenger ferries on the busiest weekend of the year for the Cowal Gathering (Highland Games) in Dunoon. These turned out to be her final passenger sailings for Calmac, as she was no longer required in the fleet with no Gourock-Dunoon vehicle service and the MV Isle of Arran being spare following the introduction of the MV Finlaggan.

=== Laid up at Rosneath ===
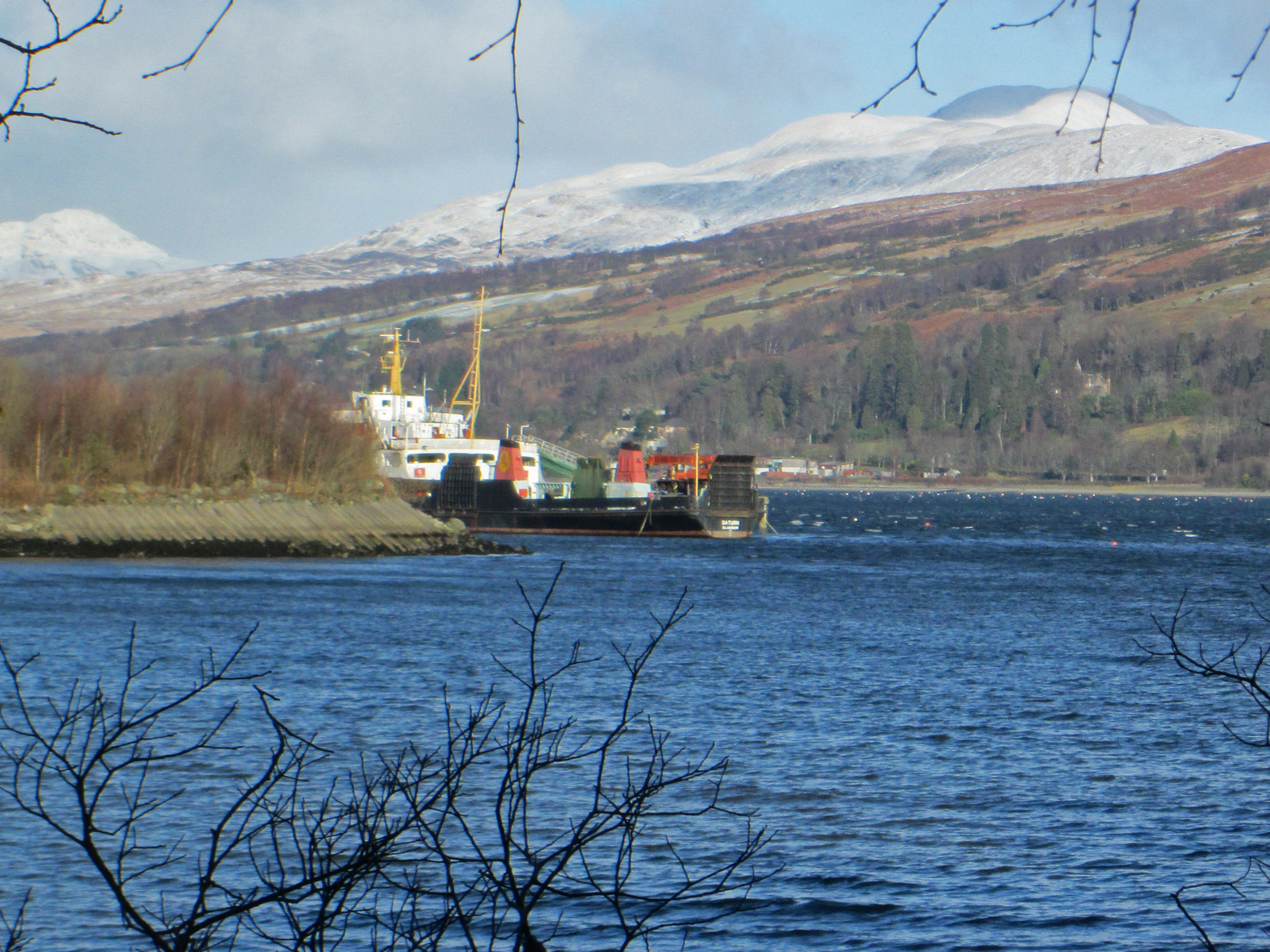
Saturn in January 2015, laid up at Rosneath

Saturn was de-stored at Gourock and moved to Rosneath on 30 August 2011. She was laid up, awaiting a decision on future service.

In November 2011, she moved to the inside of the pier to clear a space for the MV Coruisk. By March 2012, despite still shown as a "relief" vessel for Calmac, it was suggested that the vessel had been at least partially stripped since being laid up - frustrating calls by local activists to have her re-instated on the Dunoon-Gourock route as a replacement for the MV Ali Cat. By July 2012, Saturn had been de-registered from the Calmac fleet. She had no sailing certificate and this was highly unlikely to be renewed with MV Isle of Arran having taken over her only remaining work, the Summer additional sailing to Brodick from Ardrossan.

By 2014, there seemed to be little progress with the future of the vessel. In response to the ships ongoing deterioration whilst laid up at Rosneath, a small grass roots campaign was launched by those interested and passionate in the fate of MV Saturn.

In November 2014, the group announced they had been in talks over the fate of the vessel, and now had an opportunity to move forward. In December, the "Campaign to Save MV Saturn" merged with other efforts from across Scotland and the UK to see the vessel saved, and in turn launched one last surge on making an appeal to save the vessel. It was expected that Saturn was set to be scrapped in early 2015, with the final decision expected to be given that February.

=== Pentland Ferries ===
Saturn remains as the last and youngest of the Clyde Streakers.

After years of speculation, CMAL announced in February 2015 that Saturn had been sold to Pentland Ferries to be converted for use as a freighter and for renewable energy work around Orkney and the Pentland Firth.

On 25 February Saturn was towed from her berth at Rosneath to the Garvel dry dock in Greenock for a major overhaul, sharing the dock with the sail training ship Stavros S Niarchos. Both ships were un-docked and towed round to the James Watt Dock in early March 2015. The lower part of Saturn's hull had been painted red, and repainting in Pentland Ferries red livery continued, with their logo soon replacing the CalMac logo on the funnel. The ship returned to dry dock under her own power on 23 March 2015, and over the following weeks the full Pentland Ferries livery was applied and steel work was carried out. Dry docking was complete by early April and the ship returned to James Watt Dock. On 10 April 2015 the new name Orcadia was painted on the bow and stern of the vessel.

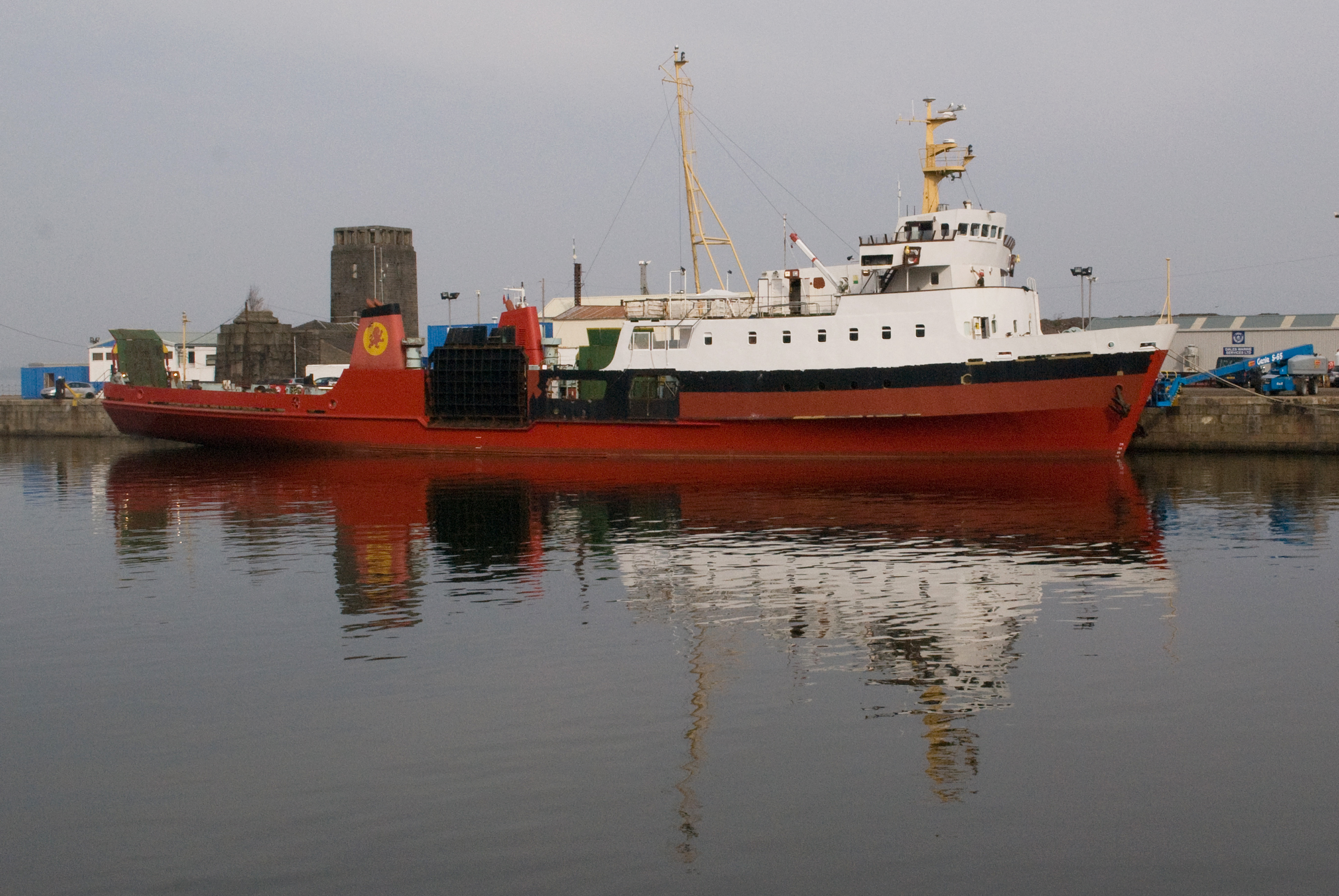
Saturn being repainted in the James Watt Dock, Greenock

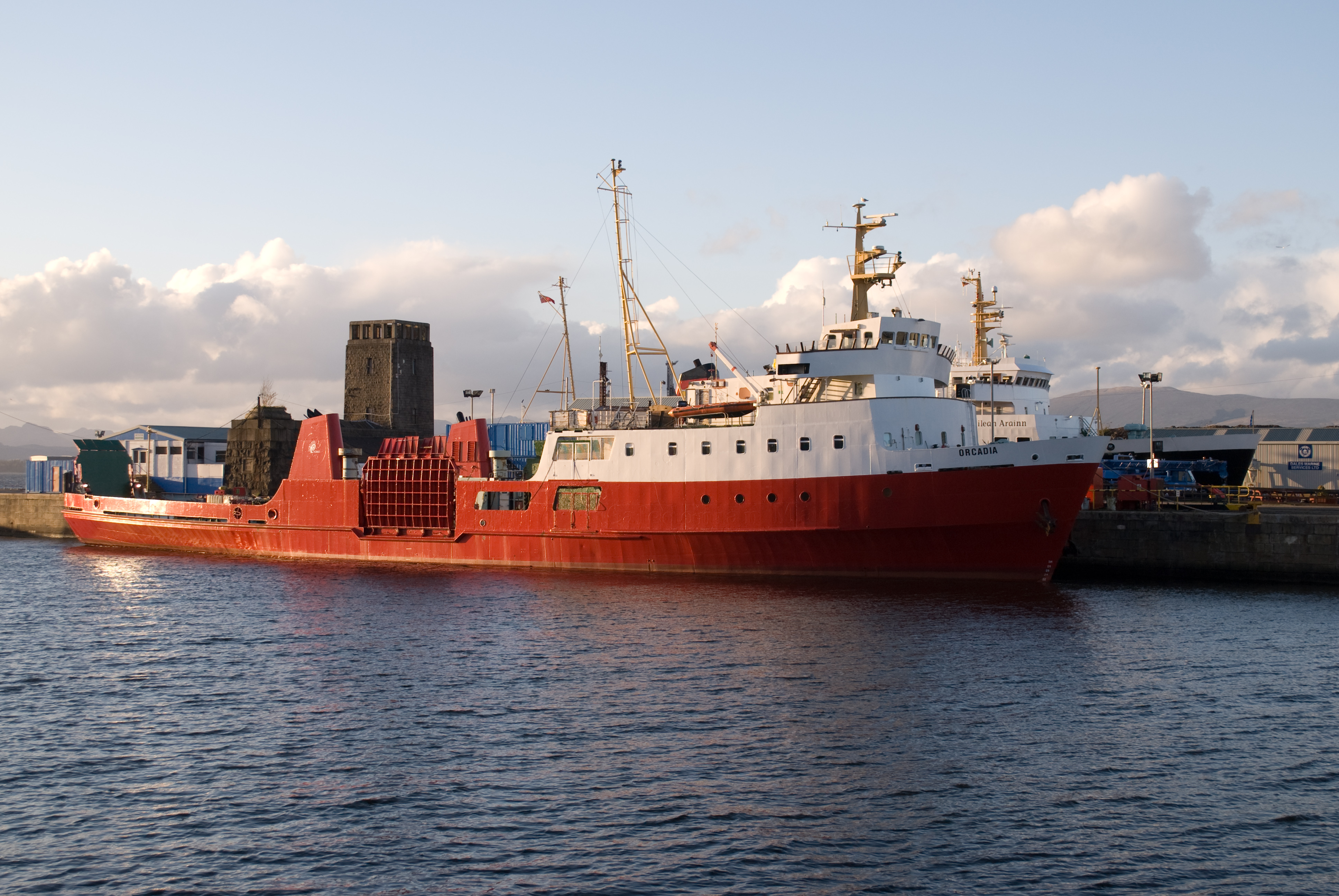
Renamed Orcadia, in the James Watt Dock, with MV Isle of Arran behind in the Garvel dry dock

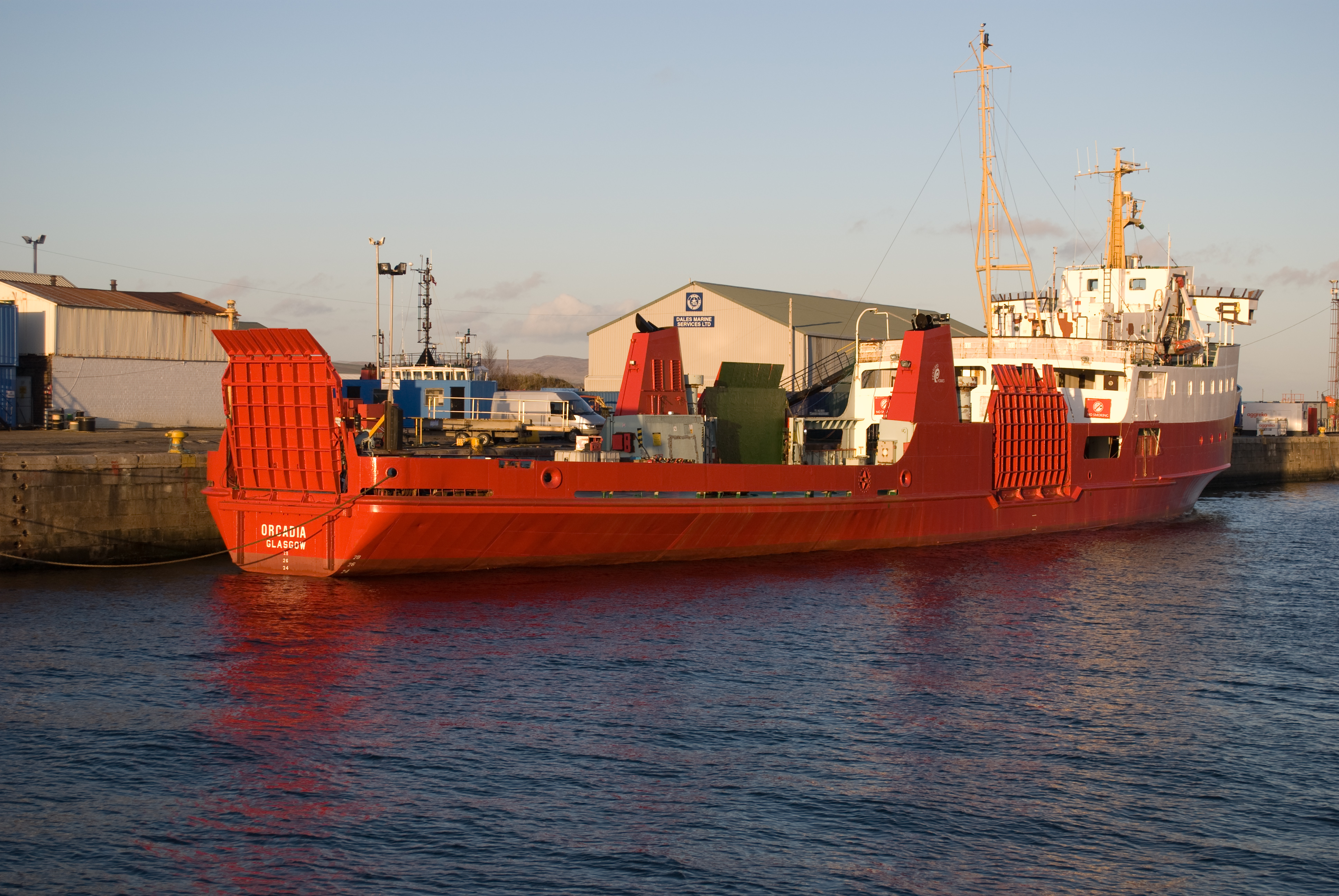
Stern view of Orcadia, registered in Glasgow

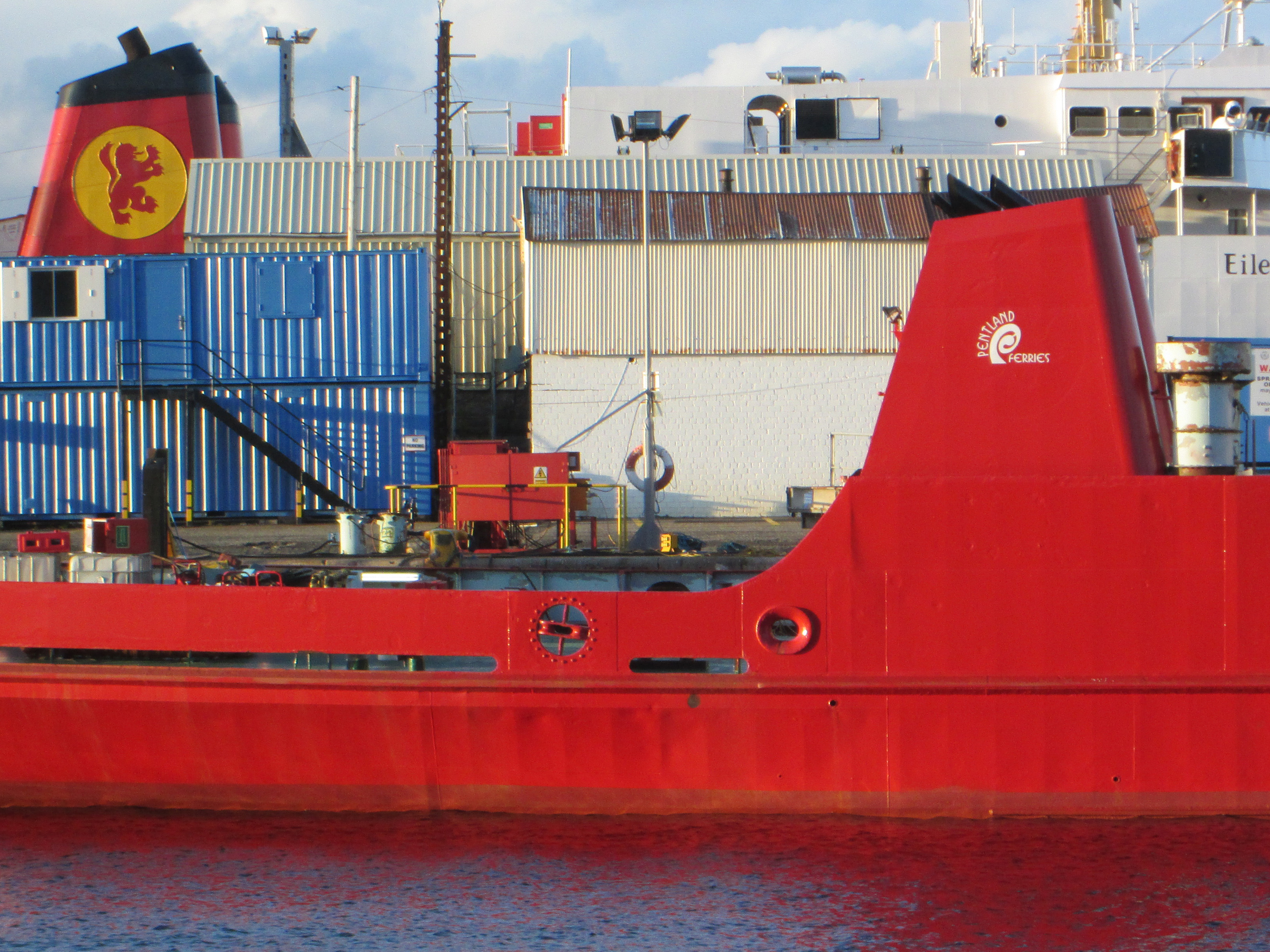
Funnels, showing the logos of CalMac and Pentland Ferries

Orcadia left James Watt Dock on 22 April 2015 and headed north, leaving her home waters of the Firth of Clyde. She arrived at St. Margaret's Hope on the morning of 24 April 2015 and carried out short berthing trials. Further work was carried out following her arrival at Stromness. On 16 December 2016 Orcadia was moved back to Pentland Ferries' home port of St. Margaret's Hope for further work and inspection. In January 2017, and after almost 2 years of ownership under Pentland Ferries, Orcadia appeared for sale. In 2018, Arran based Scotslion Ferries Ltd considered buying her to provide a freight-only service to Arran, following disruption to the Ardrossan to Brodick service earlier in the summer. Unfortunately this was later abandoned after they realised the ship was not suitable.

=== Cretan Cargo Lines ===
In 2021, Orcadia was sold to Creta Cargo Lines to provide a Passenger and Vehicle service between Mainland Greece and the Aegean Islands. On 12 November 2021, Orcadia left St Margaret's Hope for the last time. She was towed by tugboat Christos LXI, and later arrived in Perama on 5 December 2021. She was expected to enter service from mainland Greece to the Aegean Islands in summer 2022. By 14 July 2022, she had been renamed Orion, and extensive conversion work was being carried out by Spanopoulos Shipyards to increase the ship's freight capacity. In February 2023, she began sailing between Lavrio (SE of Athens) and the Greek islands.

WSET AFRICAN VENTURE TO CAMEROON

With only two years in Greek service she was reflagged under Togo leaving the Greek Islands in December 2023 to make the long voyage with several stopovers arriving in Tiko Cameroon around the 7th February 2024 for further use
