= Gourock railway station =

Railway station in Inverclyde, Scotland

Gourock Scottish Gaelic: Gurraig
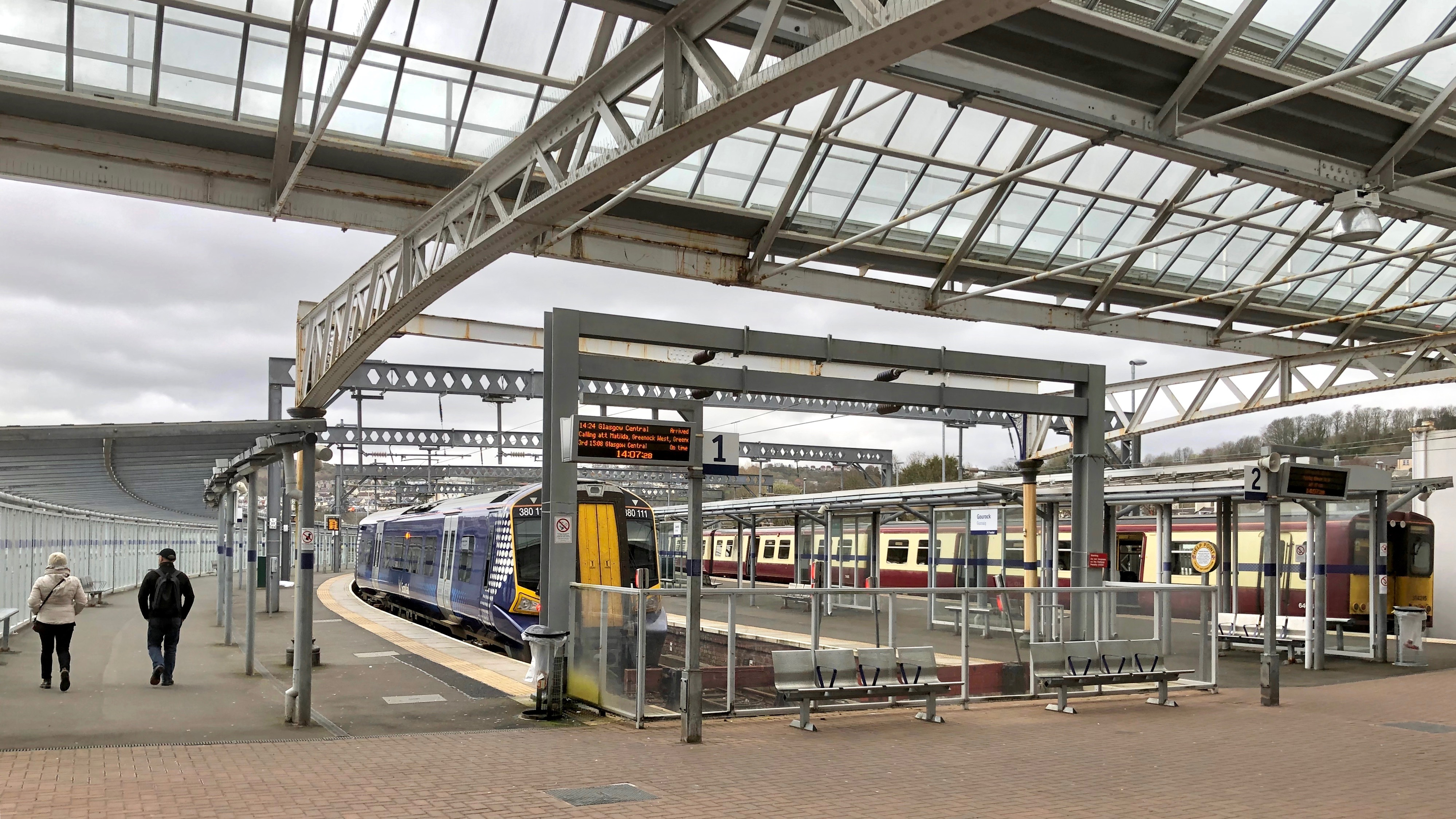
- Concourse, with walkway to ferry terminal

General information
- Location: Gourock, Inverclyde; Scotland
- Coordinates: 55.9619°N 4.8158°W
- Grid reference: NS243779
- Manager: ScotRail
- Platforms: 3

Other information
- Station code: GRK

Key dates
- 1 June 1889: Opened

Passengers
- 2021/22: ▲0.248 million
- 2022/23: ▲0.324 million
- 2023/24: ▲0.374 million
- 2024/25: ▲0.401 million
- 2025/26: ▲0.406 million
Location
Notes
- Passenger statistics from the Office of Rail and Road

Gourock railway station is a terminus of the Inverclyde Line, located at Gourock pierhead, Scotland. It was originally closely integrated with an extensive clyde steamer pier as well as serving the coastal resort town. The ferry services terminal is now located at the east end of platform 1, with provision for vehicle ferries.

== History ==
The Caledonian Railway found that its service to Greenock Central station, which was an inconvenient walk away from the quay, was losing Clyde steamer trade to the new Glasgow and South Western Railway terminal at Greenock Princes Pier railway station. So the Caledonian extended its line through a new tunnel to the coastal resort town of Gourock. The railway ran on the seaward side of Shore Street to the terminal, which opened on 1 June 1889. The headquarters of the Caledonian steamer fleet was subsequently based there. The station was designed by the architect, James Miller, and engineer-in-chief, George Graham. The initial services in 1889 were 26 trains daily from Glasgow to Gourock, with one additional service on Saturdays. The fastest journey time was 40 minutes, and each train could carry 604 passengers; 224 in first class and the rest in third class.

Inspector Halliday, from the western district of the Caledonian Railway, was appointed stationmaster, and Mr Anderson, assistant stationmaster at Cathcart Street Station at Greenock, was appointed assistant stationmaster.

The station was built to accommodate large numbers of passengers boarding the steamers. Originally the curving station platform had 17 canopy bays each side over three railway lines, with three bays of full width and the westernmost 19 bays covering the one line which continued on. A central concourse with adjacent offices and stores fronted the pier.

On 16 June 1935, a holiday train overran the platform and collided with the buffers. Three people were hospitalised.

On 12 December 1957, a fire broke out in the station building. The refreshment room and waiting rooms were badly damaged.

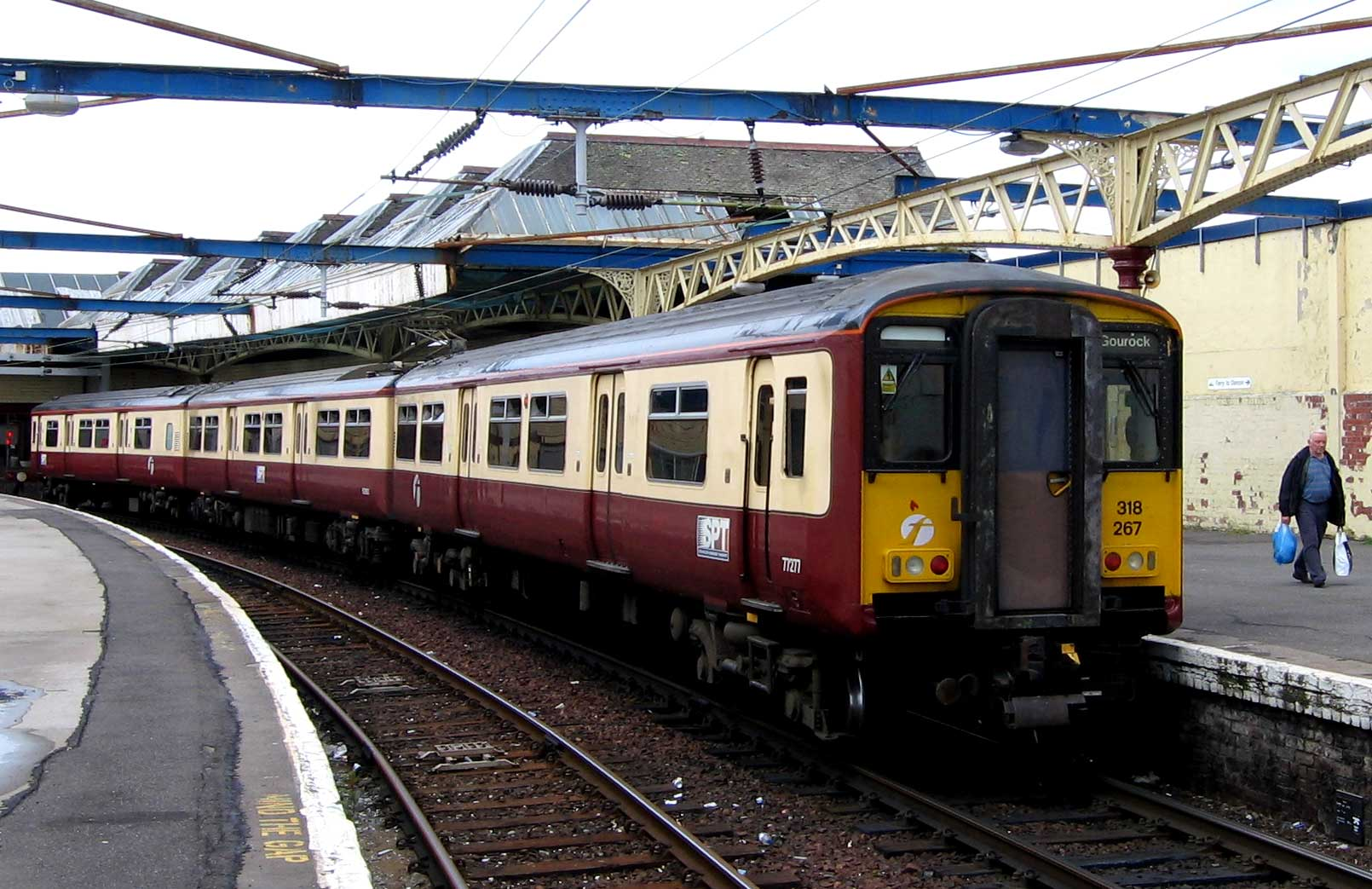
Class 318 train at original platform canopies remaining in 2006

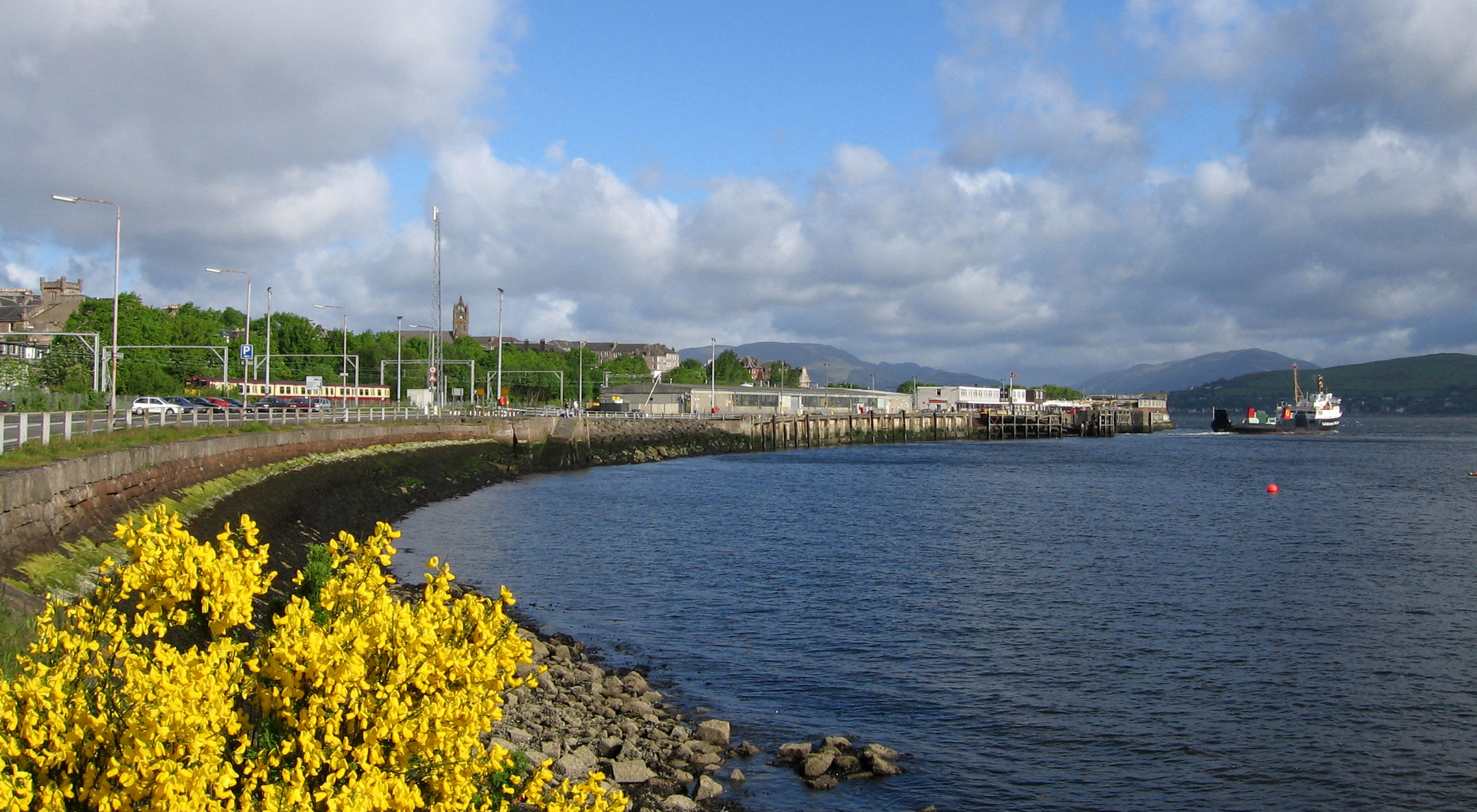
Class 314 train leaving the pierhead as a ferry sets off for Dunoon

The line from Glasgow was electrified as part of the Inverclyde Line electrification scheme by British Rail. The 25 kV AC system was used, and electric operation commenced in September 1967.

In the 1980s, the westernmost end of the station was cut back by 18 bays, and in the 1990s, the adjacent timber quay was demolished. Subsequently, the remaining glazed canopies over the platforms were taken down, leaving only the cast iron supporting structure, slate roofs and glazed canopies over a section incorporating a ticket office and a waiting room. The adjacent Bay Hotel was also demolished in the 1990s, with its site being grassed over. In 2006, a portable ticket office was installed at the end wall, which had been erected when the station was cut back and the old ticket office was closed.

Approval was given in 1999 for plans by Inverclyde Council, Caledonian MacBrayne and Railtrack, which involved shortening the railway tracks and constructing a new station adjacent to Caledonian MacBrayne's headquarters. That formed part of a major development scheme, with the space formerly occupied by the station, together with the grassed area which had been the site of the Bay Hotel, providing space for two major supermarkets and housing. Alexander George was appointed preferred developer.

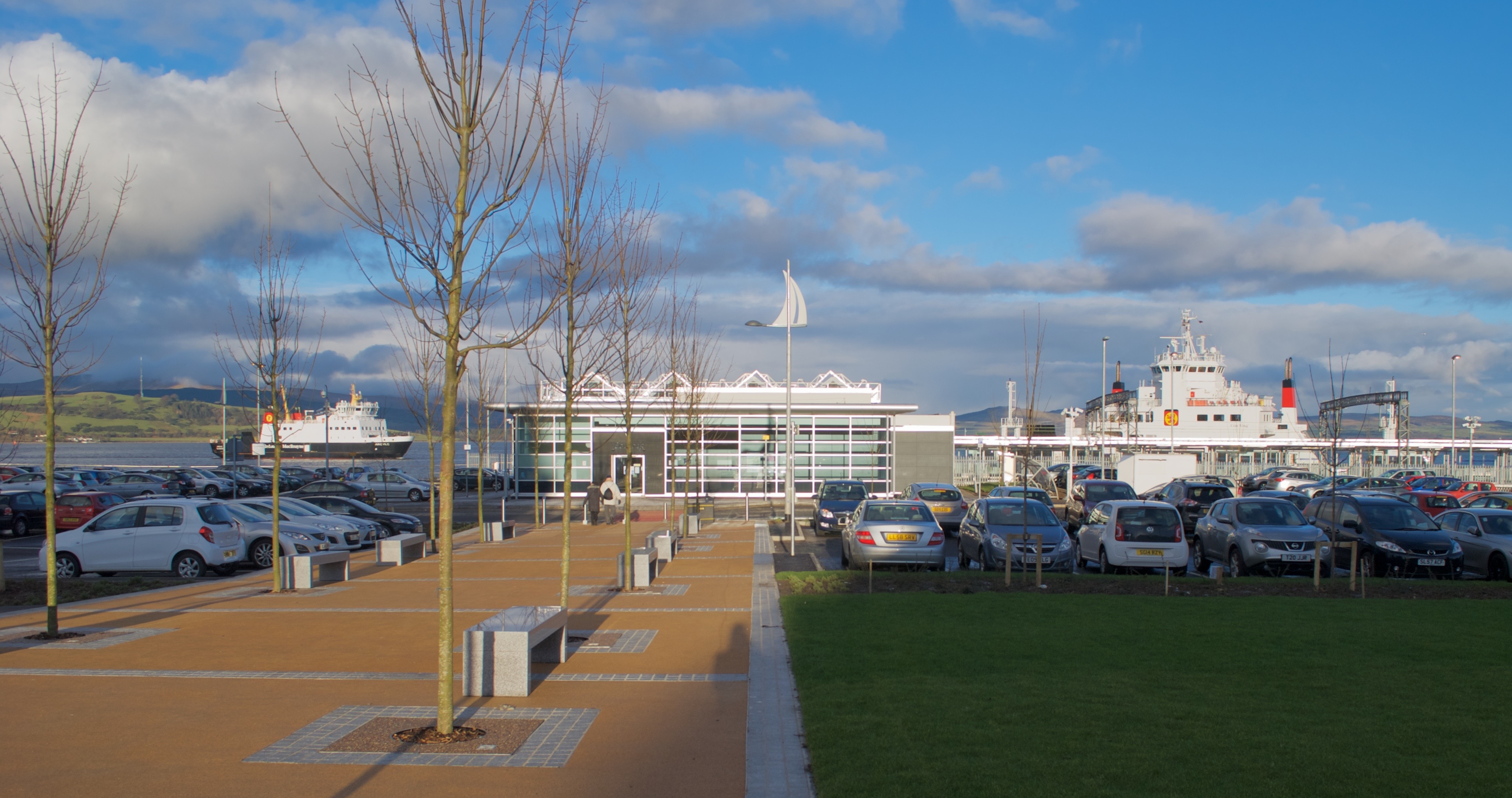
Landscaped approach from Shore Street to Gourock railway station, with MV Argyle and MV Coruisk heading to and from the ferry terminal.

However, Network Rail was slow to come to an agreement on relocating the station. The work involved in shortening the tracks would have involved considerable expense and the closure of the station for 18 months. The delay left the station looking rather neglected. Near the end of September 2006, new plans were announced, following intervention by the transport minister Tavish Scott. A considerable saving was to be made by not moving the station so far, so that the work involved was reduced, with the station only closing for four or five weeks. Only one supermarket was now proposed, with 580 houses being constructed in blocks facing out onto the Clyde.

In the interim, the station was renovated, at a predicted cost of £630,000, to provide a new entrance, glass roof and toilets, as well as improved waiting facilities. David Simpson, route director of Network Rail in Scotland, advised that essential work had to be carried out to make the station more comfortable for the 400,000 passengers using it every year, while work would continue to "explore the longer-term options for the station with our industry partners".

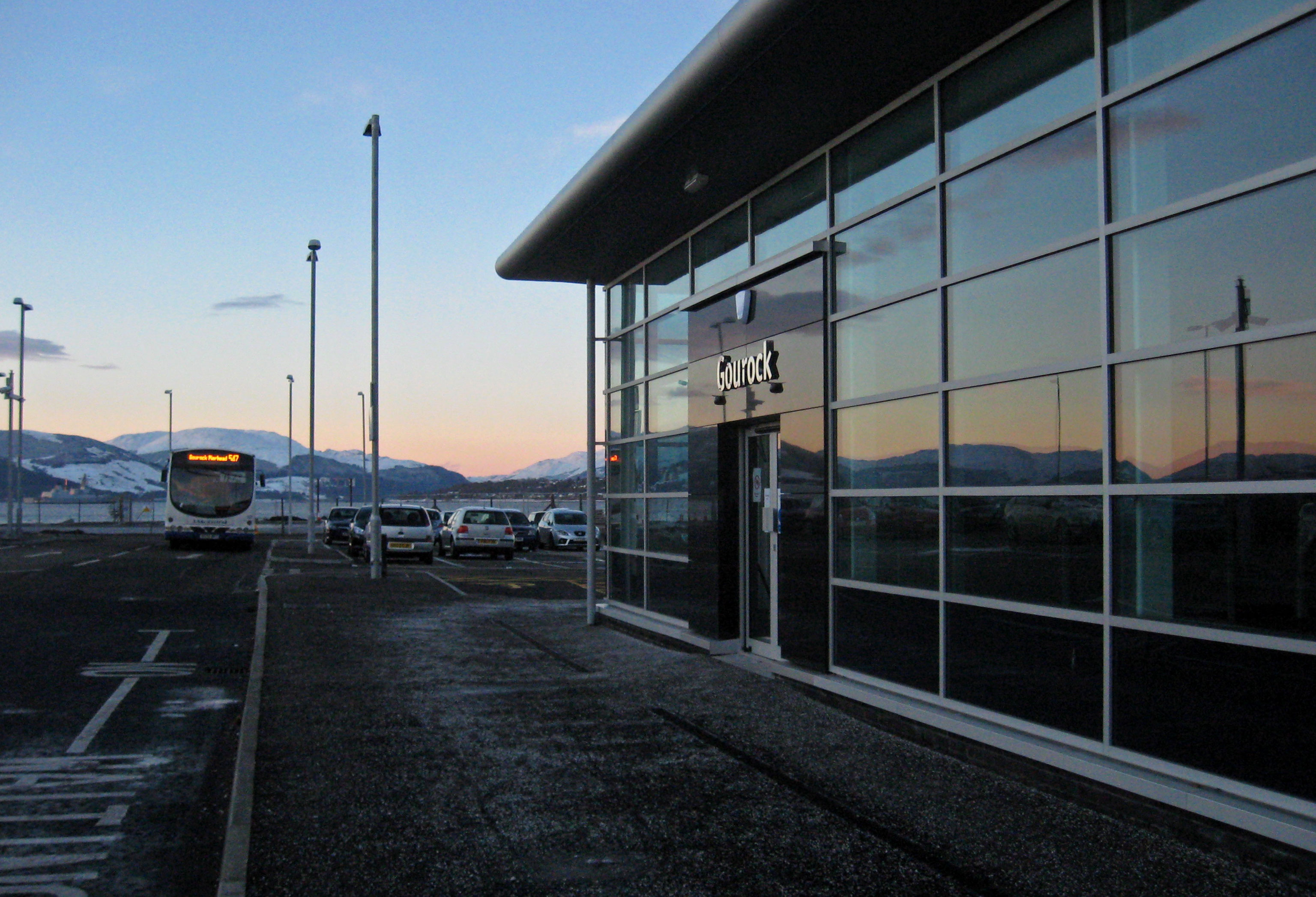
The new ticket office in November 2010

A new station building, designed by IDP Architects, was completed in 2010. Work on demolishing the existing canopies and providing new shelters on platforms proceeded through 2011. The new station building was officially opened on 1 August 2012 by Alex Neil MSP and Gourock Councillor Chris McEleny, with all works having cost £8m.

As part of a new one-way system completed in 2016, the station approach was reorganised, with new car parking and a promenade along past Kempock Point.

The station is fully staffed seven days per week throughout the hours of service. Three platforms are in use.

== Services ==
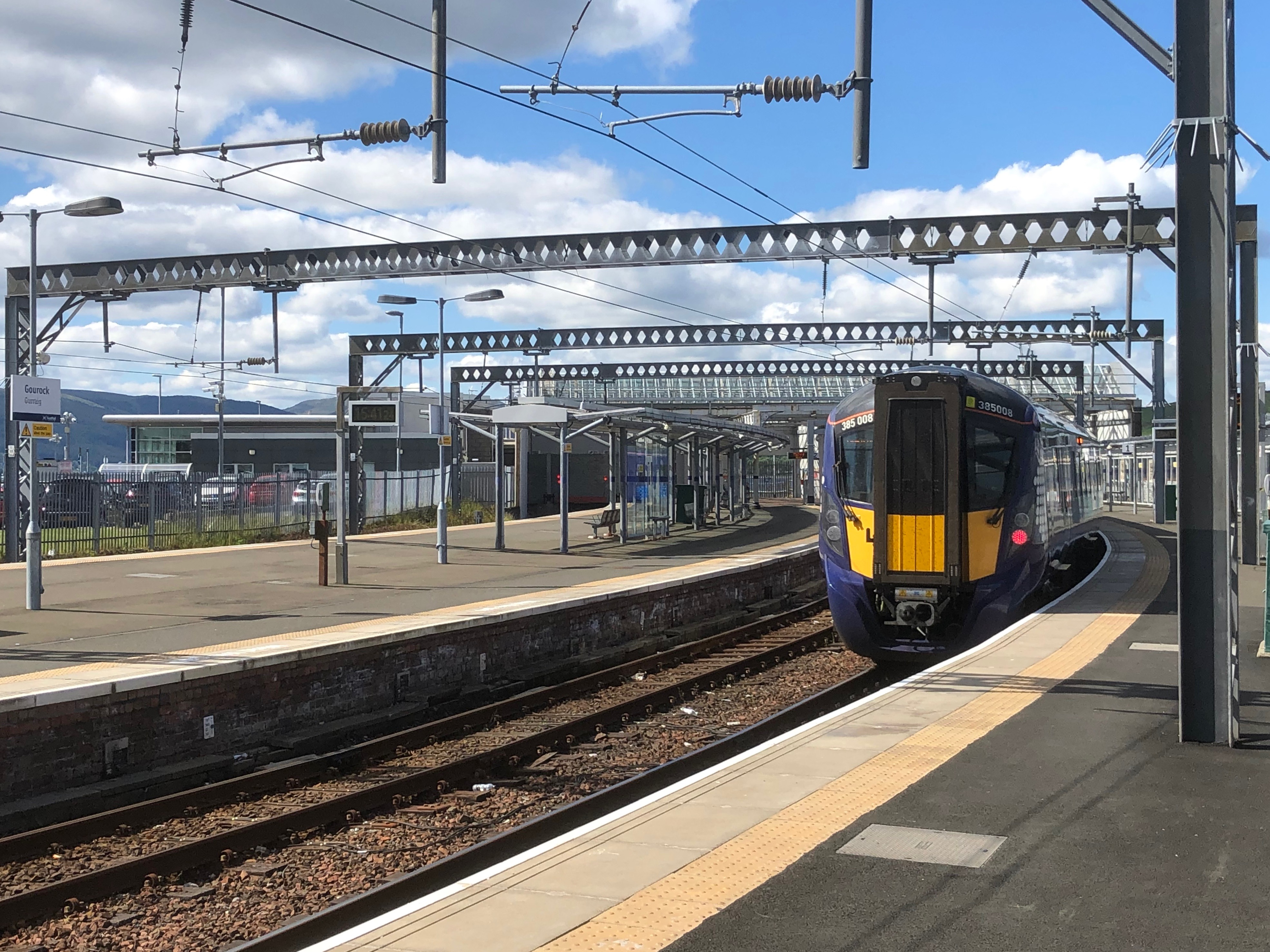
Station buildings seen from platform 1, with a Class 385 train in service.

As of November 2024, there is typically a half-hourly service to Glasgow Central, which calls at all stations to Port Glasgow, then semi-fast to Glasgow Central via Paisley Gilmour Street. There are a small number of additional services during peak hours. On Sunday. the service is still 2 tph, but many trains operate as all-stations stopping services after Port Glasgow.

The ferry terminal is the headquarters of Caledonian MacBrayne (CalMac), which runs a passenger ferries to Dunoon and Kilcreggan from the pier. The vehicle linkspan and foot passenger steps are sited at the end of Platform 1, about 340 metres (1,120 ft) from the railway station entrance, at the end of its access road leading from Tarbert Street.

Services originated with the Caledonian Steam Packet Company (CSP) in 1889, it began car ferry services in 1954 using ferries with a car hoist to get vehicles to the tidal height of the pier, starting with MV Arran. In 1971 a roll on/roll off hydraulic linkspan was installed, shortly after this CSP was merged into CalMac. In 2011 Gourock services to Dunoon were made pedestrian only, the linkspan continued to be used for vehicles when ferry traffic was diverted from Wemyss Bar or Ardrossan, due to high winds or maintenance work. The passenger only ferry services were put to tender, and the contract awarded to CalMac subsidiary Argyll Ferries, operating MV Argyll Flyer and MV Ali Cat on the Dunoon run. The subsidiary was merged into CalMac in 2019. MV Chieftain serves Kilcreggan.

| Preceding station | National Rail | Following station |
|---|---|---|
| Terminus | ScotRail; Inverclyde Line | Fort Matilda |
| | Ferry services | |
| Dunoon | Caledonian MacBrayne; Cowal Ferry | Terminus |
| Kilcreggan | Caledonian MacBrayne; Kilcreggan Ferry | Terminus |
| | Historical railways | |
| Terminus | Caledonian Railway; Glasgow, Paisley and Greenock Railway | Fort Matilda |

== Bibliography ==
- Smith, R.M. (1921), The History of Greenock, Greenock: Orr, Pollock & Co, archived from the original on 3 June 2021 (Inverclyde Council website)
