= Argyll Ferries =

Scottish ferry company

Argyll Ferries Ltd
- Type: Private Limited Company
- Industry: Transport
- Founded: 2011
- Founder: Scottish Government
- Headquarters: Gourock, Scotland, UK,
- Area served: Gourock and Dunoon, Firth of Clyde
- Services: Ferries
- Owner: Scottish Government
- Parent: David MacBrayne Ltd
- Divisions: Caledonian MacBrayne, Argyll Ferries
- Website: www.argyllferries.co.uk

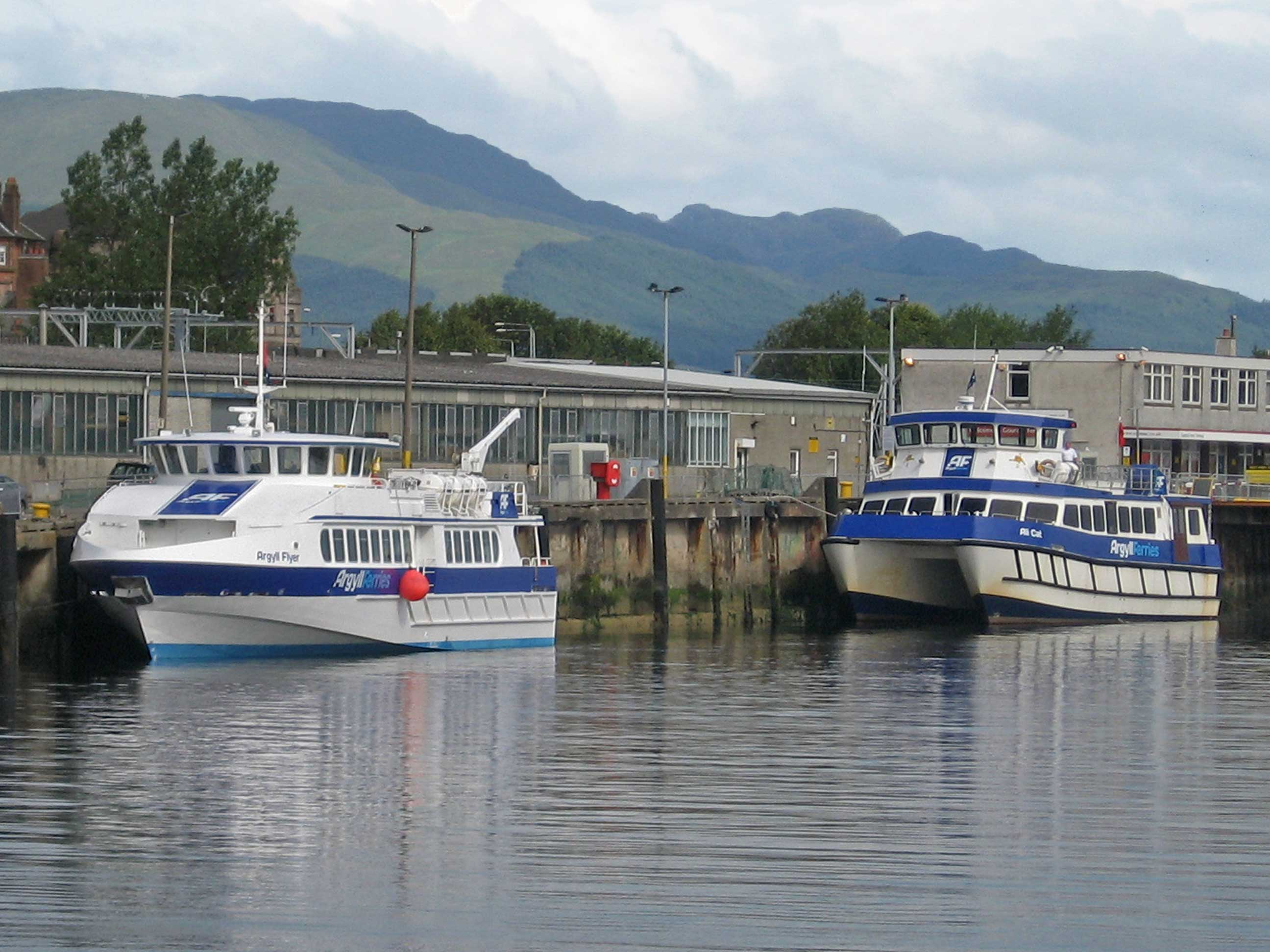
Argyll Flyer and Ali Cat in their then-new Argyll Ferries livery, at Gourock pierhead.

Argyll Ferries Ltd was a ferry company formed in January 2011 by the Scottish Governments department of Transport Scotland via the parent company David MacBrayne Ltd to tender for the Dunoon-to-Gourock public service route. Argyll Ferries were announced as the preferred bidder at the end of May 2011, contracts were exchanged on 7 June 2011 for the service, the service then commenced 23 days later on 30 June 2011.

The Argyll Ferries service has suffered from cancellations due to technical problems, or limitations of the small vessels in unfavourable weather. When this occurs, the ferry company provides a relief bus service taking passengers from Gourock railway station and pierhead to their destination via the Western Ferries Hunters Quay to McInroy's Point ferry. In winter since 2016, the larger CalMac ferry MV Coruisk is redeployed to Gourock for peak sailings, and provides a relief service when conditions are too severe for the smaller boats.

From 21 January 2019 the Argyll Ferries service was transferred by Transport Scotland into the existing Caledonian MacBrayne Clyde and Hebrides Ferry Service contract, continuing with the same staff and boats. CalMac branding was introduced over the following months, and Transport Scotland were to reconsider vessel and service requirements at some stage.

== Fleet ==
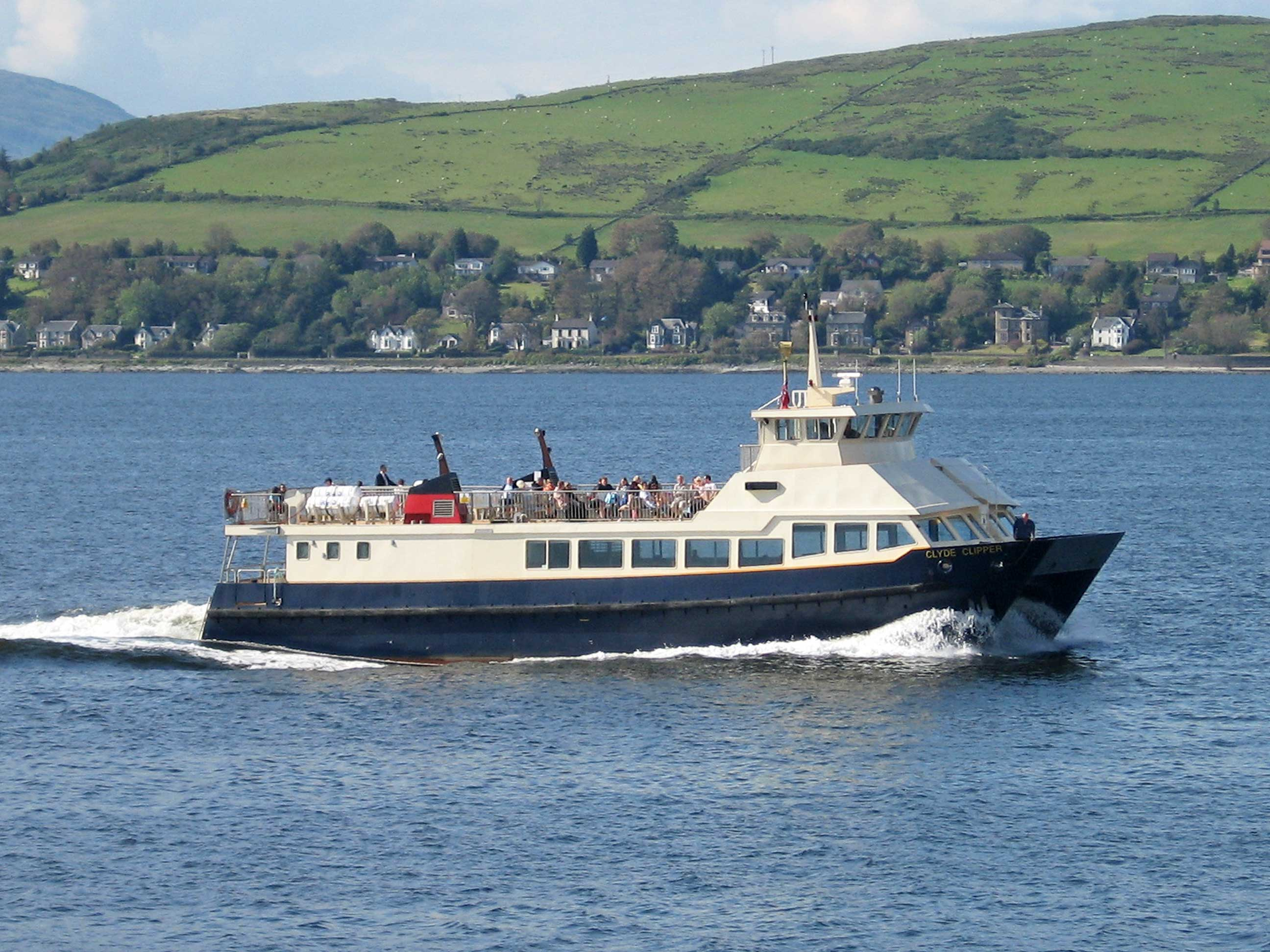
MV Clyde Clipper arriving at Gourock, on the Argyll Ferries service from Dunoon.

Argyll Ferries Ltd operates two passenger vessels on the route, MV Ali Cat and MV Argyll Flyer. Both are leased from their owner Caledonian Maritime Assets. Caledonian Maritime Assets Ltd (CMAL) had previously run the Ali Cat on a 9-year lease from Isle of Wight Cruises but she was bought outright for the new service. The Argyll Flyer, formerly the ten-year-old Irish ferry, Banríon Chonamara, was purchased specifically for the new service.

When the service began on 30 June 2011, preparation of the Argyll Flyer had been held up by broken rear prop shafts. As an interim measure the cruise boat MV Clyde Clipper was leased from Clyde Cruises to start the service. She suffered breakdowns during the first day, then continued in interim service alongside the other two ferries for a short period.

In the past, ferries operated by Caledonian MacBrayne have provided additional support on the route; notably the MV Saturn during the Cowal Gathering in August 2011 and the MV Coruisk in December 2013.

== Route ==
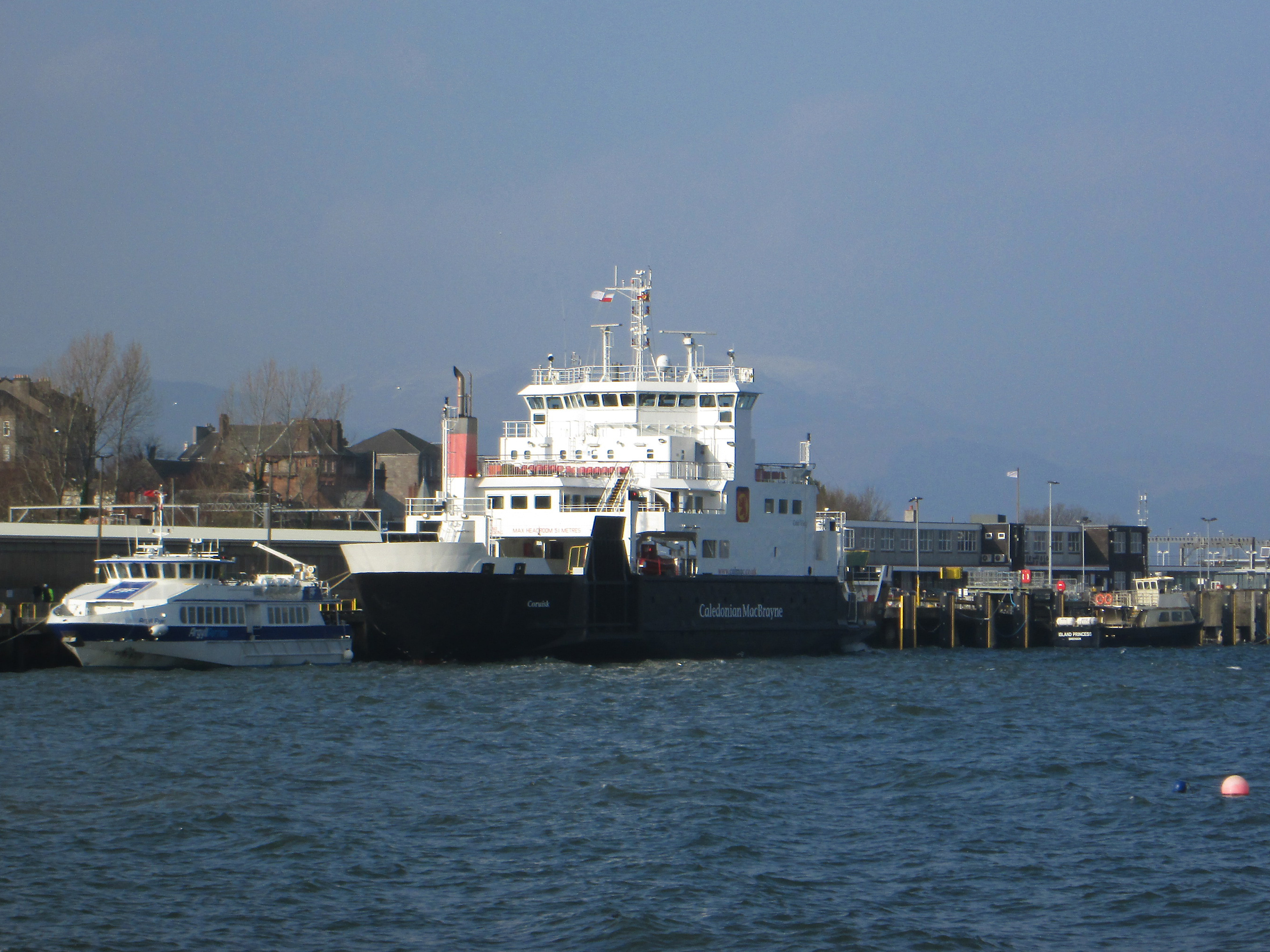
MV Argyll Flyer and Caledonian MacBrayne car ferry MV Coruisk on standby at Gourock Pier in February 2017 while Gourock–Dunoon sailings were suspended due to adverse weather.

The service operates between a vehicle linkspan at the breakwater in Dunoon town centre and a vehicle linkspan in Gourock town centre immediately adjacent to Gourock rail terminal. Regular trains to Glasgow Central via Paisley are available from the train station.

Dunoon is located on the Cowal Peninsula. The service by Argyll Ferries saves journey time as the road route along Loch Eck (A815 road) side, Rest and be thankful (A83 road) and Loch Lomond (A82 road) side, is a far longer journey.

== Contract ==
A previous report by Deloitte Touche on options for the route stated that, for a passenger only service, "Large hulls are required to suit Upper Clyde water, but the vessels would be fitted out to accommodate only 150 people, which would meet the requirements of passenger traffic on most days of the year." Concerns were expressed about the suitability of these small boats in rough weather. However a spokesman for the parent company of the ferry operators, David MacBrayne Ltd, gave assurances that the ferries were suitable, and would have the advantage of using the new sheltered berth at Dunoon instead of the old pier, which is more exposed.

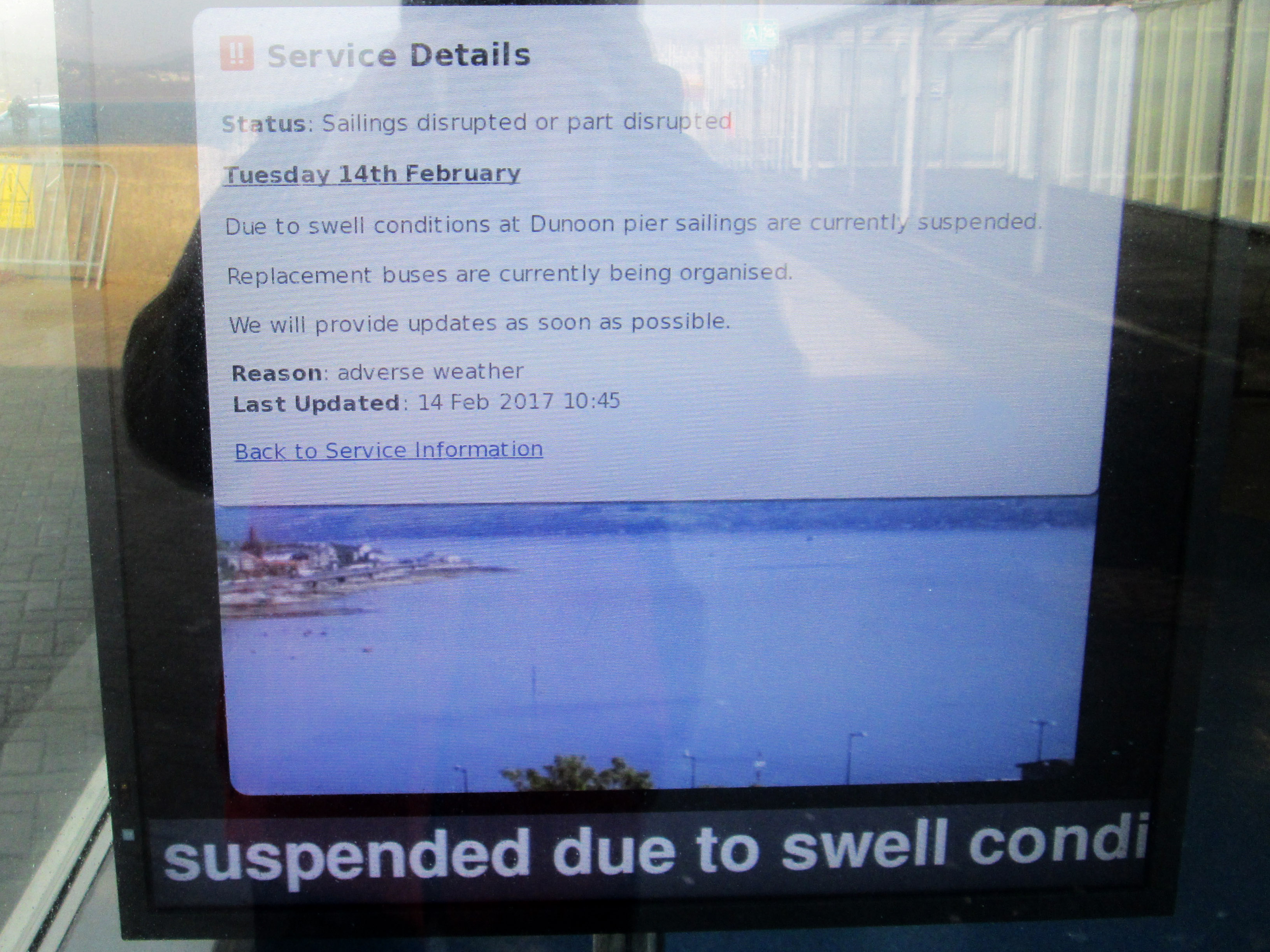
February 2017; "sailings suspended due to swell conditions at Dunoon Pier, replacement buses being organised."

The service is operated under a Public Service Contract produced by Transport Scotland, a department of the Scottish Government. The contract permits sailings that fail to take place due to safety considerations including adverse weather to be counted as if they had sailed for the purposes of reliability under the contract, subject to due diligence to minimise such delays. The contract also permits each boat to have two weeks per year of scheduled maintenance therefore, since there is no provision for relief vessels, a half service operates for at least four weeks each year.

== Performance updates ==
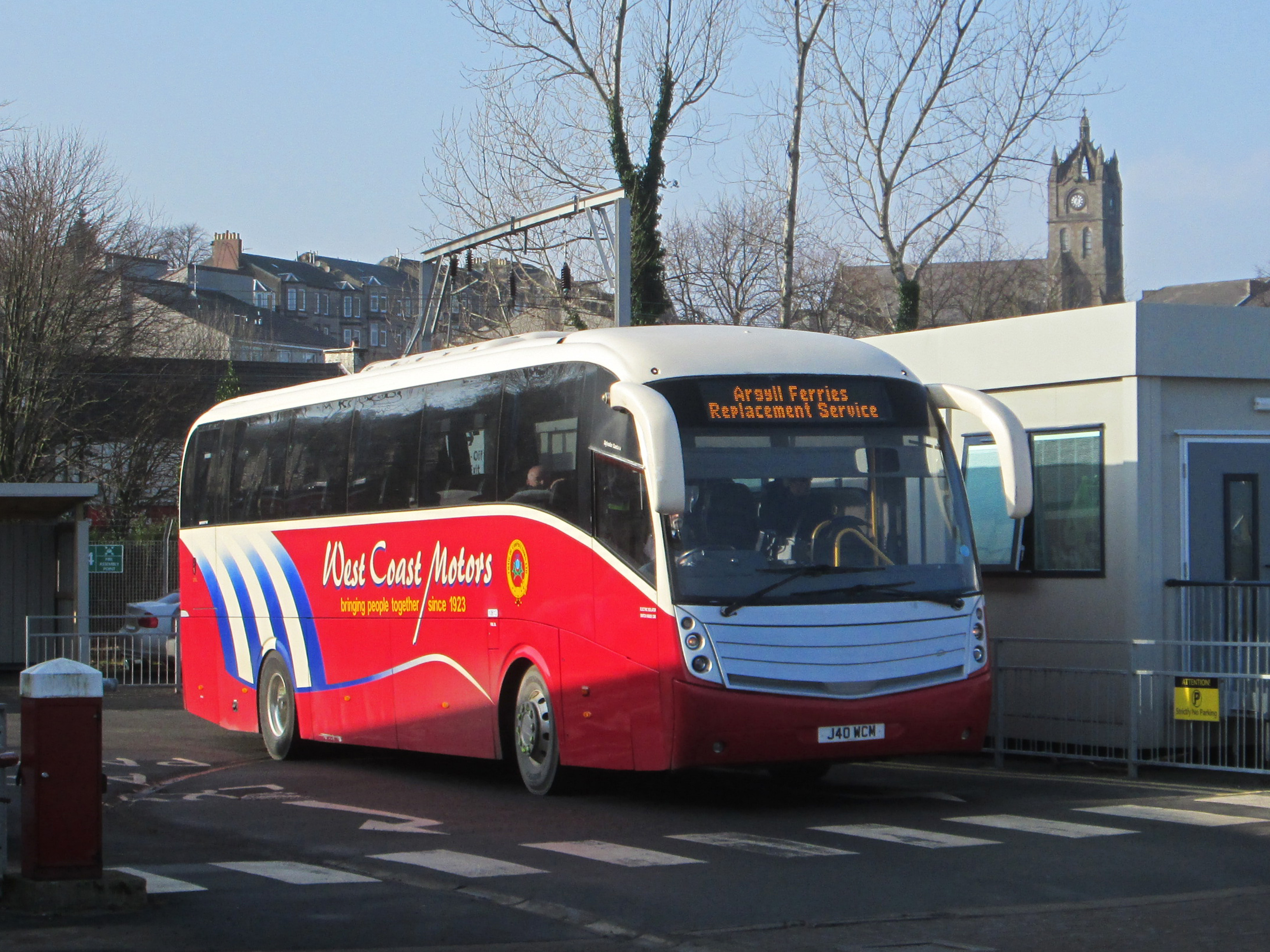
West Coast Motors bus; "Argyll Ferries Replacement Service" via Western Ferries.

In November 2011 the service suffered 88 weather-related cancellations, with 138 such cancellations in December. Figures indicated cancellation or disruption of 3.6% of sailings since July. In response to complaints from passengers, the Scottish Government cabinet secretary Alex Neil said the service was "not fit for purpose" and said he had asked the company to produce an improvement plan.

In March 2012 Argyll Ferries announced performance figures for February and March. They stated that the service had been very reliable contractually, showing good punctuality, and said that passenger numbers were beginning to increase. In April the service cancelled 99 sailings Weather and technical failures continue to be problematic in 2014, 2015, and 2016, with continued numerous service cancellations.

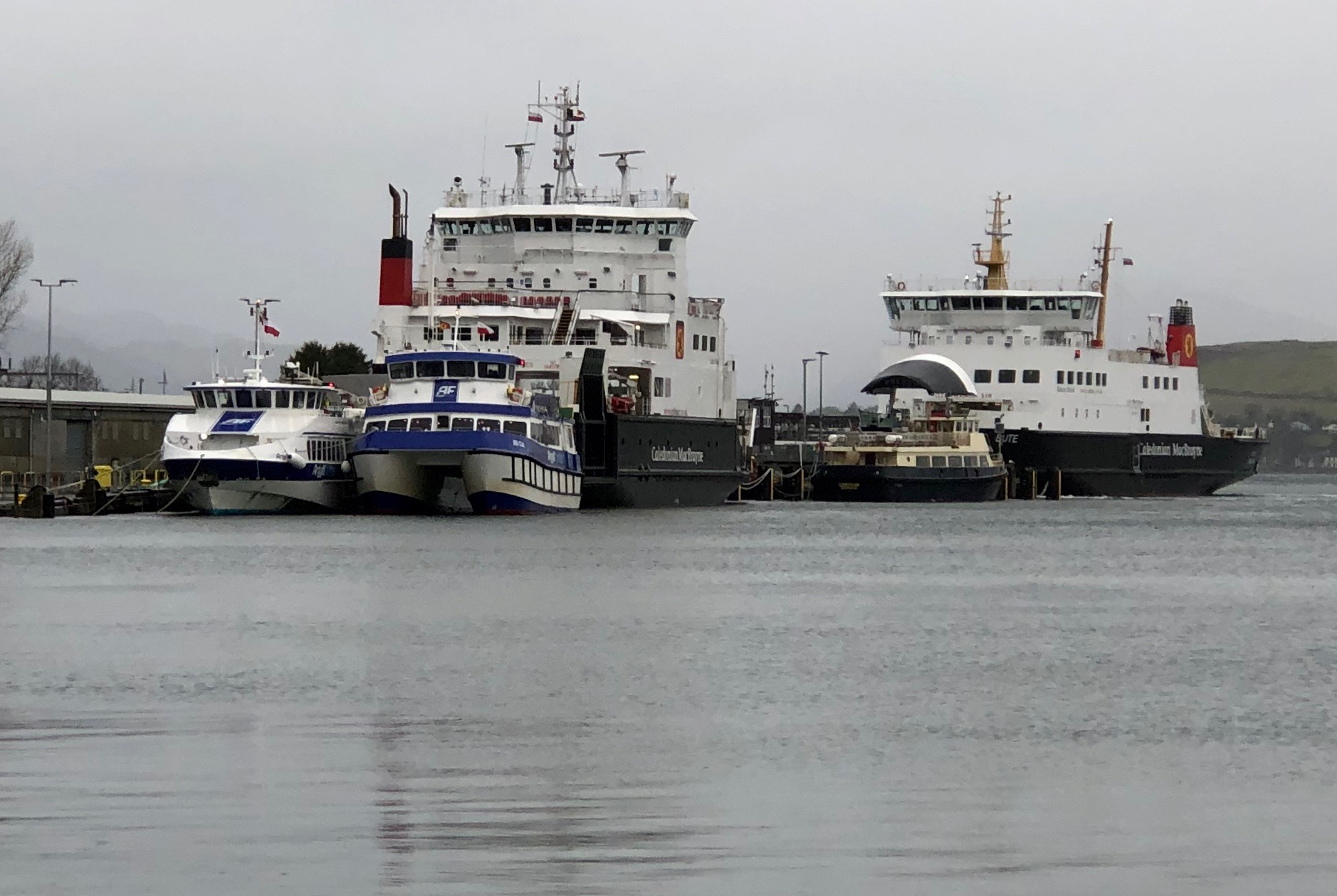
Gourock pierhead on 8 February 2019 during Storm Erik, with Argyll Flyer and Ali Cat, still in Argyll Ferries livery, tied up next to Coruisk and the Kilcreggan ferry Chieftain, while the Rothesay ferry Bute arrives after being diverted from Wemyss Bay.

The larger MacBrayne ferry MV Coruisk had already been used for peak sailings and for relief sailings when available, in December 2016 Transport Minister Humza Yousaf announced that this ferry was being redeployed to Gourock for winter sailings.

== Amalgamation ==
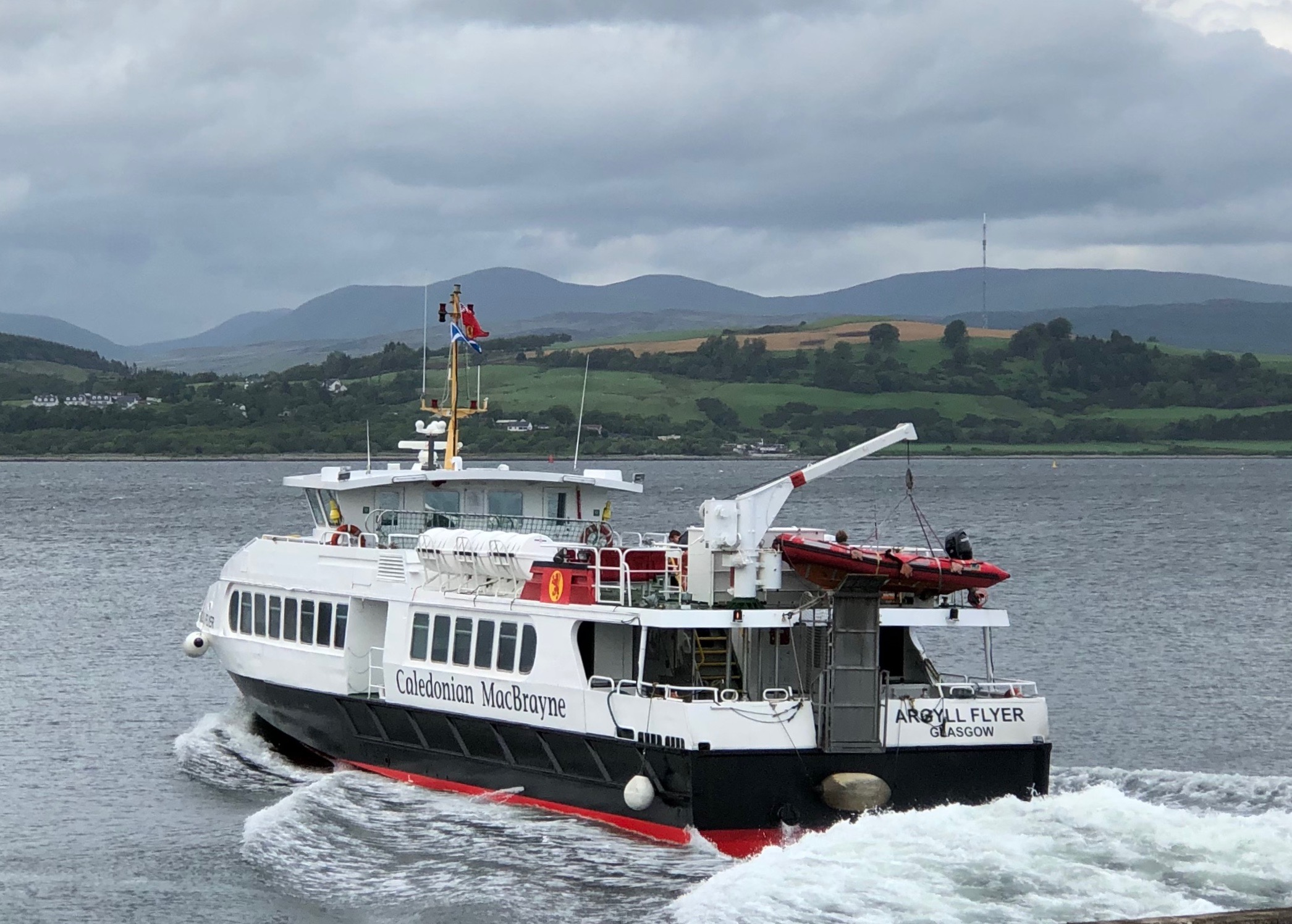
June 2019 – Argyll Flyer now in CalMac livery.

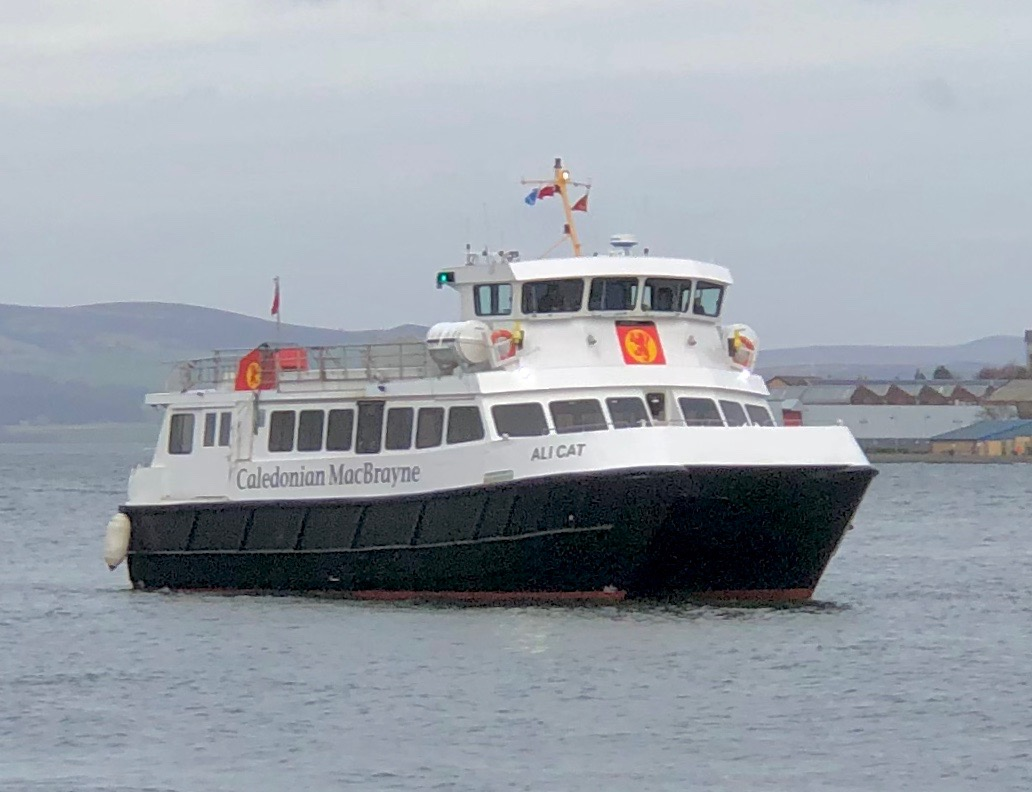
From 12 November 2019 Ali Cat was also in CalMac livery.

At the end of 2018 Transport Scotland decided to incorporate the Argyll Ferries service into the existing Caledonian MacBrayne Clyde and Hebrides Ferry Service contract, the transition took place on 21 January 2019. There would be no immediate changes to the service which was to continue with the same staff and boats, uniforms and livery of the boats would change to CalMac branding at a future date to minimise disruption. Transport Scotland stated that they would reconsider future vessel and service requirements.
