= MV Argyll Flyer =

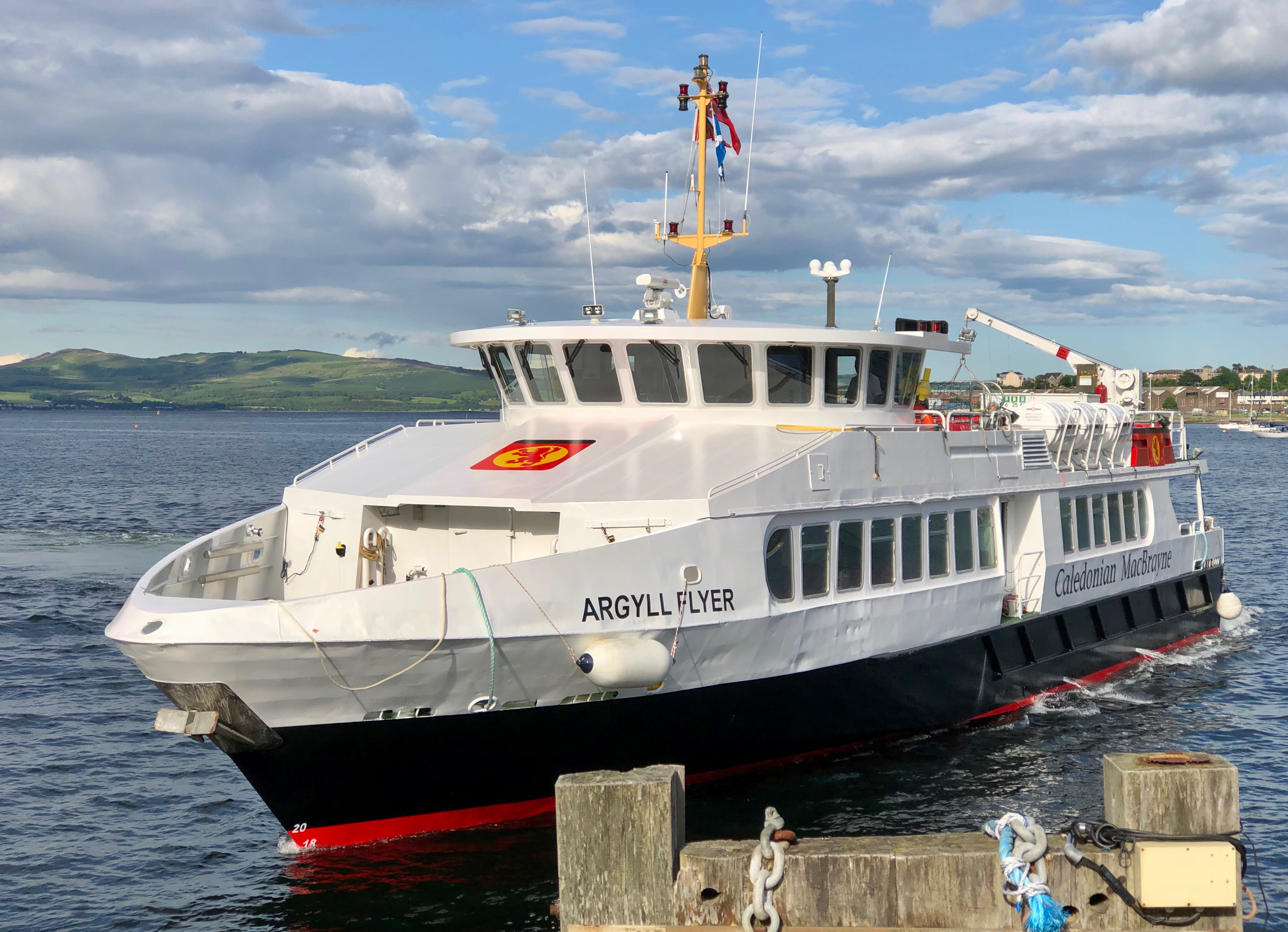
- MV Argyll Flyer arriving at Gourock, freshly painted in CalMac livery.

History

United Kingdom
- Name: MV Argyll Flyer
- Owner: Caledonian MacBrayne
- Operator: Caledonian MacBrayne
- Port of registry: Glasgow
- Route: Dunoon to Gourock
- Builder: OCEA, Les Sables-d'Olonne, France
- Completed: 2001
- Acquired: June 2011
- Identification: IMO number: 9231016; Callsign: 2ERS2; MMSI number: 235087611
- Status: in service

General characteristics
- Tonnage: 127 gt
- Length: 30 m (98 ft 5 in)
- Beam: 7 m (23 ft 0 in)
- Draft: 2.0 m (6 ft 7 in)
- Decks: 2
- Installed power: Two MTU 12V 2000 M70
- Speed: Max. 22 knots (25 mph; 41 km/h)
- Capacity: 244 passengers
- Crew: 3

MV Argyll Flyer is a passenger ferry in the Caledonian MacBrayne fleet, which along with MV Ali Cat provides a service in Scotland, across the Firth of Clyde from Dunoon to Gourock pierhead and railway station.

== History ==
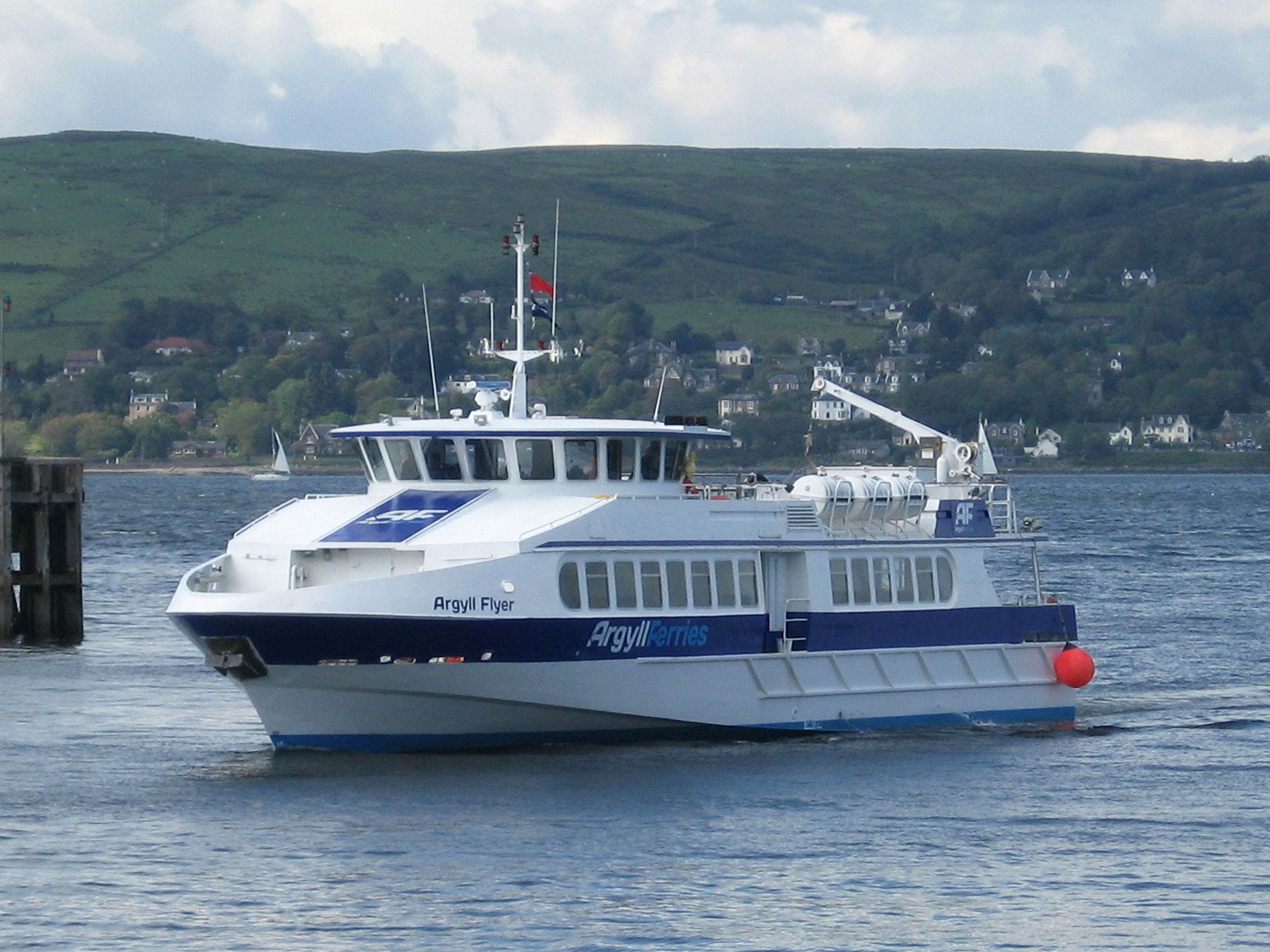
MV Argyll Flyer approaching Gourock pier in 2011, in Argyll Ferries livery.

She was constructed by OCEA, Les Sables-d'Olonne, France in 2001 for Inishmore Ferries, and under the name "Queen of Aran II" in 2004 she was sold to Aran Island Ferries following the closure of Inismore Ferries and in 2007 renamed Banríon Chonamara (Queen of Connemara) provided a service to the Aran Islands in Ireland. In May 2011 the David MacBrayne Ltd subsidiary Argyll Ferries Ltd was announced as the preferred bidder for the tender for the Dunoon–Gourock service; they bought the ferry which was renamed Argyll Flyer for the new service commencing 30 June 2011. On 15 June she arrived at the Ardmaleish boatyard on the Isle of Bute for survey work. At the end of 2018, Transport Scotland made the decision to incorporate the Argyll Ferries service into the existing Caledonian MacBrayne Clyde and Hebrides Ferry Service contract. The transition took place on 21 January 2019 without any immediate changes to the service. Argyll Flyer had her livery changed to CalMac branding in May 2019.

== Layout ==
Argyll Flyer is a monohull boat of aluminium construction. She has capacity for 244 passengers on two decks with on-board facilities including a wheelchair lift and accessible toilets. There is no booking office at Gourock Ferry Terminal; passengers pay on board.

== Service ==
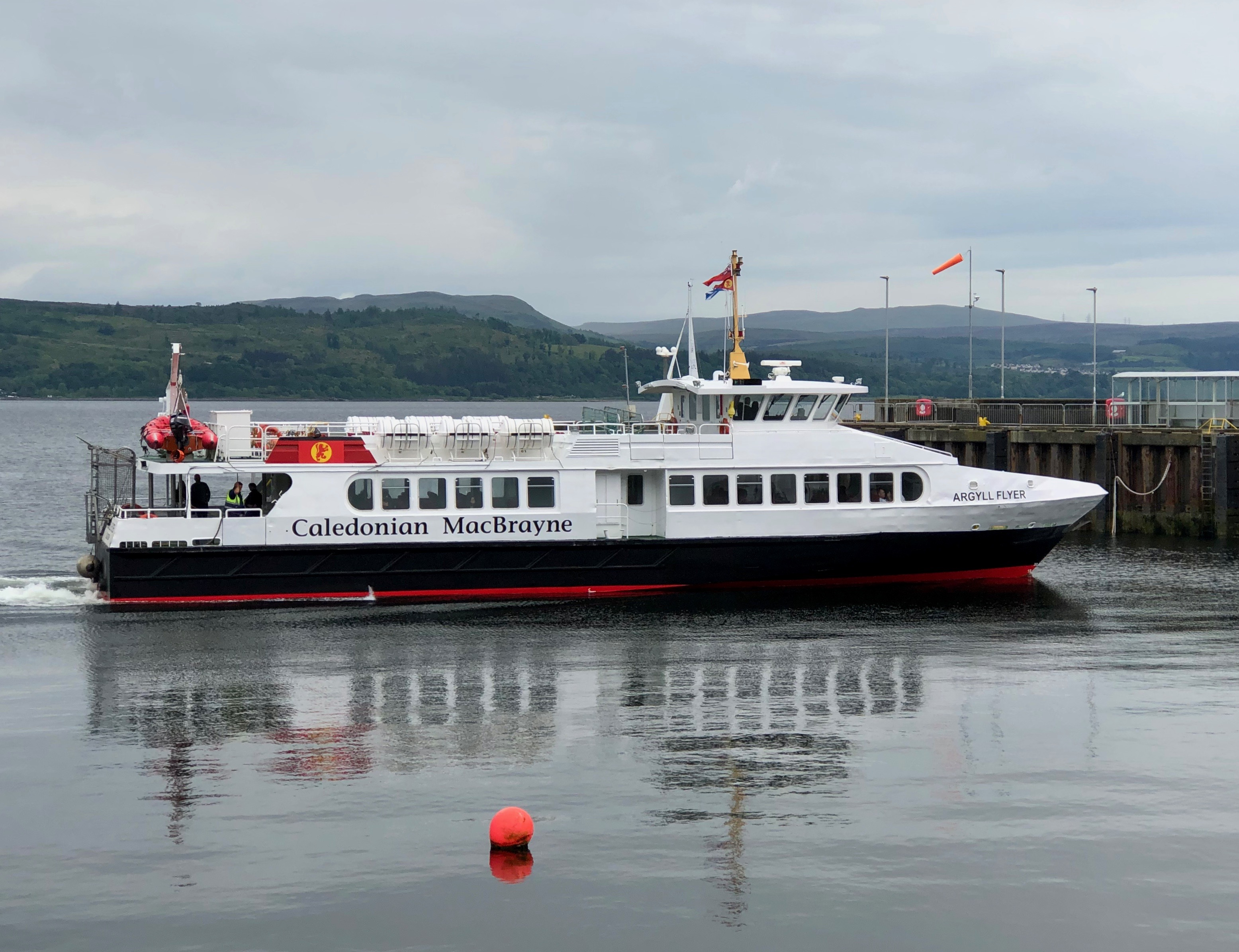
Argyll Flyer in CalMac livery, approaching Dunoon pier

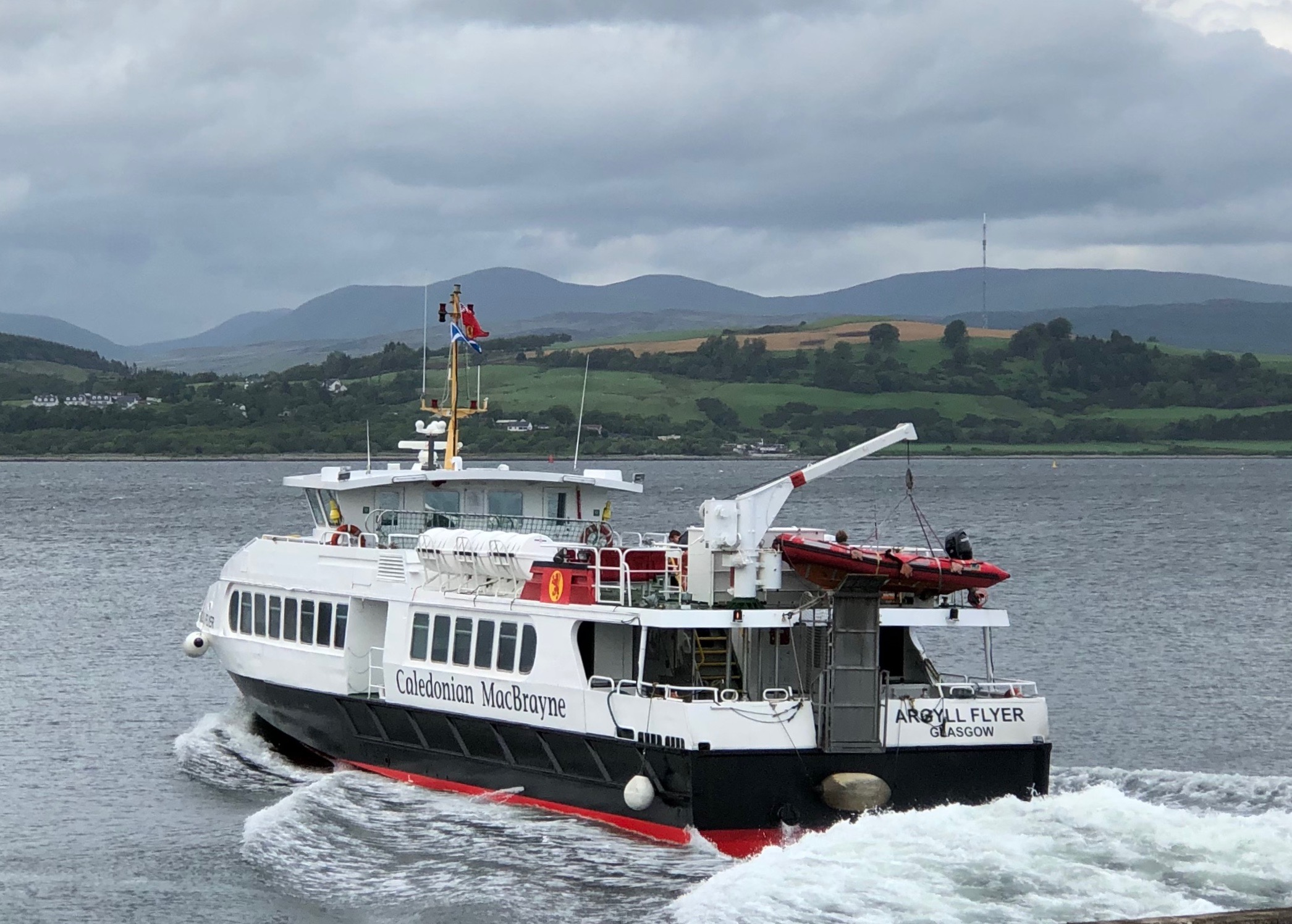
Departing Gourock for Dunoon

Argyll Flyer's entry into service was delayed by broken rear prop shafts. Once the service was in full operation, people from Dunoon were able to return later in the evening from Glasgow than previously thanks to the extended timetable. She continues to operate the route between Gourock and Dunoon, providing a direct public transport link from Dunoon town centre to Glasgow Central Station via the connection at Gourock railway station.

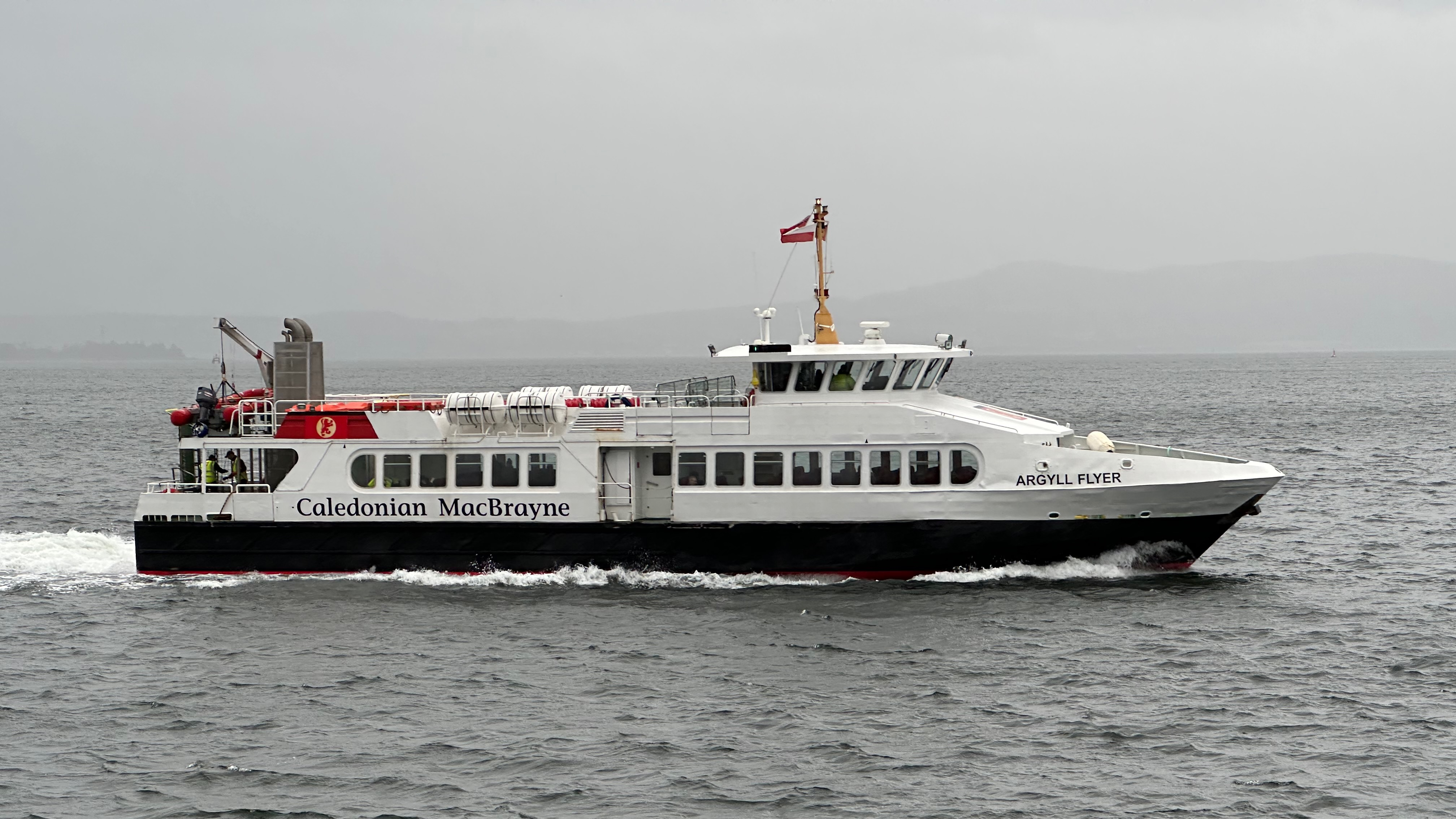
Late October 2025, extended exhaust casing

The ferry was taken out of service at the end of March 2025 after testing showed that, under certain conditions, its exhaust gas exceeded workplace safety limits. After design and approval, modifications were made extending the exhausts. Following sea trials, the ferry was back in service on 30 October 2025.
