= MV Ali Cat =

Passenger ferry on the Firth of Clyde, Scotland

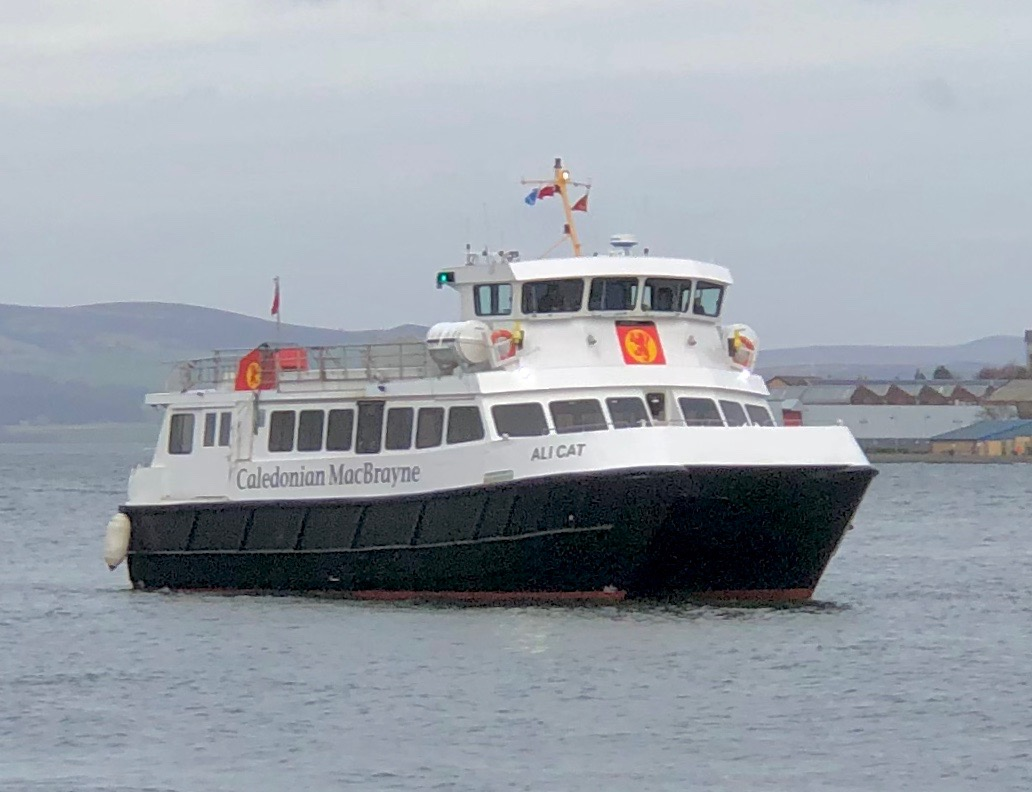
- MV Ali Cat at Gourock pierhead in February 2020

History

United Kingdom
- Name: MV Ali Cat
- Owner: Caledonian MacBrayne
- Operator: 2002 – 2011: Caledonian MacBrayne; 2011 – 2019: Argyll Ferries Ltd; 2019 – : Caledonian MacBrayne
- Port of registry: Glasgow; Scotland (since 2011), Cowes; England (1999-2011)
- Route: Dunoon to Gourock
- Builder: South Boats of East Cowes, Isle of Wight
- Completed: 1999
- Acquired: 13 October 2002
- Identification: MMSI number: 235056506
- Status: in service

General characteristics
- Tonnage: 73 GT
- Length: 19 m
- Beam: 9 m
- Draught: 1.5 m
- Installed power: Two Scania DI 14 diesels
- Propulsion: 32inch propellers
- Speed: 14 knots (26 km/h; 16 mph) max.
- Capacity: 250 passengers
- Crew: 4

MV Ali Cat is a motor catamaran passenger ferry owned and operated by Caledonian MacBrayne, which along with MV Argyll Flyer provides a service from Dunoon to Gourock across the Firth of Clyde, Scotland.

== History ==
MV Ali Cat was built in 2000 for Solent & Wightline Cruises, who chartered her to Blue Funnel Group. They in turn chartered her to Caledonian MacBrayne for the Dunoon to Gourock service. She entered service on 21 October 2002 to run at peak times, carrying up to 250 passengers. The run had previously been served at peak times by two car ferries, one of which went down the Firth of Clyde at quieter times to assist on the Rothesay to Wemyss Bay service which only had a 90-minute service at peak times. Introduction of the Ali Cat for the winter 2002-03 timetable met morning and evening commuter demand on the Dunoon run, releasing the peak period car ferry to improve the Rothesay service. At first the catamaran had occasional difficulties with winter weather making embarking at Dunoon hazardous and leading to cancellations. The service was subsequently extended to cover summer timetables, and construction of a breakwater in 2004 overcame the problems at Dunoon pier.

From 30 June 2011, the Dunoon to Gourock crossing became a passenger-only service operated by Argyll Ferries Ltd (a sister company to Caledonian MacBrayne). Ali Cat was purchased outright and continues to ply the route.

== Layout ==
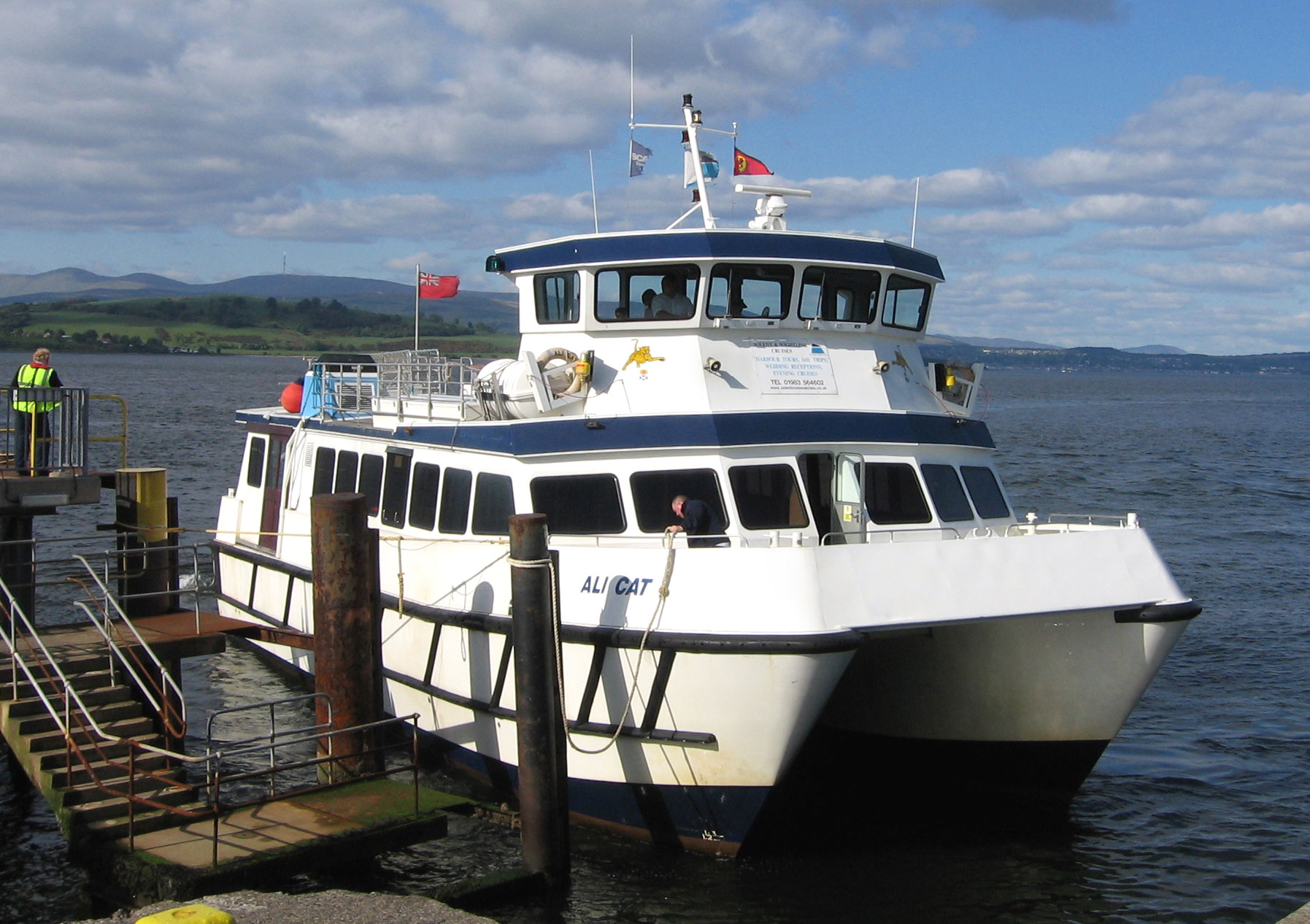
Initially, CalMac used Ali Cat to supplement car ferry services at peak periods

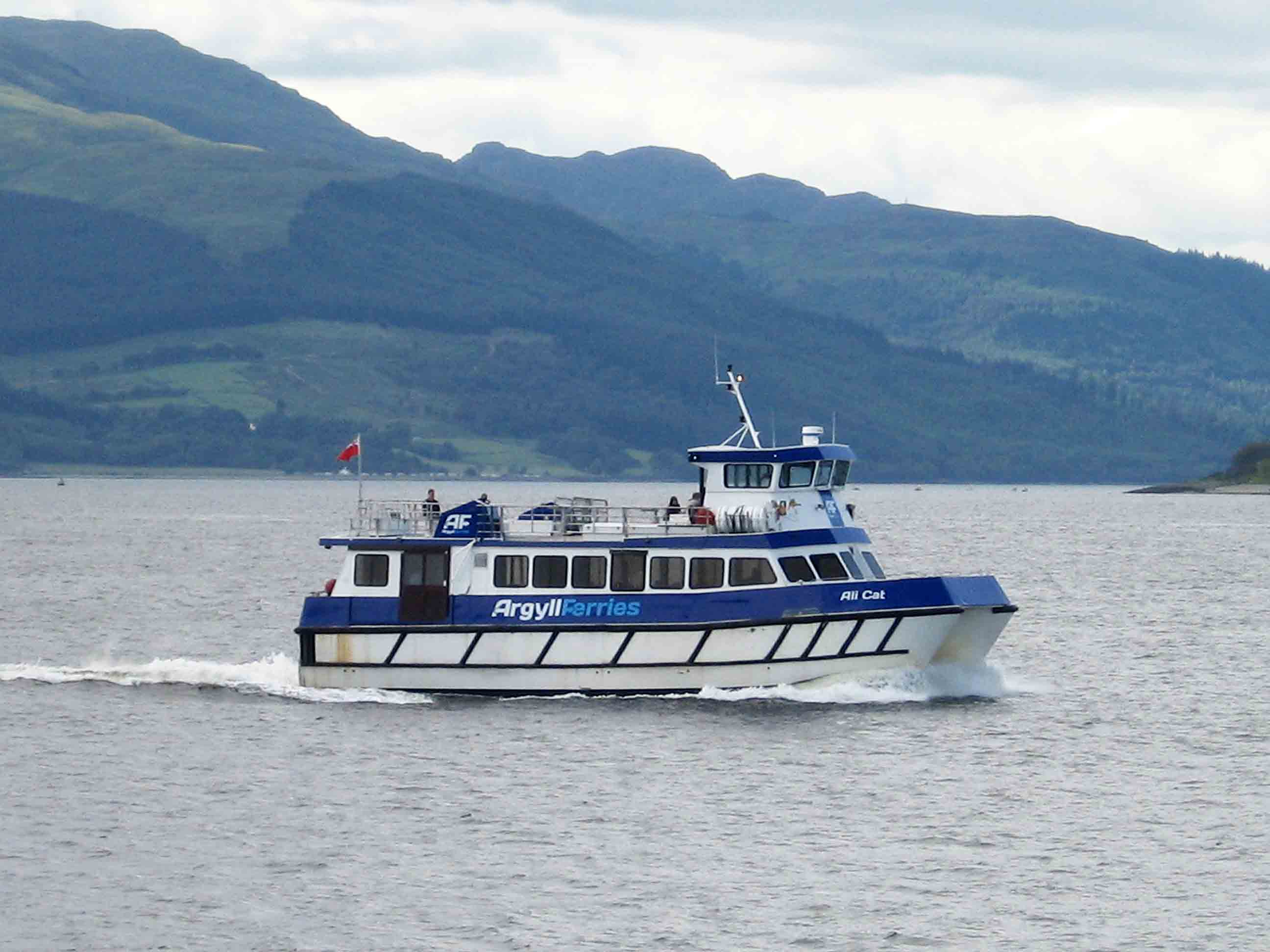
Ali Cat in Argyll Ferries Ltd livery 2011–2019.

Ali Cat is a motor catamaran. A bar serves the covered accommodation, and passengers can also use the open upper deck. She can maintain a speed of 14 knots (26 km/h; 16 mph), but the service speed is around 12 knots (22 km/h; 14 mph)

== Service ==
MV Ali Cat provides a passenger-only service between Gourock and Dunoon, initially supplementing car ferry sailings at peak periods. At special weekends in the past she has supplemented the CalMac Rothesay service.

Following the withdrawal of the Caledonian MacBrayne Gourock-Dunoon vehicle service on 29 June 2011, Ali Cat formed part of the new contract for the passenger-only service on this route, operated by Argyll Ferries Ltd and using the new pier at Dunoon. As well as being repainted in Argyll Ferries livery, a fold-down ramp was added at the stern, enabling foot passenger and wheelchair use of the linkspan vehicle ramps at both ferry terminals.

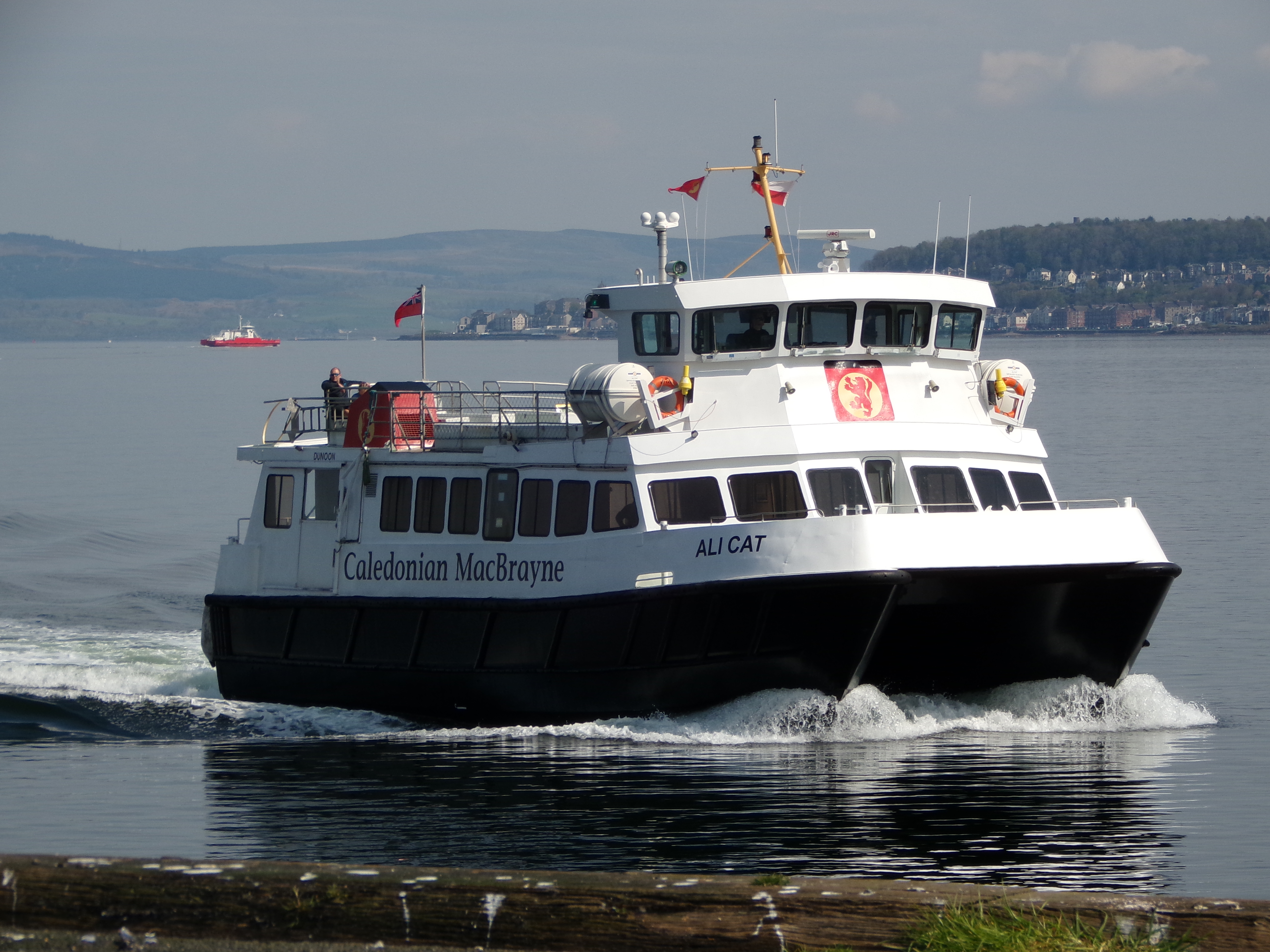
MV Ali Cat arriving in Dunoon

From 21 January 2019 the Argyll Ferries service was transferred by Transport Scotland into the existing Caledonian MacBrayne Clyde and Hebrides Ferry Service contract, on 12 November 2019 Ali Cat was seen at the James Watt Dock, repainted in CalMac livery.
