= MV Glen Sannox (2017) =

Car and passenger ferry for Caledonian MacBrayne

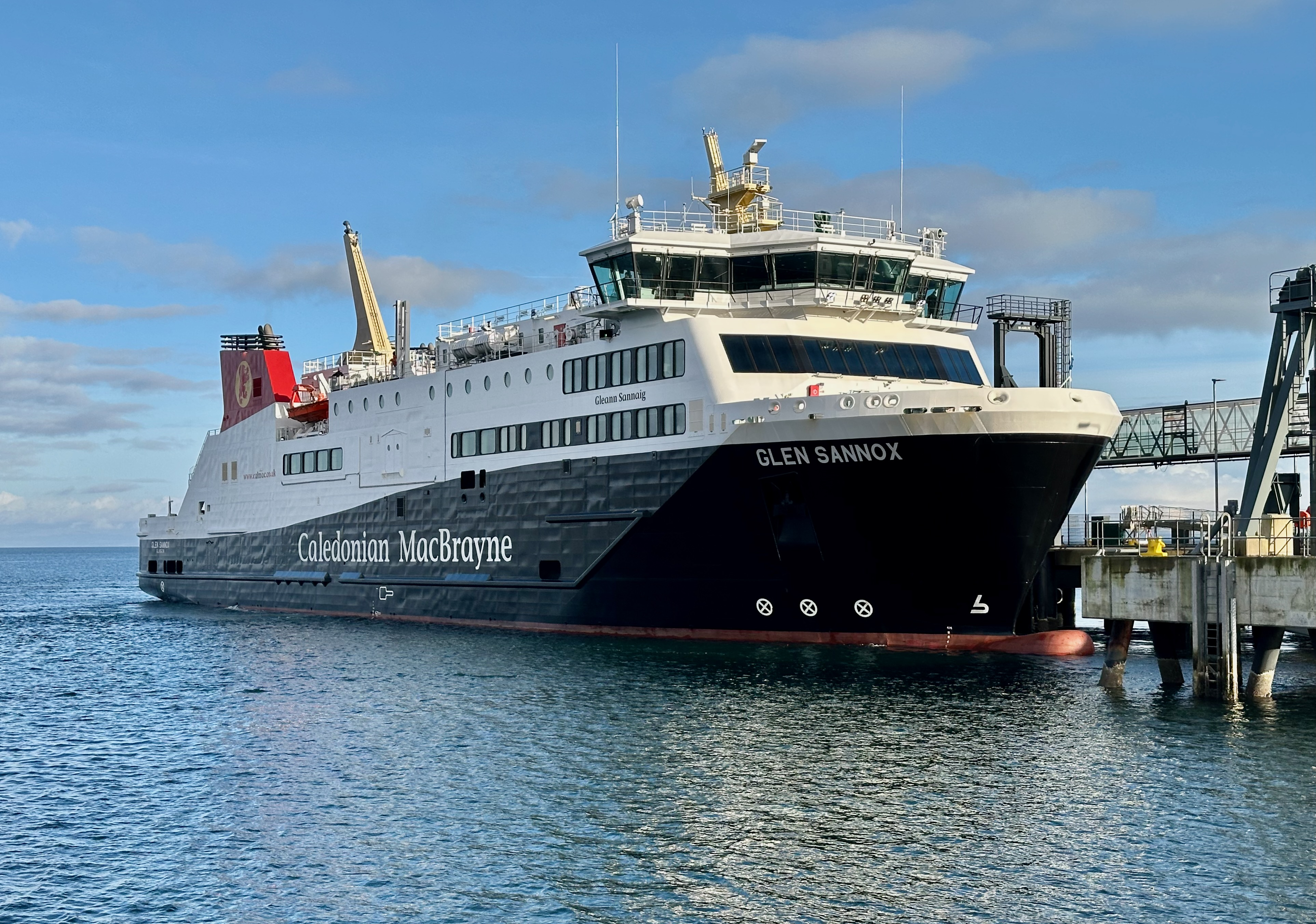
- Departing Brodick in January 2025

History

United Kingdom
- Name: MV Glen Sannox; Scottish Gaelic: Gleann Sannaig
- Namesake: MV Glen Sannox (1957) and Glen Sannox on the Isle of Arran
- Owner: Caledonian Maritime Assets
- Operator: Caledonian MacBrayne
- Port of registry: Glasgow
- Route: Relief vessel
- Ordered: 16 October 2015
- Builder: Ferguson Marine, Port Glasgow, Inverclyde, Scotland
- Cost: £97 million original contract for two ferries; £380 million as of June 2024, and £45 million loan written off.
- Yard number: 801
- Laid down: 17 February 2017
- Launched: 21 November 2017
- Christened: by Nicola Sturgeon First Minister of Scotland
- Completed: 20 November 2024
- Maiden voyage: 12 January 2025
- In service: 13 January 2025
- Identification: IMO number: 9794513
- Status: In service

General characteristics
- Tonnage: 1,273 DWT
- Length: 102.4 m (335 ft 11 in)
- Beam: 17 m (55 ft 9 in)
- Draught: 3.4 m (11 ft 2 in)
- Installed power: 2 × Wärtsilä 34DF diesels
- Propulsion: 2 × Controllable pitch propellers; 3 × Bow thrusters
- Speed: 14.5 kn (26.85 km/h) / 16.5 kn (30.56 km/h)
- Capacity: 1,000 passengers, 127 cars or 16 HGVs (planned); 852 passengers (actual)

MV Glen Sannox is a car and passenger ferry constructed at Ferguson Marine in Port Glasgow for the Scottish Government asset company CMAL, to lease to its ferry operator Caledonian MacBrayne. Entering service informally to the Isle of Arran on 12 January 2025, formally on 13 January 2025, she is the first of two dual-fuel CalMac ferries, capable of operating on either marine gas oil, or LNG which offers a marked reduction in sulphur dioxide, nitrous oxide and carbon dioxide emissions, the other being the MV Glen Rosa. The ship's name recalls an earlier Arran ferry.

The ship's sea trials began in February 2024, and she was moved to Inchgreen Quay in Greenock, freeing the Newark Quay at the shipyard for the launch of MV Glen Rosa. After difficulties in completing the LNG power system, there were further delays. Filling the LNG tank (bunkering) was completed by 18 September, and sea trials using LNG began on 20 September. Manufacturer's sea trials were successfully completed on 23 October.

On 19 November 2024, Ferguson Marine announced that the vessel had passed its final certification checks and been issued with a passenger certificate. The ship was handed over to CMAL on 21 November. Following crew familiarisation trials by CalMac, the ship entered revenue-earning service on the Troon to Brodick route on 12 January 2025, and her first voyage in timetabled operation was on 13 January.

== History ==
The state-owned enterprise CalMac, originally Caledonian MacBrayne Ltd, was formed in 1973 as a vessel owner and operator providing most of the ferry services to the Firth of Clyde and the Hebridean islands off the west coast of Scotland. In 2006, its roles were split to satisfy EU competition rules. As Caledonian Maritime Assets (CMAL) it continued to own the Caledonian MacBrayne fleet and order new ships, while CalMac Ferries Ltd (CalMac) was created as a separate company which successfully bid in open competitive tender for the contract to operate the services.

Many of CalMac's ferries were built by Ferguson Shipbuilders, which employed over 300 people in 2000, but it had struggled to compete and orders from the Scottish Executive were won by the Remontowa shipyard in Gdańsk, Poland. In 2011 Ferguson Shipbuilders successfully bid for two small hybrid ferries for CMAL, funded by the Scottish Government's Low Emissions Hybrid Ferries project.

=== Ferries plan ===
The Scottish Government's Ferries Plan, which its executive agency Transport Scotland published in December 2012, included indicative proposals for two new major vessels. International emissions regulations tightened, and cleaner liquefied natural gas (LNG) fuel was adopted by ferry operators in Northern Europe, particularly Norway. The Danish island of Samsø invited tenders for the first in the EU, and in June 2013 Remontowa was awarded the contract for this dual-fuel ferry, to be delivered in October 2014. David MacBrayne Ltd bid to operate a ferry connecting Gotland in Sweden, with detailed proposals drawn up by CalMac, but in May 2014 this bid was reported unsuccessful.

To prepare the Vessel Replacement and Deployment Plan (VRDP), Transport Scotland held tripartite monthly meetings with CMAL and CalMac, starting in October 2013. By agreement, CalMac led development of programmes for the vessels. This included two new major ferries, one to be deployed on services between Uig – Tarbert / Lochmaddy, the other on services between Ardrossan – Brodick / Campbeltown. These vessels would ideally be of similar capacity to MV Loch Seaforth, and likely be LNG dual-fuel powered. In early July 2014 the Scottish Government, using CalMac's initial analytical work, authorised the procurement of these two new major ferries, aiming to name the preferred bidder in nine months. CMAL's head of vessels said then that this timetable was a "hugely challenging". It left CalMac only three weeks to produce its Specification of Technical and Operational Requirements. They quickly adapted work done for the Gotland ferry bid, but made some errors such as including irrelevant description of passenger cabins. The exceptionally large and detailed specification now had to be made more concise as part of CMAL's tender documents.

=== Rescue of Fergusons ===
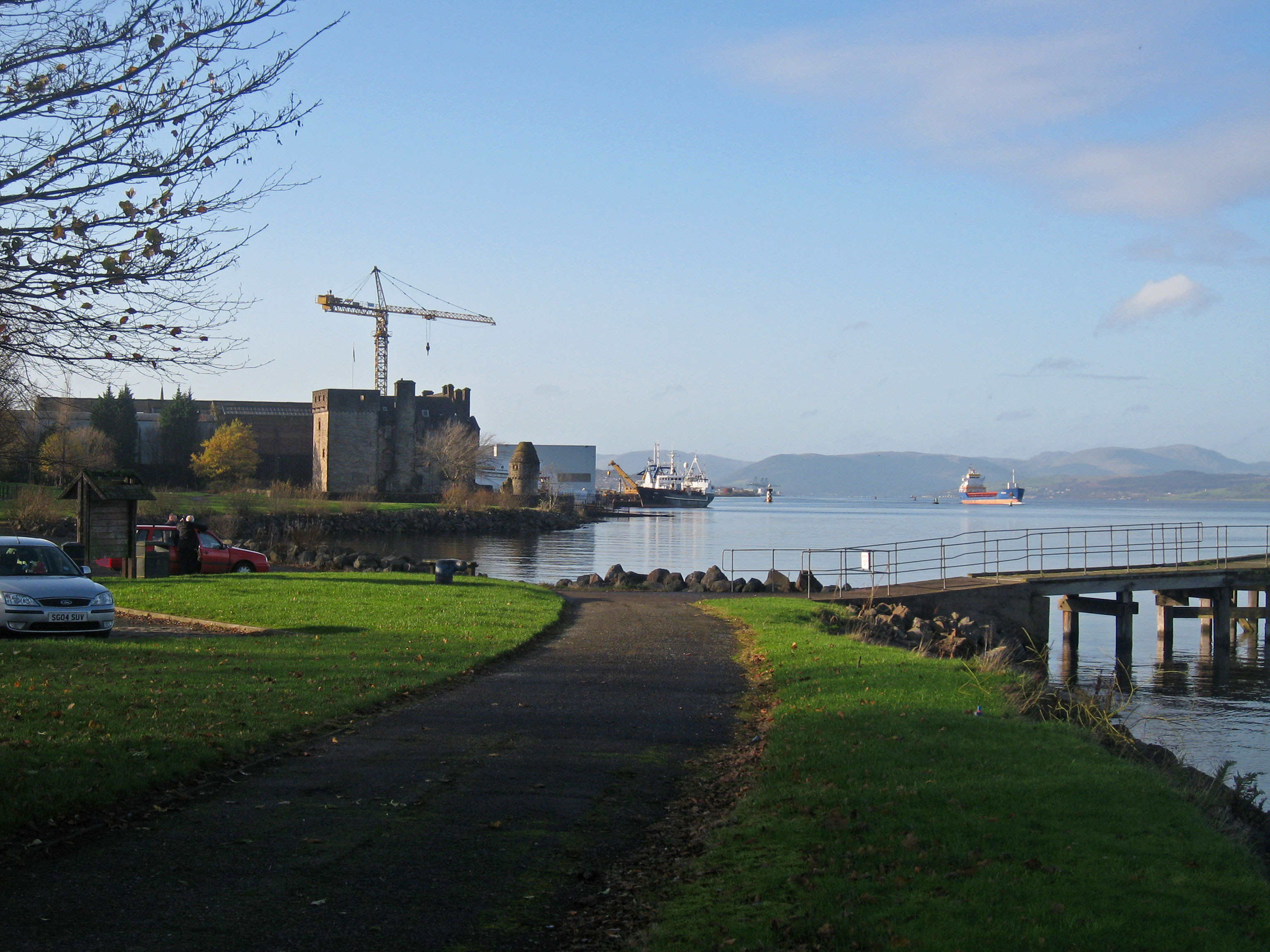
Ferguson Shipbuilders in 2011, adjacent to Newark Castle, seen across parkland on the former Lamont's shipyard site

Ferguson Shipbuilders had been struggling to get orders. Cash flow problems, and difficulties in arranging financial bonds (or refund guarantees) left it unable to bid for several major contracts. The workforce was reduced to 77, then on 15 August 2014, a month before the Scottish independence referendum, the yard went bankrupt, and the administrators KPMG immediately laid off 70 workers. The First Minister of Scotland, Alex Salmond of the SNP, personally intervened and persuaded businessman Jim McColl, one of his Council of Economic Advisers, to buy out the shipyard. McColl's Clyde Blowers Capital, previously deterred by the yard's debts, now took over its assets and business, and formed Ferguson Marine Engineering Ltd. (FMEL) as a new subsidiary. On 30 September Deputy First Minister Nicola Sturgeon announced that FMEL had been given the order for a third hybrid ferry, MV Catriona. Government ministers had given CMAL a letter of comfort allowing this contract to go ahead without a refund guarantee.

CMAL's draft specification was disputed by CalMac, who said on 14 October that it only met 20% of their requirements. The compromise eventually specified in the tender documents meant wider ships which would need improvements to ports.

== Construction ==
=== Vessel procurement and bidding ===
The start of the vessel procurement process was publicly announced on 15 October 2014 by the Transport Minister Keith Brown. The pre-qualifying questionnaire (PQQ), issued by CMAL on 17 October, invited shipbuilders to demonstrate their capability for detailed design, construction, testing, and delivery of two 100 metres long ROPAX ferries. The questionnaire emphasised the requirement for Bank Refund Guarantee bonds before work started, and requested evidence from a bank confirming its willingness to provide these guarantees. Following discussion with CMAL, FMEL said on 9 December that guarantees from its parent company Clyde Blowers Capital (CBC) would be inappropriate, so it intended to provide Bank Guarantees and would "endeavour to provide Guarantees to levels that provide the security you require."

Of the six shipbuilders shortlisted for the invitation to tender (ITT), only Remontowa was experienced in building dual-fuel LNG engined ships. They had won the contract for the dual fuel Samsø ferry in 2013, and delivered it in February 2015.

The ITT, issued on 10 December 2014, included a 135-page technical schedule, mostly derived from a much longer "Specification of Operational and Technical Requirements" (SoTR) for the vessels drawn up by CalMac. It said they were to be dual-fuel LNG engined. Under the industry standard BIMCO design and build New Build Contract, shipyards bid a fixed price to take responsibility for designing and building ships to meet the specification, and the full risk for this remains with the builder throughout the construction period. Bidders were required to accept the terms of the draft contract included with the ITT, or provide comments and/or propose amendments to this draft.

The ITT required refund guarantees on behalf of the Builder by "a first class international bank". FMEL wrote that they had no comment to make "at this time". When FMEL told local MSP Stuart McMillan that they could not provide these guarantees, he wrote to the deputy first minister John Swinney. In early February 2015 transport minister Derek Mackay responded; "While CMAL's board in line with standard industry practice has a preference for refund guarantees it has on occasion taken alternative approaches to ensure that ship yards, including Ferguson under its previous owners, were not excluded from bidding for those government contracts." This letter was taken by McColl as suggesting that "alternative approaches were acceptable. On this basis FMEL proceeded with the tender." CMAL say they had "no awareness of, or involvement in, these exchanges."

=== Shortlisted tenders ===
Tenders were submitted by 31 March 2015, then evaluated on cost and quality by CMAL with assistance of a consultant naval architect. CalMac gave technical input. The FMEL design was heavy, with large engines, and the two ship contracts totalled £109.8M. Their bid briefly mentioned a lighter design they had developed in the "initial stages" of the project before going on to develop the heavier ship in order to give greater "comfort" on their ability to meet the deadweight (cargo capacity) requirement. On 17 May CMAL's evaluators asked for more details of this earlier design, enabling FMEL to price each ship contract at £50.25M, eventually negotiated down to £48.5M each, a total of £97M.

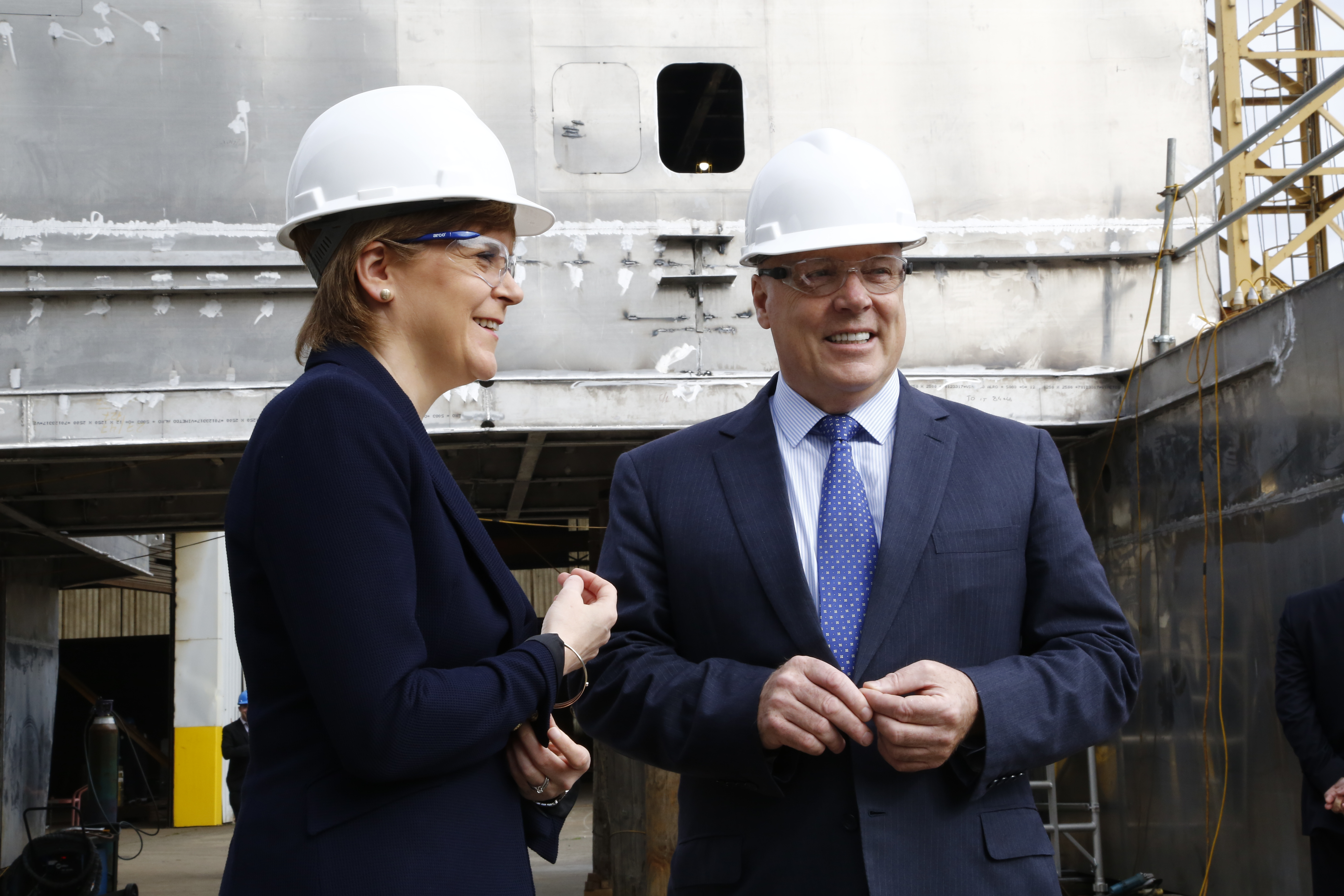
First Minister Nicola Sturgeon met Jim McColl at the shipyard on 31 August 2015, and announced that FMEL was the preferred bidder.

The assessment placed the Remontowa bid second, FMEL's was "the highest quality bid received but also the highest price. Taken together, the FMEL tender achieved the highest overall evaluation score". On 20 August 2015 the Transport Scotland Ferries Unit wrote asking the transport minister to approve in principle award of the contracts by CMAL before the tenders expired on 31 August. Transport Scotland (TS) told CMAL on 21 August that FMEL would be named as preferred bidder at the end of the month. Also on 21 August, FMEL's lawyers said that refund guarantees could not be arranged by CBC, and instead proposed guarantees from its subsidiary, the holding company Ferguson Marine Engineering (Holdings) Limited, but CMAL required independent refund guarantees as specified. Negotiations were far from concluded, and CMAL told TS that announcing the preferred bidder would "materially reduce their negotiating hand"; TS offered CMAL a letter of comfort if needed. On 31 August 2015, First Minister Nicola Sturgeon visited the shipyard and named FMEL as preferred tenderer for the £97m contract, MacKay said it was for dual-fuel ferries, "allowing them to use cleaner fuel and future-proofing them for the advent of tighter regulations around sulphur emissions." Erik Østergaard, Chair of CMAL, said "Subject to agreement on all points, we hope to be in a position to finalise the award of the contract later in September."

=== Role of CMAL ===
CMAL understood that government ministers wanted the ferries built in Scotland by FMEL, but on 25 September the CMAL board considered there were "too many risks involved around the refund guarantee matter which are still to be resolved and to that end the Board are not in a position to award the contract to FMEL at this stage." Next day, Østergaard emailed TS that CMAL could not recommend the level of unsecured risk, and proposed rejecting the deal; putting the project on hold, or "re-opening the contract negotiations with Remontowa (with whom we have a track record of doing business) or even a second yard in parallel while continuing negotiations with FMEL." Initially FMEL proposed an unusually small final milestone instalment, reducing their incentive to complete, but on 29 September they increased it to 25%, which with insurance backed guarantee coverage at 25% left CMAL at risk for around half of payments made pre-delivery. CMAL produced a paper setting out the risks. On 9 October TS confirmed that Scottish ministers had noted and accepted the risks and, as CMAL's sole shareholder, approved award of the contracts. Ministers approved £10.6m loan funding to CMAL, with special provisions to protect against the risks and repayments only due after completed ferries were in service. MacKay and Swinney signed off on the contract, and on 16 October contracts were signed between CMAL and FMEL, which MacKay publicly announced that day at the SNP's annual conference in Aberdeen.

In its 2022 report, Audit Scotland said the Builder’s Refund Guarantee (BRG) is "an integral part of shipbuilding contract and is the main source of financial security for a ship buyer", giving the shipbuilder "a significant incentive to build a quality product as the buyer can cancel the contract and claim a full refund of all payments if the ship does not meet its required specification." The contract "places full responsibility and risk for the design and build of the vessels with the shipbuilder and does not allow the buyer to intervene in the running of the project." The lack of a full refund guarantee transferred some of the risk from FMEL to CMAL, so "the contract was not effective when problems emerged."

=== Appointment of Ferguson Marine ===
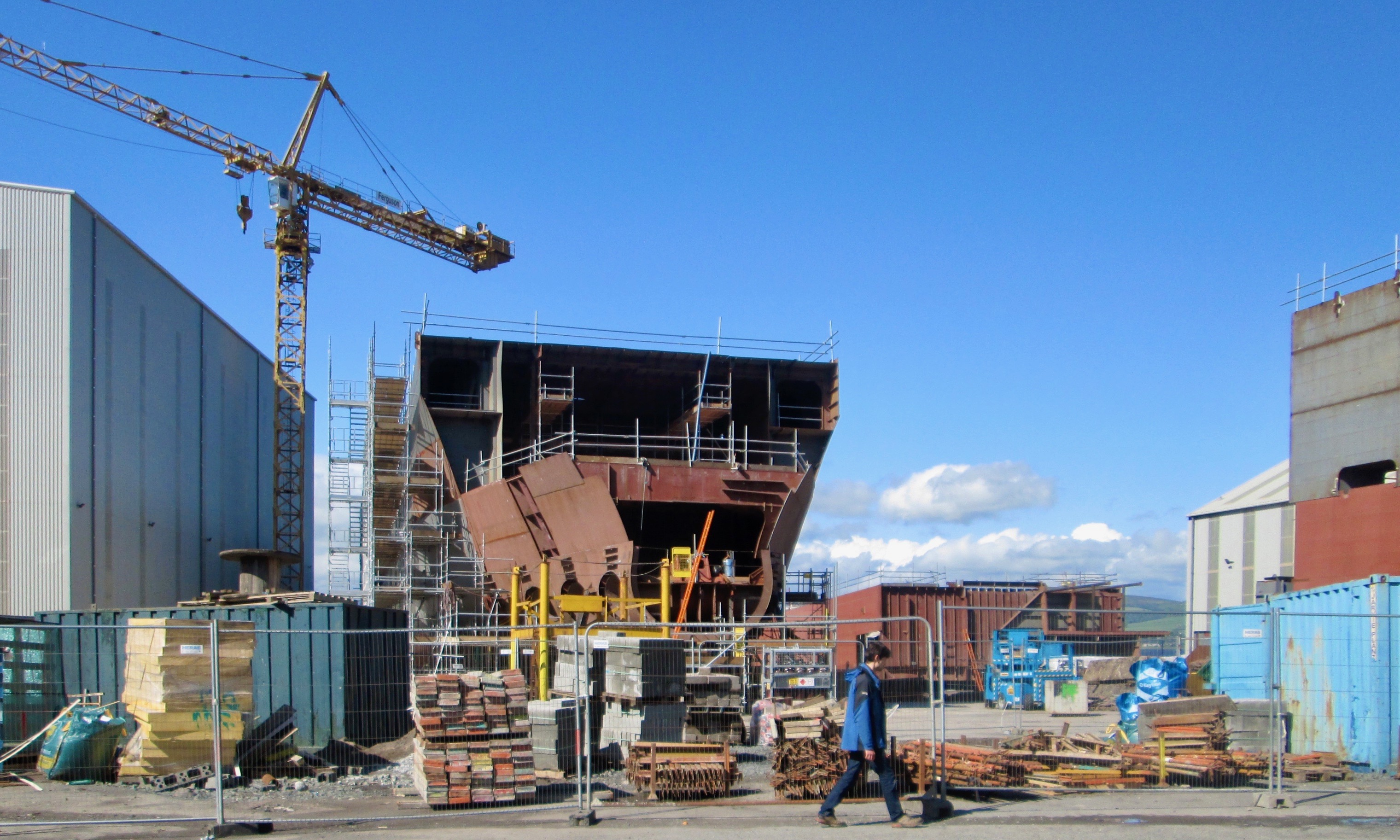
In the constricted workspace, FMEL tried to build Glen Sannox at the same time as Hull 802 (in two sections).

The build strategy of Ferguson Marine Engineering Ltd. (FMEL) was to construct vessels 801 (Glen Sannox) and 802 (Glen Rosa) concurrently until they were ready for launch, then complete work on 801 (for May 2018 delivery) before focussing on 802 (for July 2018 delivery). Their dates programme and schedule for payments, initially drafted on 21 August 2015, included 15 milestone events and payments for each vessel to aid their cash flow, rather than the usual five or six. CMAL agreed to this. The contract, signed on 16 October 2015, required the shipbuilder to provide CMAL with detailed drawings and plans 30 days before construction started, and FMEL’s project plan allowed three months to design the relevant hull section, but the agreed milestone schedule had 15 December 2015 as the start of cutting steel. Around then, CMAL informed TS of delays by FMEL in organising work. Catriona occupied the slipway until its launch on 11 December. A workshop bay was demolished, and the old brick office building was demolished before work on the new large prefabrication shed from May to August 2016. New offices were then built nearer the main road. CMAL reported that this redevelopment reduced the available space and hampered concurrent work on both vessels, but FMEL later attributed the delays to CMAL.

To mark the start of construction, the first steel for both vessels was cut on 16 February 2016 at a ceremony attended by transport minister Derek Mackay. FMEL agreed a contract in May 2016 with Vera Navis of Portugal as their detail design partner, to carry out production engineering of the ships. Problems increased as FMEL did construction work "at risk", without approval of drawings by CMAL, and without regulation approvals required by the classification society (Lloyd's Register) and the Flag Authority (MCA). Delays built up as incorrect work had to be re-done. TS informed Scottish ministers that the vessels were likely to be late, CMAL said it had cash flow problems due to contract problems and was assisted by accelerated payments and a loan. The vessel's bulbous bow was rough rather than smooth, and condemned by Lloyd's as not fit for purpose, but left uncorrected at the time of the launch.

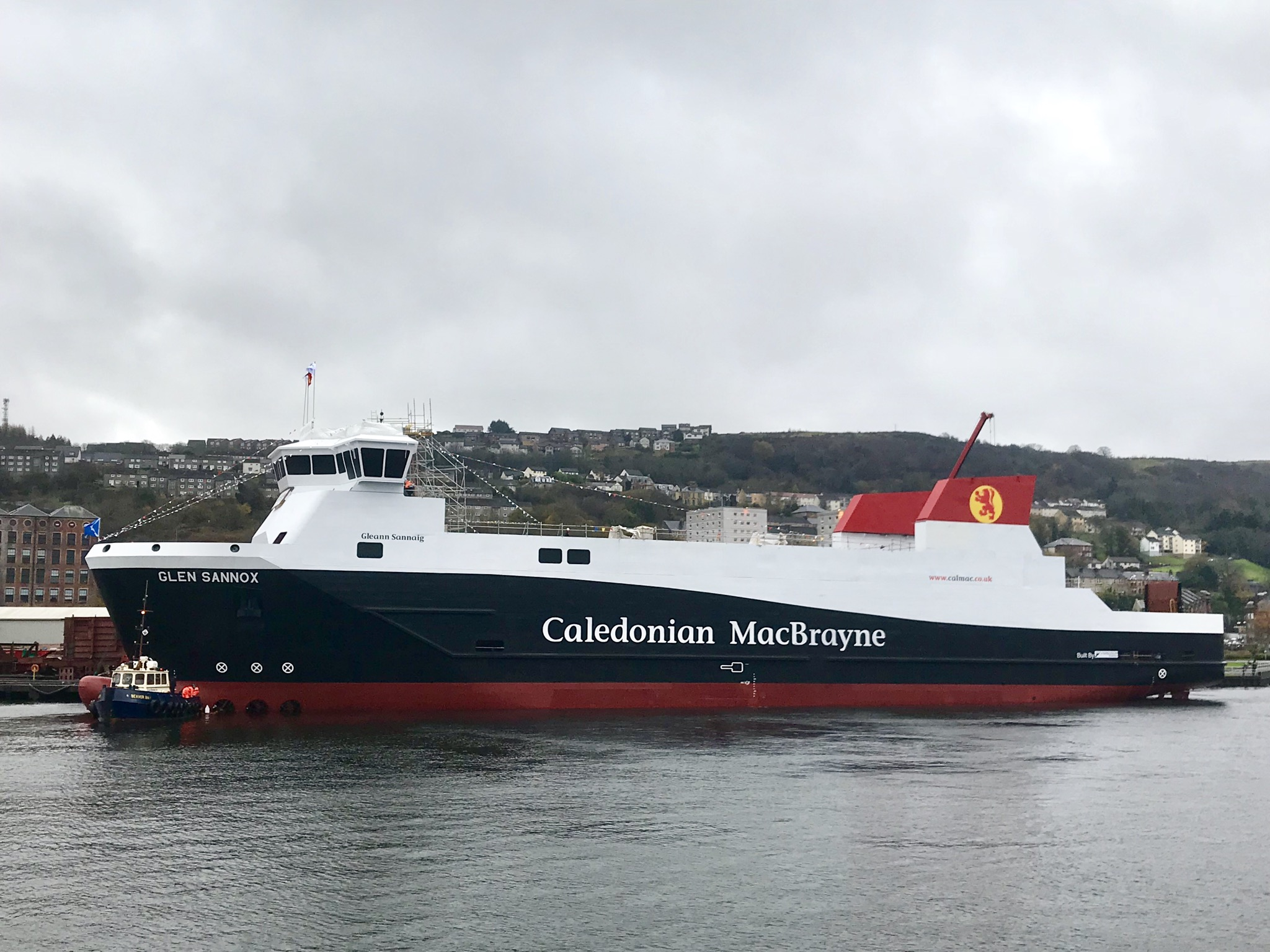
At Newark Quay just after her launch, the ship had dummy funnels, decks 6 (passenger lounges and crew accommodation) and 7 (master's office, officers cabins) were not yet built, windows were painted on, and the rejected bulbous bow had yet to be replaced.

Glen Sannox was launched on 21 November 2017 by the then First Minister Nicola Sturgeon, but was substantially incomplete at the time. The bridge (and other) windows were painted on, and the funnels were not operational, but only for show for the launch.

=== Initial delivery date ===
FMEL scheduled a May 2018 delivery date, but delayed providing CMAL with detailed drawings and plans before starting construction, causing delays when work had to be redone. In July 2017, FMEL said they were not responsible, claiming £17.5 million for additional costs, CMAL argued that the claim was not valid, but the amount claimed was increased. In August 2018, new Cabinet Secretary for Transport Michael Matheson said it had been confirmed that the ship was to be delivered in June 2019, followed by two months of crew familiarisation and sea trials. CMAL took legal advice, and completely rejected the claim in March 2019, but FMEL did not contest this in court. The Scottish Government commissioned an independent view in May 2019, and concluded in June 2019 that there was no legal basis for CMAL to pay more than the £97 million fixed price for the contract. In August 2019, FMEL went into administration. By then, FMEL had been paid £83.25 million in contract payments, and £45 million in loan payments from the Scottish Government.

=== Issues at Ferguson Marine ===
On 16 August 2019 Derek Mackay, now the finance and economy secretary, announced a nationalisation plan to take the shipyard into public ownership. A commercial transaction nationalising the shipyard was completed on 2 December 2019, making it a new business named Ferguson Marine (Port Glasgow) Ltd., with marine engineer Tim Hair appointed as turnaround director.

A report issued on 9 December 2019 estimated that, with good progress, Glen Sannox would be handed over to Caledonian Maritime Assets Ltd (CMAL) in the last quarter of 2021, and that completing the two ferries was likely to increase the total cost to over £207 million. In April 2020, Ferguson Marine (FMPG) contracted with International Contract Engineering, a marine design consultant, to revise the design and outfitting of Glen Sannox in advance of her eventual delivery. During the COVID-19 lockdown in 2020, the shipyard was closed or subject to restricted working for almost six months.

==== Dry dock ====
On 10 August 2020, tugs moved Glen Sannox to the Garvel dry dock in Greenock for remedial work including replacement of the bulbous bow, paintwork repair and removal of marine growth. After additional work, the ship returned to the Ferguson Marine shipyard in Port Glasgow on 9 September 2020.

==== Fuel system ====
In October 2022, FMPG announced that Glen Sannox would initially operate only on marine gas oil, as vacuum sensors required for the LNG system were not available.

==== Additional delays ====
Further delays to both ferries and increasing costs of £250 million, subsequently rising to £340 million by September 2022, have resulted in controversy surrounding the contract and the lack of transparency in the decision-making process. The Scottish Government announced that key documents relating to the decision-making process had gone missing.

In September 2023, a failed safety audit meant that MV Glen Sannox was further delayed: among other issues, the Maritime and Coastguard Agency (MCA) insisted on the installation of additional staircases as a condition of approving a safety audit. The work meant that planned sea trials of the Glen Sannox were delayed until the first quarter of 2024, raising doubts over whether the ship will be available for the start of the 2024 summer season. Meeting MCA safety regulations ultimately meant that the passenger capacity of both ferries had to be cut from a planned 1,000 to 852.

==== Sea trials ====
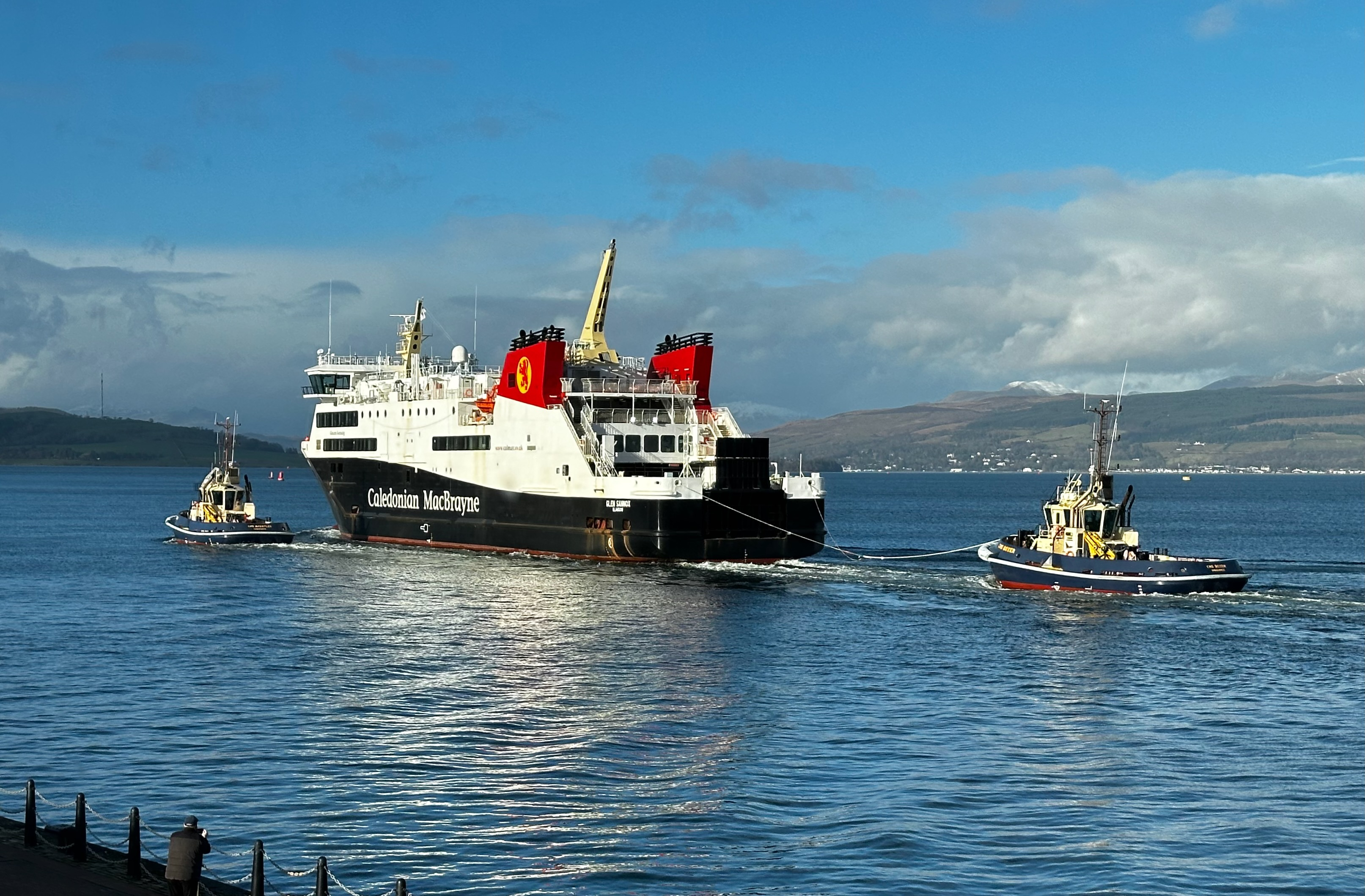
Passing Greenock when starting sea trials, 13 February 2024

The ship began manufacturer's sea trials on 13 February 2024, travelling down the Firth of Clyde as far as the Isle of Bute. It performed well, and returned to Ferguson Marine's Newark Quay for further outfitting and LNG system work, before work at Garvel dry dock, then moved to Inchgreen Quay in Greenock, leaving Newark Quay free for the launch of MV Glen Rosa on 9 April 2024.

In June 2024 a delivery date of 19 August 2024 was announced, but there were later delays. On 18 July the Deputy First Minister of Scotland, Kate Forbes, visited the shipyard to announce plans for Ferguson Marine, and was shown round Glen Sannox at Inchgreen Quay.

In November, Lloyd's Register and the MCA issued regulatory certificates confirming that the ship met all their requirements. The final documentation was signed, then next day the vessel was formally handed over to CMAL on 21 November 2024. Success of crew familiarisation trials by CalMac was announced on 20 December, with the ship beginning its first sailing on 12 January 2025, from Troon to Brodick and return, preceding the beginning of the full timetabled service on 13 January 2025.

== LNG and port infrastructure ==
Liquefied natural gas (LNG) is significantly cleaner than marine diesel oil, and the 2014 Vessel Replacement and Deployment Plan (VRDP) noted ferries in Northern Europe using LNG to meet imminent international rules (IMO 2020) requiring a drastic reduction in sulphur oxide emissions. Options were using expensive low sulphur marine gas oil (MGO), fitting "scrubbers" to engine exhausts, or using LNG which has hardly any sulphur, and greatly reduces nitrous oxide pollution. CalMac met the rules by using low sulphur MGO for its fleet. Though LNG is usually a fossil fuel, it has been seen as a "transition fuel" with lower CO_{2} emissions than MGO, depending on circumstances. An October 2015 visit to Denmark confirmed it needed infrastructure for fast bunkering (refuelling), to be developed along with other port improvements. A LNG road tanker takes over two hours to transfer 20 tonnes to a ship, compared to about 45 minutes for a tanker full of MGO, but can readily top up a quayside LNG bunkering facility which takes between 45 and 60 minutes to refuel the ship.

The VRDP proposed new vessels, of similar capacity to the large MV Loch Seaforth, for Ardrossan-Brodick and the Uig route. It anticipated major development work being required at Ardrossan Harbour, owned by Clydeport (Peel Ports Group). On 15 October 2014, Transport Minister Keith Brown announced the start of the vessel procurement process. Dialogue with Peel Ports had commenced, it was "the intention that the vessels will fit existing facilities so no major work is expected." A taskforce was set up in February 2016 at a meeting chaired by Minister for Transport and Islands Derek Mackay, with representatives from Transport Scotland, Peel Ports, CMAL, CalMac and North Ayrshire Council.

Permanent relocation to the rival Troon ferry terminal was proposed by its owner Associated British Ports (ABP) in September 2016, with an offer to contribute £8 million to the cost of a new terminal building and upgrades to their dock left vacant by the closure a year earlier of the P&O Larne-Troon service. Minister for Transport and the Islands Humza Yousaf reaffirmed the priority of Ardrossan. Local MSP Kenneth Gibson, who`opposed the move, said Peel Ports had "so far not been the most accommodating in terms of negotiating a multi-million pound investment from the SNP Government". North Ayrshire Council prepared proposals in talks with Peel Ports, whose project director for regeneration of the Harbour said "We are committed to a multi- million pound investment in the marine infrastructure at Ardrossan to improve connections with Arran via the shortest, fastest and cheapest route.These will be bespoke facilities and modern infrastructure specifically designed for the new £48.5m ferry, which will itself dramatically improve docking reliability in poor weather." The council was to use regeneration funds for improvements to the passenger terminal and access, roads and car park. Following consultations, the Scottish Government decided in April 2017 to keep Ardrossan as the mainland port for the Arran ferry service.

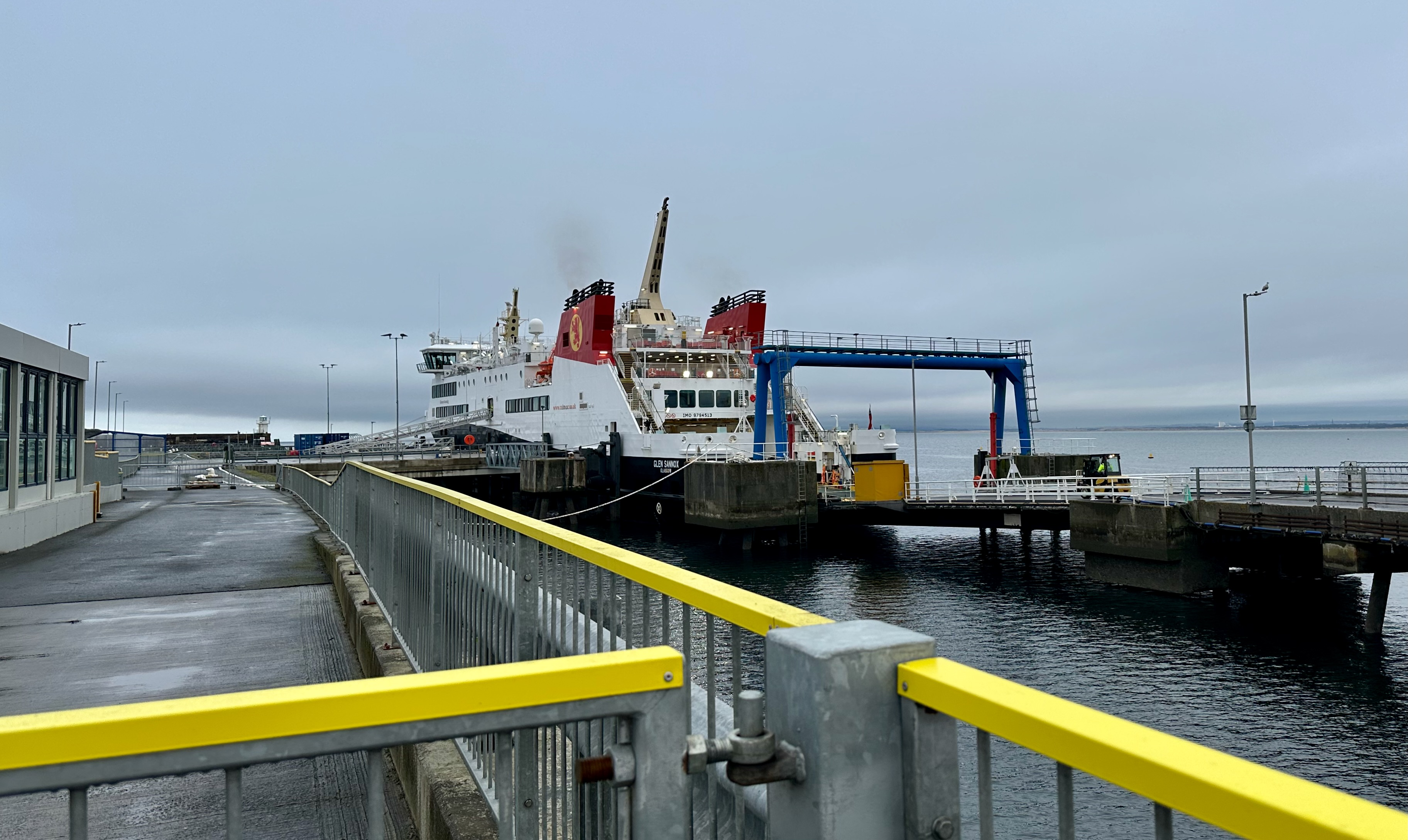
Port of Troon ferry terminal building, with Glen Sannox at linkspan

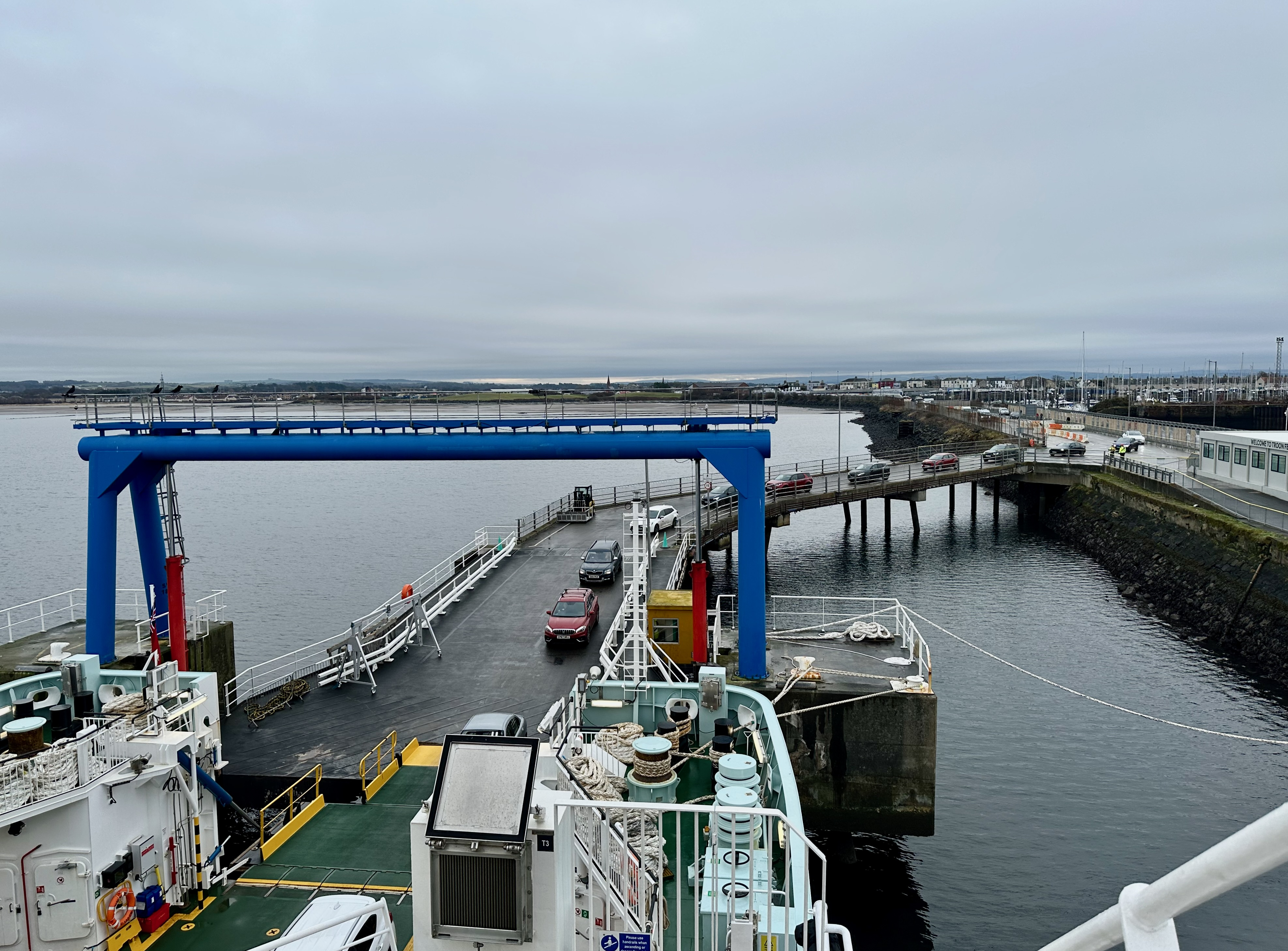
Glen Sannox loading cars at Port of Troon linkspan

The Ardrossan harbour development plan was supported by the taskforce, and in April 2018 Humza Yousaf gave the project the go-ahead. In April 2020 CMAL awarded a contract for design and installation of LNG bunkering facilities at Ardrossan and Uig. The plan was for Ardrossan harbour's Irish Berth to be the primary dock during two years of construction, with Troon as a temporary back-up. In 2021, Troon was chosen as the primary dock during the works, and preparations there began in May. During tender design work, the scope of works at Ardrossan expanded, including re-alignment of the Arran berth. On 14 August 2023 the Minister for Transport, Fiona Hyslop, announced a pause to obtain a refreshed business case and cost exercise by Transport Scotland. Peel took the view that increased costs should primarily be borne by the Scottish Government and North Ayrshire Council.

To keep services running while waiting for Glen Sannox, in May 2023 CalMac chartered MV Alfred which could only use the Irish berth. After safety checks, Peel closed the berth on 18 January 2024, and arrangements had to be made to run Alfred on a freight-only service from Troon. Transport Secretary Mairi McAllan said the business case review for essential repair works to Ardrossan harbour was still incomplete. On 3 February Peel announced that the closure was permanent. Responding to a petition calling for the Scottish Parliament to nationalise the Peel Ports Clydeport ports and harbours, CalMac's interim chief executive alleged that Peel's lack of investment in maintenance left the berths substandard and, unless resolved, ferries would have to run permanently from Troon, despite this reducing frequency of service. Peel said CalMac ships had caused the damage through inappropriate overuse. In January 2025, with Glen Sannox about to enter service, there was still no agreement between Peel Ports, Transport Scotland and North Ayrshire Council on funding the necessary works, the business case review for the Ardrossan harbour development project was still awaited, and the pause continued.

LNG is currently shipped from Qatar, Angola, Peru and the US to the Grain LNG Terminal in Kent, then taken by road tankers to five off-grid networks in Scotland, including Stornoway, Oban and Campbeltown. In this way, LNG is to be brought to Troon and Ardrossan for the ferries. On 24 May 2023, CalMac awarded Molgas Energy UK Ltd the contract to supply and deliver the LNG to the new ferries.

== Service ==
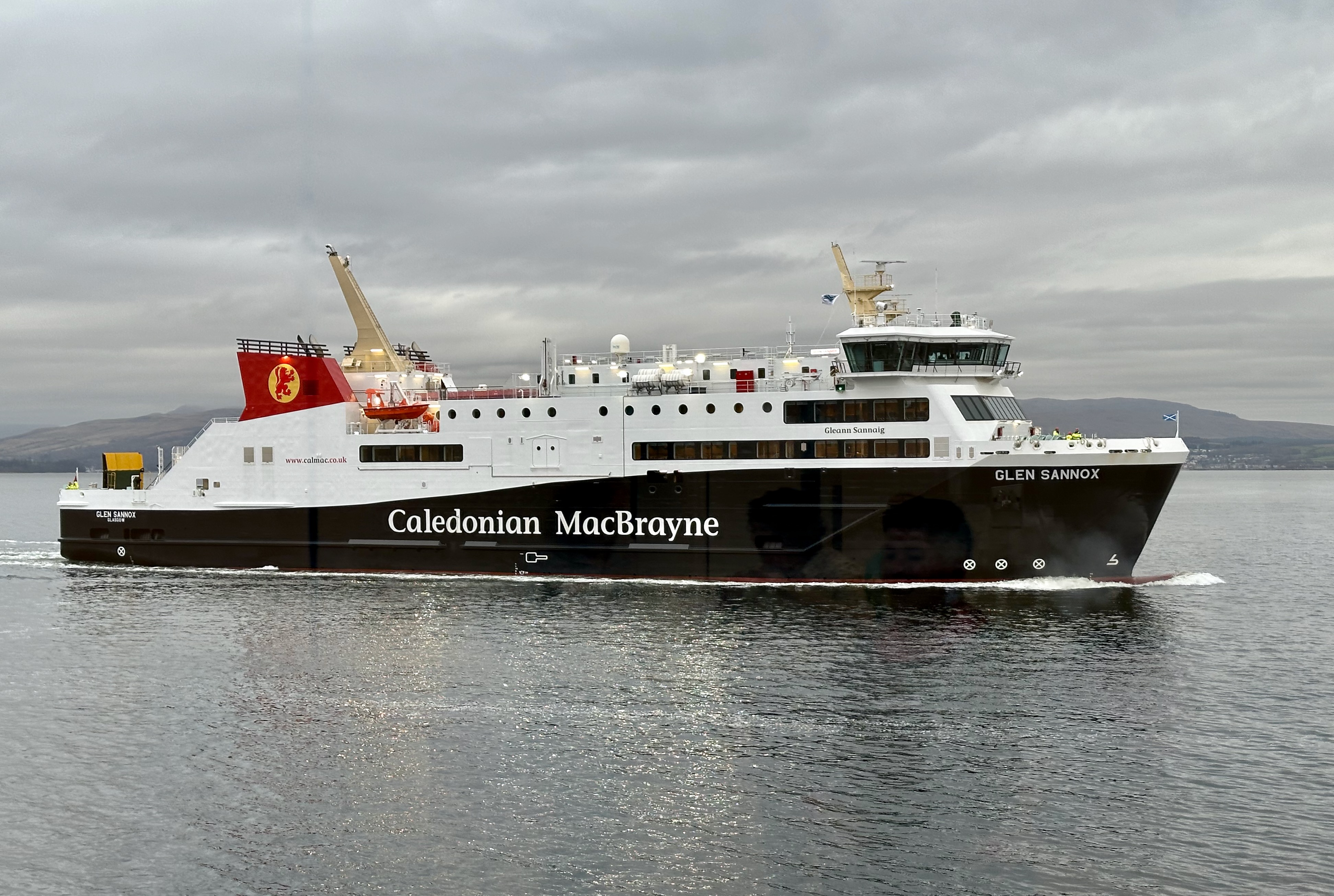
Glen Sannox on crew familiarisation trials before entering service

Glen Sannox was constructed for the Ardrossan to Brodick and Ardrossan to Campbeltown crossings. She was originally intended to serve as a running mate to MV Caledonian Isles, taking over from MV Isle of Arran which was due to retire. The journey time of 55 minutes allowed a total of ten return sailings each day. In August 2020, Transport Scotland reconsidered arrangements for the Ardrossan harbour upgrade works, and asked Associated British Ports for access to the port in Troon so that the Arran service could be maintained for two years during the works. The journey time from Troon is 75 minutes, reducing the service to six return sailings each day. Transport Scotland subsequently paused inviting tenders for the planned upgrade works at Ardrossan to develop a new business case. In May 2023, it was announced that Glen Sannox's sister vessel, MV Glen Rosa, would also serve the Arran route. After CMAL purchased the Ardrossan port from Peel Ports in March 2026, it is expected that upgrades to the port to enable Glen Sannox and Glen Rosa to dock there will be not be completed until at least 2029.

On 4 January 2025, Glen Sannox carried out berthing trials at Stornoway, Lochmaddy and Tarbert, then Ullapool the following morning after berthing overnight there. During these trials a problem with her sewage system was discovered, remedial work to this and to a valve affecting a mezzanine deck were completed before she could start carrying passengers. On 12 January 2025, she took over the 12:45 service from Troon to Brodick for her maiden voyage, along with the subsequent return voyage in place of MV Alfred, carrying paying passengers and cars for the first time.

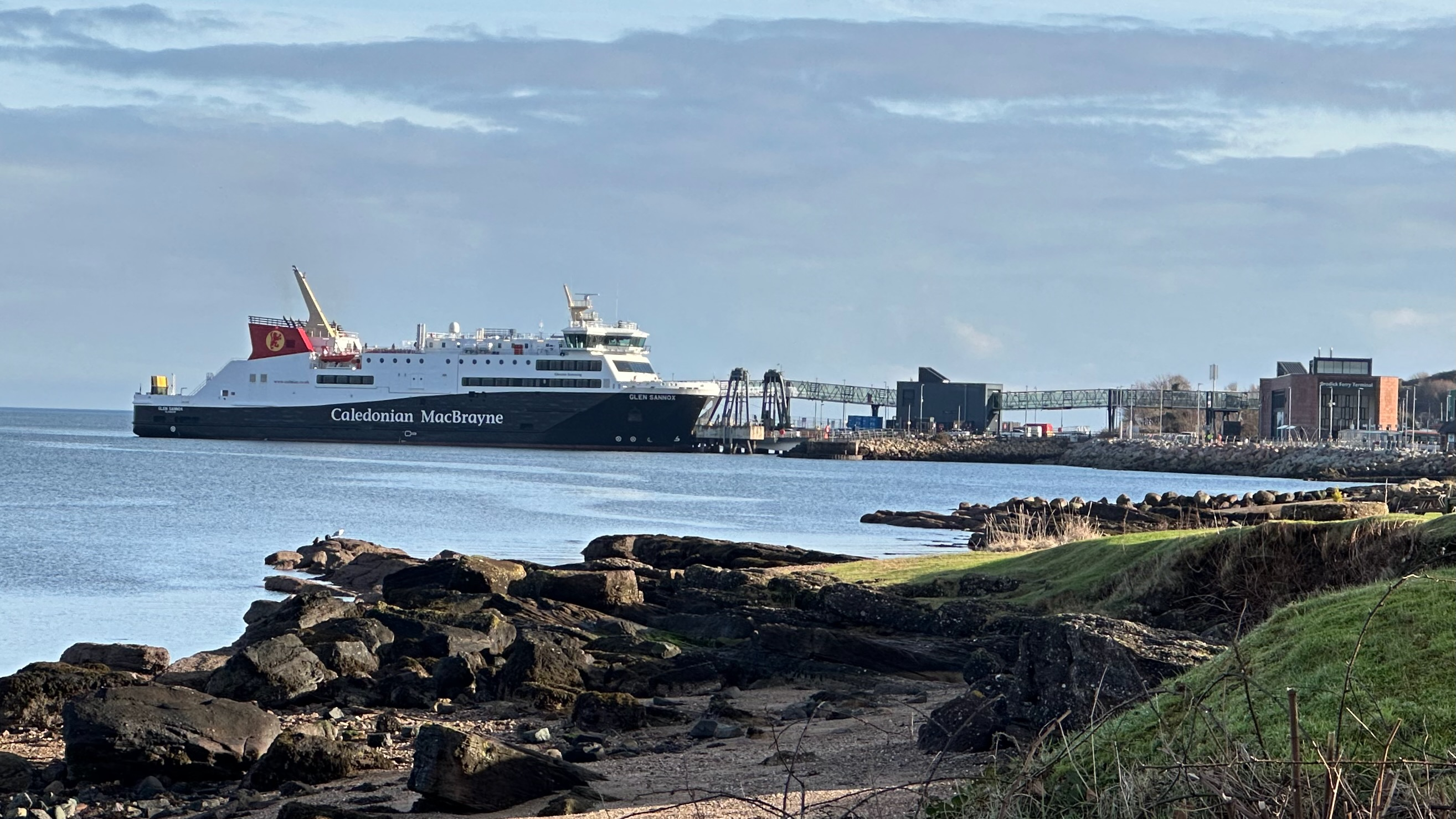
Glen Sannox loading at Brodick ferry terminal on 20 January 2025

Despite gusting strong winds, Glen Sannox entered full passenger service between Troon and Brodick on 13 January 2025. Cancellations that day included the sailings of MV Alfred, the initial partner on the Troon - Brodick route. CalMac stated that there would have been no sailings between Arran and the mainland that day without the new vessel. MV Isle of Arran was redeployed to Oban, initially to restore two-vessel service to Mull which had been disrupted by extended repair work to MV Caledonian Isles. As both Glen Sannox and Alfred are unable to use the shorter route to Ardrossan until the harbour there is improved, sailings from Ardrossan were suspended initially until 28 March 2025, the date being revised initially to the end of April 2025, later further extended after it was announced that Caledonian Isles required further remedial work to her propeller shaft tubes. From then, Glen Sannox is expected to operate between Troon and Brodick up to three times per day, with Caledonian Isles repaired and operating her regular summer timetable between Ardrossan and Brodick.

On 14 March 2025, Glen Sannox was placed out of service due to the discovery of a crack in the hull on a weld seam. After a dive inspection and a minor repair to the hairline crack during the following day, further testing was arranged prior to her returning to service on the afternoon of 16 March. UK Defence Journal said that similar minor repairs and adjustments were not unusual during the early months of service.

In October 2025, Glen Sannox was again removed from service owing to the weld crack in the hull needing remedial work. After repairs were completed, she undertook berthing trials at Kennacraig, in addition to Port Askaig and Port Ellen on Islay before returning to service between Troon and Brodick on 14 October. A 'vibration issue' led to the vessel once again being withdrawn from service on 5 November 2025 to undergo further repairs on Merseyside. Glen Sannox was expected to return to service before Christmas, however further required work including steel strengthening relating to the vibration issues, and remedying a fault with the vessels anchor mechanism, pushed her return date back to 2 March 2026. Repair work to fix the vibration issue on MV Glen Sannox and her sister vessel, MV Glen Rosa, including a redesigned propellers, was expected to cost £3.2M according to Ferguson Marine.

Despite returning to service on 6 March 2026, Glen Sannox was again removed from service on 16 March 2026 due to a port engine oil mist detector alarm. The vessel returned to service for 20 March 2026, but failed again before the end of the day with a port engine issue. On 26 March 2026, Glen Sannox suffered another port engine issue, cancelling three sailings that day, and not returning to service until 2 April 2026 after repairs to her exhaust system. With recurring technical issues with a port engine fuel pump, Glen Sannox was taken out of service on 6 April 2026, returning to the Troon - Brodick route on 8 April.

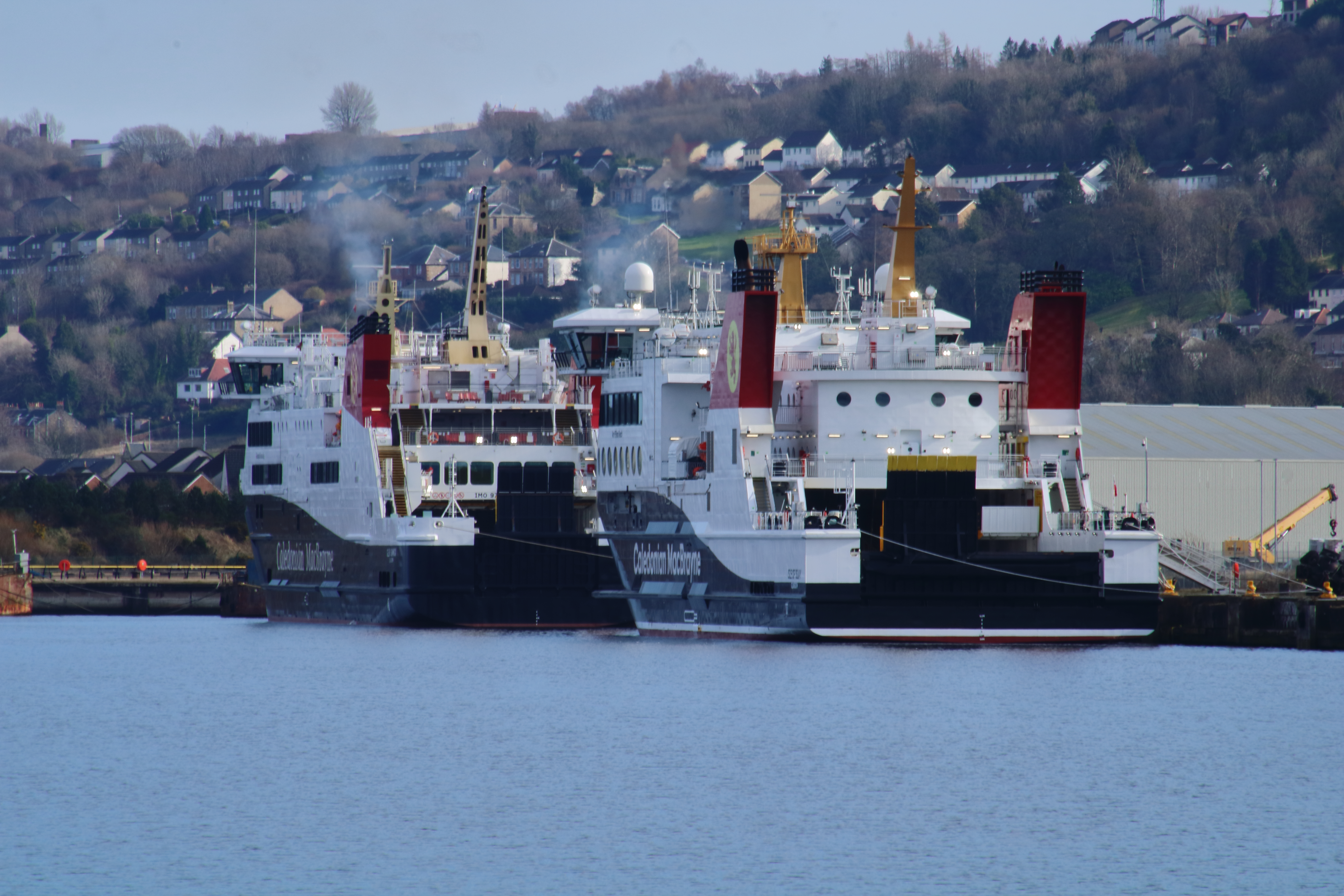
Glen Sannox in for repairs in Inchgreen, docked in front of MV Isle of Islay

Due to a technical issue with the bow ramp on MV Loch Seaforth, Glen Sannox was redeployed to cover her at Stornoway, she departed Troon on 14 April 2026. The issue was partly resolved, allowing Loch Seaforth to return to service whilst Glen Sannox was enroute, however with stern loading only, therefore with a lesser capacity. To deal with backlogs caused by the period of cancellation, Glen Sannox operated a single return sailing each day 15 - 18 April, departing Stornoway at 0900 and Ullapool at 1400 taking 3 hours. Once this cover was finished, Glen Sannox was deployed to the Barra to Oban route, covering for the delayed return to service of MV Isle of Lewis, and releasing MV Isle of Islay to return to the Islay routes from 21 April 2026.

In June 2026, after conducting further berthing trials on the Uig Triangle, Glen Sannox took up new duties as a relief vessel based at Stornoway, with MV Alfred taking up her duties on the Troon - Brodick route for the summer.

On 25 September 2026, CalMac published a revised Vessel Deployment, Disposal and Cascade Plan, indicating that when MV Glen Rosa enters service at Arran, Glen Sannox is to become the dedicated ferry on the Oban to Castlebay route during the summer, with MV Hebrides operating the route in winter.
