= International Code of Safety for Ships Using Gases or Other Low-flashpoint Fuels =

The International Code of Safety for Ships Using Gases or Other Low-flashpoint Fuels, often referred and abbreviated as the IGF Code, is the International Maritime Organization (IMO) standard for the use of gases as a fuel in maritime transport.

The Code was adopted in June 2015. It entered into force on 1 January 2017.

== Content and application ==
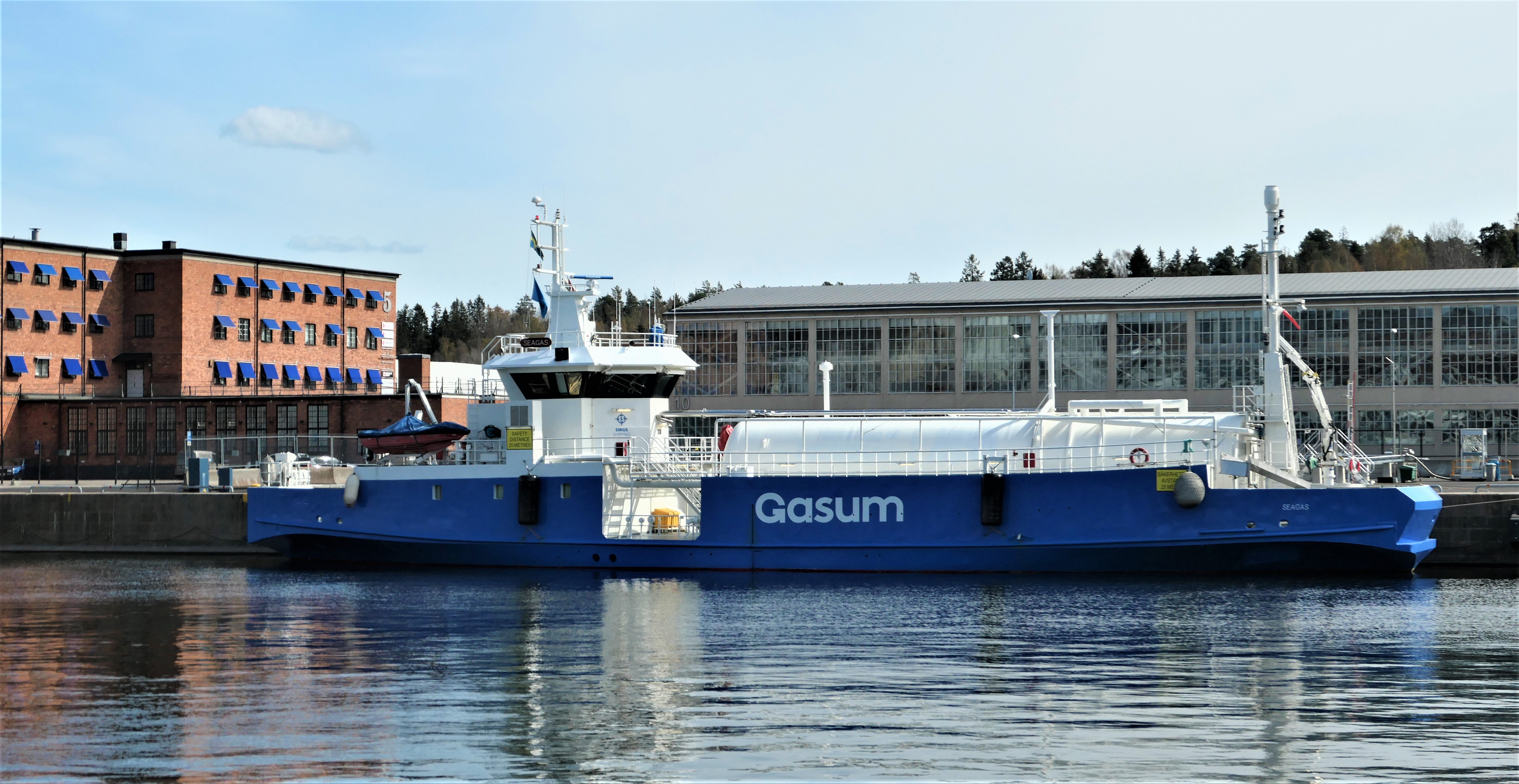
LNG for use as a fuel, as seen on this LNG bunkering vessel is regulated by the Code.

The IGF Code provides industry standards for ships that use fuels with a flashpoint of less than 60°C. The IGF Code seeks to regulate the safety changes from the carriage and use of gas fuel, in particular liquefied natural gas and other low-flashpoint fuels. These fuels are used in engines such as a Marine LNG Engine. The IGF Code sets out mandatory provisions for the arrangement, installation, control and monitoring of machinery, equipment and systems that use low-flashpoint fuels. It is organised according to a goal based approach.

The Code is enforced through the SOLAS Convention which was amended to require new ships using gases or other low-flashpoint fuels to comply with the IGF Code.

The Code introduced new training requirements for seafarers working onboard these ships. These included the development of new model training courses for IGF training.

IMO member States require ships to apply the IGF Code when applying under their flag. For example, Canada has requirements for vessels to comply with the mandatory provisions of the Code.

== Recent Amendments ==
The Code has been amended several times to incorporate changes in technology and safety practices based on experience since the Code entered into force in 2017. Recent amendments to the Code include:

- In June 2017, fire safety regulations and bridge window design changes were adopted by the IMO. They entered info force on the 1st January 2020.
- In June 2019, the Code was amended to include changes for ship design and arrangements, including the fuel containment system, as well as other changes concerning power arrangements and fire safety regulations. These amendments will enter into force on 1st January 2024.
- In November 2020, the Code was amended to include amendments regarding tank cofferdams, fire-extinguishing systems and tensile tests for materials under the Code. These amendments will enter into force on 1st January 2024.
- In April 2022, the IMO adopted amendments changes relating to materials for cryogenic service. They are due to enter into force on 1st January 2026.
