= Moventas =

Finnish manufacturing company

- Industry: Renewable energy
- Founded: 2005; 21 years ago
- Fate: Acquired
- Successor: Flender GmbH (Winergy)
- Headquarters: Jyväskylä, Finland
- Website: www.moventas.com

Moventas was a Finnish company that manufactured mechanical power transmission equipment and provided after sales service for the renewable energy industry. In May 2022, Flender completed its acquisition of Moventas, after which Moventas Gears Oy was renamed Flender Finland Oy and began operating under the Winergy brand.

Moventas gearboxes have been used in wind turbines since the 1980s, and its installed base is some 13,000 units globally. Moventas also worked closely with marine tidal turbine OEMs. Moventas provided after sales service to its own as well as third party gearboxes of almost any brand.

Moventas had wind gearbox manufacturing in Finland and assembly facilities in the UK (DB Wind UK) and North America, as well as service centres around the world. Moventas was headquartered in Jyväskylä, Central Finland.

== History ==
Moventas's roots lie in Finnish gear manufacturing through Valmet Power Transmission and Santasalo. Gear production connected to Valmet's Rautpohja works began in 1938, while the Santasalo family business was founded in 1941; these and other related operations were later consolidated under Metso in 1999. Moventas's wind gearbox business also traces its history to the 1980s, when its predecessor operations began supplying drivetrains to the wind industry.

The company adopted the Moventas name in 2005 after Metso sold Metso Drives to CapMan. In 2007, Industri Kapital became the primary owner of Moventas.

During the late 2000s, Moventas expanded its manufacturing capacity in Jyväskylä. In 2008, the Nordic Investment Bank supported the investment in a new wind turbine gear manufacturing facility in Jyväskylä that was expected to double the company's production capacity for wind turbine and industrial gears. The company also expanded internationally during this period, including North American assembly operations.

In 2011, Moventas was acquired by Clyde Blowers. In 2013, the company announced a rebranding intended to differentiate its industrial and wind gear businesses: the industrial gear business resumed use of the Santasalo brand, while Moventas remained the brand for the wind business, and after-sales services were grouped under the Santasalo Moventas identity.

In 2022, Flender GmbH completed its acquisition of Moventas, after which the business began to be integrated into Flender's wind operations under the Winergy brand.
