= Council of Economic Advisers (Scotland) =

Scottish government body

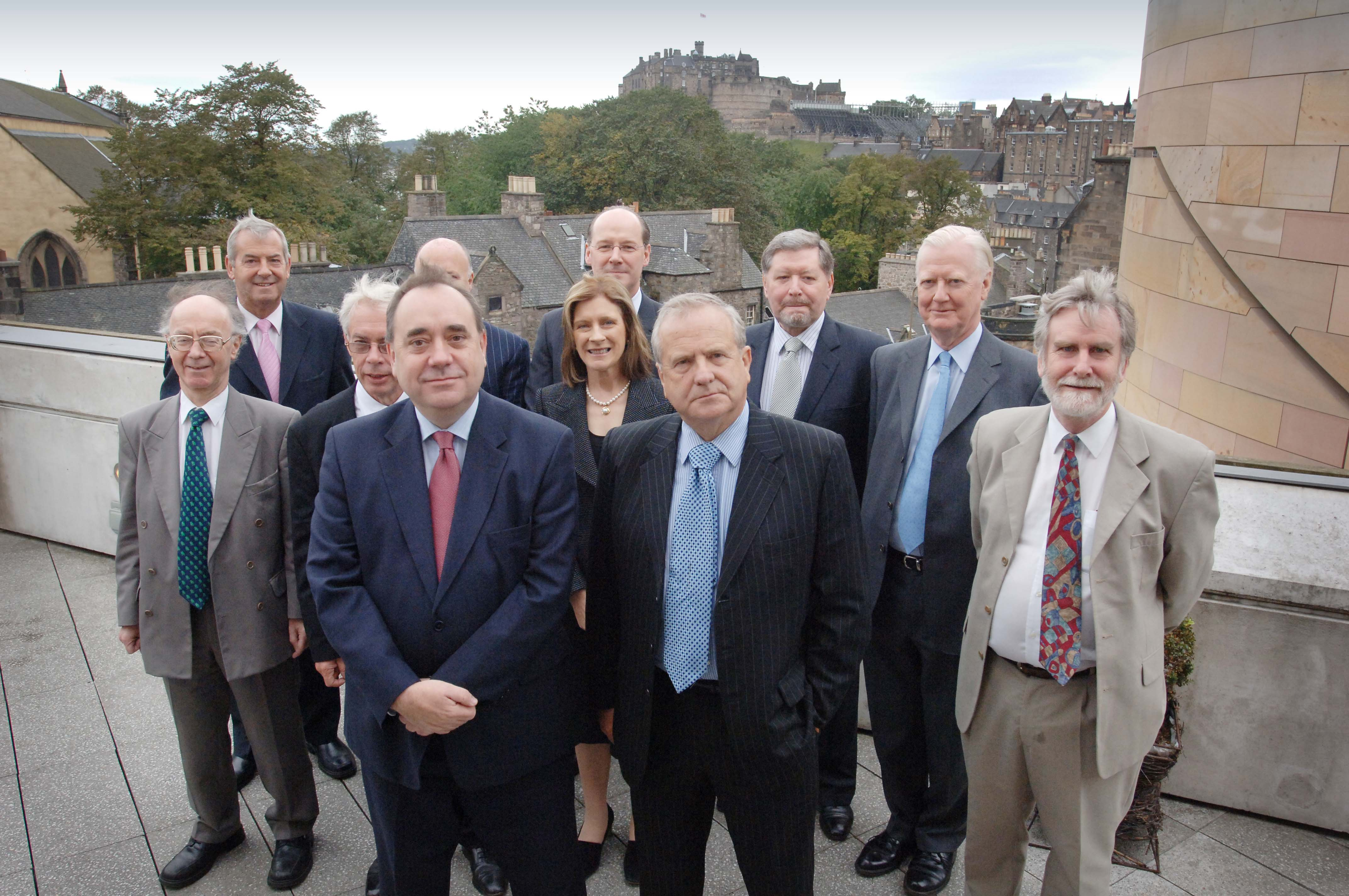
The Council at their first meeting

The Council of Economic Advisers (CEA) in Scotland was a group of economists and leading figures from the private sector and academia who advised the Scottish Government. Its principal aims were to advise on improving the competitiveness of the Scottish economy and how to tackle inequality within Scotland. It was established in 2007, meeting for the first time on 21 September. The Council had two formal meetings a year and also carried out engagement and work between meetings. Minutes of its meetings and other reports are available on its website.

The council was replaced in 2021 with the Advisory Council for Economic Transformation, which is no longer active.

== Membership ==
Membership (as of January 2020)

- Crawford Beveridge CBE (Chair) – Chairman of Scottish Equity Partners Ltd. and Non-Executive Chairman of Autodesk; previously Chief Executive of Scottish Enterprise.
- Sir Harry Burns – Professor of Global Public Health at the University of Strathclyde and former Chief Medical Officer for Scotland.
- Professor Sara Carter OBE – Professor of Entrepreneurship and Associate Deputy Principal of the University of Strathclyde.
- Craig Clark, CEO and founder of Clyde Space
- Professor Mariana Mazzucato – Professor in the Economics of Innovation and Public Value, University College London (UCL)
- Jim McColl OBE – Chairman and Chief Executive of Clyde Blowers plc.
- Professor Sir Anton Muscatelli – Principal and Vice-Chancellor of the University of Glasgow
- Professor Joseph Stiglitz – University Professor, Columbia University and winner of the 2001 Nobel Memorial Prize in Economic Sciences.
- Julia Unwin, Chair of the Independent Inquiry on the Future of Civil Society
