= Jim McColl =

Scottish businessman (born 1951)

Jim McColl OBE
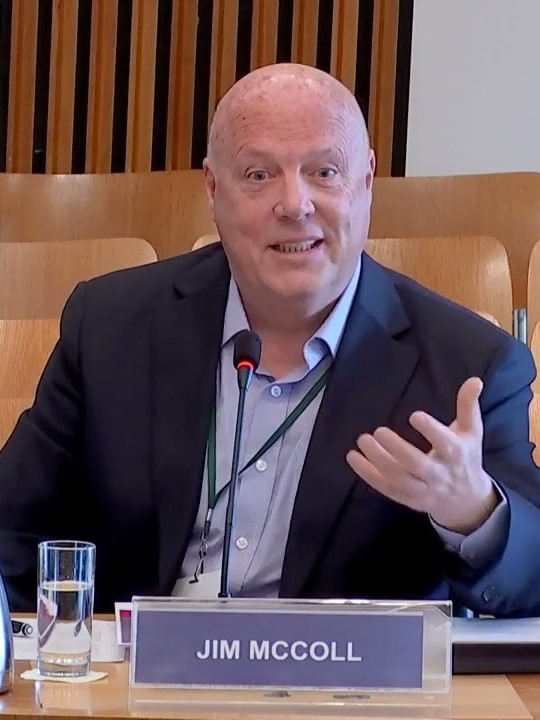
- McColl appears before the Scottish Parliament's Public Audit Committee, 2022
- Born: James Allan McColl; 22 December 1951 (age 74); Carmunnock, Scotland
- Education: Rutherglen Academy; Strathclyde University
- Occupation: Businessman
- Known for: Clyde Blowers
- Spouse: Shona

James Allan McColl OBE (born 22 December 1951) is a Scottish businessman who is the chairman and chief executive officer of Clyde Blowers. He was a member of the Council of Economic Advisors.

In 2007, he was placed tenth on the Sunday Times Rich List in Scotland. The Daily Record reported in November 2008 that McColl had overtaken Tom Hunter as "Scotland's richest man" with an estimated fortune of £800million. In 2021, The Sunday Times Rich List estimated his fortune at £1 billion.

== Biography ==
The son of a butcher, McColl was born and raised in Carmunnock, a small village outside East Kilbride, and educated at Rutherglen Academy. He left school at 16 to take up an engineering apprenticeship with Weir Pumps of Cathcart, Glasgow. After gaining City & Guilds certificates at lower and higher level, he gained a BSc Degree in Technology and Business Studies at Strathclyde University. He returned to Weir Pumps in 1978, studying during the next three years for an MBA.

McColl joined Diamond Power Speciality Ltd in 1981, an engineering company supplying equipment to the power industry worldwide; during his tenure he studied part-time for a master's degree in International Accounting and Finance. Head-hunted by Coopers & Lybrand, in 1985 he became a consultant, working with companies in financial difficulties that needed guidance. The following year he left Coopers to become a self-employed "company doctor", during which he made money through two successful turnarounds.

=== Clyde Blowers ===
In 1992, McColl paid £1million to buy 29.9% of family-owned engineering company Clyde Blowers plc; the company was then losing money on a turnover of £4million, but had a full listing on the London Stock Exchange. After he took the company private and increased his holding to 70% in 2001, over the following five years Clyde Blowers bought six of its eight major competitors, and now has a 55% global market share of its original core business in blower manufacture. In May 2007, Clyde Blowers bought Weir Pumps from Weir Group plc, the company at which McColl had started his career. In September 2008, McColl led a team which enabled Clyde Blowers to acquire the entire Fluid & Power Division of Fortune 500 multi-industry company Textron, in a deal worth over $1 billion. Clyde Blowers presently consists of 85 companies in 27 different countries, employing 5,000 people around the world, with an annual turnover in excess of £1.35 billion. In 2018, it was announced that Clyde Blowers exited their portfolio company, Cone Drive, The Timken Company for a reported multi-million dollar deal.

=== Ferguson Marine ===
McColl was involved in the takeover of Ferguson Marine Engineering Limited after the business went into liquidation in August 2014. His intervention prevented the last remaining shipyard on the Lower Clyde from closure. Later in 2015 his yard was controversially awarded a ferry contract to build two new ferries for Caledonian MacBrayne. Issues such as disputes over the design led to the ferries being over budget and incomplete when the yard was nationalised in 2019. The Ferry Fiasco is an ongoing political scandal in Scotland, exposing management failures across all parties involved.

=== Recognition ===
McColl was appointed Officer of the Order of the British Empire (OBE) in the 2001 Birthday Honours for services to the engineering industry. McColl won an "Alumnus of the Year" award from Strathclyde University in 1998, was awarded an honorary doctorate by Napier University in 2003, and an honorary doctorate by Glasgow University in 2007. McColl won the Entrepreneurial Exchange 'Entrepreneur of the Year Award' for 1999/2000, and the Ernst & Young "Master Entrepreneur of the Year Award" for 2001. In July 2005, McColl was awarded The Prince Philip Medal 2005 'Certificate of Achievement' for an outstanding contribution to the engineering industry. In May 2006, McColl was presented with a Scottish International Business Achievement award from The Princess Royal.

=== Personal life ===
McColl and his wife Shona are now resident in Monaco. They also have a home outside Glasgow, and McColl is a keen car enthusiast for both modern and classic cars.

McColl was a supporter of the Scottish Government's policy of independence for Scotland, but in early 2015 changed his view, stating that "the decision's been made" following the 2014 referendum; however, he supports the idea of further tax devolution. He was a member of the Scottish Government's Scottish Council of Economic Advisers, and spends much of his spare time working on a Glasgow-based welfare-to-work programme.

The 2017 edition of the Sunday Times Rich List estimated his fortune at £1.07 billion.

== 2010 rumoured Rangers takeover bid ==
On 28 March 2010, it was reported in the Sunday Herald that, after discussions with the Rangers Supporters Trust about a takeover designed to make the football club a supporter-owned entity, McColl was believed to be backing the Trust's bid for Rangers. McColl later told BBC Scotland that he had no interest in any personal financial involvement, but was providing finance advice to the Rangers Supporters' Trust. McColl was part of a consortium, led by former Rangers manager Walter Smith, that attempted to buy Rangers from liquidators BDO for £6million.
