= Clyde Blowers Capital =

Scottish investment company

- Industry: Industrial investment
- Headquarters: East Kilbride, Scotland
- Key people: Jim McColl
- Products: Shipbuilding, hydraulics, pumps, electrical machines
- Website: https://www.clydeblowerscapital.com/

Clyde Blowers Capital is a Scottish industrial investment company which owns several engineering companies. Its products include shipbuilding, hydraulics, pumps and electrical machines. It is led by Jim McColl.

== Subsidiary companies ==
- Allrig
- Cone Drive
- David Brown Santasalo
- Hydreco Hydraulics
- KETO pumps
- Moventas
- Parsons Peebles
