= Marine LNG Engine =

Dual fuel engine

A marine LNG engine is a dual fuel engine that uses natural gas and bunker fuel to convert chemical energy in to mechanical energy. Due to natural gas' cleaner burning properties, the use of natural gas in merchant ship propulsion plants is becoming an option for companies in order to comply with IMO and MARPOL environmental regulations. The natural gas is stored in liquid state (LNG) and the boil-off gas is routed to and burned in dual fuel engines. Shipping companies have been cautious when choosing a propulsion system for their fleets. The steam turbine system has been the main choice as the prime mover on LNG carriers over the last several decades. The decades-old system on steam propelled LNG carriers uses BOG (boil-off gas). LNG carriers are heavily insulated to keep the LNG at around -160 °C – to keep it liquefied. Despite insulation, the LNG containment area is penetrated by heat which allows for naturally generated boil-off gas (BOG).

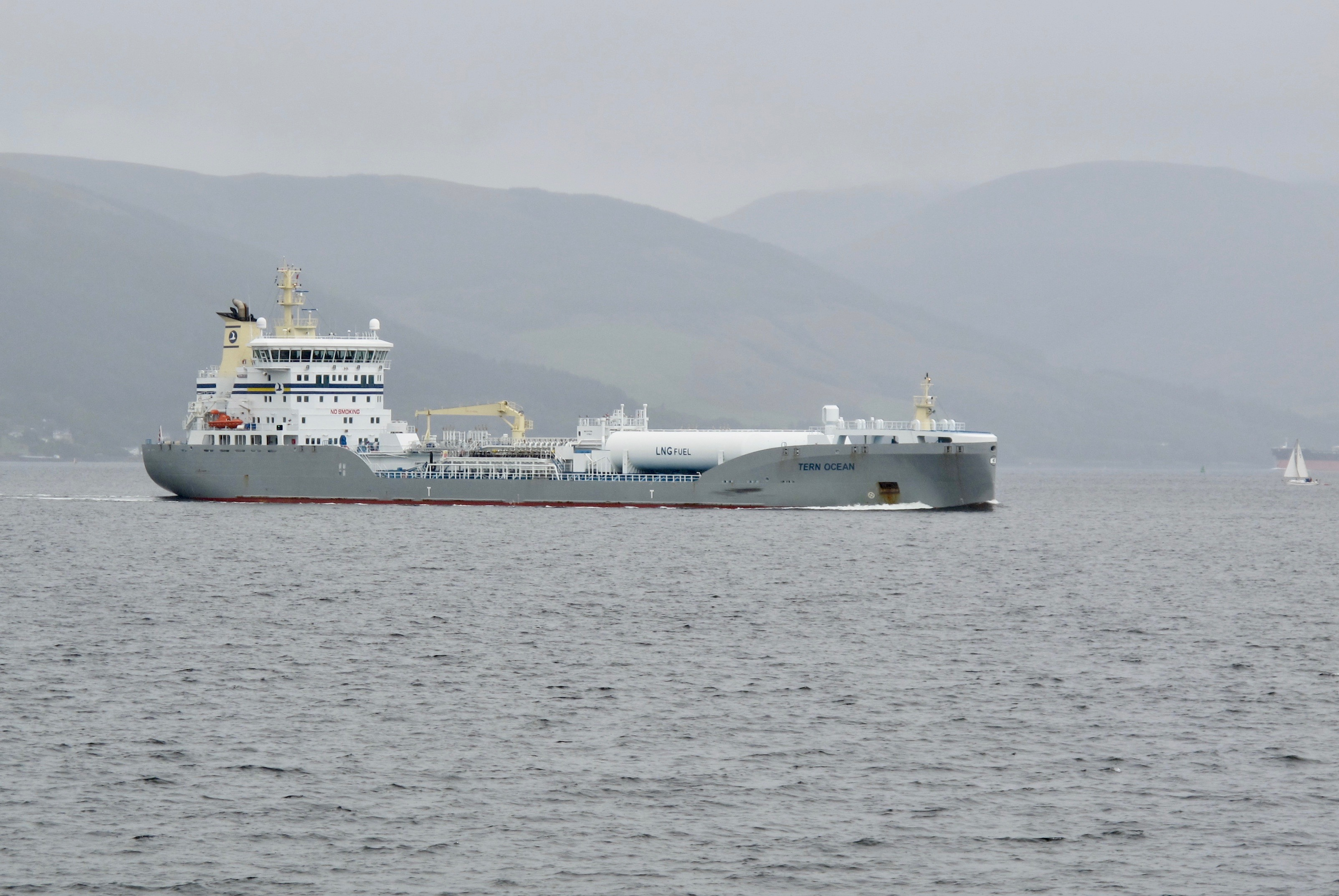
LNG engined oil / chemical tanker Tern Ocean on the Firth of Clyde

== History ==
LNG shipping first became a possibility in 1959 when the Methane Pioneer, a converted WWII freighter safely transported Liquefied Natural Gas into the United Kingdom. After proving that LNG can be safely transported across the ocean, the LNG shipping industry boomed and now employs 200 billion dollars annually in capital. Since the start of the LNG industry in 1964, international trade has increased 50 times over, production capacity has increased 10 times over, and individual ship capacity has increased 5 times over. The LNG tanker design was initially created by Worm's and Co. This design is now referred to as the Gaz Transport Design. The tanks were initially created to hold 34,000 cubic meters, but the design has transformed into 71,500 cubic meters. Spherical LNG tanks showed up in 1973, when Hoegh built the Norman Lady. Spherical tanks are common among modern LNG vessels. In 1999, Samsung Heavy Ind. created the largest New Membrane-type LNG carrier of its time. She was the largest single hull vessel of her time, with a length of 278.8 meters, and the capability of 20.7 knots. The Arctic Princess, delivered in 2006, was the largest LNG tanker ever created. She is 288 meters long, and has a capacity of 147,000 cubic meters. Since 2006 capacities have continued to climb. New build LNG vessels delivered to customers in 2018 are often designed to fit through the expanded Panama Canal (neopanamax) and have 170,000 cubic meter capacities.

== Boil-off gas ==
The natural gas that fuels dual fuel engines is carried on ships as a boiling liquid and transported at slightly higher than atmospheric pressure. When tank insulation is penetrated by an influx of heat, it causes the temperature of the liquefied natural gas to rise which allows for vaporization from liquid to gas. When heat penetrates the tank, the tank's pressure increases due to the boil-off. The insulation of the tanks is designed with the most advanced technology. Even still, the insulation of the tanks is penetrated by heat. The boil-off occurs during the ships voyage. During a storm, the LNG cargo moves and sloshes around in the tanks. The boil-off gas represents 0.1% - 0.25% of the ships capacity per day. Tanks need to be maintained at a steady pressure. If the pressure in tanks gets too high, relief and safety valves open, venting the boil-off into the atmosphere until the excess pressure is relieved. Due to the fact that on-board LNG re-liquefaction is uneconomical for most ships, the gas produced by the boil-off gets routed to the ship's propulsion system and used as fuel for power plants such as steam boilers and dual fuel marine diesel engines. This reduces the use of bunker fuel, therefore reducing fuel and equipment maintenance costs.

== Technology ==
Samsung's Supreme was a Mark-III type LNG container ship that was the largest of its kind. The Supreme had the newest technology seen in LNG ships. She features tanks completely surrounded by double bottom hull, and a cofferdam between tanks. Each tank stores its cargo at -163 degrees Celsius. This is a standard storage temperature for LNG This is accomplished by 250 mm of insulation, and a 1.2 mm thick stainless steel membrane. Each cargo tank has submerged centrifugal pumps to unload cargo rapidly. This is the standard unloading method for LNG tanks. The maximum drought for LNG ships is typically 12 meters. This is due to harbor facilities sizes and restrictions. The most common size of LNG vessels ranges between 120,000 and 180,000 cubic meters because of ship dimensions. (Propulsion Trends in LNG Carriers Two-stroke Engines, 2017).

The two common types of LNG carriers are Moss and Membrane. Moss type carriers feature spherical tanks to hold LNG, while Membrane style carriers feature more traditional rectangular style tanks with a stainless-steel membrane. Membrane tankers are more common because they are smaller than moss ships for the same amount of LNG fuel carried, but they create more boil-off gas than Moss style ships.

A study by MEC Intelligence found said that LNG will be the primary fuel source for all merchant ships within 40 years. Many companies have already begun looking at the process of switching their fleets over to LNG propulsion systems.

LNG vessel propulsion systems typically come equipped with WHRs, because they can lead to reduced emissions, reduced fuel consumption, and better efficiency. Switching to LNG powered vessels is a complicated task for companies, but combined with modern Waste Heat Reduction systems (WHRs), LNG vessels can be more efficient than diesel or steam propelled vessels.

== Propulsion systems ==
Most propulsion systems in LNG carriers use the BOG and liquid fuels. In a steam plant, the BOG is used to fire the boilers and produce steam. The steam drives the turbines and propels the ship. The advantage to this type is that when the LNG cargo tank pressure is elevated the excessive BOG is burned simultaneously with liquid fuel. If there isn't enough BOG, liquid fuel (heavy fuel oil or HFO) is used to keep the plant operating. An alternative to the steam turbine engine is the dual-fuel marine diesel engine. Commercial ship propulsion system manufacturers such as Finland's Wärtsilä and Germany's MAN Diesel are producing large bore dual-fuel diesel engines. The MAN B&W ME-GI Engines have extremely flexible fuel modes that range from 95% natural gas to 100% HFO and anywhere in between. A minimum of 5% HFO for pilot oil is required as these are compression ignition engines and natural gas is not self-combustible. Steam turbines are exclusively the primary moving source for LNG ships, even though 2-stroke diesel engines are more efficient. This is because the boil-off gas from LNG needs to be utilized.

== Cost benefits ==
Recent research has been focused on using LNG for fuel on ships other than LNG tankers. These studies show that LNG stands out in terms of emissions reduction and reduced operational costs. Some economic incentives have been shown to be advantageous to running an LNG propulsion system. When certain systems such as waste heat recovery (using waste heat to do work rather than dissipate) are added to the power plant, significant savings can be observed. One study shows that an LNG engine with a WHR system saves money compared to a diesel engine with WHR. There is a higher initial investment cost but it is a cost efficient method and environmentally sound one.

== Environmental and safety issues ==
Natural gas consists mainly of methane, which has a much stronger greenhouse effect than CO_{2} ref: Global warming potential. Climate impacts of methane are due largely to methane leakage. For example, there is an issue called methane slip. Methane slip is when gas leaks unburned through the engine. Methane has a GWP(20) (20-year global warming potential) which is 86x higher than CO_{2}. If methane slip is not controlled, environmental benefits to using natural gas are reduced and can cancel out the advantages over diesel or bunker fuel due to the high greenhouse effect of the methane. Another challenge is hazards associated with the LNG being stored at very low temperatures. Insulation of the tank is critical, and there's possibilities of structural brittleness and personnel frostbite injuries. Essentially, since it is established that LNG for ship propulsion reduces CO_{2} and other pollutants compared to common heavy fuel oils, LNG implementation depends on these key factors: Gas availability, demand for ships, emission limits (emission controlled areas), LNG tank installation, and safety requirements. Challenges related to the use of LNG should be taken into consideration. Challenges such as the lack of infrastructure in the majority of commercial ports, crew's limited experience running engines with gas fuels, the future price of gas, and the required safety measures all are critical points to be considered.

Use of LNG reduces Sulfur Oxides by nearly 100 percent, and it reduces Nitrogen Oxide emission by about 85 percent. There is considerable debate as to whether use of LNG results in reduced greenhouse gas emissions, with studies finding that methane leakage negates climate benefits.

The requirements concerning the use of LNG fuel in shipping, in particular technical and safety requirements are set out in International Code of Safety for Ships Using Gases or Other Low-flashpoint Fuels, abbreviated as the IGF Code.
